= Pennsylvania House of Representatives, District 84 =

American legislative district

Pennsylvania's 84th State House of Representatives district
Representative
Joseph Hamm; R–Hepburn Township
- Population (2022): 64,134

The 84th Pennsylvania House of Representatives District is located in Northeastern Pennsylvania and has been represented by Joseph Hamm since 2021.

== District profile ==
The 84th district encompasses all of Sullivan County and includes the following parts of Lycoming County:

- Anthony Township
- Bastress Township
- Brown Township
- Cascade Township
- Cogan House Township
- Cummings Township
- Eldred Township
- Fairfield Township
- Franklin Township
- Gamble Township
- Hepburn Township
- Hughesville
- Jackson Township
- Jersey Shore
- Jordan Township
- Lewis Township
- Limestone Township
- McHenry Township
- McIntyre Township
- McNett Township
- Mifflin Township
- Mill Creek Township
- Montoursville
- Moreland Township
- Muncy
- Muncy Township
- Muncy Creek Township
- Nippenose Township
- Old Lycoming Township
- Penn Township
- Piatt Township
- Picture Rocks
- Pine Township
- Plunketts Creek Township
- Porter Township
- Salladasburg
- Shrewsbury Township
- Upper Fairfield Township
- Watson Township
- Wolf Township
- Woodward Township

== Representatives ==
Representative	Party	Years	District home	Note
Prior to 1969, seats were apportioned by county.
Alvin C. Bush	Republican	1969 – 1970		
John W. Klepper	Democrat	1971 – 1972		
Joseph V. Grieco	Republican	1973 – 1984		
Alvin C. Bush	Republican	1985 – 1994		
Brett O. Feese	Republican	1995 – 2006		
Garth Everett	Republican	2007 – 2020	Muncy	
Joseph Hamm	Republican	2021 – present	Hepburn Twp	Incumbent

== Recent election results ==
PA House election, 2024: Pennsylvania House, District 84
Party	Candidate	Votes	%
Republican	Joseph Hamm (incumbent)	Unopposed	
Total votes		33,611	100.00
Republican hold			

PA House election, 2022: Pennsylvania House, District 84
Party	Candidate	Votes	%
Republican	Joseph Hamm (incumbent)	Unopposed	
Total votes		25,957	100.00
Republican hold			

PA House election, 2020: Pennsylvania House, District 84
Party	Candidate	Votes	%
Republican	Joseph Hamm	25,961	78.82
Democratic	Amanda Waldman	6,975	21.18
Total votes		32,936	100.00
Republican hold			

PA House election, 2018: Pennsylvania House, District 84
Party	Candidate	Votes	%
Republican	Garth Everett (incumbent)	18,192	78.93
Democratic	Linda Kay Sosniak	4,855	21.07
Total votes		23,047	100.00
Republican hold			

PA House election, 2016: Pennsylvania House, District 84
Party	Candidate	Votes	%
Republican	Garth Everett (incumbent)	Unopposed	
Total votes		24,765	100.00
Republican hold			
