= Pennsylvania Route 864 =

State highway in Lycoming County, Pennsylvania, US

Pennsylvania Route 864

Route information
- Maintained by PennDOT
- Length: 13.11 mi (21.10 km)

Major junctions
- West end: PA 87 in Upper Fairfield Township
- East end: US 220 in Picture Rocks

Location
- Country: United States
- State: Pennsylvania
- Counties: Lycoming

Highway system
- Pennsylvania State Route System; Interstate; US; State; Scenic; Legislative
| ← PA 863 | → PA 865 |

Pennsylvania Route 864 (designated by the Pennsylvania Department of Transportation as PA 864) is a 13.11-mile-long (21.10 km) state route located in Lycoming County, Pennsylvania. The western terminus of the route is at PA 87 in Farragut, a hamlet of Upper Fairfield Township. The eastern terminus is at U.S. Route 220 (US 220) in Picture Rocks. The road is also called Laurel Run Road for half a mile from its eastern terminus in Picture Rocks until it leaves the city.

== Route description ==
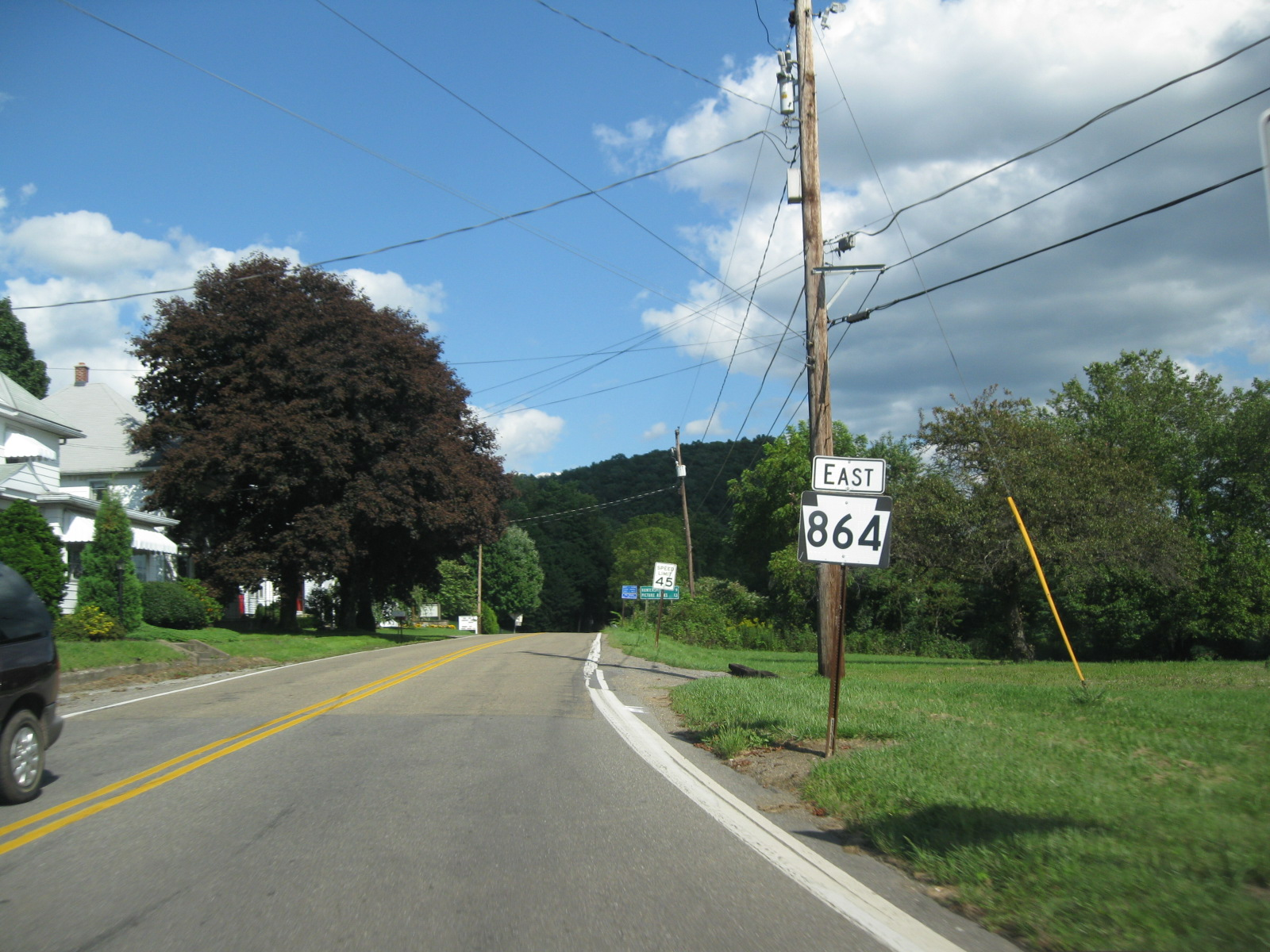
PA 864 proceeding eastbound at the western terminus of PA 87 in Upper Fairfield Township

PA 864 begins at an intersection with PA 87 in the hamlet of Farragut, within Upper Fairfield Township. The route proceeds eastward through Farragut, passing local residences and fields before curving into a mix of woods and fields. PA 864 continues winding for a couple miles, curving back and forth between the northeast and southeast. Another curve is made after the intersection with Simpler Hollow Road. The winding nature continues into a stretch of houses separated by long driveways after Good Shepherd Road. After turning to the northeast, and soon the east, PA 864 intersects with Fairfield Center Road, where it turns passes several farms. After the intersection with Heilman Road, PA 864 curves to the northeast once again, leaving Upper Farfield Township in favor of Mill Creek Township, where the dense wood begins to take over once again. This is short-lived, as PA 864 continues through Mill Creek, passing several farms before entering the hamlet of Huntersville. Huntersville consists of a few homes off to the side on Rabbittown Road.

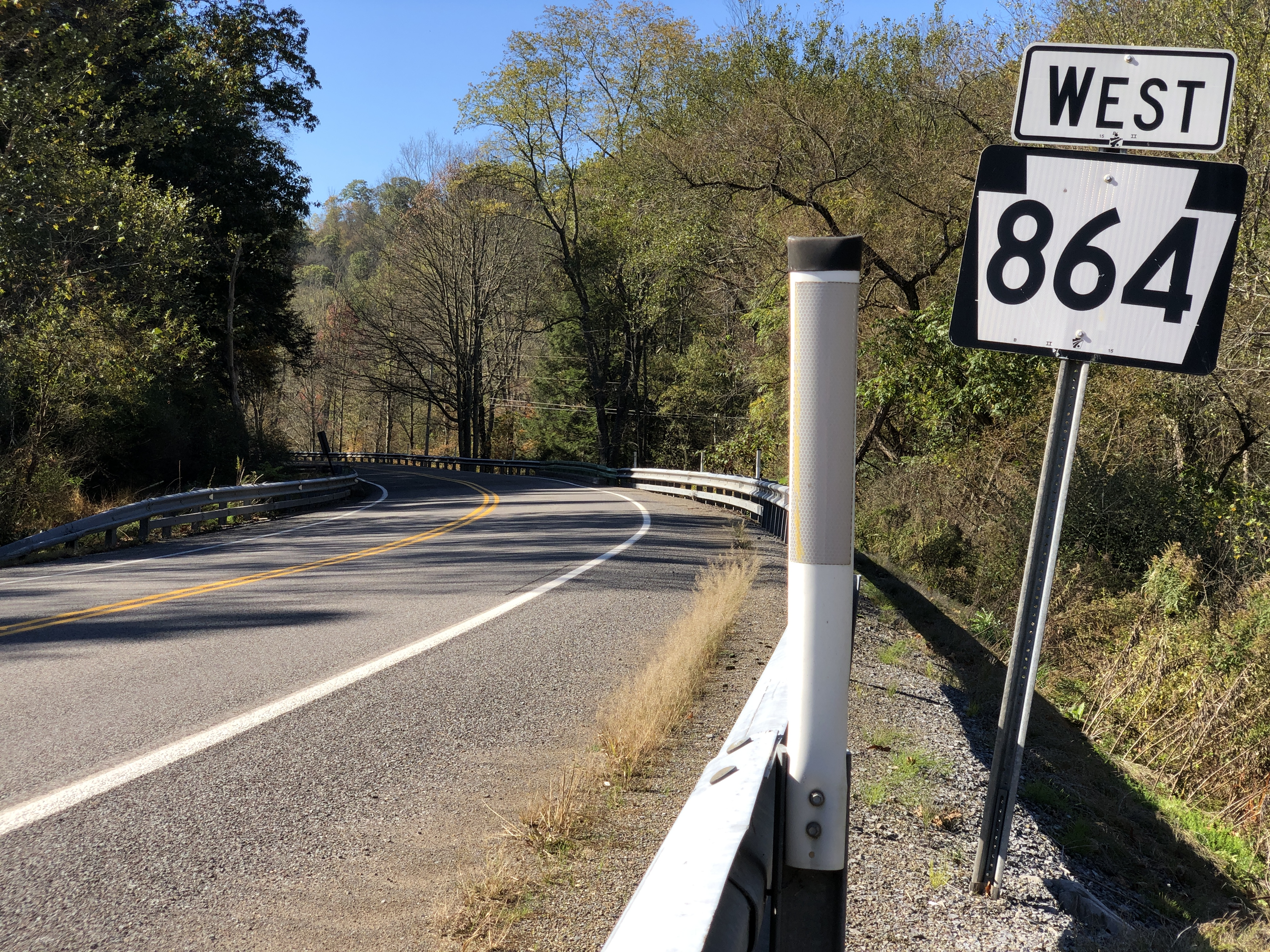
PA 864 westbound in Upper Fairfield Township

After leaving Huntersville, PA 864 turns to the southeast and enters Wolf Township. Through Wolf Township, the route remains a two-lane rural road, passing some residences before returning to dense woodlands near Lower Rynearson Road. The road makes several bends between the south and east before Laurel Run Road, where it turns to the southeast once again. The dense woods continue for another mile before PA 864 enters the borough of Picture Rocks, where it gains the moniker Laurel Run Road through downtown. The route crosses Railroad Street before intersecting with US 220 at North Main Street. This intersection serves as PA 864's eastern terminus. The right-of-way continues four blocks west to Water Street as Elm Street.

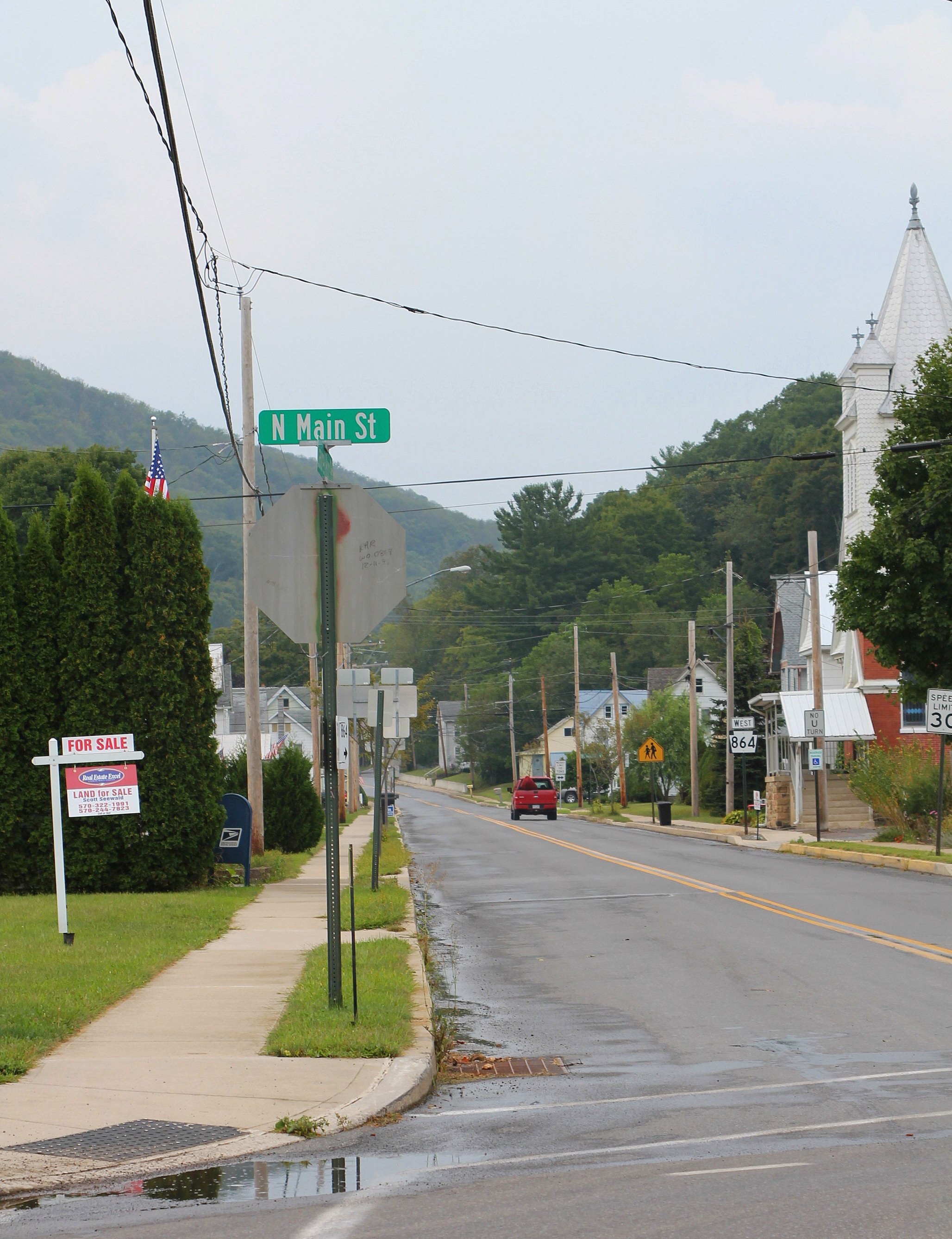
PA 864 in Picture Rocks

== Major intersections ==
The entire route is in Lycoming County.

| Location | mi | km | Destinations | Notes |
|---|---|---|---|---|
| Upper Fairfield Township | 0.00 | 0.00 | PA 87 – Montoursville, Dushore | Hamlet of Farragut; western terminus |
| Picture Rocks | 13.11 | 21.10 | US 220 (North Main Street) – Laporte, Hughesville | Eastern terminus |
1.000 mi = 1.609 km; 1.000 km = 0.621 mi
