= Pennsylvania Route 87 =

State highway in Pennsylvania, US

Pennsylvania Route 87

Route information
- Maintained by PennDOT
- Length: 69.533 mi (111.903 km)

Major junctions
- South end: I-180 / US 220 in Montoursville
- PA 864 in Upper Fairfield Township; PA 973 in Upper Fairfield Township; PA 154 in Forksville; US 220 in Dushore; PA 487 in Dushore; PA 187 in North Branch Township
- North end: US 6 in Washington Township

Location
- Country: United States
- State: Pennsylvania
- Counties: Lycoming, Sullivan, Wyoming

Highway system
- Pennsylvania State Route System; Interstate; US; State; Scenic; Legislative
← PA 86	→ PA 88

Pennsylvania Route 87 (PA 87) is a 69.3-mile-long (111.5 km) north–south state highway located in northern Pennsylvania. The southern terminus of the route is at exit 21 of Interstate 180 (I-180)/U.S. Route 220 (US 220) in Montoursville. The northern terminus is at US 6 in Washington Township.

The road is called Loyalsock Avenue at its southern terminus in Montoursville. It joins PA 154 for 200 yards (180 m) in Forksville and US 220 for 1,200 yards (1,100 m) in Dushore. While in Dushore, it serves as the northern terminus of PA 487, and is also known as South German Street, East Main Street, Mill Street, and Carpenter Street.

== Route description ==
PA 87 begins at an interchange with I-180/US 220 in the borough of Montoursville in Lycoming County, heading north on Loyalsock Avenue, a two-lane divided highway. The route immediately crosses into Fairfield Township and becomes an undivided, unnamed road, running between farmland to the west and woodland with homes to the east. The road continues into Upper Fairfield Township and heads through more agricultural areas with some residences, intersecting the western terminus of PA 864 in Farragut. PA 87 heads through more farmland and woodland with some homes to the east of the Loyalsock Creek, passing through Loyalsockville and coming to an intersection with the eastern terminus of PA 973. The road passes through more farm fields with some woods and residences in a narrow valley, crossing into Plunketts Creek Township as it heads north-northwest. The route curves to the north and the northeast before heading east into dense forests alongside the creek, heading to the northeast and continuing through scattered tracts of the Loyalsock State Forest. PA 87 heads north through more forests with a few homes, turning northeast before heading southeast. The road runs northeast through woods with a few fields and residences, curving east before turning north into more dense forests.

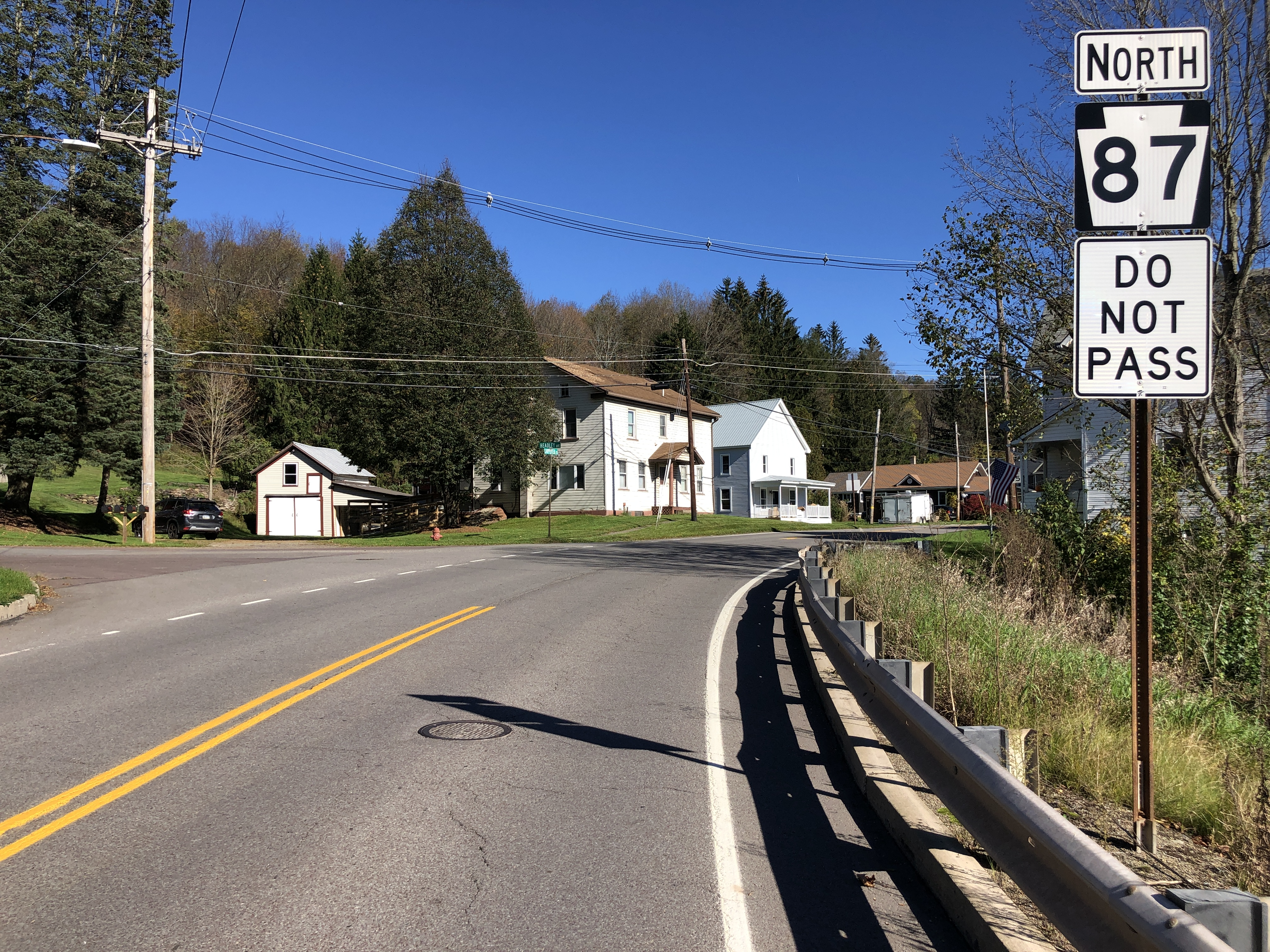
PA 87 north from PA 487 in Dushore

PA 87 enters Hillsgrove Township in Sullivan County and turns east, passing through more forests along the south bank of the Loyalsock Creek. The road continues through more forested areas with a few fields and homes, curving northeast and north. The route crosses the creek and turns northeast into agricultural areas, passing through the residential community of Hillsgrove. PA 87 runs through more farmland with some woods and homes, crossing Loyalsock Creek again and turning southeast into forests. The road curves northeast again and heads into more forested areas with some fields, heading east before crossing into Forks Township and continuing northeast through more rural areas. The route heads north before a turn to the east, heading into the borough of Forksville. Here, PA 87 passes through rural areas of homes and businesses, crossing the Loyalsock Creek and coming to an intersection with PA 154. At this point, PA 154 turns east to form a brief concurrency with PA 87, crossing the Little Loyalsock Creek. After this, PA 154 splits from PA 87 by turning northwest and PA 87 heads into forests, turning north and crossing back into Forks Township. The road continues into a narrow agricultural valley with some woods and homes, curving east at Millview. The route heads east into more forested areas to the north of Little Loyalsock Creek. PA 87 crosses into Cherry Township and runs through more forests with some fields and residences, curving northeast before heading back to the east. The route comes to an intersection with US 220, at which point PA 87 turns north to join US 220 on German Street, heading through wooded areas of homes as it enters the borough of Dushore. The road heads into the commercial center of Dushore, where PA 87 splits from US 220 by turning east onto East Main Street. The route continues onto Mill Street, passing homes and coming to an intersection with the northern terminus of PA 487, at which point it turns north onto Carpenter Street, heading northeast through more residential areas. The road crosses back into Cherry Township and becomes an unnamed road, passing through a mix of farmland and woodland with some homes. The route turns east and winds through more rural areas, entering Colley Township. PA 87 curves to the southeast and passes through Colley. The road continues east into dense forests, turning to the northeast.

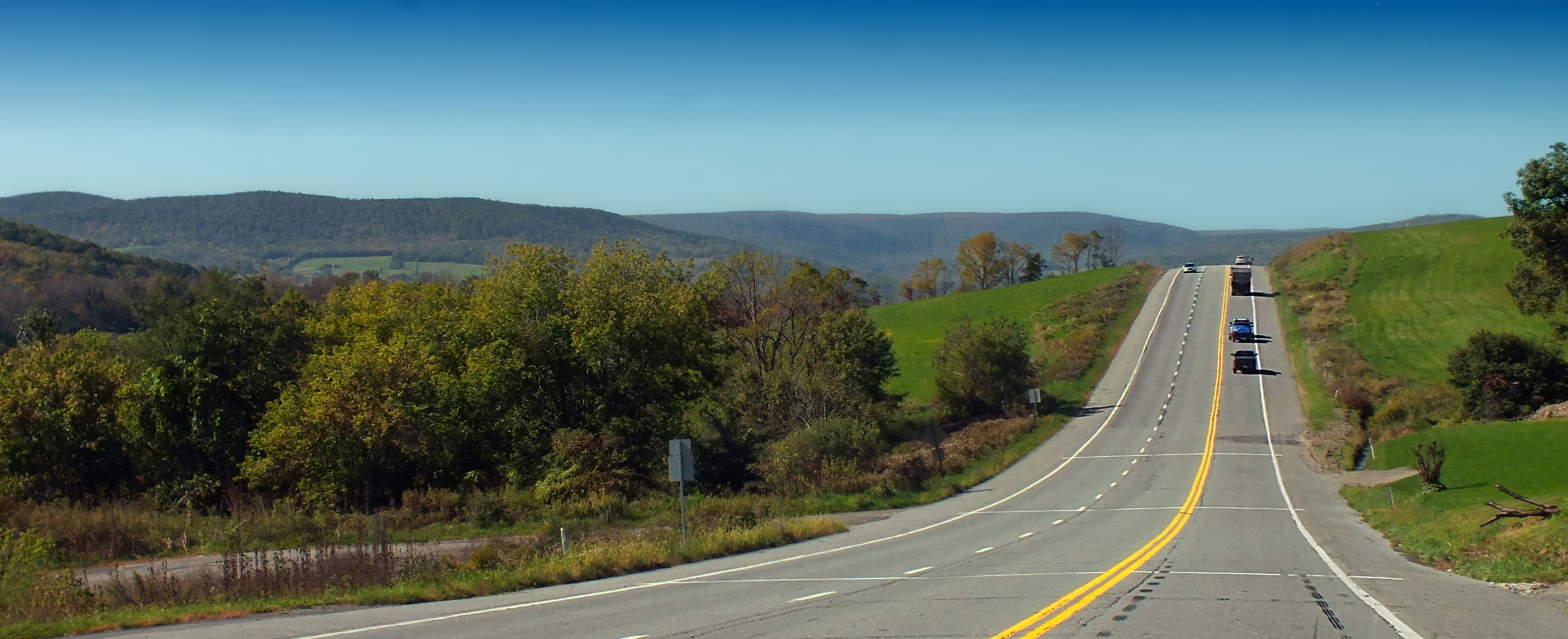
PA 87 southbound past US 6 in Mehoopany

PA 87 heads into North Branch Township in Wyoming County and continues east and northeast through more forests with occasional homes. The road comes to an intersection with the southern terminus of PA 187 near Lovelton and turns east into more rural areas. The route winds east and enters Forkston Township, running through more woodland with some farm fields and residences. PA 87 crosses the Mehoopany Creek and turns northeast, passing through more rural areas to the southeast of the creek and heading into Mehoopany Township. The road winds northeast through more farmland and woodland with some homes, crossing the Mehoopany Creek again and heading into the residential community of Mehoopany. The route continues through wooded areas of homes and passes through North Mehoopany, turning east to cross the Susquehanna River into Washington Township. The roadway passes over the Lehigh Secondary railroad line, which is owned by Norfolk Southern and operated by the Lehigh Railway, immediately after the river. The road heads to the north of a large Procter & Gamble factory before turning north into woods. PA 87 continues east into agricultural areas with some woods and homes, coming to its northern terminus at an intersection with US 6.

== Major intersections ==
County	Location	mi	km	Destinations	Notes
Lycoming	Montoursville	0.0	0.0	I-180 / US 220 (Susquehanna Beltway) – Milton, Williamsport	I-180 exit 21; southern terminus of PA 87
Lycoming	Upper Fairfield Township	2.1	3.4	PA 864 east – Picture Rocks	Western terminus of PA 864
Lycoming	Upper Fairfield Township	4.4	7.1	PA 973 west – Warrensville, Hepburnville	Eastern terminus of PA 973
Sullivan	Forksville	30.5	49.1	PA 154 south – Laporte, Eagles Mere	Southern end of concurrency with PA 154
Sullivan	Forksville	30.6	49.2	PA 154 north – Canton	Northern end of concurrency with PA 154
Sullivan	Cherry Township	42.5	68.4	US 220 south (Appalachian Throughway) – Laporte	Southern end of concurrency with US 220
Sullivan	Dushore	43.2	69.5	US 220 north (North German Street) – Towanda	Northern end of concurrency with US 220
Sullivan	Dushore	43.5	70.0	PA 487 south (Bernice Road) – Mildred	Northern terminus of PA 487
Wyoming	North Branch Township	55.9	90.0	PA 187 north	Southern terminus of PA 187
Wyoming	Washington Township	69.4	111.7	US 6 (Roosevelt Highway)	Northern terminus of PA 87
1.000 mi = 1.609 km; 1.000 km = 0.621 mi: Concurrency terminus
