= Mill Creek Township, Lycoming County, Pennsylvania =

Township in Pennsylvania, US

- Township
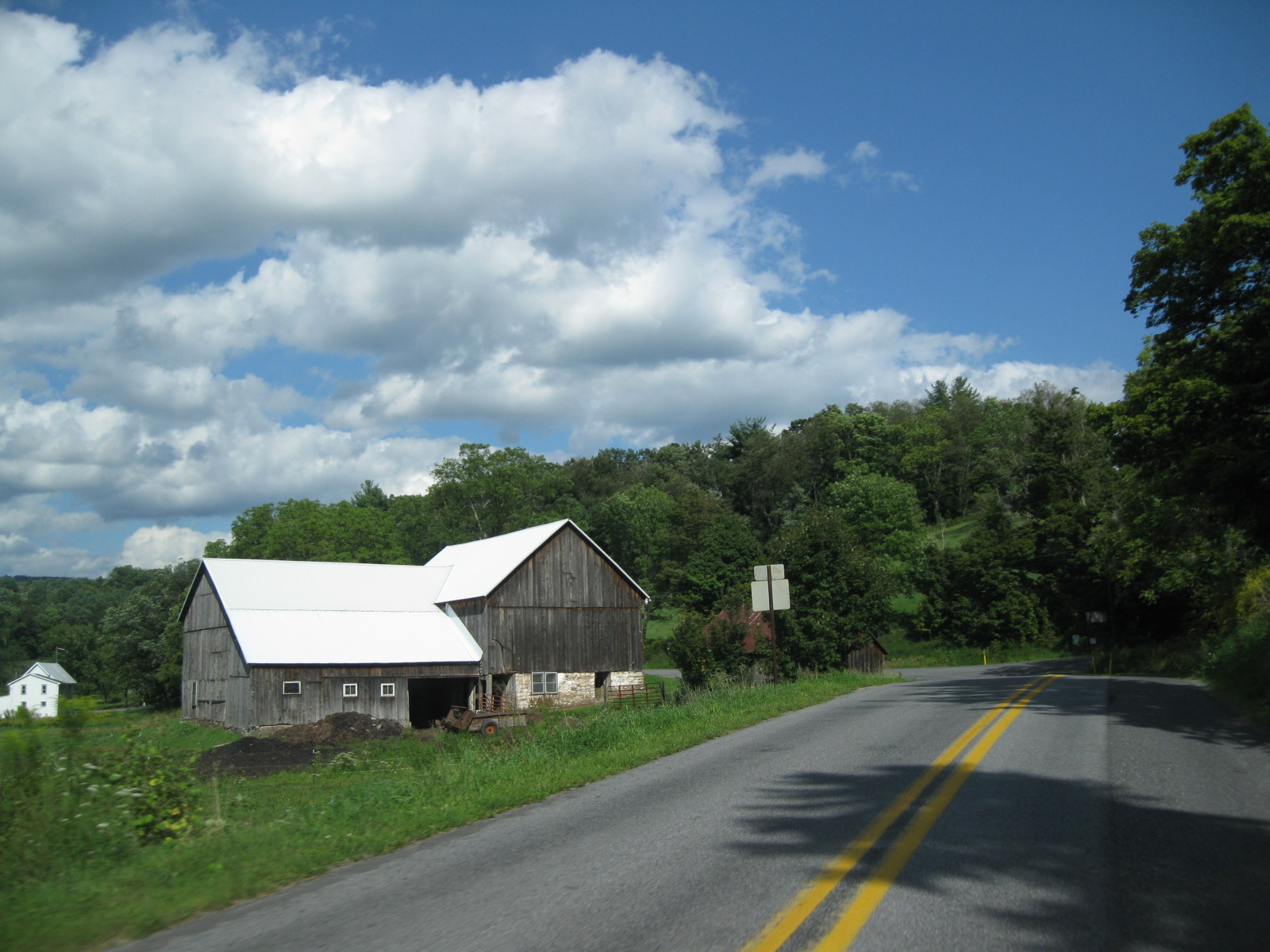
- Farm building along PA 864 in Mill Creek Township

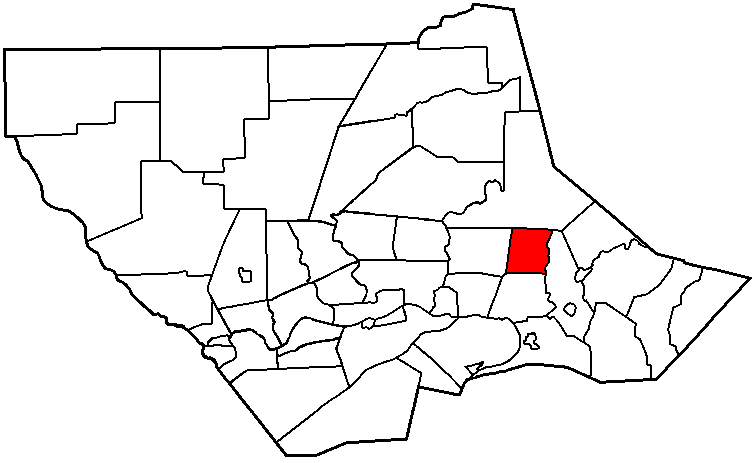
- Map of Lycoming County, Pennsylvania highlighting Mill Creek Township

- Map of Lycoming County, Pennsylvania
- Coordinates: 41°18′30″N 76°47′15″W
- Country: United States
- State: Pennsylvania
- County: Lycoming
- Settled: 1772
- Incorporated: 1879

Area
  - Total: 11.42 sq mi (29.59 km^{2})
  - Land: 11.41 sq mi (29.55 km^{2})
  - Water: 0.015 sq mi (0.04 km^{2})
- Elevation: 889 ft (271 m)

Population (2020)
  - Total: 604
  - Estimate (2021): 580 ▼
  - Density: 54.3/sq mi (20.95/km^{2})
- Time zone: UTC-5 (Eastern (EST))
  - Summer (DST): UTC-4 (EDT)
- FIPS code: 42-081-49568
- GNIS feature ID: 1216761
- Website: www.millcreektwp.com

Mill Creek Township is a township in Lycoming County, Pennsylvania, United States. The population was 580 at the 2020 census. It is part of the Williamsport Metropolitan Statistical Area.

== History ==
Mill Creek Township was formed from part of Muncy Township on February 25, 1879, by the order of a judge who certified the results of an election regarding a petition to form the new township by the residents of what was the northern portion of Muncy Township. Held on December 10, 1878, the election had been close, with a 122–104 vote in favor of the measure. The township is named for Mill Creek, a tributary of Loyalsock Creek.

== Geography ==
Mill Creek Township is in eastern Lycoming County and is bordered by Plunketts Creek Township to the north, Wolf Township to the east, Muncy Township to the south, and Upper Fairfield Township to the west. Pennsylvania Route 864 crosses the township, leading east 5 miles (8 km) to Picture Rocks and west 8 miles (13 km) to Pennsylvania Route 87 at Farragut in Upper Fairfield Township.

According to the United States Census Bureau, Mill Creek Township has a total area of 11.4 square miles (29.6 km^{2}), of which 0.02 square miles (0.04 km^{2}), or 0.15%, are water. Mill Creek flows through the center of the township from east to west, flowing to Loyalsock Creek at Montoursville. The southern part of the township is drained by Carpenters Run, which flows south via Wolf Run to the West Branch Susquehanna River north of Muncy. Allegheny Ridge, forming the southern edge of the Allegheny Plateau, is at the northern border of the township.

== Demographics ==
Historical population
Census	Pop.	Note	%±
2010	604		—
2020	580		−4.0%
2021 (est.)	583		0.5%
U.S. Decennial Census

As of the census of 2000, there were 572 people, 207 households, and 166 families residing in the township. The population density was 50.2 inhabitants per square mile (19.4/km^{2}). There were 238 housing units at an average density of 20.9/sq mi (8.1/km^{2}). The racial makeup of the township was 97.55% White, 0.35% Native American, 0.70% from other races, and 1.40% from two or more races. Hispanic or Latino of any race were 0.70% of the population.

There were 207 households, out of which 35.3% had children under the age of 18 living with them, 72.9% were married couples living together, 3.9% had a female householder with no husband present, and 19.8% were non-families. 15.5% of all households were made up of individuals, and 7.2% had someone living alone who was 65 years of age or older. The average household size was 2.76 and the average family size was 3.09.

In the township the population was spread out, with 23.8% under the age of 18, 6.8% from 18 to 24, 31.3% from 25 to 44, 28.0% from 45 to 64, and 10.1% who were 65 years of age or older. The median age was 39 years. For every 100 females there were 116.7 males. For every 100 females age 18 and over, there were 116.9 males.

The median income for a household in the township was $50,139, and the median income for a family was $51,346. Males had a median income of $36,875 versus $25,694 for females. The per capita income for the township was $22,034. About 1.9% of families and 2.2% of the population were below the poverty line, including none of those under age 18 and 20.0% of those age 65 or over.
