= John Klepper =

American politician

John W. Klepper

Member of the Pennsylvania House of Representatives from the 84th district
- In office 1971–1972
- Preceded by: Alvin C. Bush
- Succeeded by: Joseph V. Grieco

Personal details
- Born: October 23, 1906 Montoursville, Pennsylvania, U.S.
- Died: November 13, 1997 (aged 91) Williamsport, Pennsylvania, U.S.
- Party: Democratic

John W. Klepper (October 23, 1906 – November 13, 1997) was a former Democratic member of the Pennsylvania House of Representatives.
