= Upper Fairfield Township, Pennsylvania =

Township in Pennsylvania, US

Upper Fairfield Township, Lycoming County, Pennsylvania
- Township
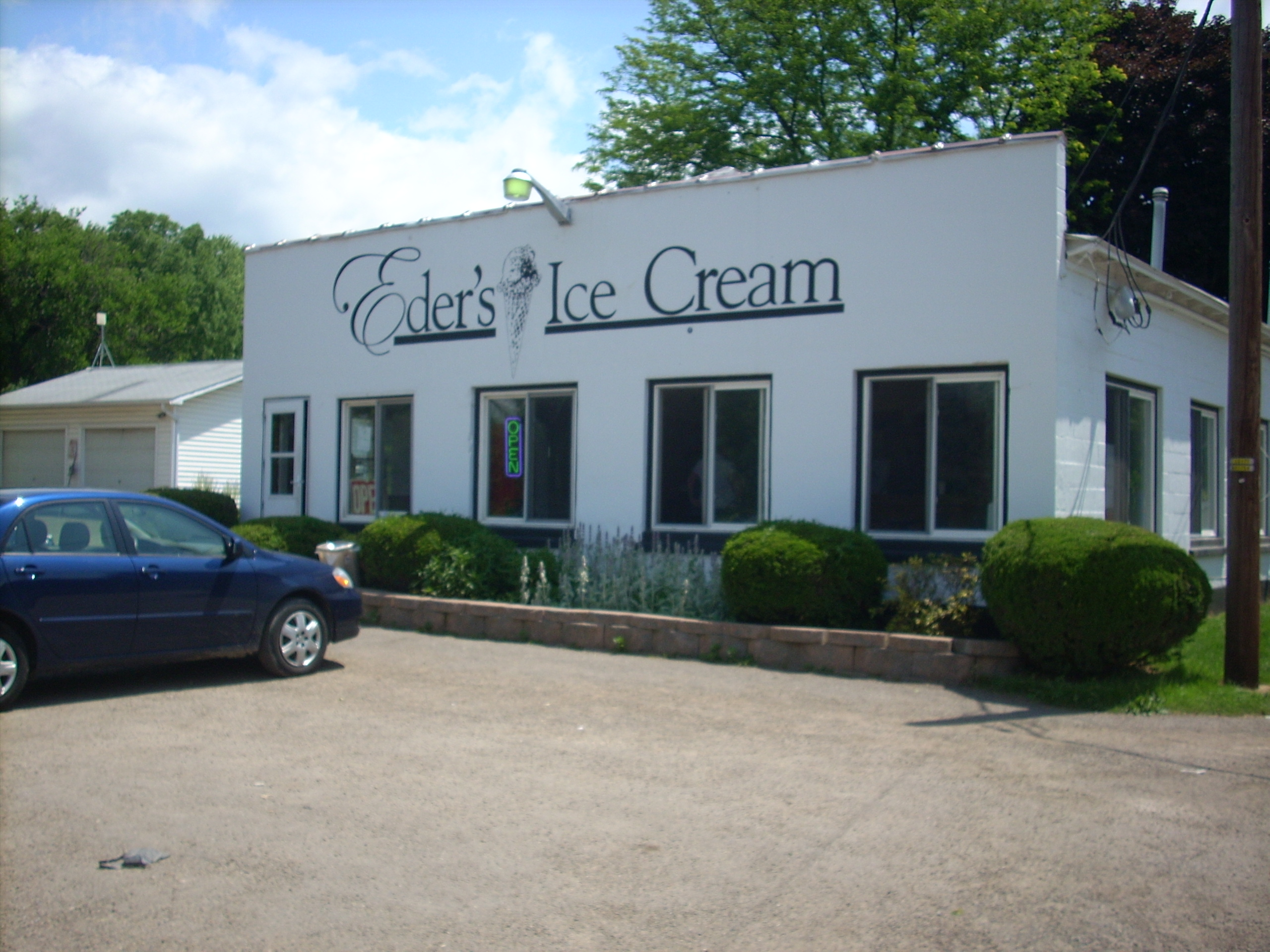
- Eder's Ice Cream in Upper Fairfield Township

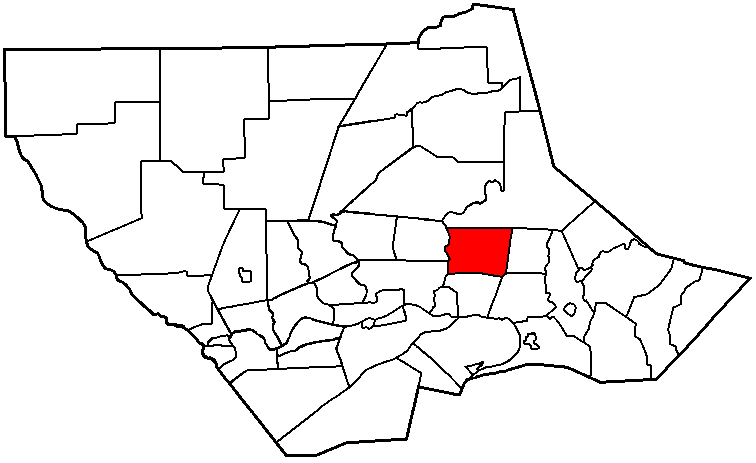
- Map of Lycoming County, Pennsylvania highlighting Upper Fairfield Township

- Map of Lycoming County, Pennsylvania
- Coordinates: 41°19′10″N 76°51′41″W
- Country: United States
- State: Pennsylvania
- County: Lycoming
- Settled: 1800
- Incorporated: 1851

Area
  - Total: 18.12 sq mi (46.93 km^{2})
  - Land: 17.96 sq mi (46.52 km^{2})
  - Water: 0.15 sq mi (0.40 km^{2})
- Elevation: 896 ft (273 m)

Population (2020)
  - Total: 1,807 ▼
  - Estimate (2021): 1,801
  - Density: 100/sq mi (38.8/km^{2})
- Time zone: UTC-5 (Eastern (EST))
  - Summer (DST): UTC-4 (EDT)
- FIPS code: 42-081-79024
- GNIS feature ID: 1216774
- Website: upperfairfieldtwp.org

Upper Fairfield Township is a township in Lycoming County, Pennsylvania, United States. The population was 1,807 at the 2020 census. It is part of the Williamsport Metropolitan Statistical Area.

== History ==
The history of Upper Fairfield Township begins in 1851 when some dissatisfied citizens of the southern portion of Fairfield Township asked to be separated from the neighbors to the north. The citizens of the northern portion were strongly opposed to division, but the township was divided against their wishes on September 12, 1851.

Upper Fairfield Township was called Pollock Township during its first two years. It was named for Judge James Pollock, president of the district court that ordered the township to be divided, and a controversial figure at the time. Since the citizens of Upper Fairfield Township opposed division, they were disturbed by its name. Following a petition to the court that the township's name be changed, an act of the Pennsylvania General Assembly changed the name to Upper Fairfield Township on January 29, 1853.

== Geography ==
Upper Fairfield Township is in east-central Lycoming County and is bordered by Plunketts Creek Township to the north, Mill Creek Township to the east, Muncy Township to the southeast, Fairfield Township to the south, Loyalsock Township to the southwest, and Eldred Township to the west. Loyalsock Creek is the boundary line between Upper Fairfield and Loyalsock townships as well as Upper Fairfield and Eldred.

Pennsylvania Route 87 crosses the west side of the township, following Loyalsock Creek. The highway leads south 3 miles (5 km) to Montoursville and northeast 28 miles (45 km) to Forksville. PA-87 passes through the unincorporated communities of Farragut and Loyalsockville in the township, Farragut to the south and Loyalsockville to the north. Pennsylvania Route 864 has its western terminus at PA-87 in Farragut and leads east up the valley of Mill Creek, passing through Fairfield Center near the eastern border of the township and continuing east 8 miles (13 km) to Picture Rocks. Williamsport, the Lycoming county seat, is 10 miles (16 km) southwest of the township.

According to the United States Census Bureau, the township has a total area of 18.1 square miles (46.9 km^{2}), of which 18.0 square miles (46.5 km^{2}) are land and 0.2 square miles (0.4 km^{2}), or 0.86%, are water.

== Demographics ==
Historical population
Census	Pop.	Note	%±
2010	1,823		—
2020	1,807		−0.9%
2021 (est.)	1,801		−0.3%
U.S. Decennial Census

As of the census of 2000, there were 1,854 people, 682 households, and 544 families residing in the township. The population density was 102.4 inhabitants per square mile (39.5/km^{2}). There were 736 housing units at an average density of 40.6 per square mile (15.7/km^{2}). The racial makeup of the township was 99.35% White, 0.05% from other races, and 0.59% from two or more races. Hispanic or Latino of any race were 0.49% of the population.

There were 682 households, out of which 36.4% had children under the age of 18 living with them, 69.4% were married couples living together, 6.7% had a female householder with no husband present, and 20.2% were non-families. 16.7% of all households were made up of individuals, and 6.9% had someone living alone who was 65 years of age or older. The average household size was 2.72 and the average family size was 3.06.

In the township the population was spread out, with 26.5% under the age of 18, 6.6% from 18 to 24, 28.7% from 25 to 44, 28.0% from 45 to 64, and 10.2% who were 65 years of age or older. The median age was 38 years. For every 100 females there were 96.6 males. For every 100 females age 18 and over, there were 96.4 males.

The median income for a household in the township was $42,031, and the median income for a family was $47,500. Males had a median income of $29,896 versus $23,380 for females. The per capita income for the township was $18,193. About 4.7% of families and 6.2% of the population were below the poverty line, including 3.3% of those under age 18 and 10.2% of those age 65 or over.
