= Alvin C. Bush =

American politician

Member of the Pennsylvania House of Representatives from the 84th district
- In office 1969–1970
- Preceded by: District created
- Succeeded by: John W. Klepper
- In office 1985–1994
- Preceded by: Joseph V. Grieco
- Succeeded by: Brett O. Feese

Member of the Pennsylvania House of Representatives from the Lycoming County district
- In office 1961–1968

Personal details
- Born: January 22, 1924 Philipsburg, Pennsylvania
- Died: February 8, 2017 (aged 93) Montoursville, Pennsylvania
- Party: Republican

Alvin C. Bush (January 22, 1924 – February 8, 2017) was a Republican member of the Pennsylvania House of Representatives.
