= Mehoopany =

Mehoopany may refer to the following places in Pennsylvania:

- Mehoopany Creek, a tributary of the North Branch Susquehanna River in Sullivan and Wyoming Counties
- Mehoopany Township, Wyoming County
- Mehoopany, Pennsylvania
- North Mehoopany, Pennsylvania
