= Joseph D. Hamm =

American politician

Joe Hamm

Member of the Pennsylvania House of Representatives from the 84th district
- Incumbent
- Assumed office December 1, 2020
- Preceded by: Garth Everett

Personal details
- Born: Joseph D. Hamm
- Party: Republican
- Spouse: Melissa Hamm
- Education: Lock Haven University of Pennsylvania (BA)

Military service
- Branch/service: United States Army
- Unit: Pennsylvania Army National Guard
- Battles/wars: Iraq War

Joseph D. Hamm is an American politician serving as a member of the Pennsylvania House of Representatives from the 84th district. Elected in November 2020, he assumed office on December 1, 2020.

== Education ==
Hamm graduated from Williamsport Area High School in 2003 and earned a Bachelor of Arts degree in political science from Lock Haven University of Pennsylvania in 2009. Hamm's career experience includes working as a borough manager.

== Career ==
After graduating from high school, Hamm enlisted in the Pennsylvania Army National Guard. He served until 2008, including a one-year tour in Iraq. After earning his college degree, Hamm served as borough manager of Jersey Shore, Pennsylvania and a member of the Hepburn Township Board of Supervisors.

And hamm was assigned to the following committees:

- House Local Government Committee
- House Veterans Affairs & Emergency Preparedness Committee
- House Environmental Resources & Energy Committee
- House Game & Fisheries Committee
