= Williamsport Area High School =

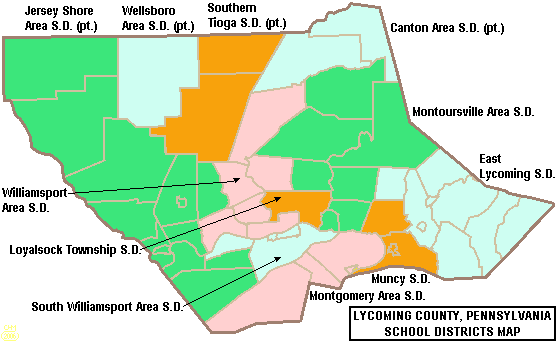

Location
- 2990 West Fourth Street; Williamsport, Lycoming, Pennsylvania 17701-9134; United States; 41.2414°N 77.0738°W

Information
- Type: Public
- Principal: Justin Ross
- Faculty: 101.72 (FTE)
- Grades: 9-12
- Enrollment: 1,489 (2017–18)
- Student to teacher ratio: 14.64
- Language: English
- Colors: Cherry and white
- Team name: Millionaires
- Feeder schools: Williamsport Area Middle School
- Website: https://www.wasd.org

Williamsport Area High School is a large, urban, public high school located in Williamsport, Lycoming County, Pennsylvania. The school is located at 2990 West 4th Street, Williamsport. In the 2017–18 school year, enrollment was reported as 1,489 pupils in 9th through 12th grades.

== Extracurriculars ==
Williamsport Area High School offers a wide variety of clubs, activities and an extensive, publicly funded sports program.

=== Sports ===
The district funds:

Varsity

Boys

- Baseball - AAAA
- Basketball- AAAA
- Cross country - AAA
- Football - AAAAAA
- Golf - AAA
- Indoor track and field - AAAA
- Soccer - AAA
- Swimming and diving - AAA
- Tennis - AAA
- Track and field - AAA
- Wrestling - AAA

Girls

- Basketball - AAAA
- Cheer - AAAA
- Cross country - AAA
- Golf - AAA
- Indoor track and field - AAAA
- Soccer - AAA
- Softball - AAAA
- Swimming and diving - AAA
- Tennis - AAA
- Track and field - AAA

According to PIAA directory July 2015

== Notable alumni ==
- Joseph Fagnano (class of 2019), American football quarterback
- Joseph D. Hamm (class of 2003), politician
