= Brett Feese =

American politician

Brett O. Feese

Member of the Pennsylvania House of Representatives from the 84th district
- In office January 3, 1995 – November 30, 2006
- Preceded by: Alvin Bush
- Succeeded by: Garth Everett

Republican Whip of the Pennsylvania House of Representatives
- In office April 15, 2003 – November 30, 2004
- Preceded by: Sam Smith
- Succeeded by: Dave Argall

District Attorney of Lycoming County
- In office 1984–1992
- Preceded by: Kenneth Brown
- Succeeded by: Tom Marino

Personal details
- Born: May 21, 1954 (age 72) Danville, Pennsylvania
- Party: Republican
- Spouse: Gwendolyn

Brett O. Feese (born May 21, 1954) is a former Republican member of the Pennsylvania House of Representatives.

He is a 1972 graduate of Montoursville High School. He earned a degree from Indiana University of Pennsylvania in 1976 and a J.D. from the Dickinson School of Law in 1979.

He served as District Attorney of Lycoming County, Pennsylvania. He was first elected to represent the 84th legislative district in 1994. Feese retired prior to the 2006 Pennsylvania House of Representatives election.

He was considered a possible Republican successor for Don Sherwood's congressional seat, should Sherwood retire.

== Indictment ==
Brett O. Feese was the Republican House Caucus legal counsel immediately prior to his indictment for his role in Computergate by the Pennsylvania Statewide Investigative Grand Jury. On November 8, 2011, Feese was found guilty by a Dauphin County jury on all 40 counts. (11-9-11 Williamsport Sun-Gazette, p. A-1 and A-5).

Along with John Perzel, and several others, Republican PA House Caucus legal counsel Feese was indicted on November 12, 2009, on 62 counts of participating in the 2006 Pennsylvania General Assembly bonus controversy also known as Computergate, a scheme that used state funds for private political campaigning.<Pittsburgh Post-Gazette reference>

On February 10, 2012, Dauphin County judge Richard Lewis sentenced Republican House Caucus legal counsel Feese to 4 to 12 years in state prison, an additional 2 years of probation, a $25,000.00 fine, and $1,000,000.00 in restitution for his role in the corruption scandal. Feese remained free on bail and was ordered to report to prison on February 28, 2012 to begin serving his state prison sentence if denied appeal bail by the appellate courts. (2-11-12 Williamsport Sun-Gazette, p. A-1 and A-5).

Feese surrendered his law license in November 2014 to the Pa. Lawyer Disciplinary Board almost 3 years after he had been sentenced to state prison.

Brett O. Feese is tentatively scheduled to be released on parole from SCI-Waymart on Sunday June 26, 2015.
