= Joseph V. Grieco =

American politician

Member of the Pennsylvania House of Representatives from the 84th district
- In office 1973–1984
- Preceded by: John W. Klepper
- Succeeded by: Alvin C. Bush

Personal details
- Born: March 17, 1915 Jersey Shore, Pennsylvania
- Died: January 2, 2006 (aged 90) Jersey Shore, Pennsylvania
- Party: Republican

Joseph V. Grieco (March 17, 1915 – January 2, 2006) was a former Republican member of the Pennsylvania House of Representatives.
