= Garth Everett =

American politician (1954–2023)

Garth D. Everett
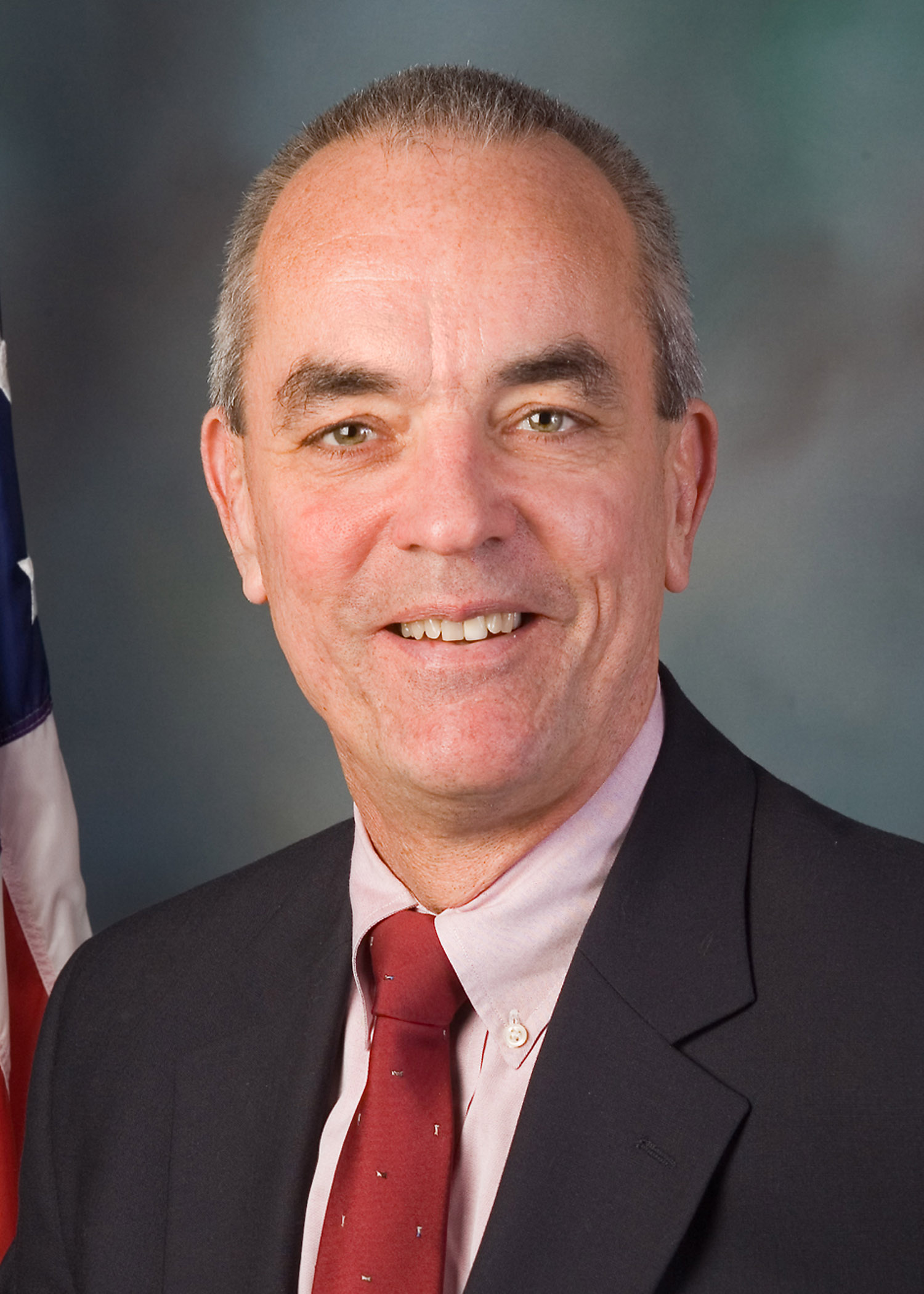

Member of the Pennsylvania House of Representatives from the 84th district
- In office January 2, 2007 – November 30, 2020
- Preceded by: Brett Feese
- Succeeded by: Joseph D. Hamm

Personal details
- Born: January 28, 1954 Montoursville, Pennsylvania, U.S.
- Died: January 28, 2023 (aged 69) Williamsport, Pennsylvania, U.S.
- Party: Republican
- Spouse: Susan S. Schultz (m. 1976)
- Children: 2
- Education: Pennsylvania State University (BS, JD)

Military service
- Allegiance: United States
- Branch/service: United States Air Force
- Years of service: 1976–1997
- Rank: Lieutenant colonel

Garth David Everett (January 28, 1954 – January 28, 2023) was an American politician who served as a member of the Pennsylvania House of Representatives for the 84th district from 2007 to 2020.

== Early life, education, and military career ==
Everett was born on January 28, 1954 in Montoursville, Pennsylvania to parents Maxine (née Schrader) and David Everett. He graduated from Montoursville Area High School in 1972. Everett earned a ROTC scholarship to Colby College in Maine, before transferring to Pennsylvania State University after two years when the college's ROTC program was shut down. He earned a bachelor of science degree in business from Pennsylvania State University in 1976. The same year Everett joined the United States Air Force. He retired from the Air Force at the rank of lieutenant colonel in 1997. He later earned a juris doctor degree from Dickinson School of Law in 2000.

== Political career ==
In 2006, Everett was elected to represent the 84th district in the Pennsylvania House of Representatives. He was continuously reelected until his retirement in 2020. During his final term, Everett chaired the House State Government Committee. In his role as chair, Everett pushed for a ban on lawmakers receiving gifts from lobbyists. He also oversaw the advancement of an omnibus bill that expanded mail-in voting and voter registration and eliminated straight ticket voting.

Ahead of the 2020 United States presidential election, Everett introduced a resolution that would have established a select committee to oversee the integrity of the upcoming election. The committee would have the power to subpoena, investigate county election operations, and subsequently suggest changes to the state election code. Democrats opposed the establishment of the committee, claiming it would enable Republicans to override the election results after President Donald Trump stoked pre-election claims of ballot fraud. Everett's resolution to establish the committee was never voted on by the State House after the House session was postponed due to a lawmaker's COVID-19 diagnosis.

== Personal life and death ==
Everett met his wife, the former Susan S. Schultz, in high school and married her in 1976. The couple had two daughters.

Everett died in Williamsport, Pennsylvania on January 28, 2023, his 69th birthday. At the time, Everett had been fighting cancer for 18 years.

== Electoral history ==
2006 Pennsylvania House of Representatives Republican primary election, District 84
Party	Candidate	Votes	%
Republican	Garth Everett	3,931	65.41
Republican	Russell C. Reitz	1,158	19.27
Republican	Carla O. Auten	921	15.32
Total votes		6,010	100.00

2006 Pennsylvania House of Representatives election, District 84
Party	Candidate	Votes	%
Republican	Garth Everett	11,585	63.30
Democratic	Thomas Paternostro	6,697	36.59
Write-in		21	0.11
Total votes		18,303	100.00

2008 Pennsylvania House of Representatives election, District 84
Party	Candidate	Votes	%
Republican	Garth Everett	20,888	99.36
Write-in		135	0.64
Total votes		21,023	100.00

2010 Pennsylvania House of Representatives election, District 84
Party	Candidate	Votes	%
Republican	Garth Everett	15,710	99.00
Write-in		159	1.00
Total votes		15,869	100.00

2012 Pennsylvania House of Representatives election, District 84
Party	Candidate	Votes	%
Republican	Garth Everett	20,265	99.05
Write-in		195	0.95
Total votes		15,869	100.00

2014 Pennsylvania House of Representatives election, District 84
Party	Candidate	Votes	%
Republican	Garth Everett	13,750	79.89
Democratic	Kristen Hayes	3,462	20.11
Total votes		17,212	100.00

2016 Pennsylvania House of Representatives election, District 84
Party	Candidate	Votes	%
Republican	Garth Everett	Unopposed	
Total votes		24,765	100.00

2018 Pennsylvania House of Representatives election, District 84
Party	Candidate	Votes	%
Republican	Garth Everett	18,192	78.85
Democratic	Lina Kay Sosniak	4,855	21.04
Write-in		25	0.11
Total votes		23,072	100.00
