= Fairfield Township, Lycoming County, Pennsylvania =

Township in Pennsylvania, US

- Township
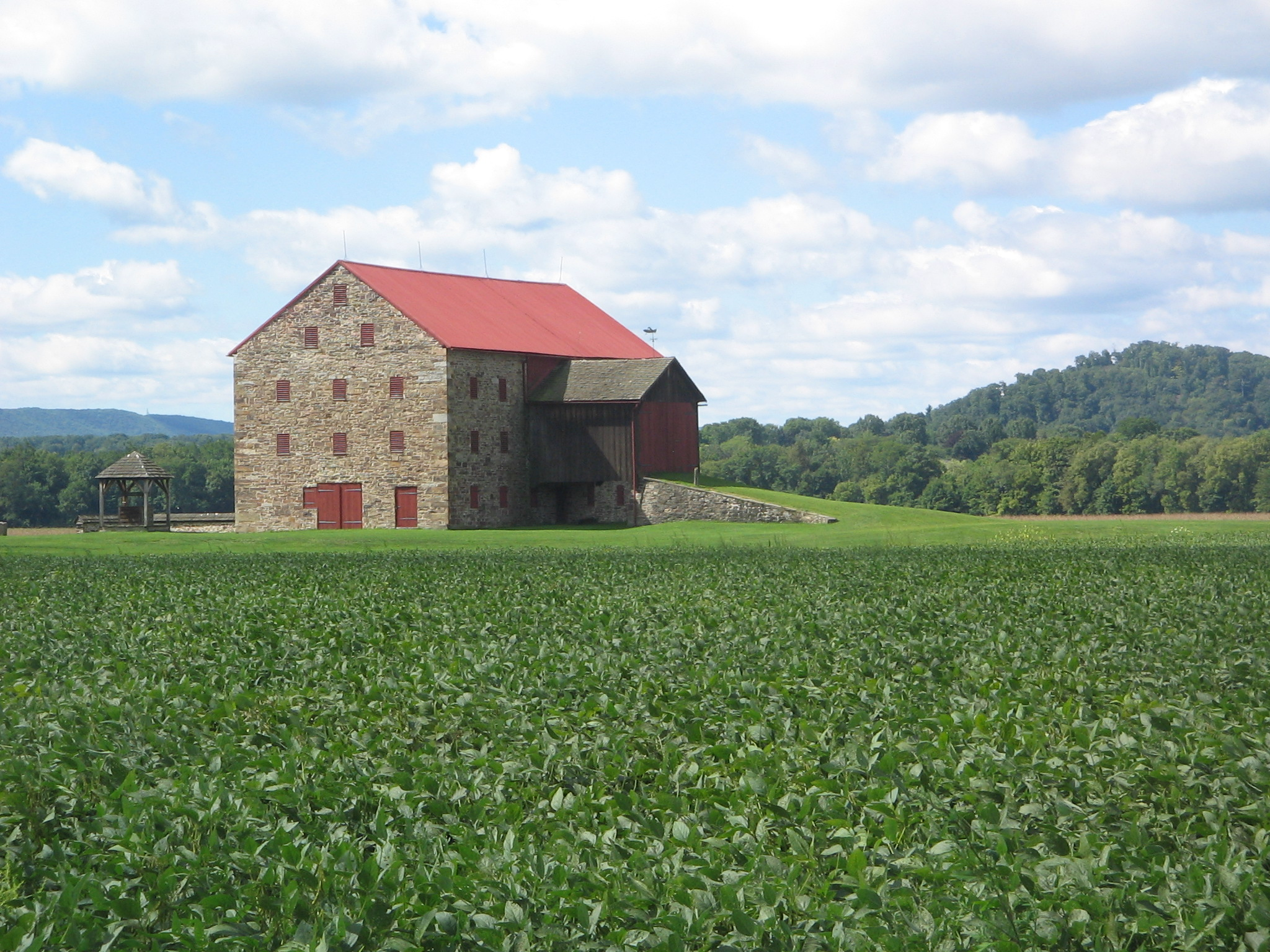
- Old stone barn near Pennsylvania Route 87

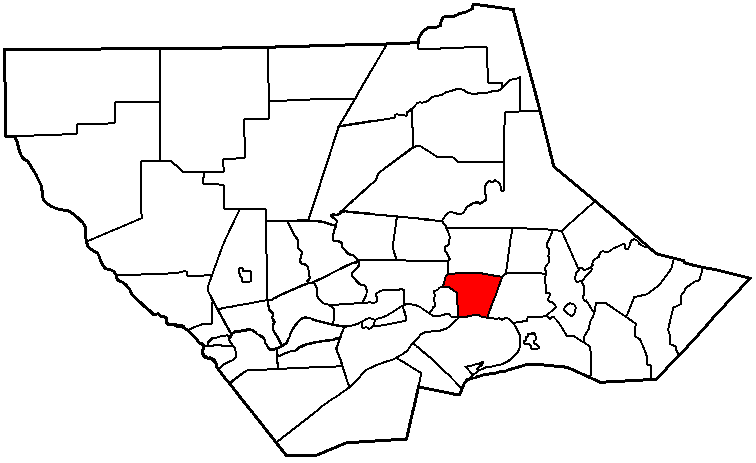
- Map of Lycoming County, Pennsylvania highlighting Fairfield Township

- Map of Lycoming County, Pennsylvania
- Coordinates: 41°15′17″N 76°52′35″W
- Country: United States
- State: Pennsylvania
- County: Lycoming
- Settled: 1742
- Formed: 1825 or 1826

Area
  - Total: 12.36 sq mi (32.00 km^{2})
  - Land: 12.14 sq mi (31.43 km^{2})
  - Water: 0.22 sq mi (0.57 km^{2}) 1.02%
- Elevation: 646 ft (197 m)

Population (2020)
  - Total: 2,833 ▲
  - Estimate (2021): 2,818
  - Density: 228.5/sq mi (88.22/km^{2})
- Time zone: UTC-5 (Eastern Time Zone (North America))
  - Summer (DST): UTC-4 (EDT)
- FIPS code: 42-081-24592
- GNIS feature ID: 1216748
- Website: fairfieldlycoming.org

Fairfield Township is a township in Lycoming County, Pennsylvania, United States. The population was 2,833 at the 2020 census. It is part of the Williamsport Metropolitan Statistical Area.

== History ==
The exact date of the formation of Fairfield Township is not known, but court records point to sometime between August 1825 and December 1826. A petition for the division of Muncy Township was read in court in August 1825. Historical records do not record when the township was formed, but court documents cite Fairfield Township as the residence of a defendant in a lawsuit in a Columbia County court session in 1826.

John Andrew Shulze retired to Fairfield Township following his 1823–1829 term as governor of Pennsylvania. Shulze bought 500 acres (2.0 km^{2}) in western Fairfield Township, now part of Montoursville, for $12,000. His plan was to spend his retirement farming in the West Branch Susquehanna Valley. Shulze quickly made am impact in Fairfield Township. He built a brick house on his farm and donated an acre of land for the construction of Union Church, which was shared by the Lutheran and Presbyterian congregations of Montoursville and Fairfield Township. Ultimately Shulze's time in Fairfield Township can be described as a sad failure. His repeated attempts at farming were unsuccessful. He also lost a lawsuit filed by William Cameron of Lewisburg for $3,835.49. Shulze was apparently unable to pay the suit, and his property was seized and sold to pay his debt. Governor Shulze then took up residence in Montoursville, lost even more lawsuits and eventually moved to Lancaster in 1846, where he lived until his death in 1852. As of 2007, Schulze's Montoursville home is the "Governor Schulze House" bed and breakfast.

Fairfield Township's population has grown since the 1890 census when 468 residents were counted. The census of 2010 counted 2,792 residents. Fairfield Township has many residential neighborhoods that are contiguous with the neighboring borough of Montoursville.

== Geography ==
Fairfield Township is in southeastern Lycoming County and is bordered by Upper Fairfield Township to the north, Muncy Township to the east, the West Branch Susquehanna River to the south, the borough of Montoursville to the west, and Loyalsock Township to the northwest. Loyalsock Creek forms the boundary between Fairfield and Loyalsock townships.

Interstate 180 passes through the township, with access from Exit 20 (Fairfield Road) and Exit 21 (Pennsylvania Route 87). U.S. Route 220 runs concurrently with I-180 through the township. I-180/US-220 leads westward 6 miles (10 km) to Williamsport, the Lycoming county seat, and I-180 leads southeastward 20 miles (32 km) to Interstate 80 near Milton. US-220 leads east 10 miles (16 km) to Hughesville. PA 87 runs through the northwestern part of the township, leading northeastward up the Loyalsock Creek valley 30 miles (48 km) to Forksville.

According to the United States Census Bureau, Fairfield Township has a total area of 12.4 square miles (32.0 km^{2}), of which 12.1 square miles (31.4 km^{2}) are land and 0.2 square miles (0.6 km^{2}), or 1.77%, are water.

== Demographics ==
Historical population
Census	Pop.	Note	%±
2010	2,792		—
2020	2,833		1.5%
2021 (est.)	2,818		−0.5%
U.S. Decennial Census

As of the census of 2000, there were 2,659 people, 1,020 households, and 781 families residing in the township. The population density was 228.8 inhabitants per square mile (88.3/km^{2}). There were 1,100 housing units at an average density of 94.7 per square mile (36.6/km^{2}). The racial makeup of the township was 97.97% White, 0.60% African American, 0.30% Native American, 0.38% Asian, 0.04% from other races, and 0.71% from two or more races. Hispanic or Latino of any race were 0.53% of the population.

There were 1,020 households, out of which 35.4% had children under the age of 18 living with them, 65.3% were married couples living together, 7.0% had a female householder with no husband present, and 23.4% were non-families. 18.5% of all households were made up of individuals, and 8.0% had someone living alone who was 65 years of age or older. The average household size was 2.61 and the average family size was 2.96.

In the township the population was spread out, with 26.2% under the age of 18, 6.5% from 18 to 24, 28.0% from 25 to 44, 25.6% from 45 to 64, and 13.7% who were 65 years of age or older. The median age was 39 years. For every 100 females there were 94.8 males. For every 100 females age 18 and over, there were 93.8 males.

The median income for a household in the township was $43,438, and the median income for a family was $49,570. Males had a median income of $37,034 versus $22,826 for females. The per capita income for the township was $19,807. About 4.1% of families and 6.4% of the population were below the poverty line, including 7.9% of those under age 18 and 3.0% of those age 65 or over.

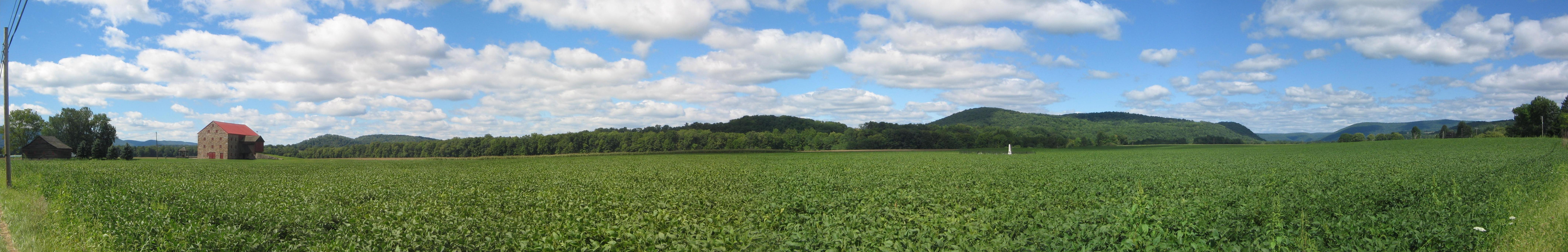
Panoramic view of Fairfield Township taken from Pennsylvania Route 87. The left side is south, with Bald Eagle Mountain visible on the horizon behind the old barn. There is an early cemetery in the middle of the field. The right side is north, with the opening of the Loyalsock Creek valley visible in the dissected Allegheny Plateau. This view is approximately 180 degrees.
