= Washington Township, Wyoming County, Pennsylvania =

Township in Pennsylvania, US

Washington Township
- Township
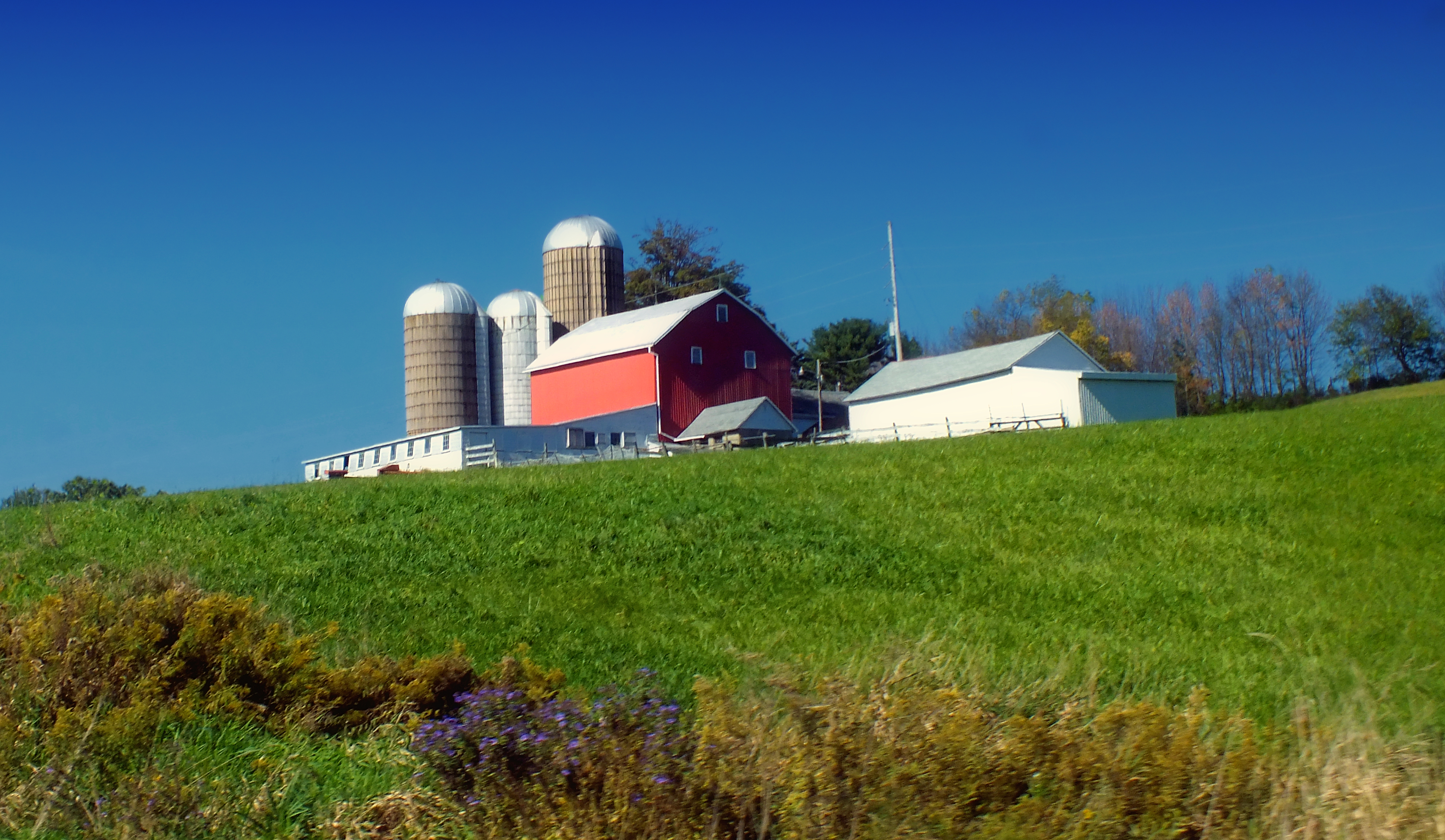
- A farm in the township

- Location of Washington Township in Pennsylvania
- Coordinates: 41°35′00″N 76°00′59″W
- Country: United States
- State: Pennsylvania
- County: Wyoming

Area
  - Total: 19.40 sq mi (50.24 km^{2})
  - Land: 18.75 sq mi (48.56 km^{2})
  - Water: 0.65 sq mi (1.69 km^{2})
- Elevation: 1,155 ft (352 m)

Population (2020)
  - Total: 1,337 ▼
  - Estimate (2021): 1,333
  - Density: 72.2/sq mi (27.87/km^{2})
- Time zone: UTC-5 (EST)
  - Summer (DST): UTC-4 (EDT)
- Area code: 570
- FIPS code: 42-131-81344
- Website: https://washingtontwpwyco.org/

Washington Township is a township in Wyoming County, Pennsylvania, United States. The population was 1,337 at the 2020 census.

== Geography ==
According to the United States Census Bureau, the township has a total area of 19.3 square miles (50.0 km^{2}), of which 18.7 square miles (48.4 km^{2}) is land and 0.6 square mile (1.6 km^{2}) (3.21%) is water.

== Demographics ==
Historical population
Census	Pop.	Note	%±
2010	1,412		—
2020	1,337		−5.3%
2021 (est.)	1,333		−0.3%
U.S. Decennial Census

As of the census of 2010, there were 1,412 people, 516 households, and 390 families residing in the township. The population density was 75.5 inhabitants per square mile (29.2/km^{2}). There were 569 housing units at an average density of 30.4 per square mile (11.7/km^{2}). The racial makeup of the township was 97.1% White, 0.57% Black or African American, 0.57% Native American, 0.29% from other races, and 1.56% from two or more races. Hispanic or Latino of any race were 1.42% of the population.

There were 516 households, out of which 36.2% had children under the age of 18 living with them, 58.3% were married couples living together, 11.2% had a female householder with no husband present, and 24.4% were non-families. 25.0% of all households were made up of individuals, and 5.4% had someone living alone who was 65 years of age or older. The average household size was 2.74 and the average family size was 3.09.

In the township, the population was spread out, with 25.6% under the age of 18, 7.4% from 18 to 24, 24.8% from 25 to 44, 28.4% from 45 to 64, and 13.8% who were 65 years of age or older. The median age was 39.1 years. For every 100 females, there were 98.0 males. For every 100 females age 18 and over, there were 99.1 males.

The median income for a household in the township was $51,447, and the median income for a family was $62,500. Males had a median income of $48,203 versus $25,697 for females. The per capita income for the township was $23,028. About 9.6% of families and 10.4% of the population were below the poverty line, including 17.5% of those under age 18 and 5.0% of those age 65 or over.
