= Shrewsbury Township, Lycoming County, Pennsylvania =

Township in Pennsylvania, US

- Township
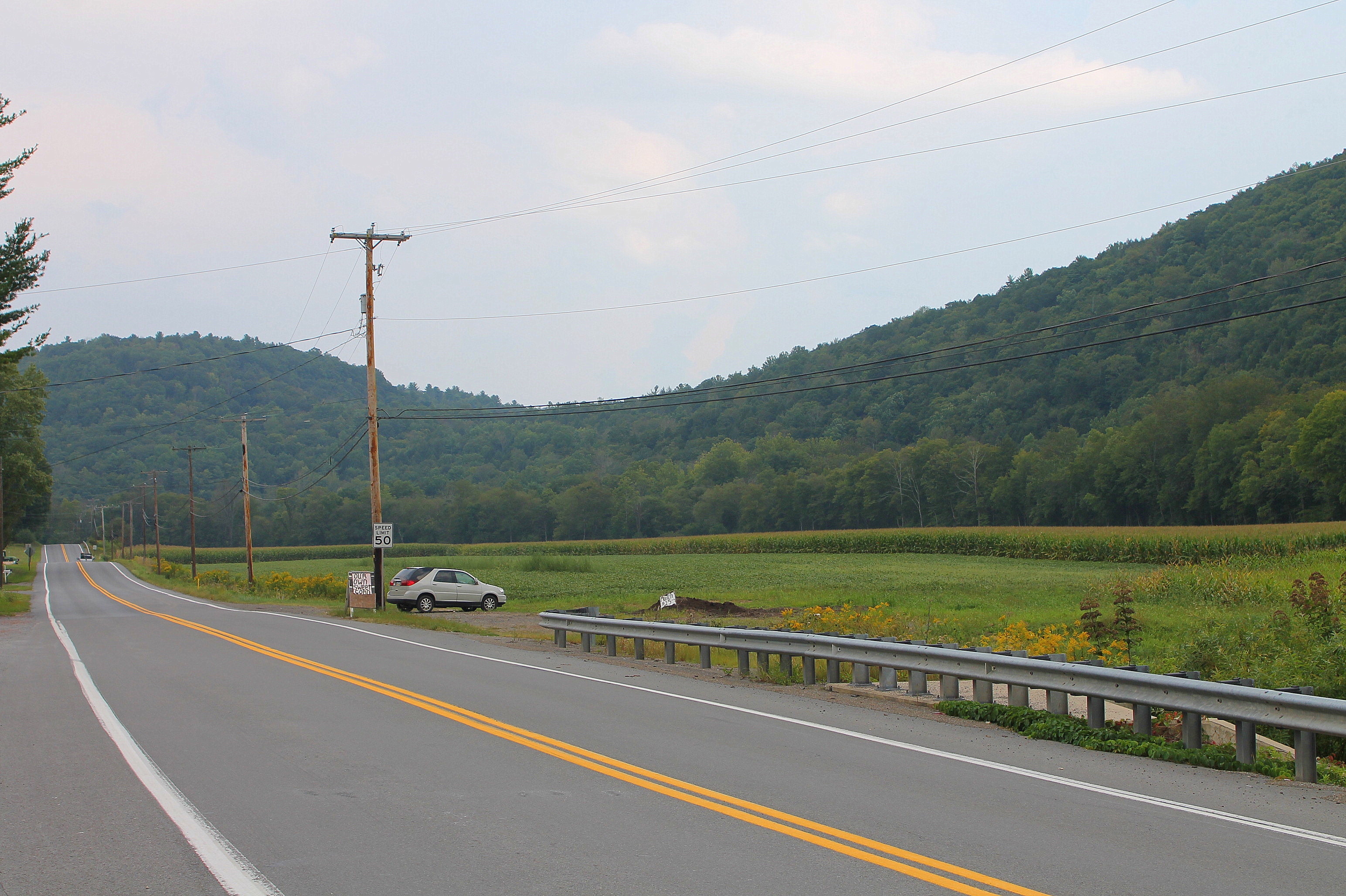
- U.S. Route 220 in Shrewsbury Township

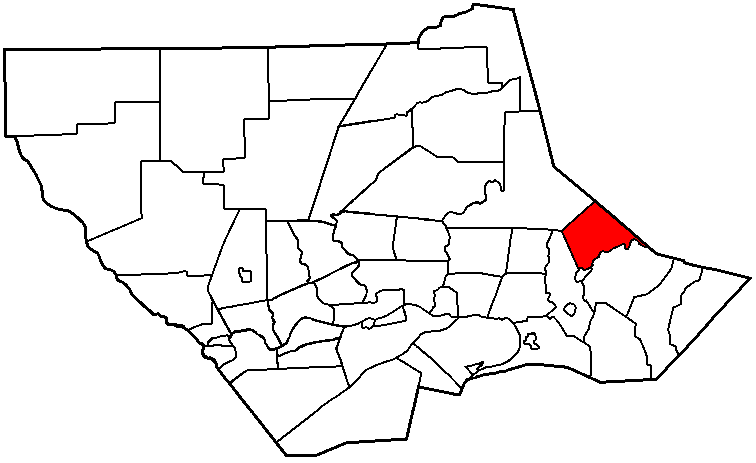
- Map of Lycoming County, Pennsylvania highlighting Shrewsbury Township

- Map of Lycoming County, Pennsylvania
- Coordinates: 41°18′50″N 76°40′37″W
- Country: United States
- State: Pennsylvania
- County: Lycoming
- Settled: 1794
- Incorporated: 1804

Area
  - Total: 18.75 sq mi (48.56 km^{2})
  - Land: 18.66 sq mi (48.32 km^{2})
  - Water: 0.093 sq mi (0.24 km^{2})
- Elevation: 965 ft (294 m)

Population (2020)
  - Total: 419 ▲
  - Estimate (2021): 416
  - Density: 21.7/sq mi (8.38/km^{2})
- Time zone: UTC-5 (Eastern (EST))
  - Summer (DST): UTC-4 (EDT)
- FIPS code: 42-081-70552
- GNIS feature ID: 1216772

Shrewsbury Township is a township in Lycoming County, Pennsylvania, United States. The population was 419 at the 2020 census. It is part of the Williamsport Metropolitan Statistical Area.

== History ==
Shrewsbury Township was formed from part of Muncy Township in 1804. It was originally much larger in size and included a large part of what is now Sullivan County until 1847. It is named for Shrewsbury Township, New Jersey. Some of the first settlers, the Little and Bennett families, migrated to Lycoming County from New Jersey and wanted their new home to have the same name as their old home. Peter Corson, also from New Jersey, was one of the first settlers to establish a home in the area, and he was quite successful. Corson and his wife had five sons and three daughters, and within less than 100 years they had descendants that were numbered by the hundred.

In the late 1800s, Highland Lake, in the northern part of Shrewsbury Township, was a popular summer vacation destination. There were three large hotels on the lake as well as several summer cottages. The cottage holders included Pennsylvanians from as far away as Philadelphia.

Industry and farming are and always have been very limited in Shrewsbury Township, due to its mountainous terrain. The population as of the 2010 census had declined to 409 residents from 570 at the census of 1890.

== Geography ==
Shrewsbury Township is in eastern Lycoming County and is bordered by Sullivan County to the northeast, Penn Township to the southeast, the borough of Picture Rocks to the south, Wolf Township to the west and Plunketts Creek Township to the northwest. The border with Penn Township is formed by Muncy Creek, a southwest-flowing tributary of the West Branch Susquehanna River.

U.S. Route 220 crosses the southeastern part of the township, following the Muncy Creek valley and passing through the two main settlements in the township: Tivoli in the southwest, just north of Picture Rocks, and Glen Mawr in the east. The highway leads southwest 22 miles (35 km) to Williamsport, the Lycoming county seat, and northeast 43 miles (69 km) to Towanda.

According to the United States Census Bureau, the township has a total area of 18.8 square miles (48.6 km^{2}), of which 18.6 square miles (48.3 km^{2}) are land and 0.1 square miles (0.2 km^{2}), or 0.49%, are water.

== Demographics ==
Historical population
Census	Pop.	Note	%±
2010	409		—
2020	419		2.4%
2021 (est.)	416		−0.7%
U.S. Decennial Census

As of the census of 2000, there were 433 people, 181 households, and 131 families residing in the township. The population density was 24.8 people per square mile (9.6/km^{2}). There were 252 housing units at an average density of 14.4/sq mi (5.6/km^{2}). The racial makeup of the township was 99.54% White and 0.46% Native American.

There were 181 households, out of which 23.2% had children under the age of 18 living with them, 65.7% were married couples living together, 3.9% had a female householder with no husband present, and 27.6% were non-families. 24.3% of all households were made up of individuals, and 14.4% had someone living alone who was 65 years of age or older. The average household size was 2.39 and the average family size was 2.83.

In the township the population was spread out, with 20.1% under the age of 18, 5.8% from 18 to 24, 26.8% from 25 to 44, 28.2% from 45 to 64, and 19.2% who were 65 years of age or older. The median age was 43 years. For every 100 females there were 106.2 males. For every 100 females age 18 and over, there were 101.2 males.

The median income for a household in the township was $36,389, and the median income for a family was $45,417. Males had a median income of $30,208 versus $23,750 for females. The per capita income for the township was $17,186. About 3.3% of families and 5.0% of the population were below the poverty line, including none of those under age 18 and 6.4% of those age 65 or over.
