= Mehoopany, Pennsylvania =

- Unincorporated community
- Location within Pennsylvania
- Coordinates: 41°33′48″N 76°03′38″W
- Country: United States
- State: Pennsylvania
- County: Wyoming
- First settled: After 1783
- Elevation: 643 ft (196 m)

Population (2025)
  - Total: 884
- Time zone: UTC-5 (Eastern (EST))
  - Summer (DST): UTC-4 (EDT)
- ZIP code: 18629
- Area codes: 272 & 570
- GNIS feature ID: 1180870

Mehoopany is an unincorporated community in Wyoming County, Pennsylvania, United States. The community is located along Pennsylvania Route 87, 3.6 miles (5.8 km) south of Meshoppen. Mehoopany has a post office with ZIP code 18629.

== History ==
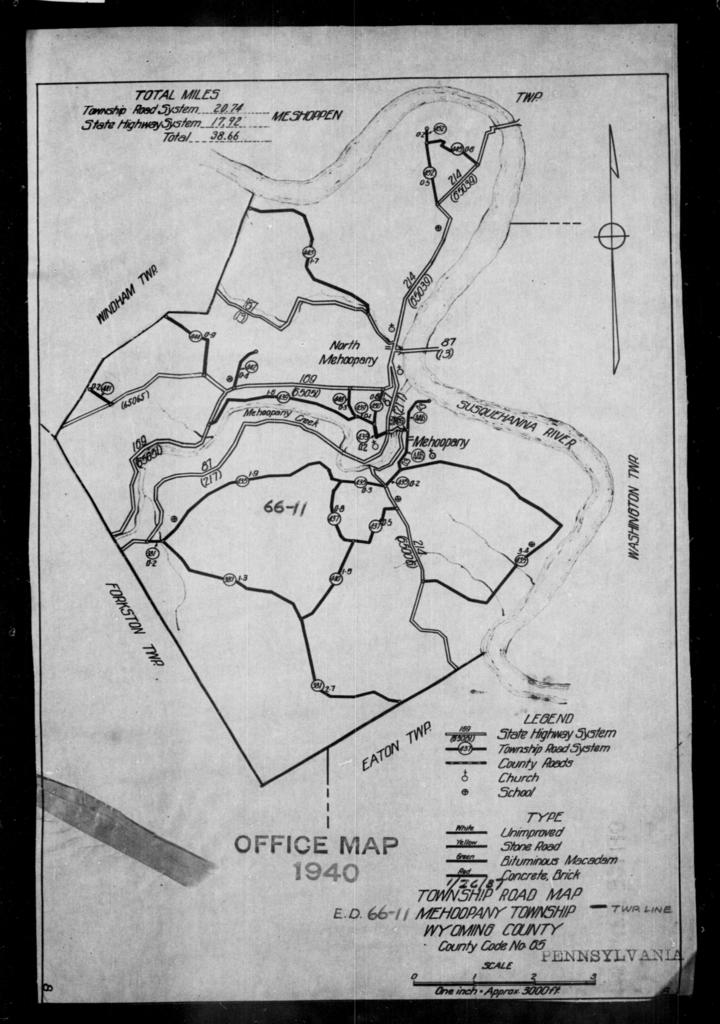
A census map created in 1940 showcasing the area.

The earliest settlements in Mehoopany were located in the "Vaughn's Bend" and "Grist Flat". Vaughn's Bend was first settled by a veteran of the American Revolutionary War named Henry Love shortly after its end. Meanwhile, the Grist Flat was settled later on in an unknown period by a man named Grist.

The first house supported by a frame building was built by a man known as David Jayne in the year 1806.

The town was laid out in 1818.

== Demographics ==
Historical population
Census	Pop.	Note	%±

The United States Census Bureau defined Mehoopany as a census designated place (CDP) in 2023.

The population in 2025 was 884.
