= Wolf Township, Pennsylvania =

Township in Pennsylvania, US

Wolf Township, Lycoming County, Pennsylvania
- Township
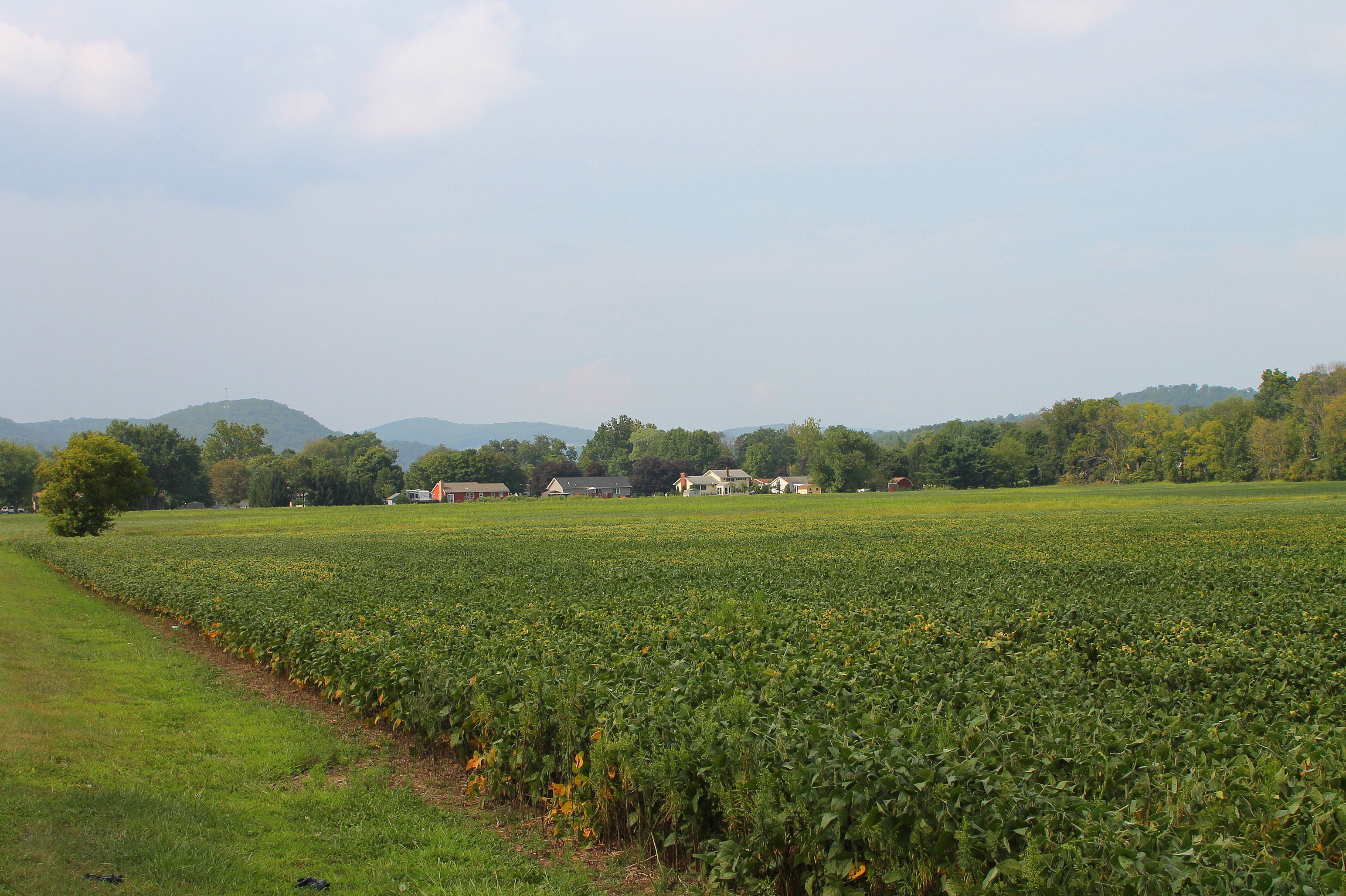
- Field in Wolf Township

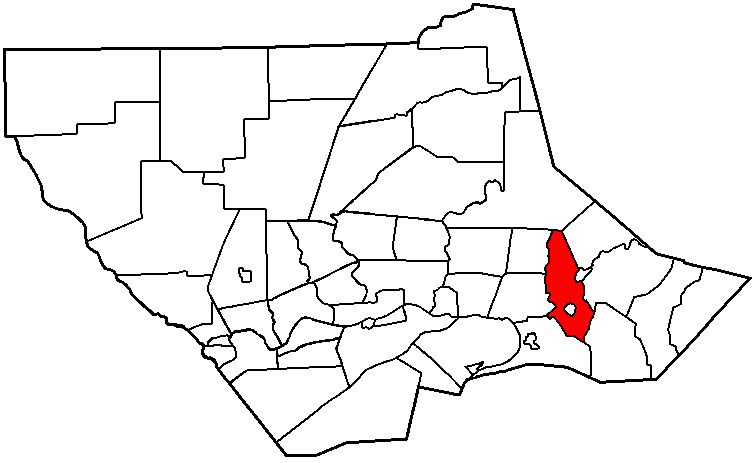
- Map of Lycoming County, Pennsylvania highlighting Wolf Township

- Map of Lycoming County, Pennsylvania
- Coordinates: 41°15′2″N 76°43′4″W
- Country: United States
- State: Pennsylvania
- County: Lycoming
- Settled: 1777
- Incorporated: 1824

Area
  - Total: 19.78 sq mi (51.22 km^{2})
  - Land: 19.63 sq mi (50.84 km^{2})
  - Water: 0.15 sq mi (0.38 km^{2})
- Elevation: 560 ft (170 m)

Population (2020)
  - Total: 3,109 ▲
  - Estimate (2021): 3,090
  - Density: 153.2/sq mi (59.15/km^{2})
- Time zone: UTC-5 (Eastern (EST))
  - Summer (DST): UTC-4 (EDT)
- FIPS code: 42-081-85984
- GNIS feature ID: 1216777
- Website: wolftownship.org

Wolf Township is a township in Lycoming County, Pennsylvania, United States. The population was 3,109 at the 2020 census. It is part of the Williamsport Metropolitan Statistical Area.

== History ==
Wolf Township was formed from part of Muncy Township by the Court of Quarter Sessions of the Peace of Lycoming County in 1834. The township is named for George Wolf, governor of Pennsylvania from 1829 to 1835. The boroughs of Hughesville and Picture Rocks are on land that was taken from Wolf Township.

Wolf Township has grown to a population of 2,907 residents as of the 2010 census, up from 734 residents at the census of 1890.

=== Quarries ===
The geology of Wolf Township played a role in its history. Limestone was quarried west of Hughesville for use as lime, used in large quantities as building and engineering materials (including limestone products, concrete and mortar) and as chemical feedstocks, among other uses. Wolf Township was also the home to several Pennsylvania bluestone quarries. Pennsylvania bluestone has many uses, from cut dimensional stone used in patios, walkways and stair treads to architectural stone used in buildings. It is also used for wallstone, decorative boulders, natural steps and other landscape features.

=== Early settlers and industry ===
David Aspen was the first white settler to live within the borders of what is now Wolf Township. He was scalped during the Revolutionary War, when his and other settlements throughout the Susquehanna valley were attacked by Loyalists and Native Americans allied with the British. After the Wyoming Valley battle and massacre in the summer of 1778 (near what is now Wilkes-Barre) and smaller local attacks, the "Big Runaway" occurred throughout the West Branch Susquehanna Valley. Settlers fled feared and actual attacks by the British and their allies. Homes and fields were abandoned, with livestock driven along and a few possessions floated on rafts on the river east to Muncy, then further south to Sunbury. The abandoned property was burnt by the attackers. Some settlers soon returned, only to flee again in the summer of 1779 in the "Little Runaway". Sullivan's Expedition helped stabilize the area and encouraged resettlement, which continued after the war. Abraham Webster was another of the early settlers to be attacked, only he survived and returned to Wolf Township twelve years after the Big Runaway. His entire family had been killed, but he returned with a new wife and re-established his home.

The earliest industrial venture in Wolf Township was a gristmill constructed in 1816. A wool carding mill was built in 1842. There were also several sawmills in the township that were part of the lumber industry that covered much of Pennsylvania during the late 1800s.

== Geography ==
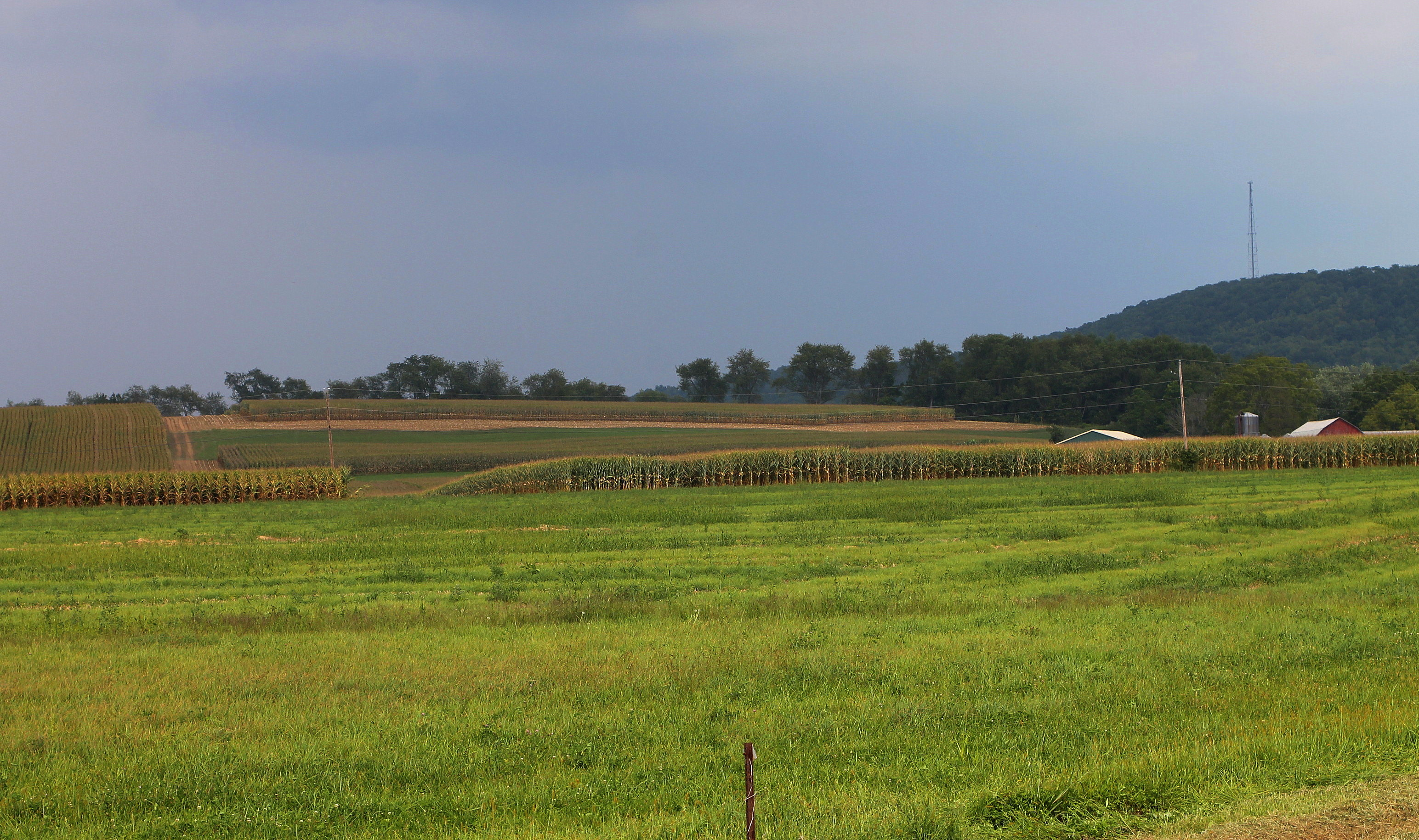
Field in Wolf Township

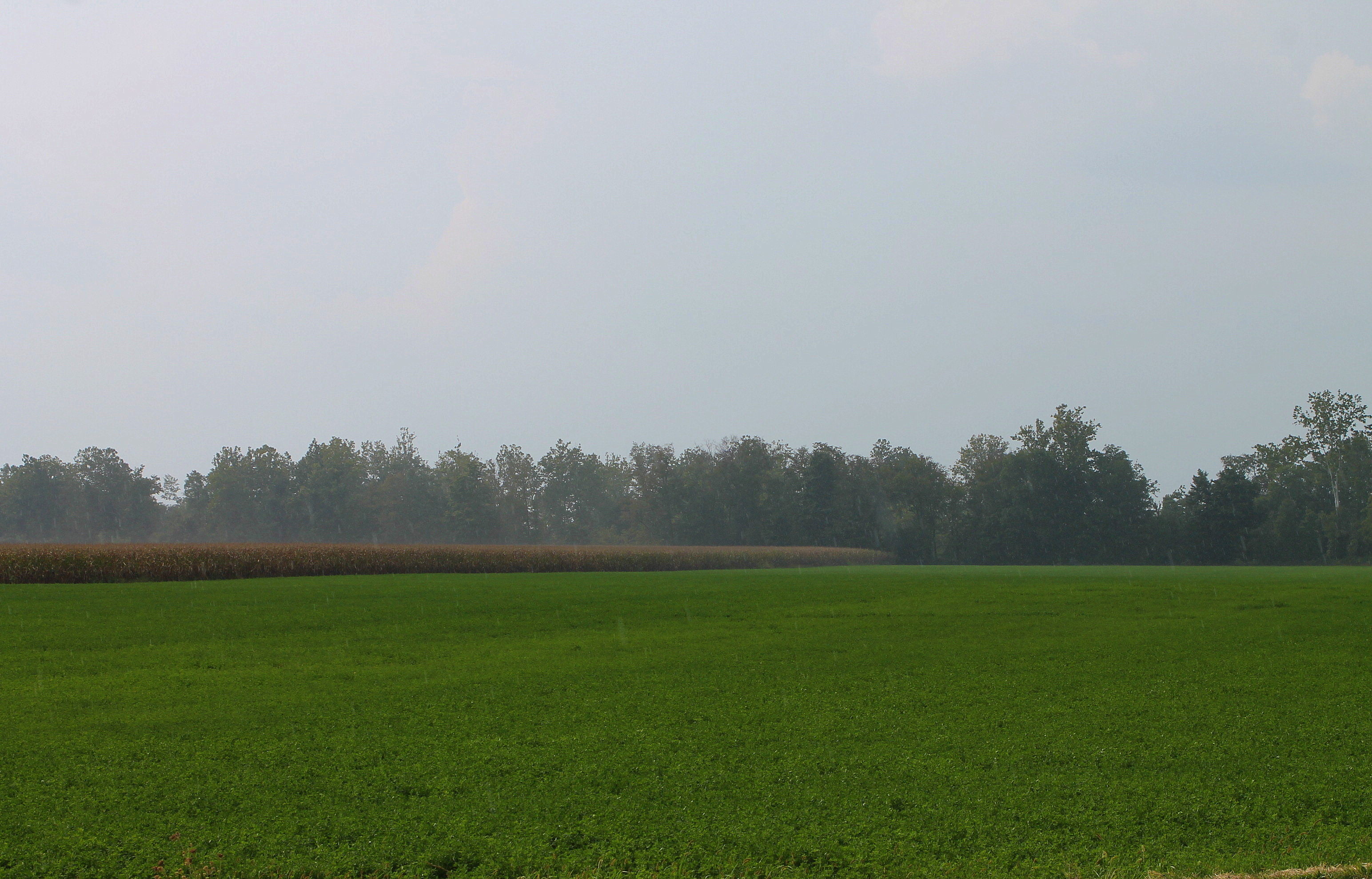
Field in Wolf Township

Wolf Township is in southeastern Lycoming County and is bordered by Plunketts Creek Township to the north, Shrewsbury Township to the northeast, the borough of Picture Rocks and Penn Township to the east, Moreland Township to the southeast, Muncy Creek Township to the southwest, Muncy Township to the west, and Mill Creek Township to the northwest. Wolf Township surrounds the borough of Hughesville. Wolf Township is 15 miles (24 km) east of Williamsport, the Lycoming county seat, and 84 miles (135 km) north of Harrisburg, the state capital. It is 50 miles (80 km) west of Wilkes-Barre.

According to the United States Census Bureau, the township has a total area of 19.8 square miles (51.2 km^{2}), of which 19.6 square miles (50.8 km^{2}) are land and 0.2 square miles (0.4 km^{2}), or 0.75%, are water. Muncy Creek, a tributary of the West Branch Susquehanna River, flows through the township from northeast to southwest.

== Demographics ==
Historical population
Census	Pop.	Note	%±
2010	2,907		—
2020	3,109		6.9%
2021 (est.)	3,090		−0.6%
U.S. Decennial Census

As of the census of 2000, there were 2,707 people, 1,050 households, and 787 families residing in the township. The population density was 138.3 inhabitants per square mile (53.4/km^{2}). There were 1,102 housing units at an average density of 56.3 per square mile (21.7/km^{2}). The racial makeup of the township was 99.19% White, 0.22% African American, 0.07% Native American, 0.15% Asian, and 0.37% from two or more races. Hispanic or Latino of any race were 0.15% of the population.

There were 1,050 households, out of which 32.9% had children under the age of 18 living with them, 62.1% were married couples living together, 9.1% had a female householder with no husband present, and 25.0% were non-families. 21.0% of all households were made up of individuals, and 10.0% had someone living alone who was 65 years of age or older. The average household size was 2.58 and the average family size was 2.97.

In the township the population was spread out, with 25.3% under the age of 18, 7.5% from 18 to 24, 27.6% from 25 to 44, 26.7% from 45 to 64, and 12.9% who were 65 years of age or older. The median age was 39 years. For every 100 females there were 97.6 males. For every 100 females age 18 and over, there were 91.9 males.

The median income for a household in the township was $39,167, and the median income for a family was $45,859. Males had a median income of $31,284 versus $22,852 for females. The per capita income for the township was $18,571. About 5.8% of families and 8.5% of the population were below the poverty line, including 10.8% of those under age 18 and 11.8% of those age 65 or over.
