= Picture Rocks, Pennsylvania =

Borough in Pennsylvania, US

- Borough
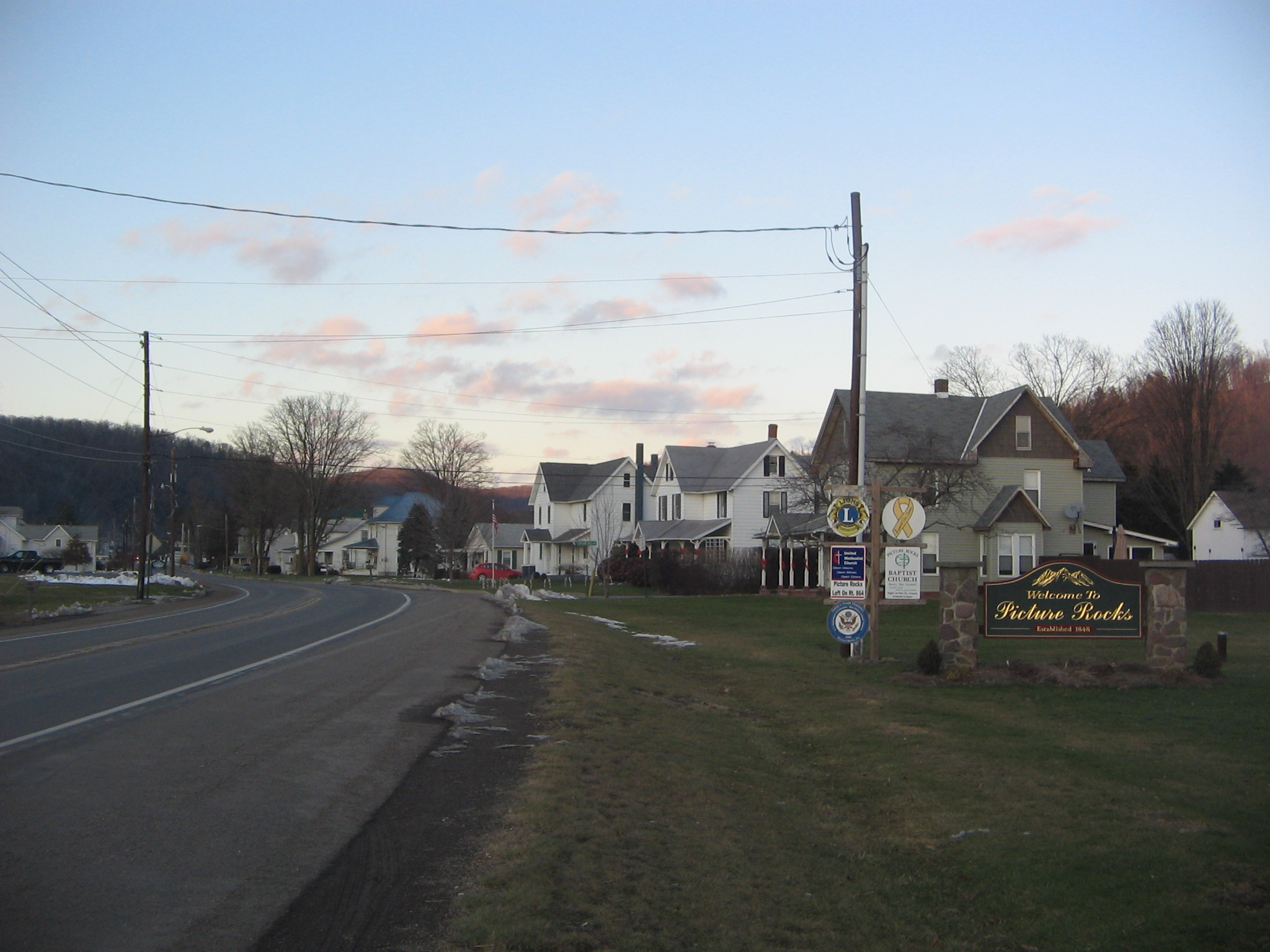
- Heading north on US Route 220 into Picture Rocks

- Location of Picture Rocks in Lycoming County, Pennsylvania.

- Map of Pennsylvania highlighting Lycoming County
- Coordinates: 41°16′48″N 76°42′42″W
- Country: United States
- State: Pennsylvania
- County: Lycoming
- Settled: 1848
- Incorporated: 1875

Area
  - Total: 1.00 sq mi (2.59 km^{2})
  - Land: 0.97 sq mi (2.52 km^{2})
  - Water: 0.027 sq mi (0.07 km^{2})
- Elevation: 646 ft (197 m)

Population (2020)
  - Total: 643
  - Density: 659.9/sq mi (254.77/km^{2})
- Time zone: UTC-5 (Eastern (EST))
  - Summer (DST): UTC-4 (EDT)
- ZIP code: 17762
- Area code: 570
- FIPS code: 42-60136
- GNIS feature ID: 1193116
- Website: https://picturerocksborough.com

Picture Rocks is a borough in Lycoming County, Pennsylvania, United States. The 2020 census measured the population at 640. It is part of the Williamsport, Pennsylvania Metropolitan Statistical Area.

== Notable person ==
Picture Rocks is the birthplace of Warren Sprout, who won a shooting gold medal at the 1912 Olympics.

== History ==
Picture Rocks was incorporated as a borough on September 27, 1875 from land formerly included in Wolf Township. However, its recorded history began a century earlier. The earliest settlers arrived in 1773 and observed Indian pictographs (no longer extant) in the Muncy Creek valley. The borough occupies the site of a Munsee Indian village, evidenced by arrowheads and other relics found in the vicinity of the creek.

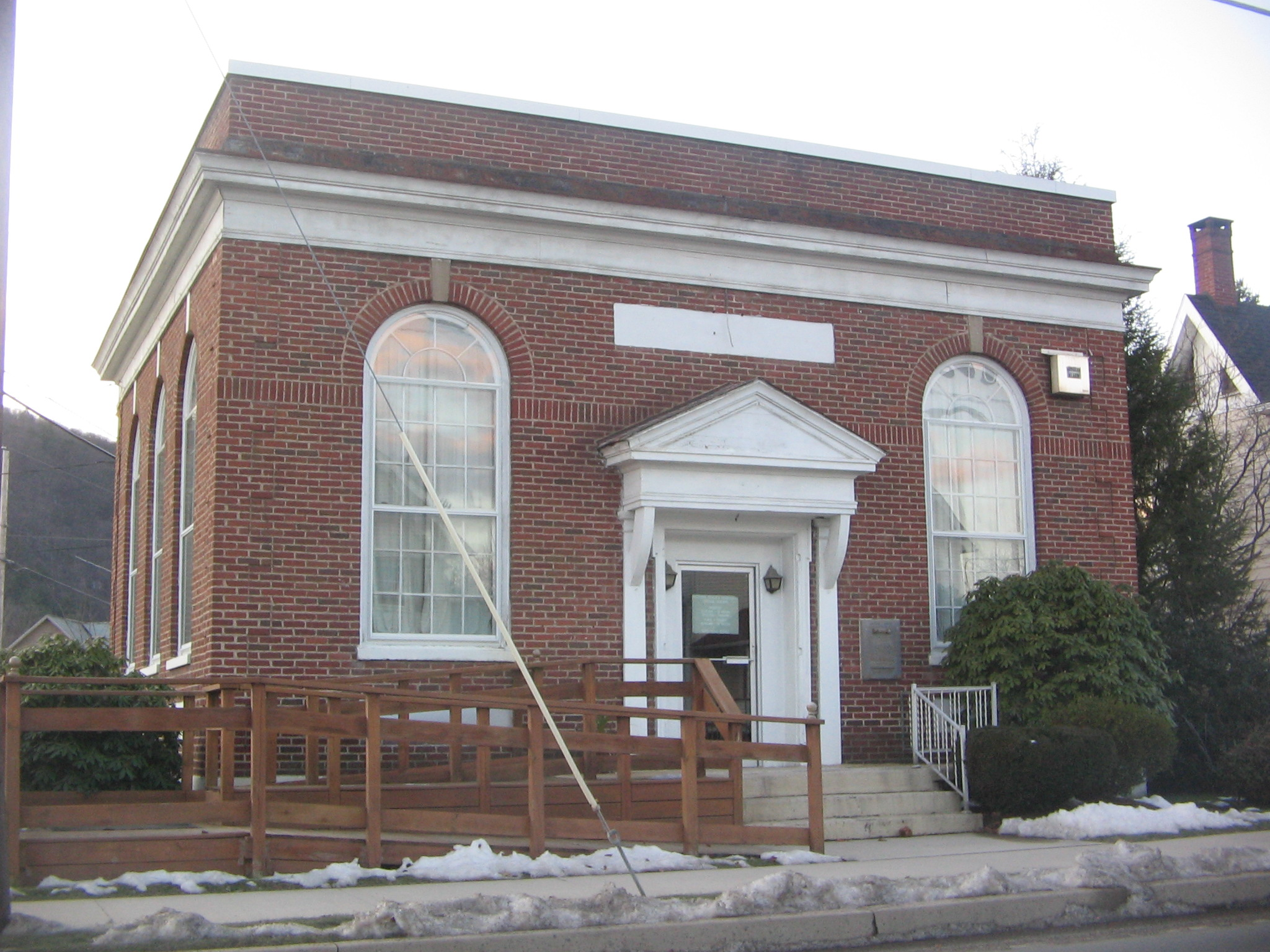
The borough hall in Picture Rocks

The Province of Pennsylvania issued the first warrant for property in the Picture Rocks area to Henry Rody on June 3, 1773. The land remained largely undeveloped passing through several hands until it was sold in 1848 to A. R. Sprout and Amos Burrows. The two founded Picture Rocks. Sprout and Burrows cleared the land of the rocks, logs and brush. They also rebuilt an abandoned sawmill and established a factory that manufactured sashes, doors, and window blinds. This factory, the first of its kind in the area, caused a stir among local carpenters who believed that the ready made building materials would curtail their craft. The factory was later used by the Burrows Brothers Furniture Company before becoming the Handle and Excelsior Company. Another factory, located at the present intersection of U.S. Route 220 and Factory Street, manufactured ladders. Picture Rocks continues as a wood processing center.

The town grew as other manufacturers arrived to harness water power provided by Muncy Creek. The prohibitionist organizers of the town required persons purchasing lots in Picture Rocks to sign an agreement stating that they would not open a saloon or engage in the trafficking of liquor. The borough remains a dry municipality.

The Baptists of Picture Rocks organized an 1840 meeting at the school house. A traveling minister arrived in Picture Rocks one Saturday evening and found the school to be unfit for Sunday gatherings. After preaching the following morning, he rallied the members of the congregation to the cause of building a proper house of worship. Under the guidance of their new pastor, the members of the Baptist Church built a log church. Twenty-five years later the congregation replaced it with a larger facility.

At the time of the borough's creation, Center Street was the primary thoroughfare. The stately homes built by the Burrows and Sprout families remained along Center Street and were identified by their square shape with low pitched roofs some with a widow's watch.

Borough resident John Wesley Little achieved international fame for his watercolor landscapes and images of rural farms and animals. His former studio and home is located along Water Street. His paintings remain highly sought after in the regional market.

The borough boasts two churches, a Baptist Church on Elm Street and a United Methodist Church on Laurel Street.

Located within the East Lycoming School District, Picture Rocks is home to George A. Ferrell Elementary School. This K-6 elementary school is recognized as a National Blue Ribbon School. The school was originally a fully inclusive school for students in first through twelfth grades with its own sports program. In 1946 the school joined with others in neighboring Hughesville and nearby Lairdsville to form the East Lycoming School District.

== Geography ==
Picture Rocks is located at 41°16′48″N 76°42′42″W (41.280066, -76.711731), in southeastern Lycoming County. It is bordered by Wolf Township to the west, Shrewsbury Township to the north and Penn Township to the east and south. As the crow flies, Lycoming County is approximately 130 miles (209 km) northwest of Philadelphia and 165 miles (266 km) east-northeast of Pittsburgh.

According to the United States Census Bureau, the borough has a total area of 0.9 square mile (2.4 km^{2}), all land.

== Demographics ==
Historical population
Census	Pop.	Note	%±
1880	321		—
1890	510		58.9%
1900	614		20.4%
1910	576		−6.2%
1920	526		−8.7%
1930	548		4.2%
1940	537		−2.0%
1950	569		6.0%
1960	594		4.4%
1970	570		−4.0%
1980	615		7.9%
1990	660		7.3%
2000	693		5.0%
2010	678		−2.2%
2020	643		−5.2%
2021 (est.)	636	▼	−1.1%

As of the census of 2000, there were 693 people, 274 households, and 198 families residing in the borough. The population density was 740.3 inhabitants per square mile (285.8/km^{2}). There were 288 housing units at an average density of 307.7 per square mile (118.8/km^{2}). The racial makeup of the borough was 98.41% White, 0.29% Native American, 0.43% Asian, and 0.87% from two or more races.

There were 274 households, out of which 35.4% had children under the age of 18 living with them, 60.2% were married couples living together, 9.5% had a female householder with no husband present, and 27.4% were non-families. 24.1% of all households were made up of individuals, and 13.9% had someone living alone who was 65 years of age or older. The average household size was 2.53 and the average family size was 2.99.

In the borough the population was spread out, with 25.4% under the age of 18, 6.3% from 18 to 24, 31.5% from 25 to 44, 23.7% from 45 to 64, and 13.1% who were 65 years of age or older. The median age was 37 years. For every 100 females there were 94.7 males. For every 100 females age 18 and over, there were 88.7 males.

The median income for a household in the borough was $36,375, and the median income for a family was $45,568. Males had a median income of $31,103 versus $21,667 for females. The per capita income for the borough was $15,402. About 8.5% of families and 11.4% of the population were below the poverty line, including 16.7% of those under age 18 and 12.0% of those age 65 or over.

== See also ==
- History of Lycoming County, Pennsylvania
