= Montoursville, Pennsylvania =

Borough in Pennsylvania, US

- Borough
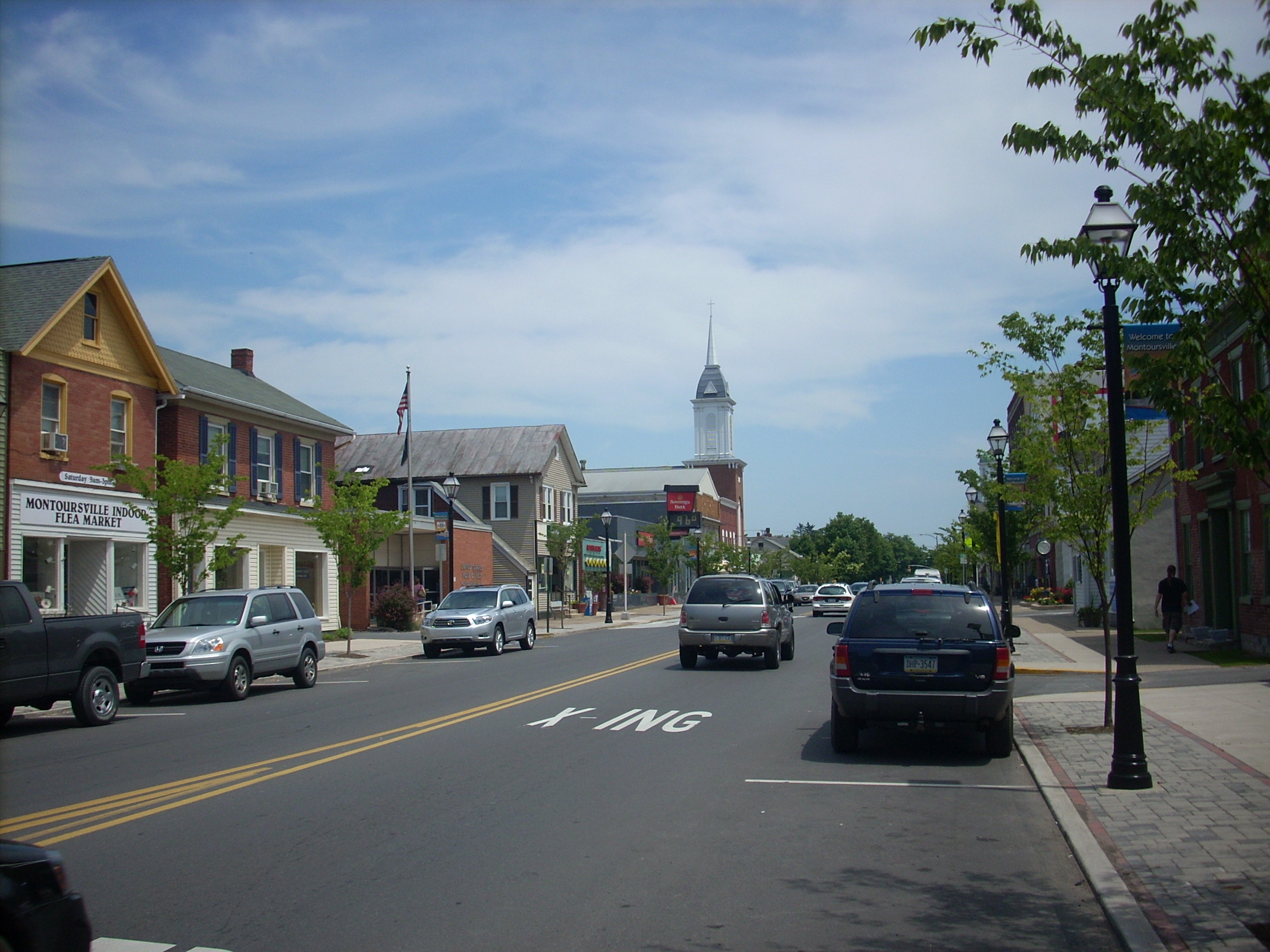
- Broad Street in Montoursville

- Location of Montoursville in Lycoming County, Pennsylvania

- Location of Lycoming County within Pennsylvania
- Coordinates: 41°15′10″N 76°54′56″W
- Country: United States
- State: Pennsylvania
- County: Lycoming
- Settled: 1820
- Incorporated (borough): 1850

Government
  - Mayor: Steve Bagwell

Area
  - Total: 4.18 sq mi (10.83 km^{2})
  - Land: 3.63 sq mi (9.41 km^{2})
  - Water: 0.55 sq mi (1.42 km^{2}) 3.12%
- Elevation (center of borough): 540 ft (160 m)
- Highest elevation (northeast boundary of borough): 660 ft (200 m)
- Lowest elevation (West Branch Susquehanna River): 496 ft (151 m)

Population (2020)
  - Total: 4,750
  - Density: 1,307.5/sq mi (504.82/km^{2})
- Time zone: UTC−5 (Eastern Time Zone (North America))
  - Summer (DST): UTC−4 (EDT)
- ZIP Code: 17754
- Area code: 570
- FIPS code: 42-50720
- GNIS feature ID: 1213650
- Website: www.montoursvilleborough.org

Montoursville is a borough in Lycoming County, Pennsylvania. The 2020 census reported its population as 4,745. It forms part of the Williamsport, Pennsylvania Metropolitan Statistical Area. The Williamsport Regional Airport is in Montoursville.

Developed on the east bank of Loyalsock Creek near the former native village of Otstonwakin, the borough is named for Andrew Montour, the French/Native American and son of Madame Montour, a Native American interpreter and negotiator who served the British colonial government in New York and Pennsylvania during the early eighteenth century. She led the native village. Her son also became influential as an interpreter and negotiator, serving colonial governments in Pennsylvania and Virginia, including during the French and Indian War.

== History ==
Otstawonkin was a native village located at the mouth of Loyalsock Creek on the West Branch Susquehanna River. The Great Shamokin Path ran along the west bank of the river, where late 20th century archeology has shown the village was mostly located. During the 1730s and 1740s, it became an important stopping point for Moravian missionaries who preached in frontier Pennsylvania. For example, Count Zinzendorf, a missionary guided by Conrad Weiser with the permission of Oneida chief Shikellamy, came to Otstonwakin in 1742.

Madame Montour is believed to have been of Algonkin-French ancestry, born in Quebec. In one account, she told a colonist in the 1740s that she had been taken captive in an Iroquois raid and adopted into an Iroquois family. (Her given name may have been Catherine, Elisabeth/Isabelle, or Madeleine.) Speaking French and English, as well as Algonquian and Iroquoian languages, she became highly influential in New York, and acted as Governor Robert Hunter's personal interpreter.

She and her Oneida husband Carondawana settled in Pennsylvania by 1727, moving south from New York; he had been appointed by the Shawnee in this part of Pennsylvania as their representative to the provincial council. A war chief, Carondawana was killed in 1729 in a southern raid against the Catawba people. Madame Montour continued to have influence as a friend of the British, representing the Iroquois and other native peoples of the area. She was hospitable to the white men who were beginning to migrate into the West Branch Susquehanna River Valley. She had a great amount of influence with the various Indian tribes in the area, who were feeling the pressure of colonial expansion.

Believed to have been born in Trois-Rivières, Quebec, Madame Montour grew up in the province of New York, where she served as an interpreter to the British. Because of her numerous native ties, she was very influential. The British colonial government was known to be sometimes laggardly in paying her for her services, making her wait one time a year for payment.

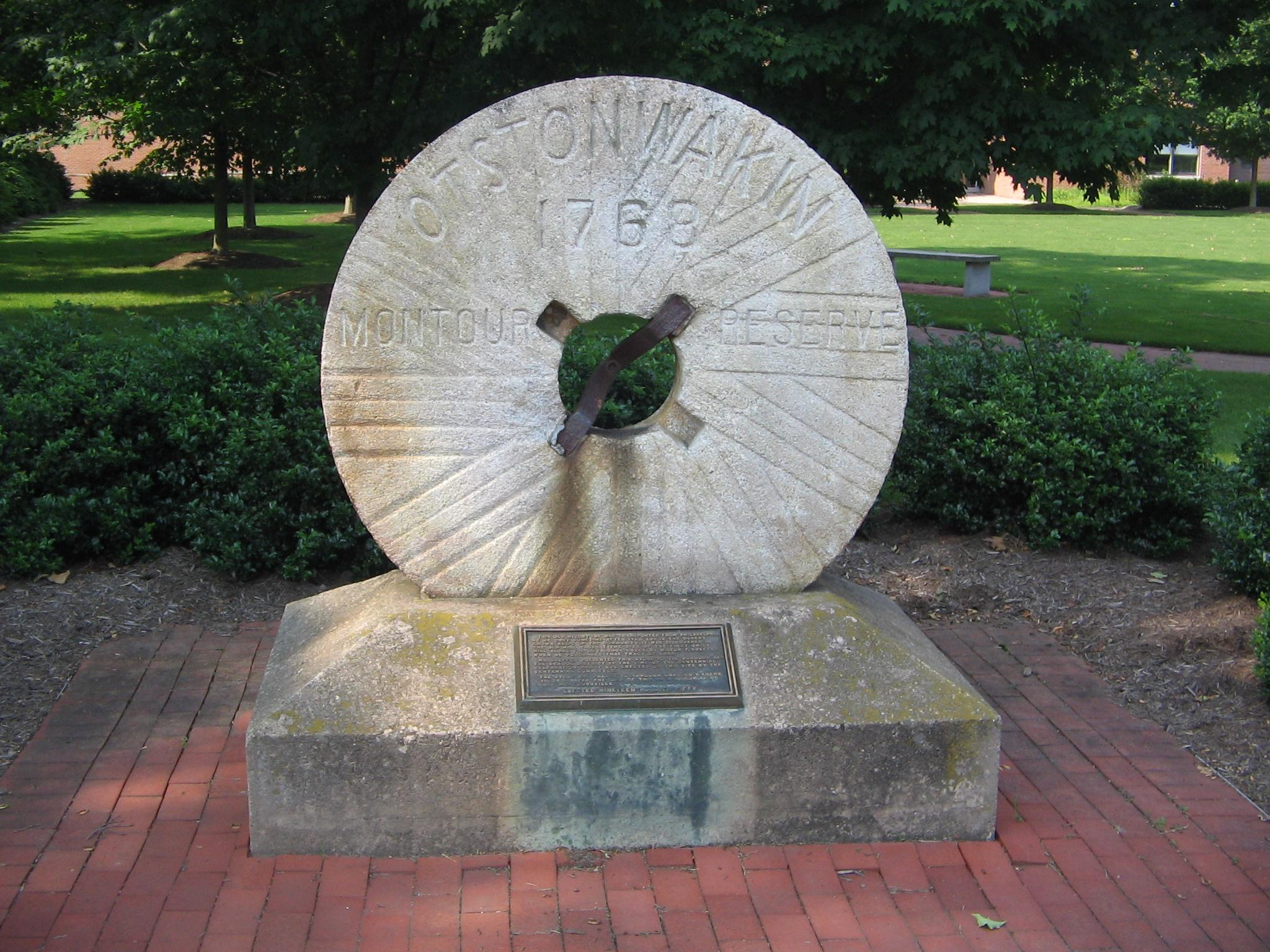
Millstone from early native settlement, engraved "Otstonwakin, 1768, Montour Preserve"

Madame Montour is believed to have had three children, but different kinship terms has caused confusion among historians as to the status of some. Louis (Lewis), may have been a son or nephew, named for her brother, Louis Couc Montour. He served as an interpreter during the French and Indian War, when he was killed. Her daughter (or niece), Margaret, later to be known as "French Margaret," became a leader of "French Margaret's Town" at the mouth of Lycoming Creek, a few miles up the West Branch Susquehanna River from Montoursville.

Her surviving son Andrew, took over leadership of Otstonwakin in the 1740s. Growing up in a polyglot world, he displayed his mother's gift for languages, speaking French, English, Lenape, Shawnee and the Iroquoian languages. Comfortable with both Native Americans and Europeans, he made a good living as an interpreter for local tribes and settlers. In 1742 when Count Zinzendorf met Montour, he described him as looking "decidedly European, and had his face not been encircled with a broad band of paint we would have thought he was one."

Montour also served as an interpreter with Conrad Weiser and Chief Shikellamy. He was granted 880 acres (3.6 km^{2}) of land by the Province of Pennsylvania in the Montoursville area. He later was appointed as a captain in George Washington's Army at Fort Necessity during the French and Indian War. Andrew Montour left Montoursville at some point and moved to Juniata County with his mother before finally settling on Mountour's Island in the Allegheny River near Pittsburgh. She died in that area in 1753.

=== Federal period and later ===
Permanent European-American settlement of this site did not take place until after the American Revolutionary War. John Burrows gained credit as the founder of Montoursville because he sold lots to other settlers, as well as achieving political power and wealth. He was born near Rahway, New Jersey. In his youth Burrows carried mail by horseback between New York and Philadelphia. He also served as a courier for General George Washington during the American Revolution for fourteen months. Following the war, Burrows migrated to Muncy, Pennsylvania and worked in the distilling business for several years.

He built up capital to make an invest in land near the mouth of Loyalsock Creek, which was developed as Montoursville. He bought 570 acres (2.3 km^{2}) in 1812. Burrows divided his land into lots in 1820 and sold them for $50.00 each. In Lycoming County government, Burrows served as a justice of the peace before being elected county commissioner in 1802, and to the Pennsylvania State Senate in 1808.

The first buyers of lots in Montoursville settled according to ethnicity. The Germans settled in the eastern end in a neighborhood called Coffeetown, while the English settled in a western neighborhood known as Teatown. In addition to selling the lots in Montoursville, Burrows operated a highly successful farm. He sent his produce by raft down the Susquehanna River to Baltimore, where he was able to turn a profit. Burrows built the first gristmill in the town. He continued to sell lots up until his death in 1837.

His son Nathaniel Burrows was also a businessman. He opened the first general store in the town. He received the contract for construction of the West Branch Canal in this section of Lycoming County. Nathaniel Burrows influenced the routing of the canal so that it ran closer to the town and his businesses. Montoursville was incorporated as a borough on February 19, 1850.

John Else came as a child with his family to the Montoursville area in 1807 from Bucks County, Pennsylvania. His family farmed along Mill Creek in what is now Mill Creek Township. As a young man, John Else worked to build the first permanent bridge over Loyalsock Creek in 1815. He made numerous improvements in the community. Else built many structures in Montoursville, working with his father on the first permanent house.

=== Indian Park ===
Indian Park is located on the north-western side of Montoursville; Interstate 180/U.S. Route 220 run parallel to it. In the 21st century, the large recreational park has several miles of hiking and biking trails, numerous softball fields, picnic areas and pavilions, and fishing ponds.

Indian Park was a developed as an amusement park in the late 19th century. Known as a trolley park, it could be reached by public transportation. Visitors from Williamsport would board the trolley in downtown and ride to Indian Park to spend a day of recreation along the banks of Loyalsock Creek. The park had one of the largest and longest roller coasters on the East Coast. The park also featured more than 20 acres (81,000 m^{2}) of ponds, a theater, and a merry-go-round. The amusement park was closed in 1924 due in large part to the seasonal costs of reconstruction of infrastructure following the annual floods on Loyalsock Creek. In addition, people's increasing use of automobiles meant they traveled to other destinations for pleasure.

=== TWA Flight 800 ===
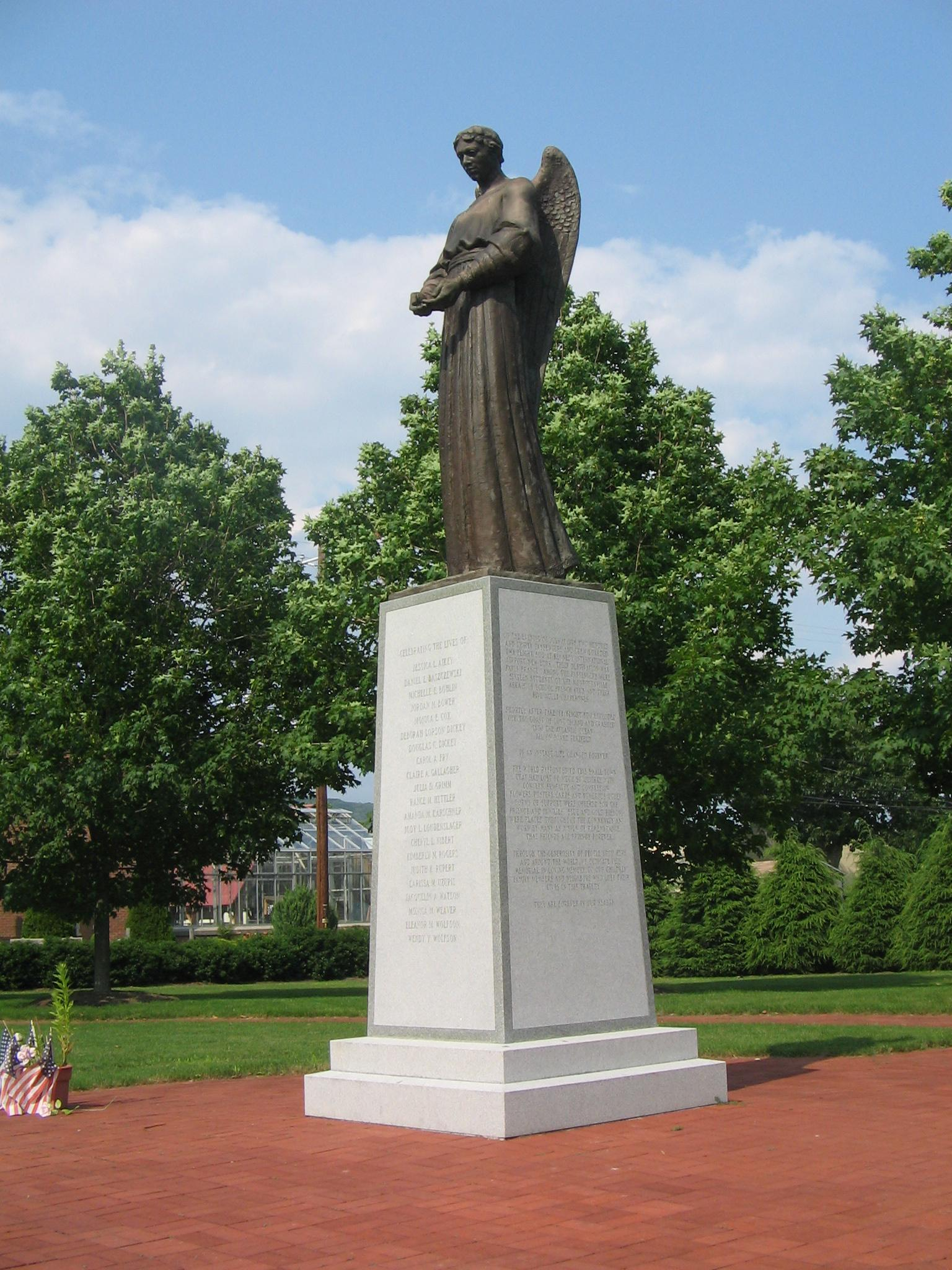
The TWA Flight 800 memorial

Montoursville was disproportionately affected by the explosion of TWA Flight 800 on July 17, 1996, off East Moriches, New York, as 21 of the 230 passengers were Montoursville-area residents. The sixteen Montoursville High School students and their five chaperones were on a school-sponsored trip to France as part of a student exchange program.

Montoursville received condolences from around the world, including Japan, Australia, and Belgium. Governor Tom Ridge attended a vigil at the school with his wife. Ridge also attended a memorial service, which was also attended by New York City mayor Rudy Giuliani and Pennsylvania senator Rick Santorum. Condolences were also sent by President Bill Clinton, the U.S. softball team at the Atlanta Olympics, and François Bujon de l'Estang, French ambassador to the United States (1995–2002).

A memorial was erected on the grounds of Montoursville High School composed of a statue of an angel sculpted by James Barnhill of Asheville, North Carolina on a base engraved with the names of the 21 local victims and a brief recounting of events. The memorial stands in a circular grove of 21 trees, one for each person lost. The angel was chosen because onlookers thought a cloud seen above the high school on July 21, 1996, resembled an angel, with 21 small clouds at its feet. Randolph Hudson of State College was chosen as the memorial designer and Beth Hershberger served as landscape designer.

The five chaperones were Debbie Dickey, a French teacher of the Montoursville Area High School; Doug Dickey, her husband; Carol Fry, former school board member; Judith Rupert, high school secretary; and Eleanor Wolfson (mother of student Wendy Wolfson).

The 16 students were Jessica Aikey, Daniel Baszczewski, Michelle Bohlin, Jordan Bower, Monica Cox, Claire Gallagher, Julia Grimm, Rance Hettler, Amanda Karschner, Jody Loudenslager, Cheryl Nibert, Kimberly Rogers, Larissa Uzupis, Jacqueline Watson, Monica Weaver, and Wendy Wolfson.

== Geography ==
Montoursville is bounded by the West Branch Susquehanna River and Armstrong Township to the south. Loyalsock Creek forms the northern and western border with Loyalsock Township. Fairfield Township borders the borough to the north and east. As the crow flies, Lycoming County is about 130 miles (209 km) northwest of Philadelphia and 165 miles (266 km) east-northeast of Pittsburgh.

Montoursville is located at 41°15′10″N 76°54′56″W (41.252729, -76.915507). According to the U.S. Census Bureau, the borough has a total area of 4.2 square miles (10.8 km^{2}), of which 4.0 square miles (10.5 km^{2}) is land and 0.1 square mile (0.3 km^{2}) 3.12% is water.

== Demographics ==
Historical population
Census	Pop.	Note	%±
1850	228		—
1860	369		61.8%
1870	1,048		184.0%
1880	1,193		13.8%
1890	1,278		7.1%
1900	1,665		30.3%
1910	1,904		14.4%
1920	1,949		2.4%
1930	2,710		39.0%
1940	3,019		11.4%
1950	3,293		9.1%
1960	5,211		58.2%
1970	5,985		14.9%
1980	5,403		−9.7%
1990	4,983		−7.8%
2000	4,777		−4.1%
2010	4,615		−3.4%
2020	4,750		2.9%
2021 (est.)	4,715	▼	−0.7%

=== 2020 census ===
As of the 2020 census, Montoursville had a population of 4,750. The median age was 43.8 years. 21.5% of residents were under the age of 18 and 22.7% of residents were 65 years of age or older. For every 100 females there were 92.6 males, and for every 100 females age 18 and over there were 88.3 males age 18 and over.

100.0% of residents lived in urban areas, while 0.0% lived in rural areas.

There were 2,115 households in Montoursville, of which 26.0% had children under the age of 18 living in them. Of all households, 43.9% were married-couple households, 18.3% were households with a male householder and no spouse or partner present, and 30.1% were households with a female householder and no spouse or partner present. About 32.7% of all households were made up of individuals and 17.7% had someone living alone who was 65 years of age or older.

There were 2,238 housing units, of which 5.5% were vacant. The homeowner vacancy rate was 0.8% and the rental vacancy rate was 4.8%.

Racial composition as of the 2020 census
Race	Number	Percent
White	4,437	93.4%
Black or African American	29	0.6%
American Indian and Alaska Native	7	0.1%
Asian	45	0.9%
Native Hawaiian and Other Pacific Islander	2	0.0%
Some other race	32	0.7%
Two or more races	198	4.2%
Hispanic or Latino (of any race)	78	1.6%

=== 2000 census ===
As of the census of 2000, there were 4,777 people, 2,067 households, and 1,393 families residing in the borough. The population density was 1,181.0 inhabitants per square mile (456.0/km^{2}). There were 2,169 housing units at an average density of 536.3 per square mile (207.1/km^{2}). The racial makeup of the borough was 99.02% White, 0.10% African American, 0.06% Native American, 0.33% Asian, 0.06% from other races, and 0.42% from two or more races. Hispanic or Latino of any race were 0.42% of the population.

There were 2,067 households, out of which 28.0% had children under the age of 18 living with them, 53.6% were married couples living together, 10.4% had a female householder with no husband present, and 32.6% were non-families. 29.0% of all households were made up of individuals, and 14.7% had someone living alone who was 65 years of age or older. The average household size was 2.31 and the average family size was 2.84.

In the borough the population was spread out, with 23.4% under the age of 18, 5.2% from 18 to 24, 26.1% from 25 to 44, 22.6% from 45 to 64, and 22.7% who were 65 years of age or older. The median age was 42 years. For every 100 females, there were 90.5 males. For every 100 females age 18 and over, there were 85.4 males.

The median income for a household in the borough was $37,484, and the median income for a family was $44,583. Males had a median income of $33,750 versus $24,449 for females. The per capita income for the borough was $19,648. About 2.4% of families and 4.2% of the population were below the poverty line, including 2.4% of those under age 18 and 5.1% of those age 65 or over.

== Education ==
Montoursville Area School District consists of:

- Loyalsock Valley Elementary School
- Lyter Elementary School
- C.E. McCall Middle School
- Montoursville Area High School

== Notable people ==
- Blaise Alexander, NASCAR driver
- Dick Barrett "Kewpie", baseball player
- Garth Everett, Pennsylvania state legislator
- John Gosse Freeze, 19th century lawyer and writer
- Johnny Jolin, Country musician
- Adam Makos, author
- Kelly Mazzante, WNBA player
- Mike Mussina, baseball pitcher for the Baltimore Orioles and New York Yankees
- Tom O'Malley, baseball player
- Aaron Ryder, film producer
- Eugene Yaw, Pennsylvania State Senator

== In media ==
- In Marvel Comics, Mountoursville, PA is referenced as being major Spider-Man character Mary Jane Watson’s place of birth.

== See also ==
History of Lycoming County, Pennsylvania
