= Derr Run =

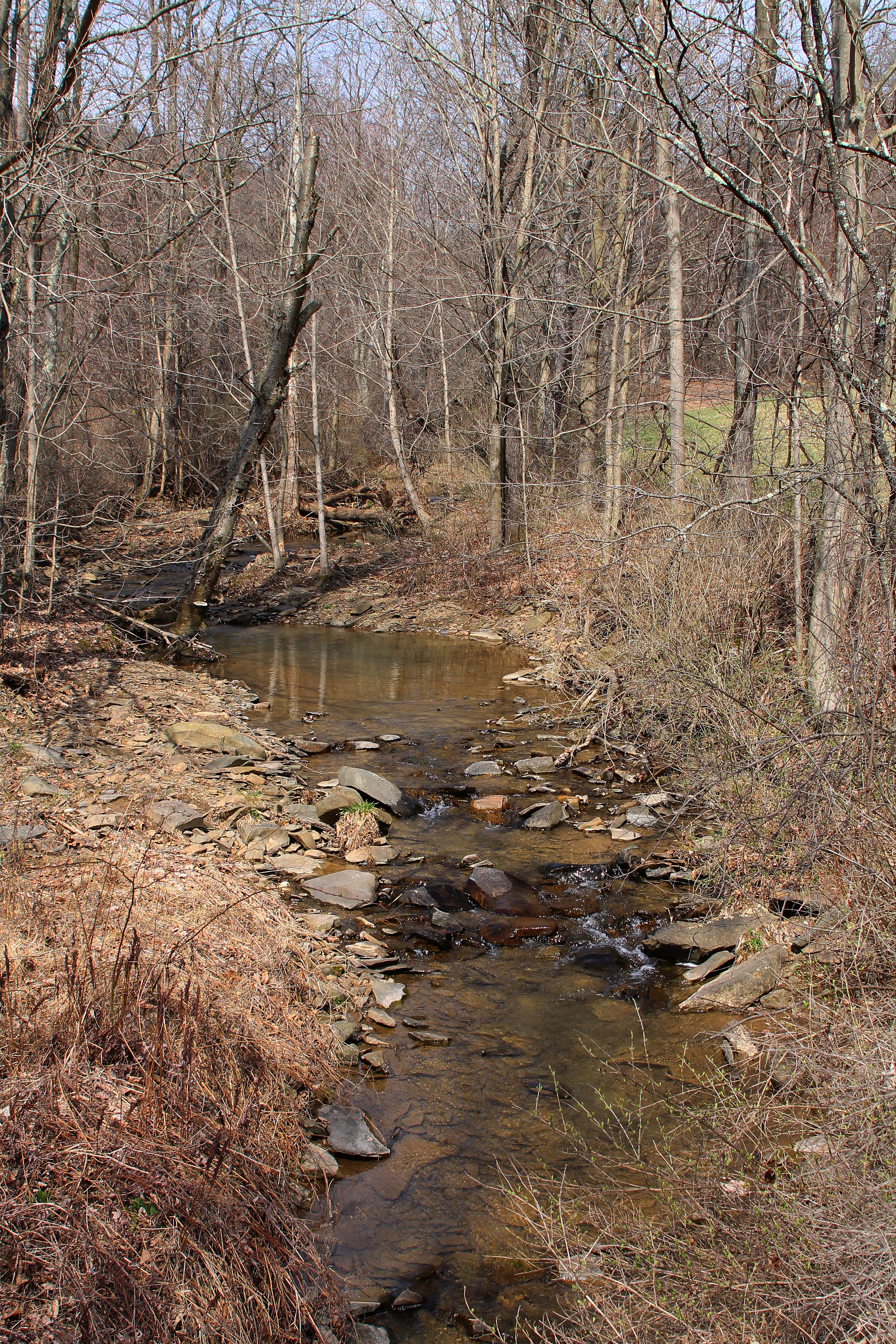
- Derr Run looking upstream

Physical characteristics
- Source
  - location: small pond on a hill in Penn Township, Lycoming County, Pennsylvania
  - elevation: 1,212 ft (369 m)
- Mouth
  - location: Little Muncy Creek in Franklin Township, Lycoming County, Pennsylvania near Lairdsville
  - coordinates: 41°13′13″N 76°37′26″W
  - elevation: 702 ft (214 m)
- Length: 2.9 mi (4.7 km)

Basin features
- Progression: Little Muncy Creek → Muncy Creek → West Branch Susquehanna River → Susquehanna River → Chesapeake Bay

Derr Run is a tributary of Little Muncy Creek in Lycoming County, Pennsylvania, in the United States. It is approximately 2.9 miles (4.7 km) long and flows through Penn Township and Franklin Township. The watershed of the stream has an area of 1.61 square miles (4.2 km^{2}). It is classified as a Coldwater Fishery and a Migratory Fishery.

== Course ==
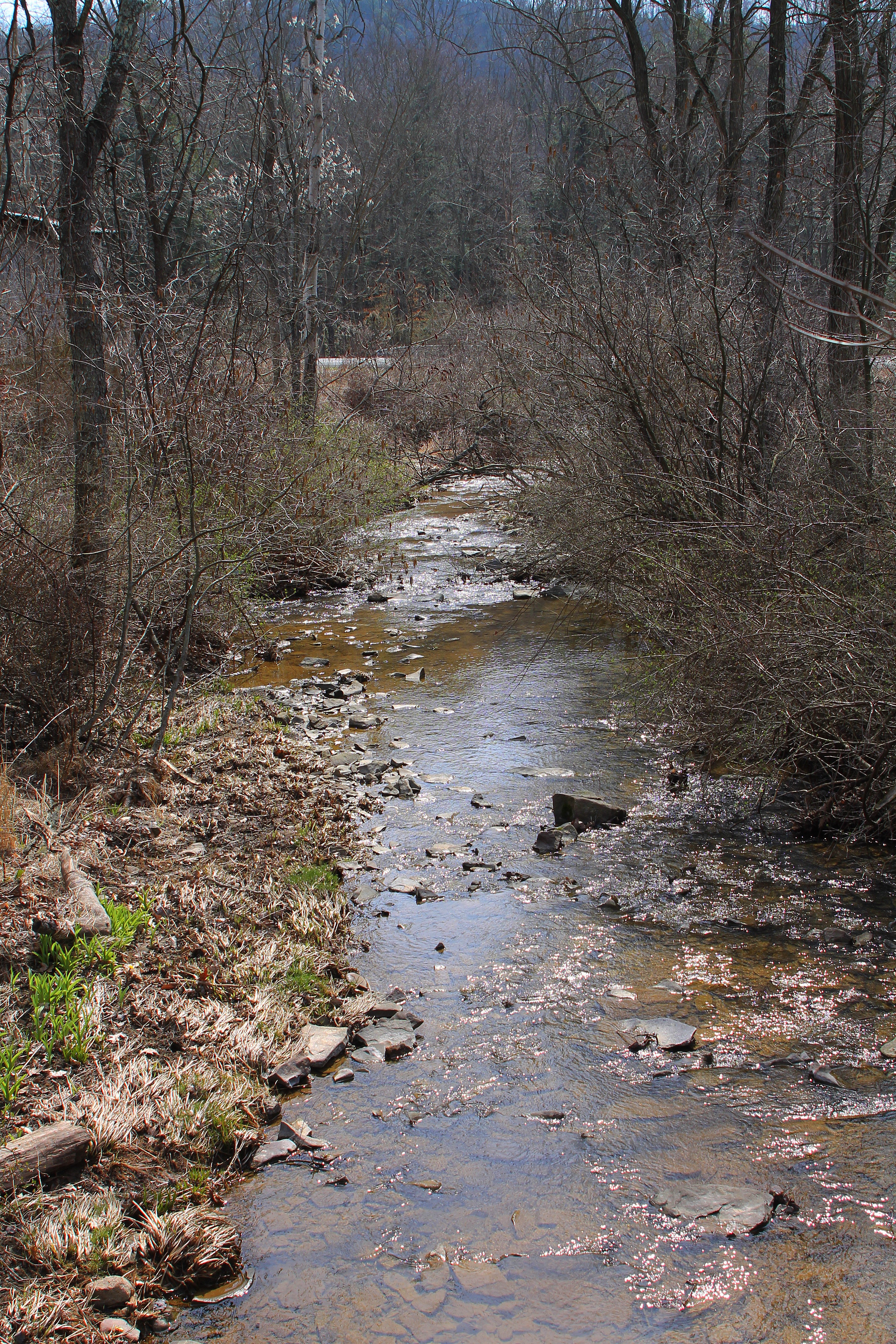
Derr Run looking downstream

Derr Run begins in a small pond on a hill in Penn Township. It flows south for several tenths of a mile and enters a valley before turning south-southeast. After several tenths of a mile, the stream turns south for a few tenths of a mile before turning south-southeast again and entering Penn Township. Several tenths of a mile further downstream, it turns southeast for several tenths of a mile. The stream then leaves its valley, crosses Pennsylvania Route 118, and turns southwest, flowing through the valley of Little Muncy Creek. After a few tenths of a mile, it reaches its confluence with Little Muncy Creek.

Derr Run joins Little Muncy Creek 13.09 miles (21.07 km) upstream of its mouth.

== Geography and geology ==
The elevation near the mouth of Derr Run is 702 feet (214 m) above sea level. The elevation of the stream's source is 1,212 feet (369 m) above sea level.

There is a spring in the watershed of Derr Run.

== Watershed and biology ==
The watershed of Derr Run has an area of 1.61 square miles (4.2 km^{2}). The mouth of the stream is in the United States Geological Survey quadrangle of Lairdsville. However, its source is in the quadrangle of Picture Rocks. The mouth of the stream is located within 1 mile (1.6 km) of Lairdsville.

In 2014, Waste Management of Pennsylvania, Inc. was issued an Erosion and Sediment Control Permit for which the receiving waterbody is Derr Run. In 2007, the US Gypsum Company was issued a permit to build, maintain, and operate a 17-mile (27 km) long natural gas pipeline crossing the stream in two places, as well as crossing other streams. However, one of the crossings of Derr Run was planned to involve no impact to the stream; the other was planned to impact 525 square feet (48.8 m^{2}).

Derr Run is classified as a Coldwater Fishery and a Migratory Fishery, as are all of the other named tributaries of Little Muncy Creek.

== History ==
Derr Run was entered into the Geographic Names Information System on August 2, 1979. Its identifier in the Geographic Names Information System is 1192351.

== See also ==
- Jakes Run (Little Muncy Creek), next tributary of Little Muncy Creek going downstream
- Big Run (Little Muncy Creek), next tributary of Little Muncy Creek going upstream
- List of rivers of Pennsylvania
