= Big Run (Little Muncy Creek tributary) =

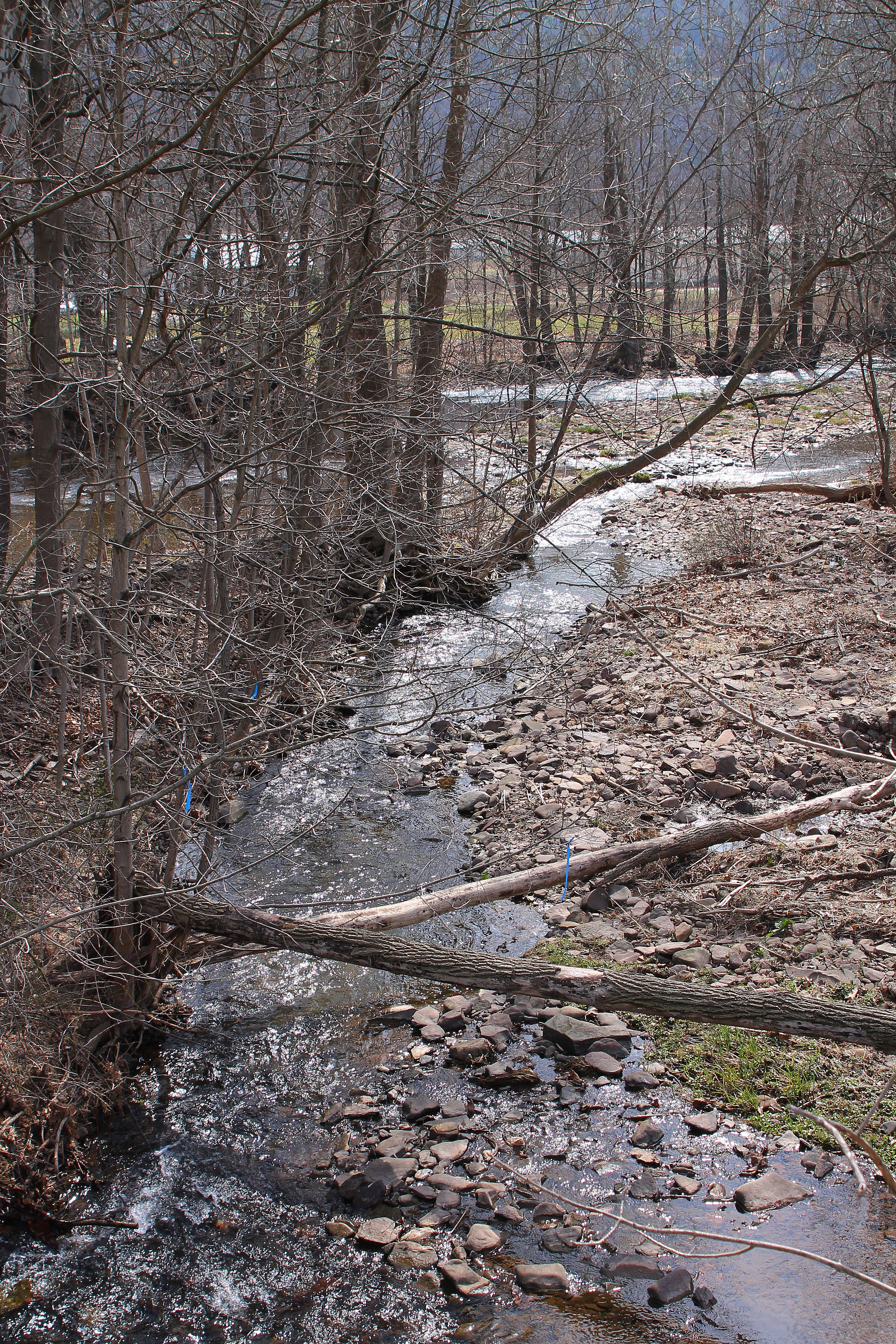
- Big Run looking downstream in its lower reaches

- Location of Big Run mouth Big Run (Little Muncy Creek tributary) (the United States)

Physical characteristics
- Source
  - location: valley in Penn Township, Lycoming County, Pennsylvania
  - elevation: 1,170 ft (360 m)
- Mouth
  - location: Little Muncy Creek in Franklin Township, Lycoming County, Pennsylvania near Lairdsville
  - coordinates: 41°13′55″N 76°36′33″W
  - elevation: 735 ft (224 m)
- Length: 4.3 mi (6.9 km)
- Basin size: 3.99 mi^{2} (10.3 km^{2})

Basin features
- Progression: Little Muncy Creek → Muncy Creek → West Branch Susquehanna River → Susquehanna River → Chesapeake Bay
- Tributaries
  - left: four unnamed tributaries
  - right: two unnamed tributaries

Big Run is a tributary of Little Muncy Creek in Lycoming County, Pennsylvania, in the United States. It is approximately 4.3 miles (6.9 km) long and flows through Penn Township and Franklin Township. The watershed of the stream has an area of 3.99 square miles (10.3 km^{2}). The stream is impaired by a high total concentration of nitrogen. A number of bridges have been constructed across it.

== Course ==
Big Run begins in a valley in Penn Township. It flows southwest for a few tenths of a mile before turning west for a few tenths of a mile. The stream then turns south-southwest. After several tenths of a mile, it receives an unnamed tributary from the right and turns south-southwest for a few miles. In this reach, it receives one unnamed tributary from the left and one from the right before entering Franklin Township, where it receives three more unnamed tributaries from the left. The stream's valley then widens before the stream reaches the end of the valley, crosses Pennsylvania Route 118, and reaches its confluence with Little Muncy Creek.

Big Run joins Little Muncy Creek 14.22 miles (22.88 km) upstream of its mouth.

== Hydrology ==
Big Run is classified as impaired due to high total nitrogen levels. It is a United States Department of Agriculture-Natural Resources Conservation Service priority watershed, as well as a United States Environmental Protection Agency priority agricultural steam.

== Geography and geology ==
The elevation near the mouth of Big Run is 735 feet (224 m) above sea level. The elevation of the stream's source is 1,170 feet (360 m) above sea level.

The surficial geology along the valley floor in parts of the middle or upper reaches of Big Run mostly consists of alluvium, which contains stratified sand and gravel. However, there are patches of Wisconsinan Till, Wisconsinan and Illinoian Lag, Illinoian Till, and Illinoian Lag nearby, and the valley sides have surficial geology of bedrock consisting of sandstone and shale in some reaches.

During the Wisconsinan Glaciation, the ice profile in the valley of Big Run was 640 feet per mile (121 m/km) in the last 0.5 miles (0.80 km) before the terminus. The maximum extent of the ice during the Wisconsinan Glaciation crossed Big Run's course.

== Watershed ==
The watershed of Big Run has an area of 3.99 square miles (10.3 km^{2}). The mouth of the stream is in the United States Geological Survey quadrangle of Lairdsville. However, its source is in the quadrangle of Sonestown. The stream also passes through the quadrangle of Picture Rocks. The mouth of the stream is located within 1 mile (1.6 km) of Lairdsville.

The hydrologic unit code of the watershed of Big Run is 020502060702. A pipeline crosses the stream at one point.

== History ==
Big Run was entered into the Geographic Names Information System on August 2, 1979. Its identifier in the Geographic Names Information System is 1192138.

A concrete stringer/multi-beam or girder bridge carrying State Route 2015 over Big Run was built 1 mile (1.6 km) north of Lairdsville in 1929 and is 32.2 feet (9.8 m) long. A concrete tee beam bridge carrying a township road and Pennsylvania Route 118 over the stream was built in Lairdsville in 1937 and is 33.1 feet (10.1 m) long.

In January 2011, Chief Gathering LLC., a subsidiary of Chief Oil & Gas, received a $34,000 fine from the Pennsylvania Department of Environmental Protection for discharging approximately 25,200 US gallons (95,000 L) of hydrostatic testing water into the watershed of Big Run during a pipeline testing project in August 2010 in Penn Township.

== See also ==
- Derr Run, next tributary of Little Muncy Creek going downstream
- Beaver Run (Little Muncy Creek), next tributary of Little Muncy Creek going upstream
- List of rivers of Pennsylvania
