= Beaver Run (Little Muncy Creek tributary) =

Beaver Run Beaver Dam Run
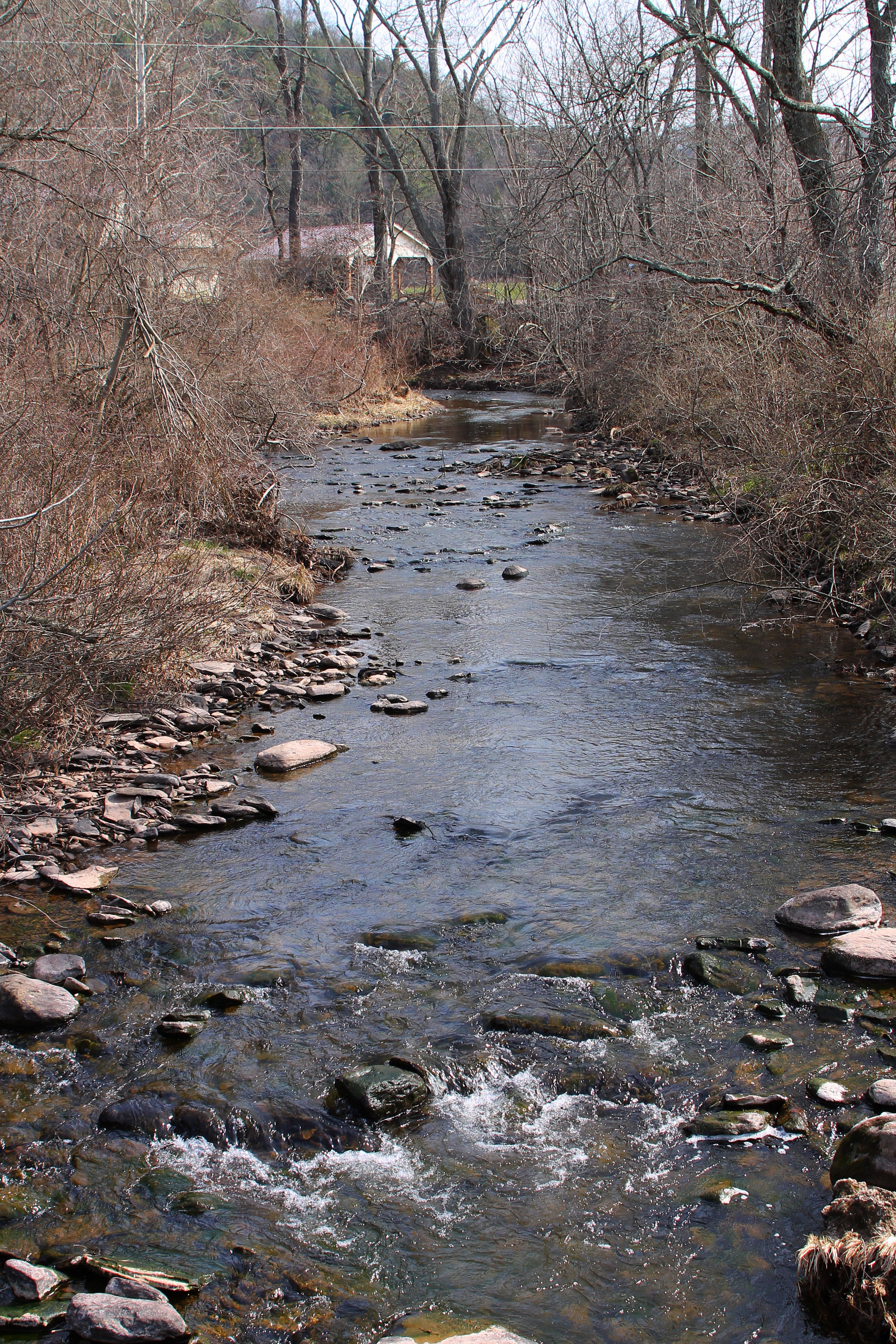
- Beaver Run looking upstream

- Location of Beaver Run mouth Beaver Run (Little Muncy Creek tributary) (the United States)

Physical characteristics
- Source
  - location: North Mountain region in Davidson Township, Sullivan County, Pennsylvania
  - elevation: 2,261 ft (689 m)
- Mouth
  - location: Little Muncy Creek in Franklin Township, Sullivan County, Pennsylvania near Lairdsville\
  - coordinates: 41°14′24″N 76°36′12″W
  - elevation: 761 ft (232 m)
- Length: 7.9 mi (12.7 km)
- Basin size: 12.7 mi^{2} (33 km^{2})

Basin features
- Progression: Little Muncy Creek → Muncy Creek → West Branch Susquehanna River → Susquehanna River → Chesapeake Bay
- Tributaries
  - left: Marsh Run

Beaver Run (also known as Beaver Dam Run) is a tributary of Little Muncy Creek in Sullivan County and Lycoming County, in Pennsylvania, in the United States. It is approximately 7.9 miles (12.7 km) long and flows through Davidson Township in Sullivan County and Penn Township and Franklin Township in Lycoming County. The watershed of the stream has an area of 12.7 square miles (33 km^{2}). The stream is dammed by the Beaver Lake Dam and a number of bridges have been constructed across it. Beaver Run has one named tributary, which is known as Marsh Run.

== Course ==
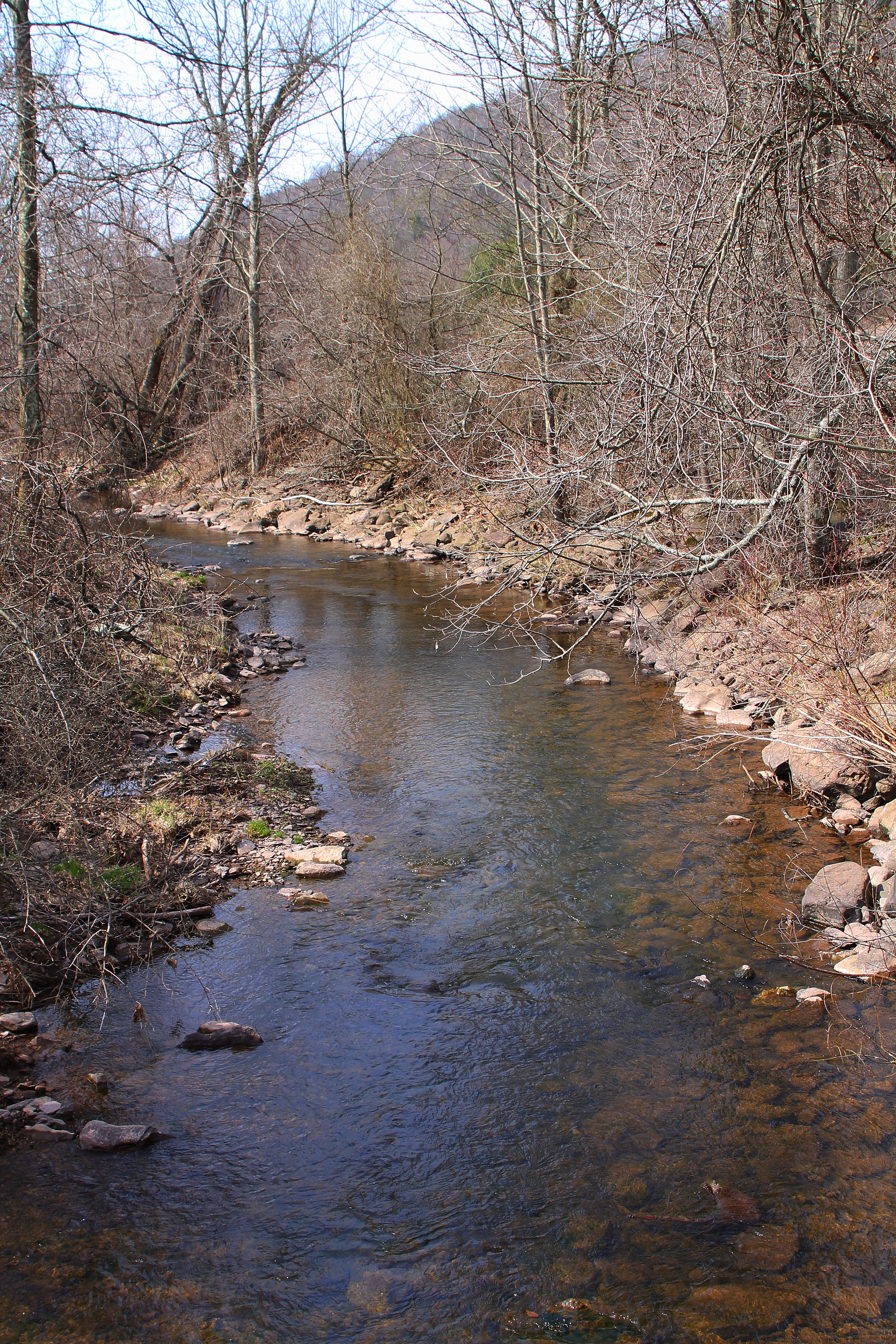
Beaver Run looking downstream

Beaver Run begins in the North Mountain region in Davidson Township, Sullivan County. It flows west-northwest for more than a mile, crossing Pennsylvania Route 42, reaching the base of the mountain, and entering a valley. The stream then turns south-southwest for several tenths of a mile before passing through two wetlands and three ponds and entering Beaver Lake. In Beaver Lake, it enters Penn Township, Lycoming County and from the southern end of the lake, the stream turns south-southwest for several tenths of a mile, flowing past Bad Hill. It then turns south-southeast for more than a mile before receiving its only named tributary, Marsh Run, from the left and turning south. Several tenths of a mile further downstream, it enters Franklin Township and continues flowing south for a few tenths of a mile before turning south-southwest for more than a mile. The stream's valley then widens and it turns southwest for several tenths of a mile before reaching its confluence with Little Muncy Creek.

Beaver Run joins Little Muncy Creek 14.90 miles (23.98 km) upstream of its mouth.

=== Tributaries ===
Beaver Run has one named tributary, which is known as Marsh Run. Marsh Run joins Beaver Run 2.38 miles (3.83 km) upstream of its mouth and drains an area of 3.80 square miles (9.8 km^{2}).

== Geography and geology ==
The elevation near the mouth of Beaver Run is 761 feet (232 m) above sea level. The elevation of the stream's source is 2,261 feet (689 m) above sea level. A lake known as Beaver Lake is situated on the stream; the lake has an area of approximately 73 acres (30 ha). Most of the lake is in Penn Township, Lycoming County, but a portion is in Davidson Township, Sullivan County.

Wisconsinan Outwash, which consists of stratified sand and gravel, forms terraces along the flank of the valley of Beaver Run. Alluvium also occurs in the surficial geology in the vicinity of the stream, as does Wisconsinan Bouldery Till and a patch of Wisconsinan Ice-Contact Stratified Drift. Further upstream, there is Wisconsinan Till, alluvial fan, and a lake. Bedrock consisting of sandstone and shale occurs in the surficial geology near the stream's valley throughout much of its length.

Uranium has been observed in sedimentary rocks at the bottom of a bluff on the west side of Beaver Run. During the Wisconsinan Glaciation, the ice profile in the Beaver Run valley was 450 to 500 feet per mile (85 to 95 m/km). The stream's valley, which runs north-to-south (parallel to the glaciers during the Ice Age), has been significantly deepened by glacial scour.

== Hydrology and watershed ==
The watershed of Beaver Run has an area of 12.7 square miles (33 km^{2}). The mouth of the stream is in the United States Geological Survey quadrangle of Lairdsville. However, its source is in the quadrangle of Sonestown. Its mouth is within 1 mile (1.6 km) of Lairdsville.

A dam known as the Beaver Lake Dam is on Beaver Run. The dam is an earthfill dam with a vertical wall of concrete for an upstream slope. The dam is 9 feet (2.7 m) high, approximately 12 feet (3.7 m) wide at the crest, and 179 feet (55 m) long. Its spillway is in the center and is 19 feet (5.8 m) long.

A total of 3.52 miles (5.66 km) of Beaver Run and its unnamed tributaries are designated as impaired waterbodies. The impairment is related to agricultural activity.

== History ==
Beaver Run was entered into the Geographic Names Information System on August 2, 1979. Its identifier in the Geographic Names Information System is 1192109. The stream is also known as Beaver Dam Run. This variant name appears in the 1880 book The Geology of Lycoming County by Andrew Sherwood and Franklin Platt.

Historically, there were copper works on Beaver Run. In the early 1800s, the stream was classified by law as a public highway between the mouth and these copper works.

A concrete stringer/multi-beam or girder bridge carrying T-708 over Beaver Run was built in 1920 and repaired in 1968. It is 33.1 feet (10.1 m) long and is situated 1.7 miles (2.7 km) northeast of Lairdsville. A concrete frame bridge carrying T-706 over the stream was built in the same year 1.7 miles (2.7 km) south of Beaver Lake and is 27.9 feet (8.5 m) long. A steel stringer/multi-beam or girder bridge carrying State Route 2061 6 miles (9.7 km) north of Lairdsville was constructed over the stream in 1939 and repaired in 1990. This bridge is 41.0 feet (12.5 m) long. A prestressed box beam or girders bridge carrying State Route 2077 over Beaver Run was built in 1985 1 mile (1.6 km) north of Lairdsville and is 48.9 feet (14.9 m) long.

== See also ==
- Big Run (Little Muncy Creek), next tributary of Little Muncy Creek going downstream
- Little Indian Run (Little Muncy Creek), next tributary of Little Muncy Creek going upstream
- List of rivers of Pennsylvania
