= German Run =

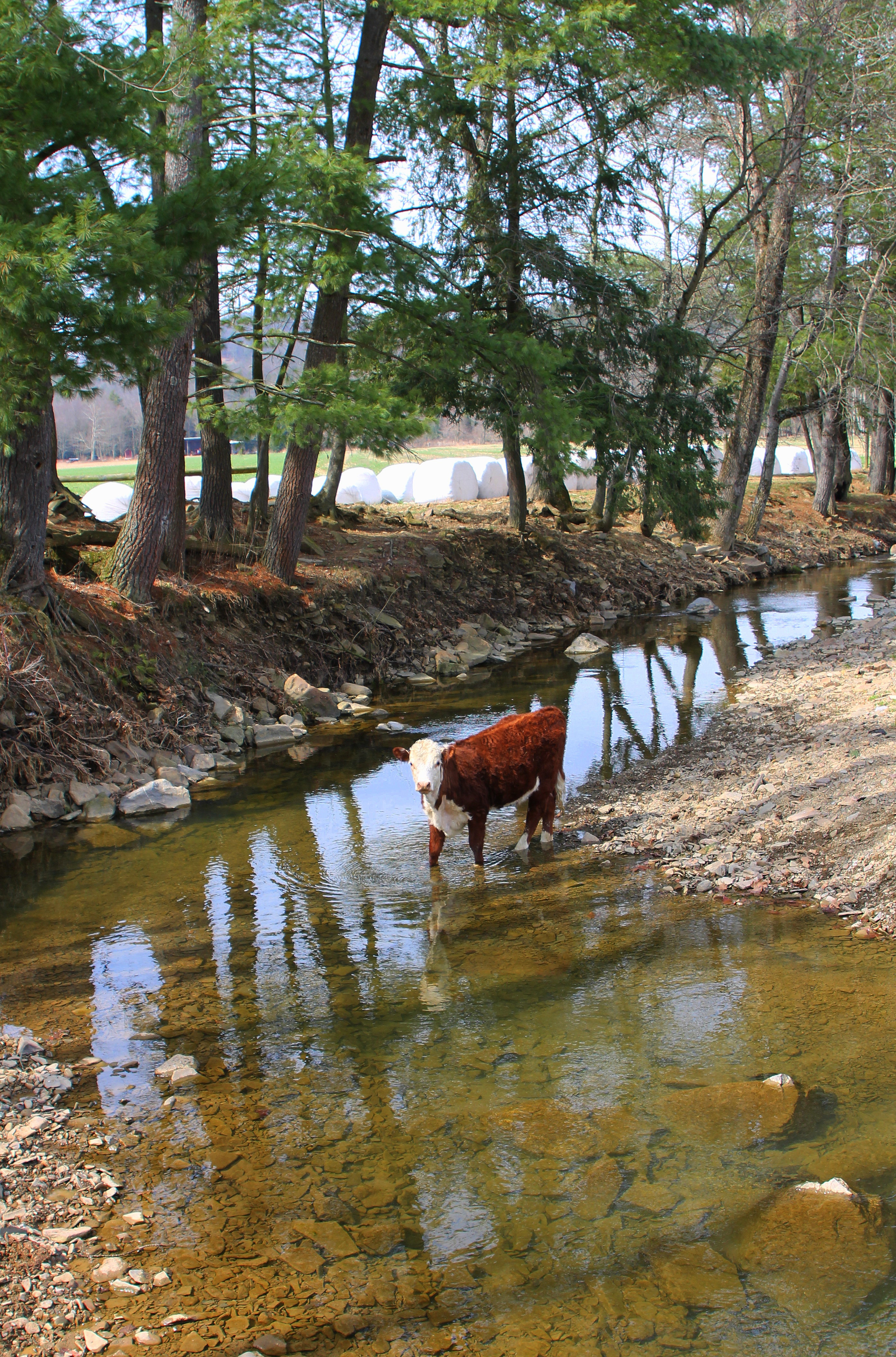
- German Run looking downstream

Physical characteristics
- Source
  - location: hill between Buck Ridge and Northside Ridge in Franklin Township, Lycoming County, Pennsylvania
  - elevation: 1,273 ft (388 m)
- Mouth
  - location: Little Muncy Creek in Moreland Township, Lycoming County, Pennsylvania near Moreland
  - coordinates: 41°11′50″N 76°38′15″W
  - elevation: 646 ft (197 m)
- Length: 4.9 mi (7.9 km)
- Basin size: 6.87 mi^{2} (17.8 km^{2})

Basin features
- Progression: Little Muncy Creek → Muncy Creek → West Branch Susquehanna River → Susquehanna River → Chesapeake Bay
- Tributaries
  - left: four unnamed tributaries
  - right: three unnamed tributaries

German Run is a tributary of Little Muncy Creek in Lycoming County, Pennsylvania, in the United States. It is approximately 4.9 miles (7.9 km) long and flows through Franklin Township and Moreland Township. The watershed of the stream has an area of 6.87 square miles (17.8 km^{2}). Part of the stream and one of its unnamed tributaries are designated as impaired waterbodies, with the source of the impairment being agriculture. German Run is classified as a Coldwater Fishery and a Migratory Fishery. Natural gas operations have occurred in the general vicinity of the stream.

== Course ==
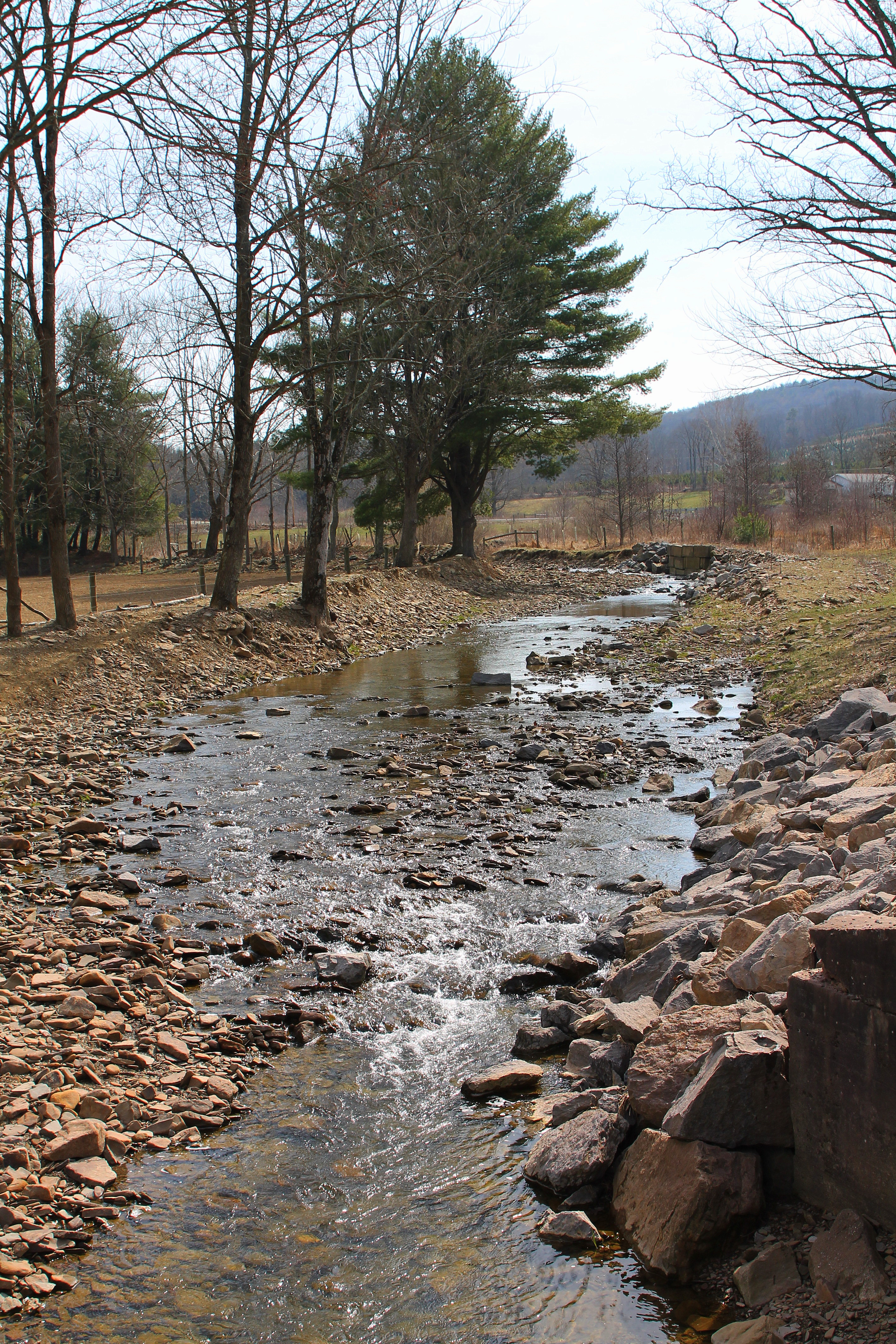
German Run looking upstream

German Run begins on a hill between Buck Ridge and Northside Ridge in Franklin Township. It flows south through a valley for several tenths of a mile before receiving an unnamed tributary from the left and turning west-northwest for several tenths of a mile. In this reach, the stream receives an unnamed tributary from the right before turning west-southwest for several tenths of a mile, receiving two more unnamed tributaries from the right. It then turns southwest for several tenths of a mile, receiving one unnamed tributary from the left and one from the right before entering Moreland Township. Here, the stream turns west-southwest for several tenths of a mile and its valley becomes much shallower. It receives an unnamed tributary from the left before turning west-northwest. After a few tenths of a mile, the stream turns west-southwest for a few tenths of a mile, leaving its valley. An unnamed distributary then branches off, quickly joining Little Muncy Creek, while German Run itself turns south-southwest for several tenths of a mile, receiving another unnamed tributary from the left, before turning north and then west, quickly reaching its confluence with Little Muncy Creek.

German Run joins Little Muncy Creek 10.78 miles (17.35 km) upstream of its mouth.

== Hydrology ==
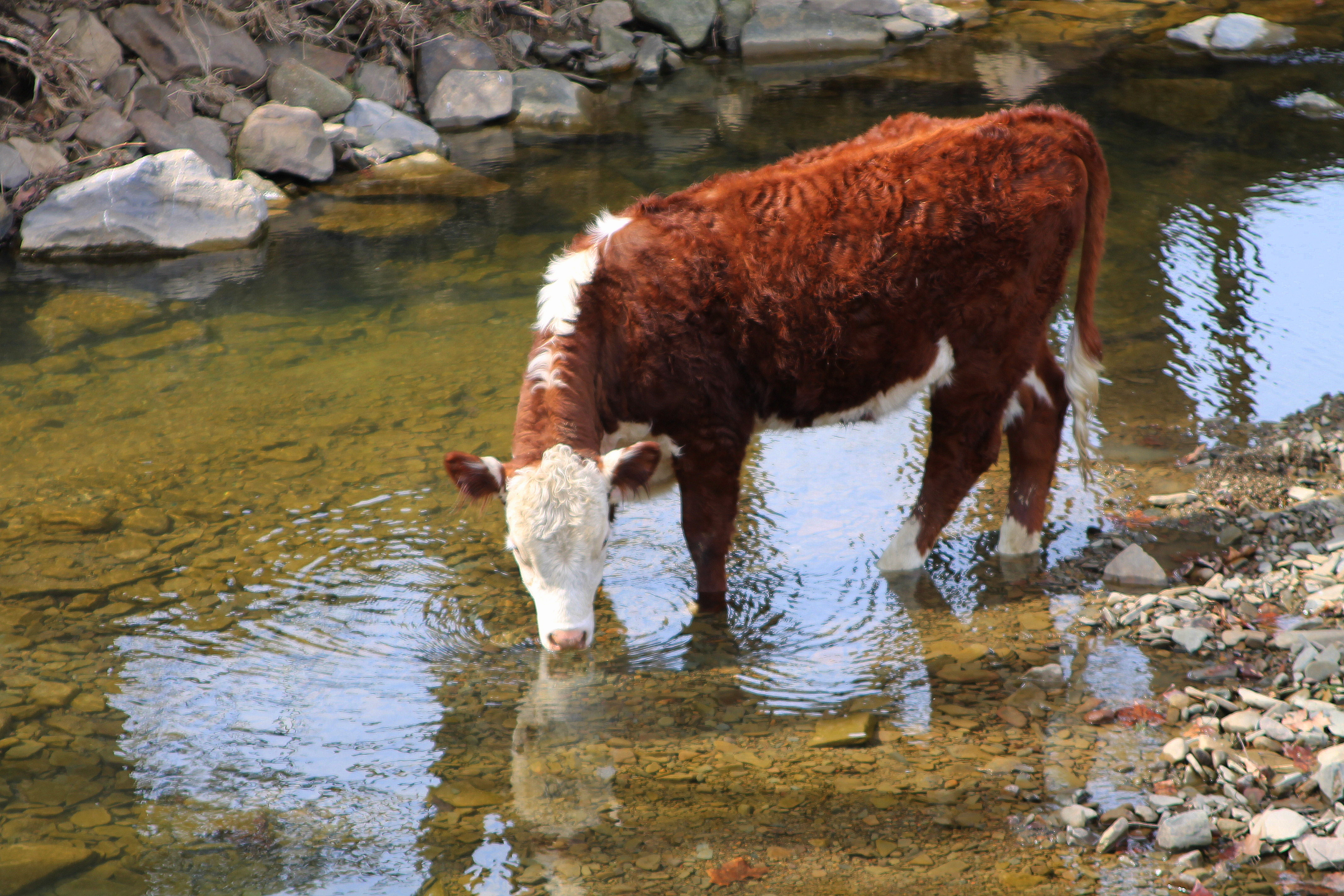
A cow in German Run

A reach of German Run is designated as an impaired waterbody. The causes of the impairment are organic enrichment/low dissolved oxygen and sedimentation/siltation. The likely source of the impairment is agriculture. Part or all of an unnamed tributary known as Unt 19501 is also impaired, with the same causes and probable source.

The peak 10-year discharge of German Run at its mouth is 1,320 cubic feet per second (37 m^{3}/s). The peak 50-year discharge is 2,210 cubic feet per second (63 m^{3}/s) and the peak 100-year discharge is 2,570 cubic feet per second (73 m^{3}/s). The peak 500-year discharge is 3,400 cubic feet per second (96 m^{3}/s).

== Geography and geology ==
The elevation near the mouth of German Run is 646 feet (197 m) above sea level. The elevation of the stream's source is 1,273 feet (388 m) above sea level.

== Watershed and biology ==
The watershed of German Run has an area of 6.87 square miles (17.8 km^{2}). The mouth of the stream is in the United States Geological Survey quadrangle of Hughesville. However, its source is in the quadrangle of Lairdsville. The mouth of the stream is located within 1 mile (1.6 km) of Moreland.

The designated use of German Run is aquatic life. The stream is classified as a Coldwater Fishery and a Migratory Fishery.

== History ==
German Run was entered into the Geographic Names Information System on August 2, 1979. Its identifier in the Geographic Names Information System is 1175553.

A concrete tee beam bridge carrying State Route 2019 over German Run was built in 1937 7 miles (11 km) east of Clarkstown and is 26.9 feet (8.2 m) long. A concrete slab bridge carrying State Route 2015 was constructed across the stream 1.5 miles (2.4 km) south of Lairdsville in 1949 and is 22.0 feet (6.7 m) long. A concrete culvert bridge carrying State Route 2019 across German Run was constructed in 2009 5 miles (8.0 km) east of Clarkstown and is 24.9 feet (7.6 m) long.

In 2011, Chief Gathering, LLC. received a permit to build, maintain, and operate a 12-inch (30 cm) natural gas pipeline crossing several unnamed tributaries of German Run. In 2015, XTO Energy was fined $95,753 after casing and cementing problems in two of its natural gas wells in the area caused surface expressions of methane in German Run and Little Muncy Creek, as well as impacting seven private water wells.

== See also ==
- Broad Run (Little Muncy Creek), next tributary of Little Muncy Creek going downstream
- Jakes Run (Little Muncy Creek), next tributary of Little Muncy Creek going upstream
- List of rivers of Pennsylvania
