= West Branch Little Muncy Creek =

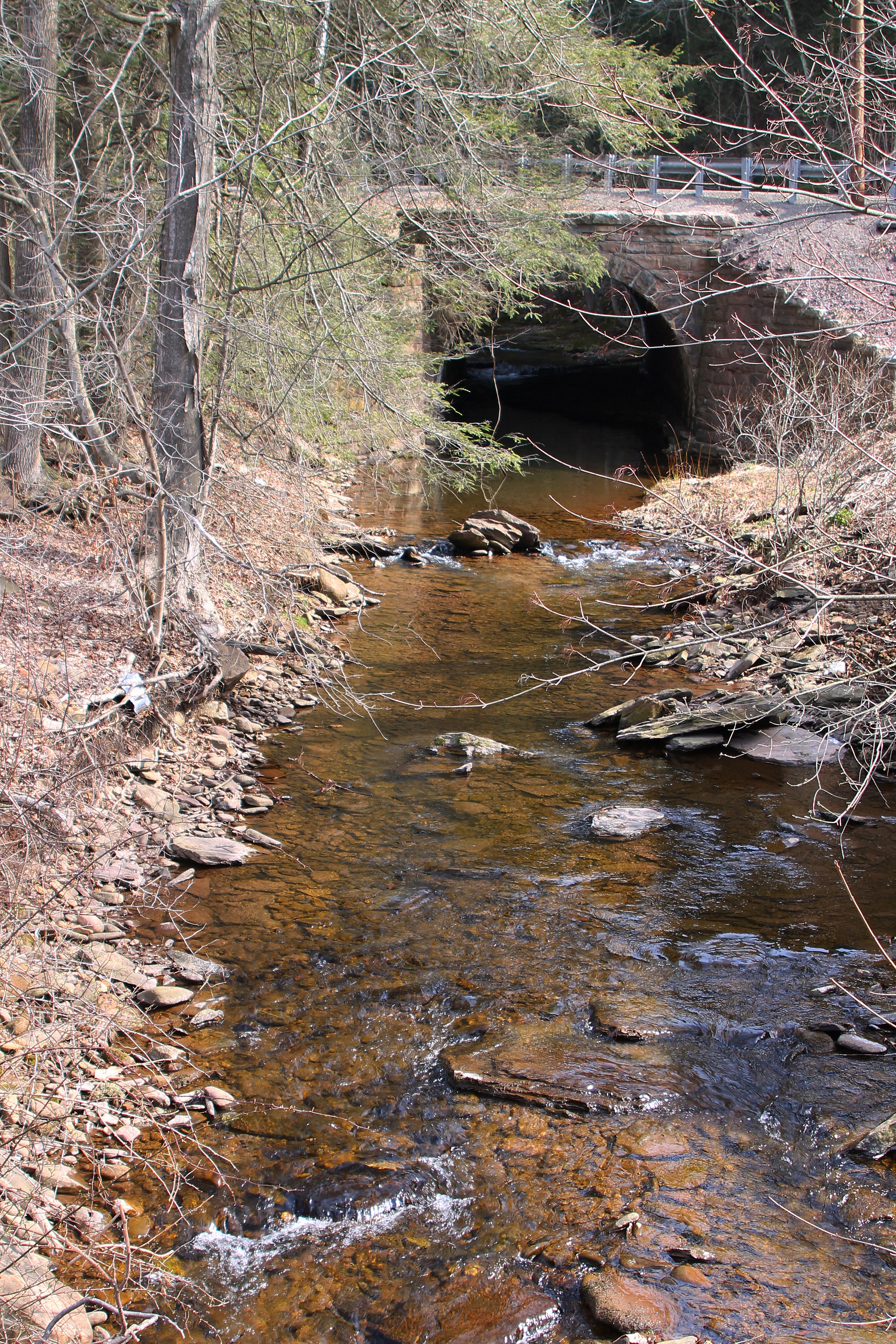
- West Branch Little Muncy Creek looking upstream

Physical characteristics
- Source
  - location: Huckleberry Mountain in Davidson Township, Sullivan County, Pennsylvania
  - elevation: 1,853 ft (565 m)
- Mouth
  - location: Little Muncy Creek in Franklin Township, Lycoming County, Pennsylvania at Biggerstown
  - coordinates: 41°15′05″N 76°31′58″W
  - elevation: 971 ft (296 m)
- Length: 3.5 mi (5.6 km)
- Basin size: 4.33 sq mi (11.2 km^{2})

Basin features
- Progression: Little Muncy Creek → Muncy Creek → West Branch Susquehanna River → Chesapeake Bay
- Tributaries
  - left: West Creek

West Branch Little Muncy Creek is a tributary of Little Muncy Creek in Sullivan County and Lycoming County, in Pennsylvania, in the United States. It is approximately 3.5 miles (5.6 km) long and flows through Davidson Township in Sullivan County and Franklin Township and Jordan Township in Lycoming County. The watershed of the creek has an area of 4.33 square miles (11.2 km^{2}). The creek has one named tributary, which is known as West Creek. The surficial geology in the vicinity of West Branch Little Muncy Creek includes alluvium, bedrock, fill, Wisconsinan and Reworked Illinoian Till, Wisconsinan Till, Wisconsinan Flow-Till, Wisconsinan Till Moraine, and Boulder Colluvium. The creek designated as a Coldwater Fishery and a Migratory Fishery and is being considered for addition to the wild trout waters list of the Pennsylvania Fish and Boat Commission.

== Course ==
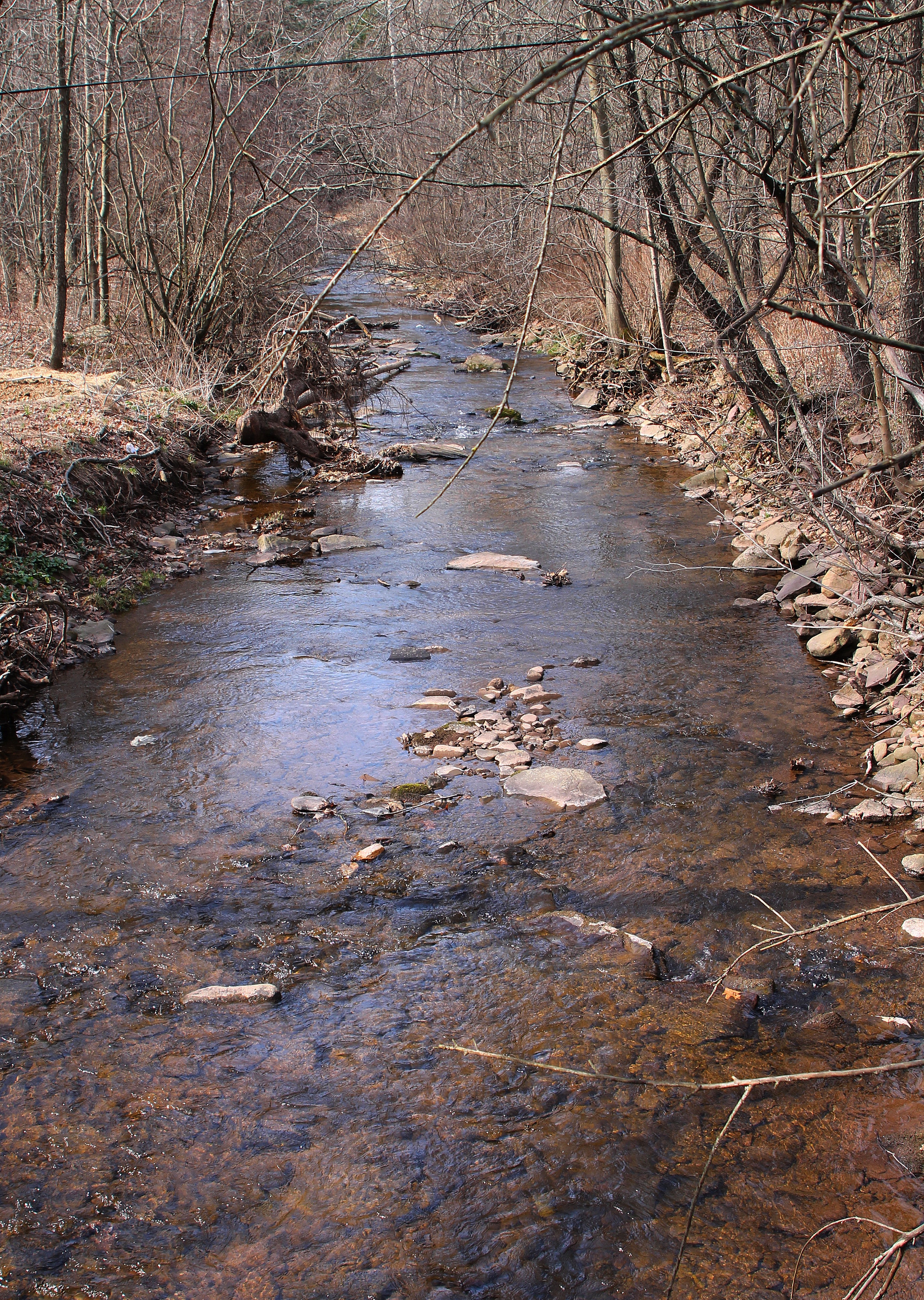
West Branch Little Muncy Creek looking downstream

West Branch Little Muncy Creek begins on Huckleberry Mountain in Davidson Township, Sullivan County. It flows southwest for several tenths of a mile, entering Franklin Township, Lycoming County and crossing Pennsylvania Route 42 before turning south-southeast. The creek flows in this direction for several tenths of a mile along Pennsylvania Route 42, passing through a pond before turning southeast. After a few tenths of a mile, it turns south-southeast, entering Jordan Township and receiving its only named tributary, West Creek from the left. The creek then turns south-southwest for several tenths of a mile, still flowing alongside Pennsylvania Route 42. It then turns south-southeast for a few tenths of a mile before turning south-southwest. The creek then reaches the end of its valley and reaches its confluence with Little Muncy Creek.

West Branch Little Muncy Creek joins Little Muncy Creek 19.35 miles (31.14 km) upstream of its mouth.

=== Tributaries ===
West Branch Little Muncy Creek has one named tributary, which is known as West Creek. West Creek joins West Branch Little Muncy Creek 1.36 miles (2.19 km) upstream of its mouth, near Biggerstown, and drains an area of 1.56 square miles (4.0 km^{2}).

== Geography and geology ==
The elevation near the mouth of West Branch Little Muncy Creek is 971 feet (296 m) above sea level. The elevation of the creek's source is 1,853 feet (565 m) above sea level.

The surficial geology alongside West Branch Little Muncy Creek in its lower reaches mainly consists of alluvium. However, there is a patch of fill at the mouth and bedrock consisting of sandstone and shale occurs on the sides of the creek's valley. However, a large area of Wisconsinan and Reworked Illinoian Till occurs in the surficial geology further upstream, and there are a few patches of it near the creek's lower reaches as well. In areas with shale bedrock, this till's matrix is clayey silt, while in areas with sandstone bedrock, it is clayey sand. There are clasts of sandstone and conglomerate ranging in size from cobbles to boulders. Further upstream, there is Wisconsinan Till, Wisconsinan Flow-Till, and Wisconsinan Till Moraine. In the creek's upper reaches, on Huckleberry Mountain, the surficial geology consists of Boulder Colluvium (which is mostly covered in quartz, sandstone, or conglomerate boulders) and bedrock consisting of sandstone and shale.

The course of West Branch Little Muncy Creek passes through the furthest extent of the glaciers during the Wisconsinan Glaciation.

== Watershed ==
The watershed of West Branch Little Muncy Creek has an area of 4.33 square miles (11.2 km^{2}). The creek is entirely within the United States Geological Survey quadrangle of Sonestown.

A proposed natural gas pipeline would cross West Branch Little Muncy Creek and numerous other streams in the area.

== History ==
West Branch Little Muncy Creek was entered into the Geographic Names Information System on August 2, 1979. Its identifier in the Geographic Names Information System is 1190913.

== Biology ==
West Branch Little Muncy Creek is being considered for wild trout designation by the Pennsylvania Fish and Boat Commission. The stream was surveyed on July 2, 2013 and listed on the Pennsylvania Fish and Boat Commission website as being considered for wild trout designation on January 20, 2015.

West Branch Little Muncy Creek is designated as a Coldwater Fishery and a Migratory Fishery. Although the creek's designated use is Coldwater Fishery and Migratory Fishery, its existing use is Exceptional Value and Migratory Fishery, as of 2012.

== See also ==
- Little Indian Run (Little Muncy Creek), next tributary of Little Muncy Creek going downstream
- Buck Run (Little Muncy Creek), next tributary of Little Muncy Creek going upstream
- List of rivers of Pennsylvania
