= Little Indian Run (Little Muncy Creek tributary) =

Little Indian Run Indian Camp Run

Physical characteristics
- Source
  - location: pond at the base of Huckleberry Mountain in Franklin Township, Lycoming County, Pennsylvania
  - elevation: 1,449 ft (442 m)
- Mouth
  - location: Little Muncy Creek on the border between Jordan Township, Lycoming County, Pennsylvania and Franklin Township, Lycoming County, Pennsylvania near Unityville
  - coordinates: 41°14′34″N 76°33′39″W
  - elevation: 873 ft (266 m)
- Length: 4.3 mi (6.9 km)
- Basin size: 3.36 mi^{2} (8.7 km^{2})

Basin features
- Progression: Little Muncy Creek → Muncy Creek → West Branch Susquehanna River → Susquehanna River → Chesapeake Bay
- Tributaries
  - left: three unnamed tributaries
  - right: three unnamed tributaries

Little Indian Run (also known as Indian Camp Run) is a tributary of Little Muncy Creek in Lycoming County and Sullivan County, in Pennsylvania, in the United States. It is approximately 4.3 miles (6.9 km) long and flows through Franklin Township and Jordan Township in Lycoming County and Davidson Township in Sullivan County. The watershed of the stream has an area of 3.36 square miles (8.7 km^{2}). The surficial geology in the stream's vicinity mainly consists of alluvium, bedrock, Wisconsinan Till, Wisconsinan Till Moraine, and Wisconsinan Ice-Contact Stratified Drift. Wild trout naturally reproduce within the stream. A number of sawmills were historically located on the stream.

== Course ==
Little Indian Run begins in a pond at the base of Huckleberry Mountain in Franklin Township, Lycoming County. It flows east-southeast for a few tenths of a mile, briefly passing through Davidson Township, Sullivan County. The stream then turns south-southwest for a few tenths of a mile, crossing Pennsylvania Route 42 before turning south-southeast for several tenths of a mile. In this reach, it passes through two more ponds and a wetland and receives an unnamed tributary from the left. It then turns south for more than a mile, its valley deepens, and it receives two unnamed tributaries from the left and two from the right. The stream then begins flowing south-southwest for several tenths of a mile along and/or the boundary between Franklin Township and Jordan Township. It then receives an unnamed tributary from the right and turns south. After several tenths of a mile, the stream reaches the end of its valley and turns west. After a few tenths of a mile, it turns southwest for a short distance, crossing Pennsylvania Route 442 and reaching its confluence with Little Muncy Creek.

Little Indian Run joins Little Muncy Creek 17.61 miles (28.34 km) upstream of its mouth.

== Geography and geology ==
The elevation near the mouth of Little Indian Run is 873 feet (266 m) above sea level. The elevation near the stream's source is 1,449 feet (442 m) above sea level.

The surficial geology along the middle reaches of the valley floor of Little Indian Run mainly consists of alluvium. However, bedrock consisting of sandstone and shale makes up the surficial geology on the sides of the stream's valley in this reach. Further upstream, there are large patches of Wisconsinan Till and Wisconsinan Till Moraine and smaller patches of Wisconsinan Ice-Contact Stratified Drift, which contains stratified sand, gravel, and some boulders.

The upper reaches of Little Indian Run are in an area that was covered in glaciers during the Wisconsinan Glaciation. However, the lower reaches are beyond the maximum extend of the glaciers. Red rock of the Catskill Formation occurs near the stream, and various fish fossils have been observed in this rock.

== Watershed and biology ==
The watershed of Little Indian Run has an area of 3.36 square miles (8.7 km^{2}). The mouth of the stream is in the United States Geological Survey quadrangle of Lairdsville. However, its source is in the quadrangle of Sonestown. The stream's mouth is located near Unityville.

A bridge carrying T-738 over Little Indian Run is owned by Jordan Township. The Transcontinental Gas Pipe Line Company, LLC. has applied for and/or received a permit to build and maintain a natural gas pipeline crossing the stream.

== History ==
Little Indian Run was entered into the Geographic Names Information System on August 2, 1979. Its identifier in the Geographic Names Information System is 1179566. The stream is also known as Indian Camp Run. This variant name appears in the 1880 book The Geology of Lycoming County by Andrew Sherwood and Franklin Platt.

Historically, there were three sawmills on Little Indian Run: the I.J. Boudeman Saw Mill, the F. Cleman Saw Mill, and the Smith & Magargel Saw Mill.

== Biology ==
Little Indian Run is classified as a Coldwater Fishery and a Migratory Fishery. Wild trout naturally reproduce in the stream from its headwaters downstream to its mouth.

== See also ==
- Beaver Run (Little Muncy Creek), next tributary of Little Muncy Creek going downstream
- West Branch Little Muncy Creek, next tributary of Little Muncy Creek going upstream
- List of rivers of Pennsylvania
