= Jakes Run (Little Muncy Creek tributary) =

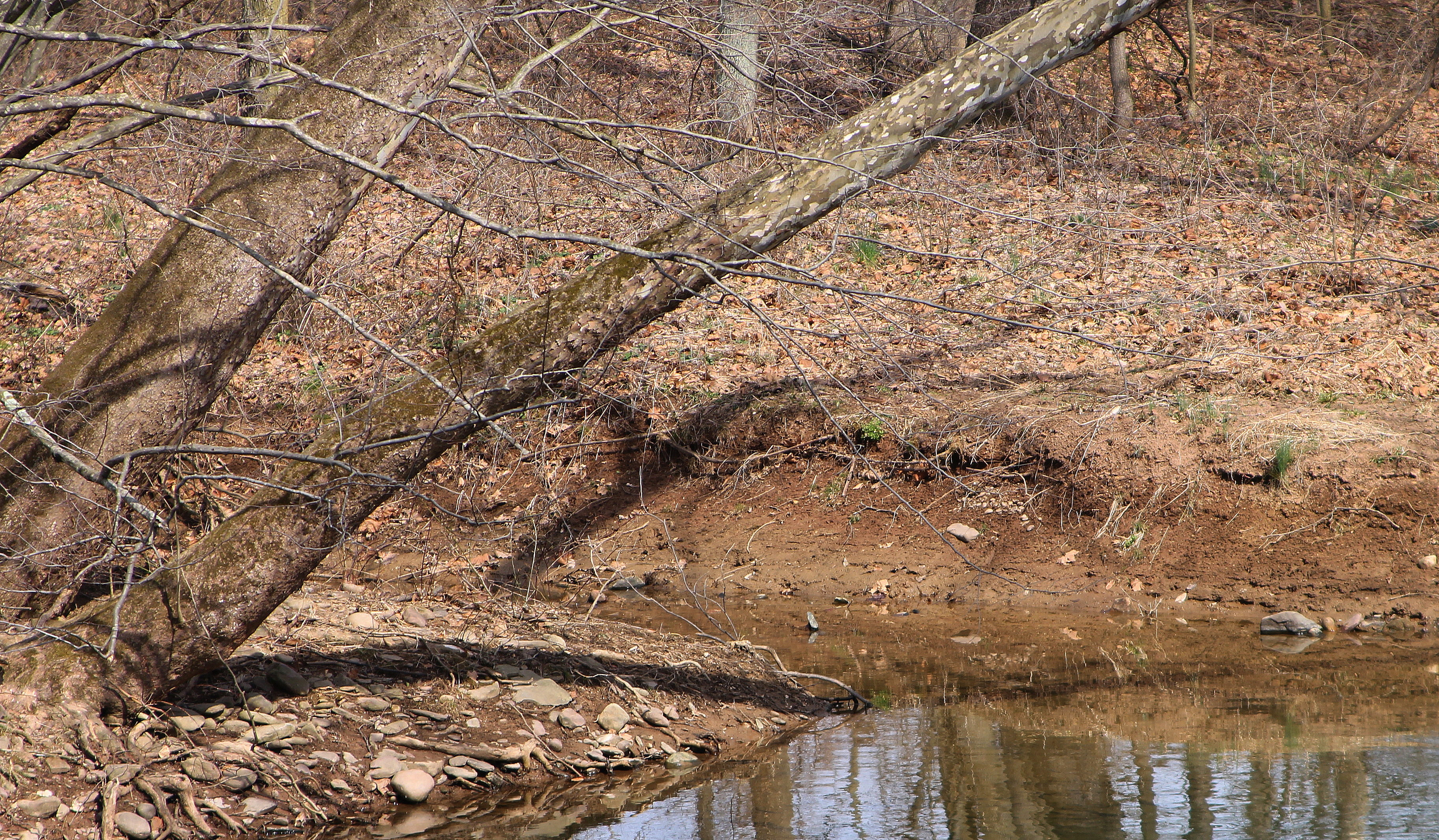
- Mouth of Jakes Run at Little Muncy Creek

Physical characteristics
- Source
  - location: hill in Penn Township, Lycoming County, Pennsylvania
  - elevation: 1,134 ft (346 m)
- Mouth
  - location: Little Muncy Creek in Moreland Township, Pennsylvania
  - coordinates: 41°12′34″N 76°38′01″W
  - elevation: 676 ft (206 m)
- Length: 2.8 mi (4.5 km)
- Basin size: 1.56 sq mi (4.0 km^{2})

Basin features
- Progression: Little Muncy Creek → Muncy Creek → West Branch Susquehanna River → Susquehanna River → Chesapeake Bay
- Tributaries
  - left: one unnamed tributary
  - right: one unnamed tributary

Jakes Run is a tributary of Little Muncy Creek in Lycoming County, Pennsylvania, in the United States. It is approximately 2.8 miles (4.5 km) long and flows through Penn Township and Moreland Township. The watershed of the stream has an area of 1.56 square miles (4.0 km^{2}). The stream is classified as a Coldwater Fishery. Jakes Run has no named tributaries, but it does have two unnamed tributaries.

== Course ==
Jakes Run begins on a hill in Penn Township. It flows south-southeast for several tenths of a mile, entering a valley, before turning south-southwest for several tenths of a mile. In this reach, the stream receives a very short unnamed tributary from the left and a longer unnamed tributary from the right. It then turns south-southeast again for a few tenths of a mile, entering Moreland Township and passing near Ball Ridge. The stream then continues flowing south-southeast for more than a mile along the eastern side of Ball Ridge. Its valley eventually widens and the stream crosses Pennsylvania Route 118, reaching the end of its valley and entering the valley of Little Muncy Creek. The stream then turns south-southeast, south, and then south-southeast again, after several tenths of a mile, reaching its confluence with Little Muncy Creek.

Jakes Run joins Little Muncy Creek 12.84 miles (20.66 km) upstream of its mouth.

== Geography and geology ==
The elevation near the mouth of Jakes Run is 676 feet (206 m) above sea level. The elevation of the stream's source is 1,134 feet (346 m) above sea level.

A person once applied for a permit to remove a flood-damaged culvert carrying Jakes Run and replace it with a 60-inch (150 cm) culvert with a stone headwall. This project was planned to impact 25 feet (7.6 m) of Jakes Run.

== Watershed and biology ==
The watershed of Jakes Run has an area of 1.56 square miles (4.0 km^{2}). The stream is entirely within the United States Geological Survey quadrangle of Hughesville. Its mouth is located near Moreland.

Jakes Run is classified as a Coldwater fishery.

== History ==
Jakes Run was entered into the Geographic Names Information System on August 2, 1979. Its identifier in the Geographic Names Information System is 1177972.

A bridge carrying T-673 crosses Jakes Run in Penn Township. In the WATS Long Range Transportation Plan, this bridge was slated for replacement sometime between 2026 and 2033. In 2016, XTO Energy Inc. received an Erosion and Sediment Control permit for which one of the receiving streams was Jakes Run.

== See also ==
- German Run, next tributary of Little Muncy Creek going downstream
- Derr Run, next tributary of Little Muncy Creek going upstream
- List of rivers of Pennsylvania
