= Buck Run (Little Muncy Creek tributary) =

- Location of Buck Run mouth Buck Run (Little Muncy Creek tributary) (the United States)

Physical characteristics
- Source
  - location: Jordan Township, Lycoming County, Pennsylvania, near Pennsylvania Route 239, at the base of Huckleberry Mountain
  - elevation: 1,352 ft (412 m)
- Mouth
  - location: Little Muncy Creek in Jordan Township, Lycoming County, Pennsylvania near Biggerstown
  - coordinates: 41°15′26″N 76°30′17″W
  - elevation: 1,089 ft (332 m)
- Length: 1.3 mi (2.1 km)
- Basin size: 0.81 mi^{2} (2.1 km^{2})

Basin features
- Progression: Little Muncy Creek → Muncy Creek → West Branch Susquehanna River → Susquehanna River → Chesapeake Bay
- Tributaries
  - right: one unnamed tributary

Buck Run is a tributary of Little Muncy Creek in Lycoming County, Pennsylvania, in the United States. It is approximately 1.3 miles (2.1 km) long and flows through Jordan Township. The watershed of the stream has an area of 0.81 square miles (2.1 km^{2}). The surficial geology near the stream mostly consists of Illinoian Till and Illinoian Lag, with some alluvium and bedrock. The stream is a Coldwater Fishery and is being considered for wild trout designation. It has one unnamed tributary.

== Course ==
Buck Run begins in Jordan Township, near Pennsylvania Route 239, at the base of Huckleberry Mountain. It flows south for a short distance before entering a valley, where it continues to flow south for approximately a mile. The stream then receives a very short unnamed tributary from the right and reaches its confluence with Little Muncy Creek.

Buck Run joins Little Muncy Creek 21.16 miles (34.05 km) upstream of its mouth.

=== Tributaries ===
Buck Run has no named tributaries. However, it does have an unnamed tributary that flows several hundred feet from a pond to join Buck Run.

== Geography and geology ==
The elevation near the mouth of Buck Run is 1,089 feet (332 m) above sea level. The elevation of the stream's source is 1,352 feet (412 m) above sea level.

The surficial geology at the mouth of Buck Run consists of alluvium. However, most of the stream's valley has surficial geology featuring Illinoian Till and Illinoian Lag. The thickness of the latter ranges from 6 feet (1.8 m) to less than 30 feet (9.1 m). The sides of the stream's valley have surficial geology consisting of sandstone and shale.

Buck Run is slightly beyond the terminus of the glaciers during the Wisconsinan Glaciation.

== Watershed ==
The watershed of Buck Run has an area of 0.81 square miles (2.1 km^{2}). The stream is entirely within the United States Geological Survey quadrangle of Sonestown. Its mouth is located near Biggerstown.

A pipeline crosses Buck Run in its lower reaches.

== History ==
Buck Run was entered into the Geographic Names Information System on August 2, 1979. Its identifier in the Geographic Names Information System is 1170543.

== Biology ==
Buck Run is being considered for wild trout designation by the Pennsylvania Fish and Boat Commission. The stream was surveyed on July 2, 2013 and listed on the Pennsylvania Fish and Boat Commission website as being considered for wild trout designation on January 20, 2015.

Like all of the tributaries of Little Muncy Creek, Buck Run is classified as a Coldwater Fishery.

== See also ==
- West Branch Little Muncy Creek, next tributary of Little Muncy Creek going downstream
- List of rivers of Pennsylvania
