= Wolf Run (Muncy Creek tributary) =

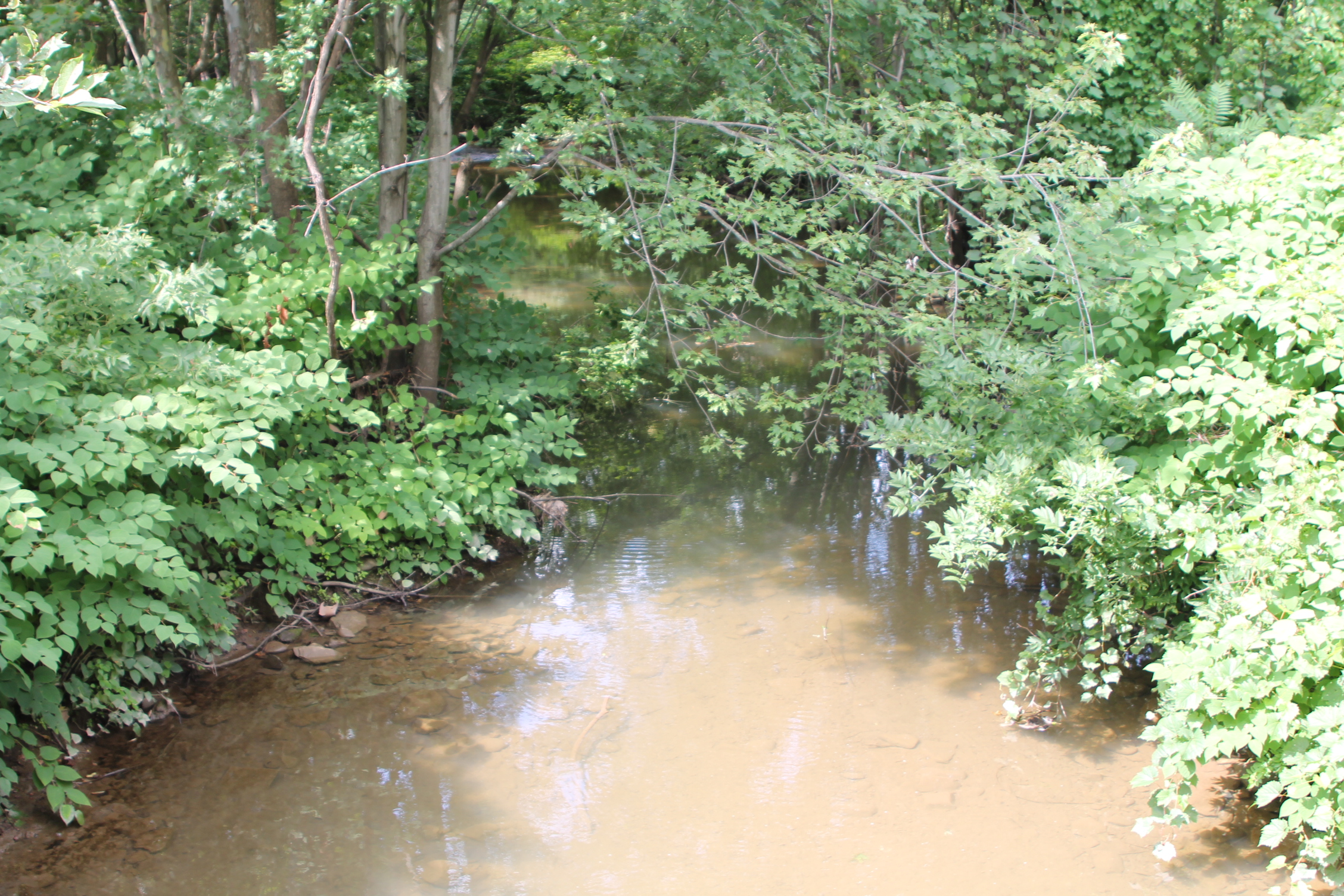

Physical characteristics
- Source
  - location: western Wolf Township, Lycoming County, Pennsylvania
- Mouth
  - location: Muncy Creek in Muncy Creek Township, Lycoming County, Pennsylvania
  - coordinates: 41°12′40″N 76°48′08″W
- Length: 7.6 mi (12.2 km)
- Basin size: 11.1 sq mi (29 km^{2})

Basin features
- Progression: Muncy Creek → West Branch Susquehanna River → Susquehanna River → Chesapeake Bay
- Tributaries
  - right: Oak Run

Wolf Run is a tributary of Muncy Creek in Lycoming County, Pennsylvania, in the United States. It is 7.6 miles (12.2 km) in length. The stream flows through Wolf Township, Muncy Township, and Muncy Creek Township. The stream's watershed has an area of 10.8 square miles. Slightly over two million pounds of sediment flow through the stream every year. A fort existed near Wolf Run for several hundred years until the late 1800s or early 1900s. At least three bridges cross the stream.

== Course ==
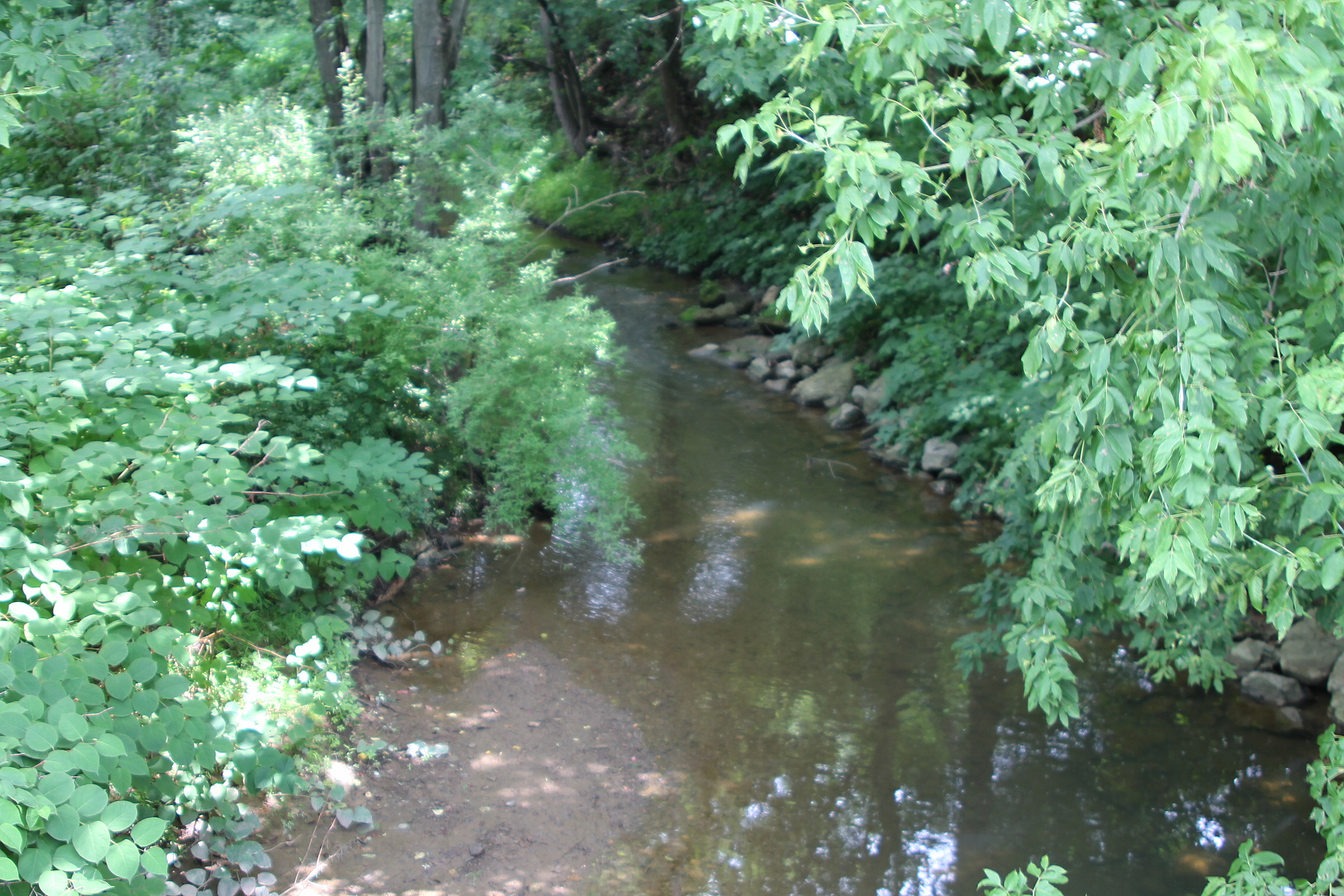
Wolf Run looking downstream

Wolf Run begins near the western border of Wolf Township, between Roundtop and Long Hill. It flows southwards inside a valley and turns southeast after some distance and then turns south again. In the southern part of Wolf Township, the stream leaves the valley, flows under U.S. Route 220, and turns southwest, exiting Wolf Township and entering Muncy Township. It gradually turns west and passes near the community of Pennsdale before turning south. Near the border of the township, the stream crosses under Interstate 180 and enters Muncy Creek Township. The stream turns west and then south again to parallel the West Branch Susquehanna River. Near the borough of Muncy, it reaches its confluence with Muncy Creek, very near to Muncy Creek's confluence with the West Branch Susquehanna River.

Wolf Run joins Muncy Creek 0.06 miles (0.097 km) upstream of its mouth.

== Hydrology ==
Wolf Run experiences siltation and also experiences stream bank erosion.

The annual load of sediment flowing through Wolf Run is 2,166,200 pounds (982,600 kg). A load of 1,362,400 pounds (618,000 kg) of sediment per year comes from croplands, 503,000 pounds (228,000 kg) comes from stream banks, 116,800 pounds (53,000 kg) comes from forests, and 115,400 pounds (52,300 kg) comes from hay or pastures. 49,000 pounds (22,000 kg) per year comes from what is classified by the Pennsylvania Department of Environmental Protection as "low-intensity development" and 16,800 pounds (7,600 kg) per year comes from what is classified by the Pennsylvania Department of Environmental Protection as "transition". A sediment load of 2,800 pounds (1,300 kg) per year comes from the watershed's coal mines and none comes from the watershed's wetlands.

== Geology and geography ==
The lowest parts of the Wolf Run watershed are approximately 500 feet (150 m) above sea level. The highest parts of the watershed are approximately 1,400 feet (430 m) above sea level.

The entire watershed is in the ridge and valley geographic region.

Of the rock in the Wolf Run watershed, 50 percent is interbedded sedimentary rock, 30 percent is sandstone, 15 percent is shale, and 5 percent consists of carbonate rocks.

== Watershed ==
The Wolf Run watershed has an area of 11.1 square miles (29 km^{2}) and a total of 20.7 miles (33.3 km) of streams. 63.1 percent of the watershed is forested land and 27.7 percent is agricultural land. 8.5 percent is considered "low-intensity development" by the Pennsylvania Department of Environmental Protection, 0.5 percent is occupied by coal mines, and 0.1 percent is occupied by wetlands.

== History ==
A fortification made of earth known as the "Ancient Fortification" was built at least several hundred years ago on Wolf Run, less than 0.2 miles (0.32 km) north of Muncy Creek. John Franklin Meginness stated in the late 1800s that it was under 300 to 500 years old. The fortification was square and situated in an east-to-west alignment. It enclosed about an acre of land. It had been the subject of much discussion in the early 20th century. It had already been deserted for a long period of time and was in a state of decay when Conrad Weiser reached the area on March 21, 1737. The historian John Franklin Meginness has stated that it is possible that Étienne Brûlé, a Frenchman, visited an area near Wolf Run as early as 1615, but this is not certain.

The Genesee Road, which was opened in the early 1800s and ran from Muncy to the Genesee River, passed by Wolf Run. A stone gristmill was once built on the stream by William Ellis. In the 1800s or early 1900s, a railroad was built near Wolf Run and it passed over the Ancient Fortification. During the construction of the railroad at this location, several artifacts, including a piece of Indian pottery, were found. Charcoal and other evidence of ancient fires were also found near Wolf Run during the construction of the railroad. In the late 1800s, the Cogan House school was located on Wolf Run.

Wolf Run is named for the relatively large number of wolves that historically lived near the stream.

In 2013, Lycoming County rehabilitated the U.S. Route 220 bridge over Wolf Run at a cost of $770,000. Two other bridges over the stream were repaired in the same year for a cost of slightly over $1 million each.

== Biology ==
Wolf Run has been designated a High-Quality Coldwater Fishery and a Migratory Fishery. Parts of the stream do not have a riparian buffer. In a book dated to 1909, Edward A. Straub wrote that there were large catfish and eels lived in Wolf Run.

A white oak tree with a trunk circumference of over 26 feet (7.9 m) historically grew near Wolf Run, on the Adlum Farm. It was cut down in 1852.

== See also ==
- Little Muncy Creek, next tributary of Muncy Creek going upstream
- List of rivers of Pennsylvania
