= Penn Township, Lycoming County, Pennsylvania =

Township in Pennsylvania, US

- Township
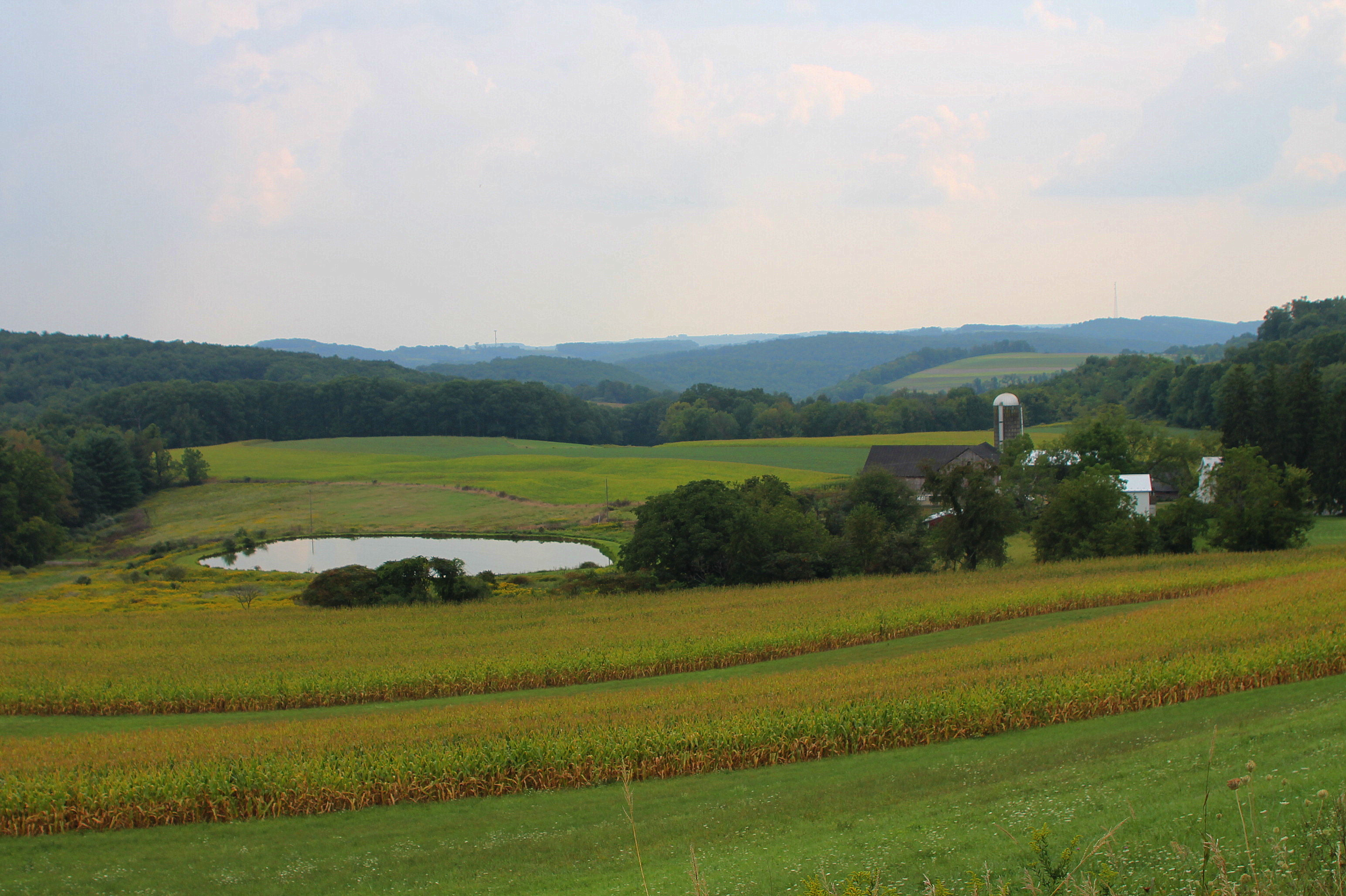
- Scenery of Penn Township

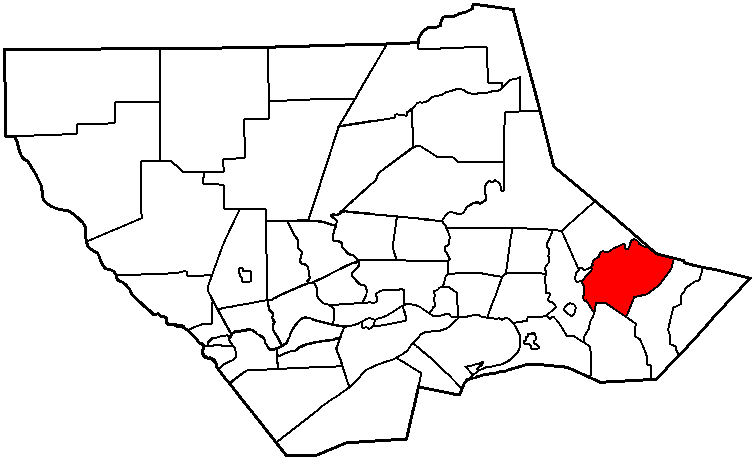
- Map of Lycoming County, Pennsylvania highlighting Penn Township

- Map of Lycoming County, Pennsylvania
- Coordinates: 41°16′48″N 76°38′37″W
- Country: United States
- State: Pennsylvania
- County: Lycoming
- Settled: 1774
- Incorporated: 1828

Area
  - Total: 26.59 sq mi (68.86 km^{2})
  - Land: 26.28 sq mi (68.07 km^{2})
  - Water: 0.31 sq mi (0.80 km^{2})
- Elevation: 823 ft (251 m)

Population (2020)
  - Total: 892 ▼
  - Estimate (2021): 896
  - Density: 37/sq mi (14.4/km^{2})
- Time zone: UTC-5 (Eastern (EST))
  - Summer (DST): UTC-4 (EDT)
- FIPS code: 42-081-58848
- GNIS feature ID: 1216767

Penn Township is a township in Lycoming County, Pennsylvania, United States. The population was 892 at the 2020 census. It is part of the Williamsport Metropolitan Statistical Area.

== History ==
Penn Township was formed in 1828 when Muncy Township was divided for the fourth time. It is named for Penn Township in Berks County, which in turn is named for William Penn, the founder of Pennsylvania. Tobias and Isaac Kepner had migrated to eastern Lycoming County from Berks County and wanted their new home to have the same name as their old home. Much of the history of Penn Township can be found in the history of the Big Runaway and Muncy Township. Lumbering was the dominant industry in Penn Township during the mid-to-late 19th century. A man-made lake, Beaver Lake, was built to supply water power for a sawmill. The sawmill has long since disappeared but the lake remains.

== Geography ==
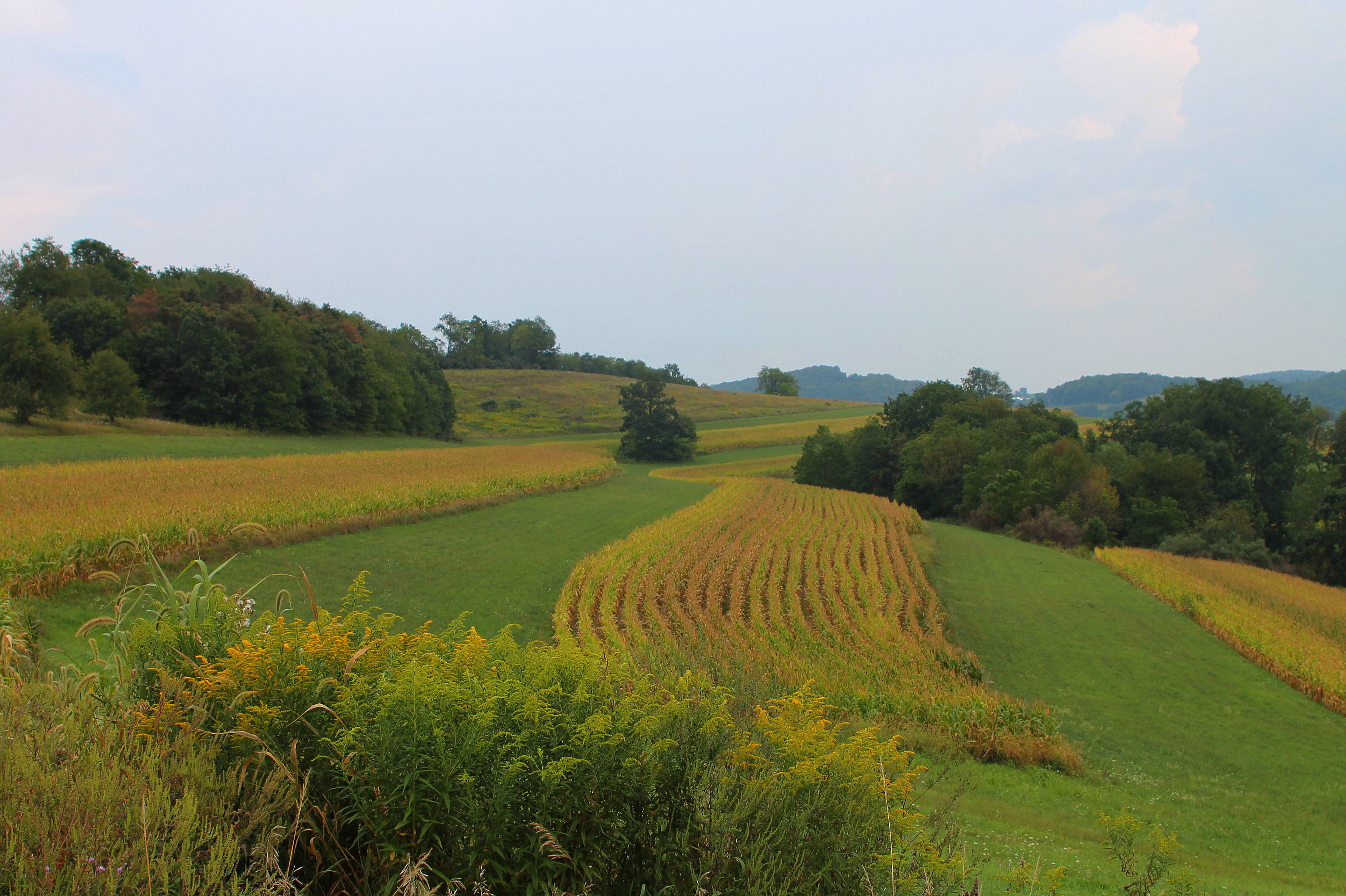
Scenery of Penn Township, Lycoming County, Pennsylvania

Penn Township is in southeastern Lycoming County and is bordered by Sullivan County to the northeast, Franklin Township to the southeast, Moreland Township to the south, Wolf Township and the borough of Picture Rocks to the west, and Shrewsbury Township to the northwest, across Muncy Creek. U.S. Route 220 crosses the northernmost part of the township in the Muncy Creek valley, leading northeast to Towanda and southwest to Hughesville and Williamsport, the Lycoming county seat. The unincorporated community of Strawbridge is in the northern part of the township along US-220, and the community of Beaver Lake is in the east, next to the lake of the same name.

According to the United States Census Bureau, Penn Township has a total area of 26.6 square miles (68.9 km^{2}), of which 26.3 square miles (68.1 km^{2}) are land and 0.3 square miles (0.8 km^{2}), or 1.16%, are water. The northern and western parts of the township drain to Muncy Creek, which forms the northern border of the township and flows southwestward to the West Branch Susquehanna River near Muncy. The southern and eastern parts of the township, including Beaver Lake, drain south into Franklin Township to Little Muncy Creek, a tributary of Muncy Creek.

== Demographics ==
Historical population
Census	Pop.	Note	%±
2010	960		—
2020	892		−7.1%
2021 (est.)	896		0.4%
U.S. Decennial Census

As of the census of 2000, there were 900 people, 349 households, and 263 families residing in the township. The population density was 33.9 inhabitants per square mile (13.1/km^{2}). There were 420 housing units at an average density of 15.8/square mile (6.1/km^{2}). The racial makeup of the township was 98.89% White, 0.44% Asian, and 0.67% from two or more races.

There were 349 households, out of which 33.0% had children under the age of 18 living with them, 67.6% were married couples living together, 3.7% had a female householder with no husband present, and 24.4% were non-families. 20.6% of all households were made up of individuals, and 7.7% had someone living alone who was 65 years of age or older. The average household size was 2.58 and the average family size was 3.01.

In the township the population was spread out, with 25.9% under the age of 18, 4.6% from 18 to 24, 29.4% from 25 to 44, 27.3% from 45 to 64, and 12.8% who were 65 years of age or older. The median age was 39 years. For every 100 females there were 112.3 males. For every 100 females age 18 and over, there were 109.1 males.

The median income for a household in the township was $40,735, and the median income for a family was $46,797. Males had a median income of $28,421 versus $22,000 for females. The per capita income for the township was $16,346. About 5.0% of families and 6.9% of the population were below the poverty line, including 8.1% of those under age 18 and 6.4% of those age 65 or over.
