= Lairdsville, Pennsylvania =

Unincorporated community in Pennsylvania, US

- Unincorporated community
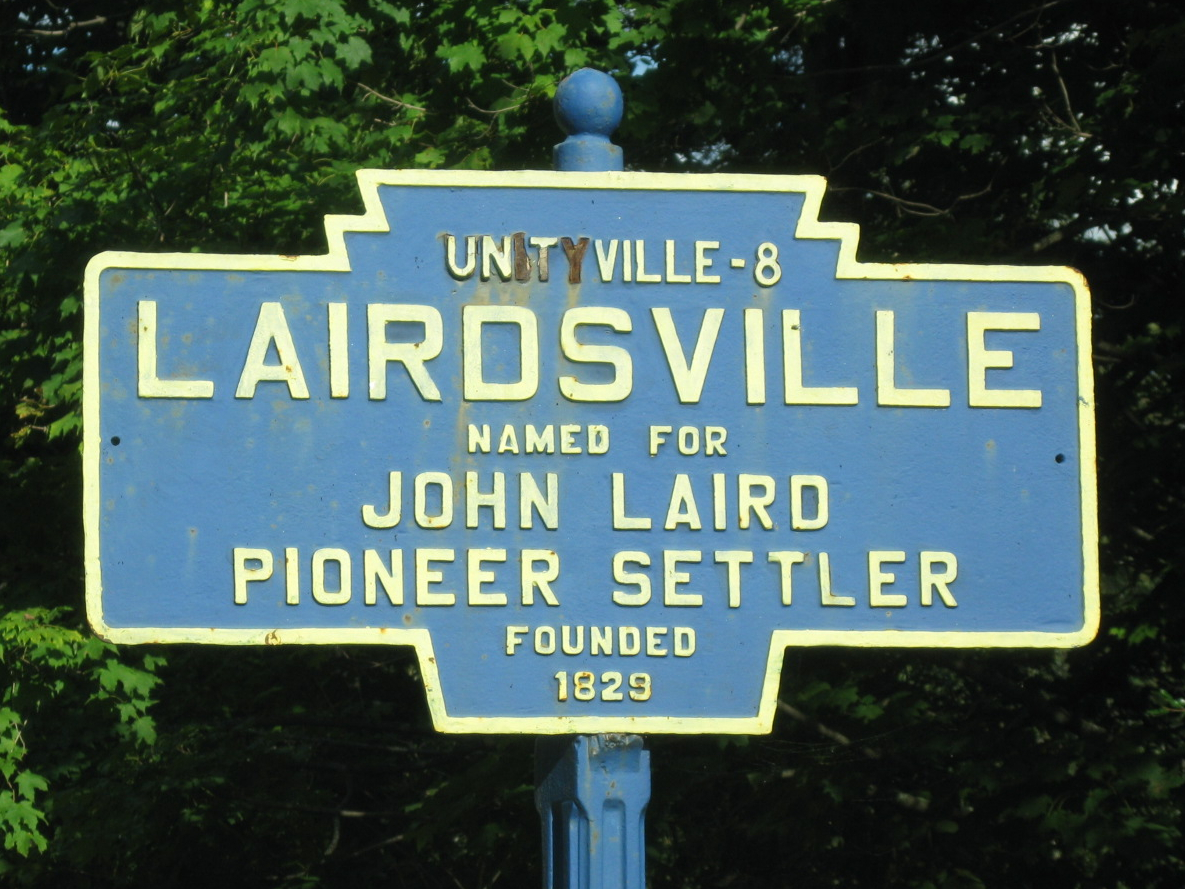
- Keystone marker

- Location within Pennsylvania Location within the United States
- Country: United States
- State: Pennsylvania
- County: Lycoming
- Township: Franklin
- Elevation: 1,014 ft (309 m)
- Time zone: UTC-5 (Eastern (EST))
  - Summer (DST): UTC-4 (EDT)
- ZIP code: 17742
- Area codes: 272 and 570

Lairdsville is an unincorporated community in Franklin Township, Lycoming County, Pennsylvania, United States.
