= Franklin Township, Lycoming County, Pennsylvania =

Township in Pennsylvania, US

- Township
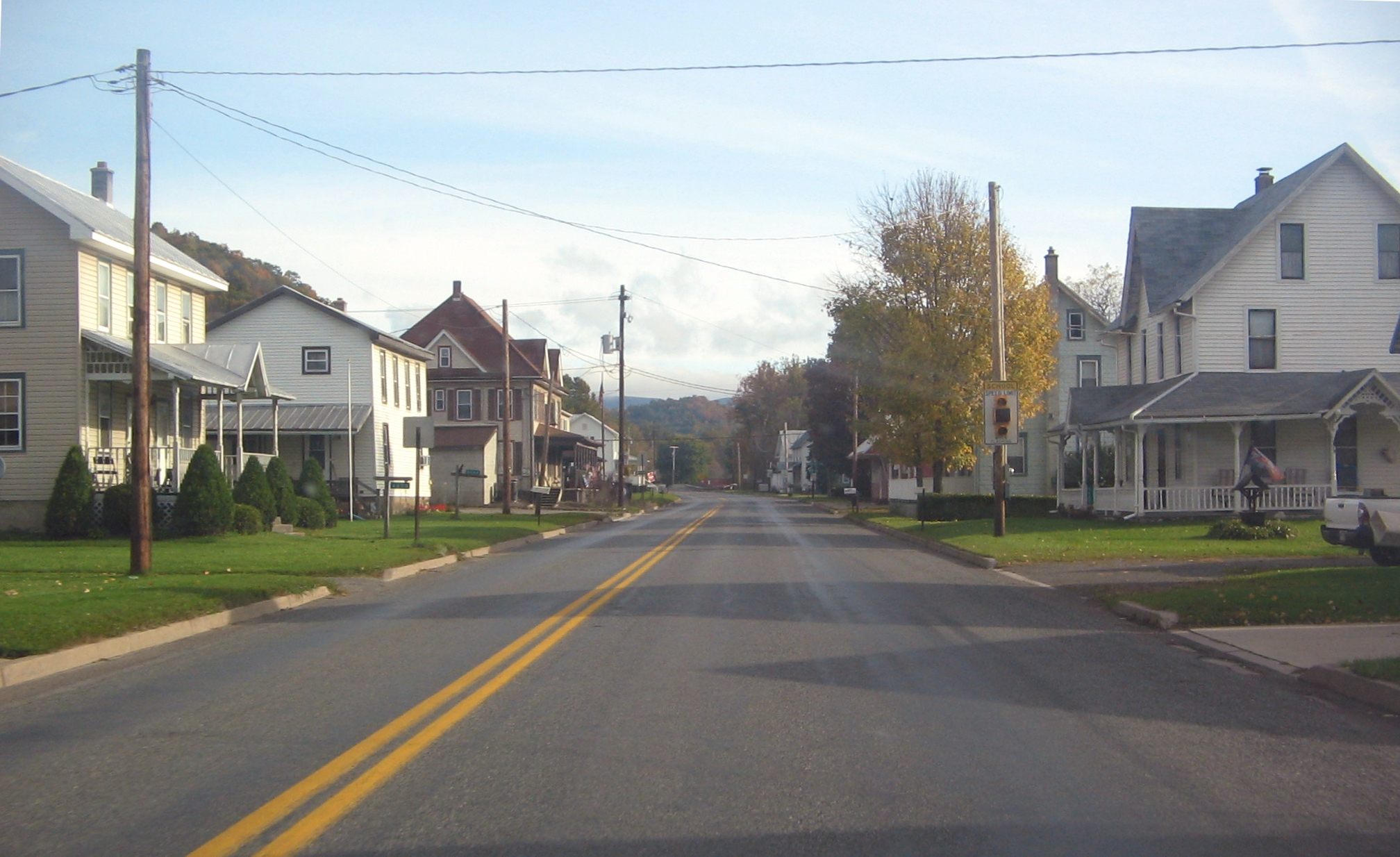
- Lairdsville, the township's main population center

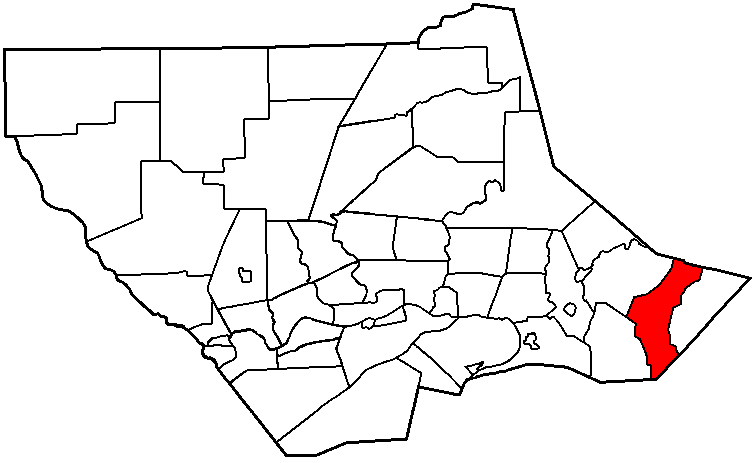
- Map of Lycoming County, Pennsylvania highlighting Franklin Township

- Map of Lycoming County, Pennsylvania
- Coordinates: 41°12′59″N 76°35′30″W
- Country: United States
- State: Pennsylvania
- County: Lycoming
- Settled: 1772
- Incorporated: 1822

Area
  - Total: 24.05 sq mi (62.28 km^{2})
  - Land: 23.91 sq mi (61.93 km^{2})
  - Water: 0.14 sq mi (0.35 km^{2})
- Elevation: 912 ft (278 m)

Population (2020)
  - Total: 901 ▼
  - Estimate (2021): 893
  - Density: 40/sq mi (15.4/km^{2})
- Time zone: UTC-5 (Eastern (EST))
  - Summer (DST): UTC-4 (EDT)
- FIPS code: 42-081-27432
- GNIS feature ID: 1216749
- Website: https://franklintwplycco.com/

Franklin Township is a township in Lycoming County, Pennsylvania, United States. The population was 901 at the 2020 census. It is part of the Williamsport Metropolitan Statistical Area.

== History ==
Franklin Township, named for Benjamin Franklin, was formed from part of Moreland Township in 1822. It included what is now Jordan Township until that was formed 32 years later. Another portion of Franklin Township was cut away in 1828 to form Penn Township.

The earliest settlers to Franklin Township were farmers. They arrived in the early 19th century and cleared the hills and valleys. Many of the farms established by these early settlers are still thriving today. Other important business ventures in Franklin Township included a large tannery on Little Muncy Creek just south of Lairdsville and the lumber industry which swept throughout north central Pennsylvania during the mid-to-late 19th century. Thousands of acres of old-growth forests were stripped to the ground. The logs were floated down the streams to one of the many sawmills that were spread along the banks of Little Muncy Creek. Today the forests of Franklin Township have regrown, providing an excellent habitat for white-tailed deer, black bear and turkey.

Enos Hawley, born in Chester County, was one of the first citizens in Lycoming County publicly to state an opposition to slavery. He was a member of the Religious Society of Friends. The Quakers were firmly against slavery and were noted for the assistance they provided the abolitionist movement in the years preceding the Civil War. Hawley was raised in Franklin Township in the vicinity of Lairdsville, which is the only village in the township. Hawley went on to serve as postmaster in the nearby borough of Muncy.

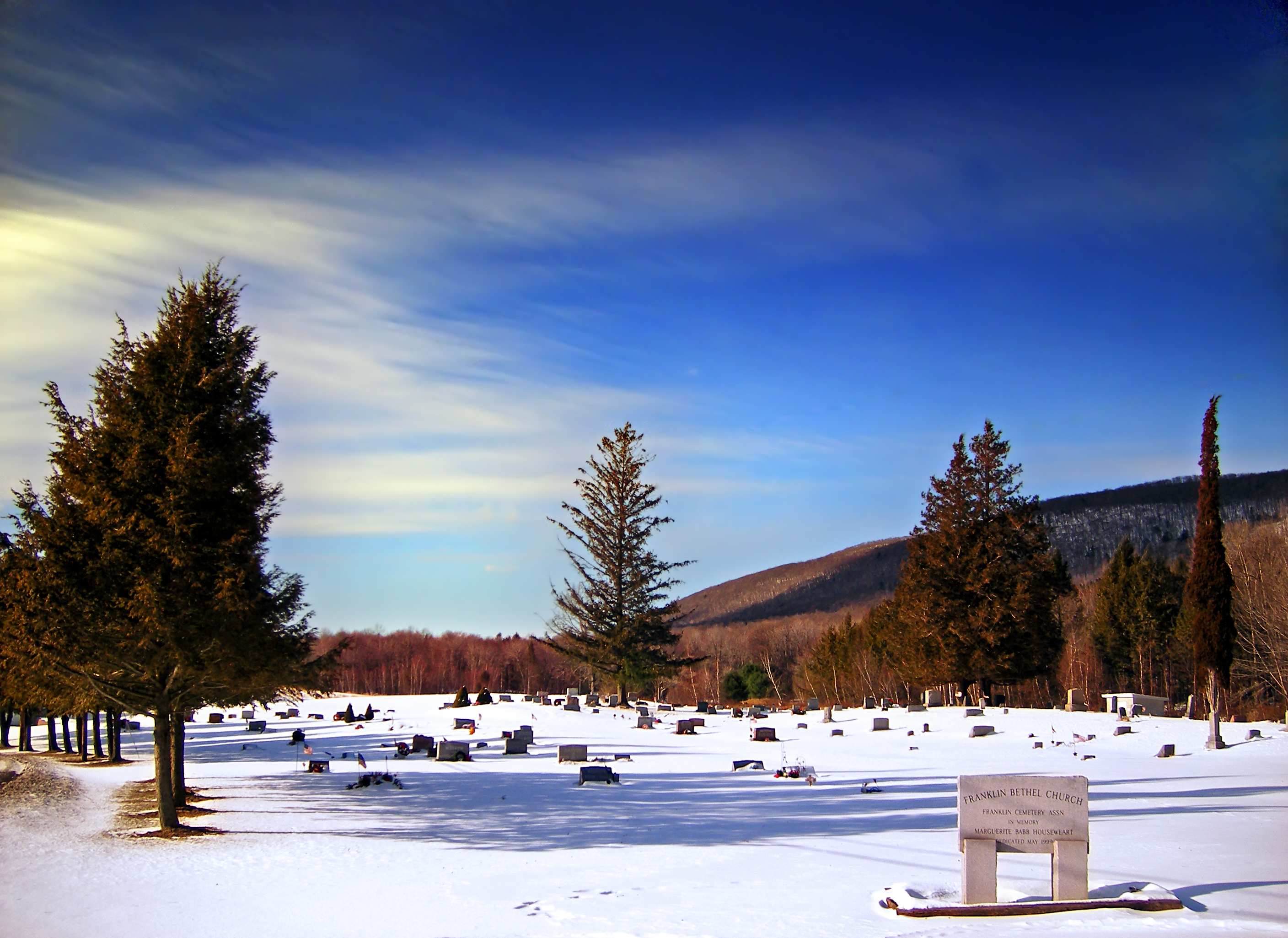
A cemetery in Franklin Township

== Geography ==
Franklin Township is in southeastern Lycoming County and is bordered by Sullivan County to the north, Jordan Township to the east, Montour County to the south, Moreland Township to the southwest, and Penn Township to the northwest. Lairdsville is in the center of the township, along Pennsylvania Route 118, which leads west 7 miles (11 km) to Hughesville and east-northeast 37 miles (60 km) to Dallas. Williamsport, the Lycoming county seat, is 23 miles (37 km) west of Franklin Township via PA 118 and U.S. Route 220.

According to the United States Census Bureau, the township has a total area of 24.1 square miles (62.3 km^{2}), of which 23.9 square miles (61.9 km^{2}) are land and 0.1 square miles (0.3 km^{2}), or 0.56%, are water. The township is drained by Little Muncy Creek and its tributaries, flowing west to Muncy Creek and then the West Branch Susquehanna River near the borough of Muncy.

== Demographics ==
Historical population
Census	Pop.	Note	%±
2010	933		—
2020	901		−3.4%
2021 (est.)	893		−0.9%
U.S. Decennial Census

As of the census of 2000, there were 915 people, 346 households, and 271 families residing in the township. The population density was 37.4 inhabitants per square mile (14.4/km^{2}). There were 396 housing units at an average density of 16.2/sq mi (6.3/km^{2}). The racial makeup of the township was 99.56% White, 0.11% African American, 0.22% Native American, and 0.11% from two or more races.

There were 346 households, out of which 31.5% had children under the age of 18 living with them, 67.1% were married couples living together, 7.2% had a female householder with no husband present, and 21.4% were non-families. 17.6% of all households were made up of individuals, and 6.4% had someone living alone who was 65 years of age or older. The average household size was 2.64 and the average family size was 2.98.

In the township the population was spread out, with 23.5% under the age of 18, 8.5% from 18 to 24, 29.2% from 25 to 44, 27.2% from 45 to 64, and 11.6% who were 65 years of age or older. The median age was 38 years. For every 100 females there were 104.2 males. For every 100 females age 18 and over, there were 101.7 males.

The median income for a household in the township was $37,500, and the median income for a family was $43,250. Males had a median income of $29,231 versus $21,523 for females. The per capita income for the township was $16,584. About 5.1% of families and 8.7% of the population were below the poverty line, including 10.0% of those under age 18 and 8.4% of those age 65 or over.
