= Muncy Creek =

Creek in Pennsylvania, United States

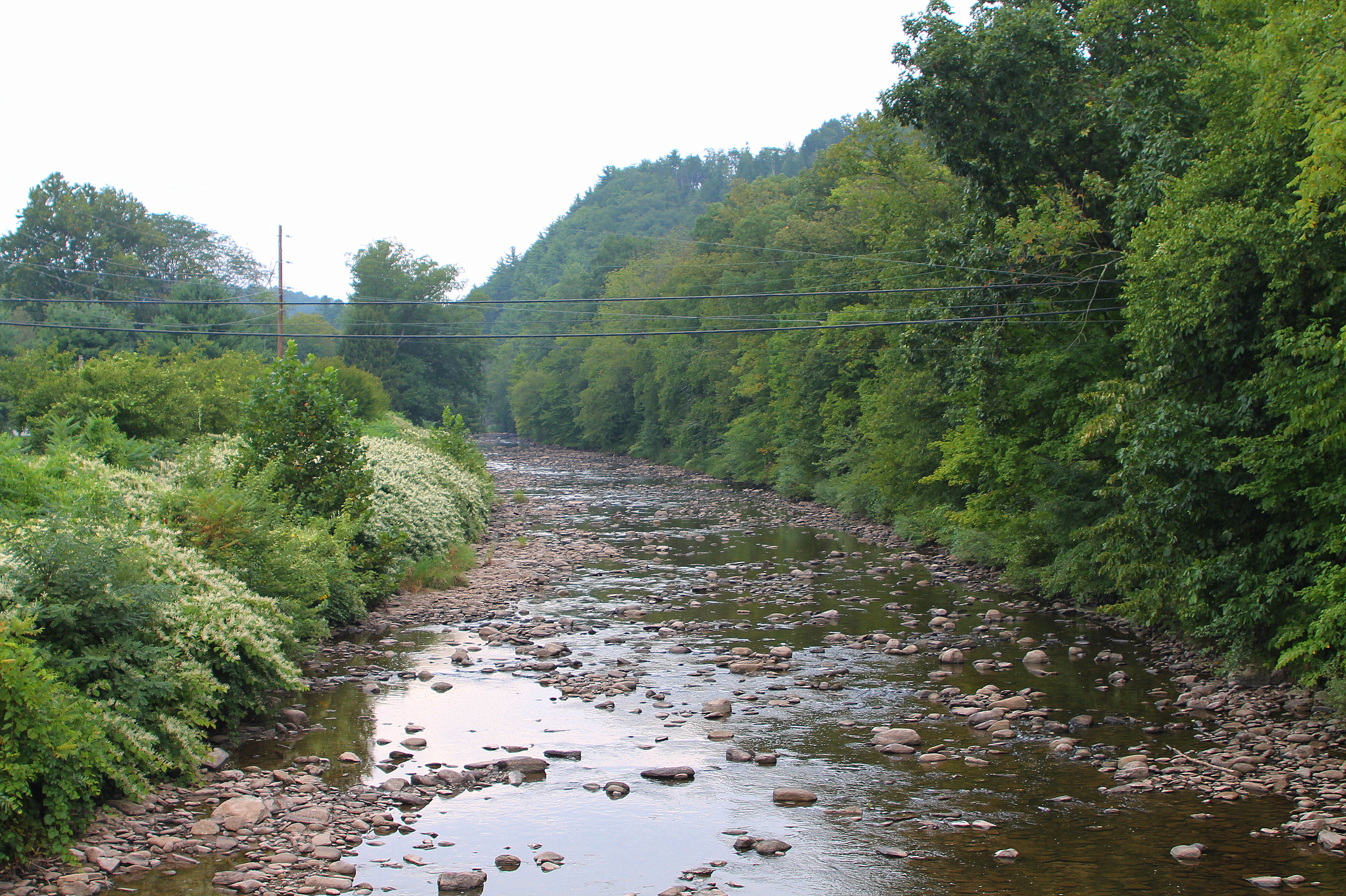
- Muncy Creek looking upstream in Picture Rocks
- Native name: Occohpocheny

Physical characteristics
- Source
  - location: southeastern Laporte Township, Sullivan County, Pennsylvania
  - elevation: 2,260 to 2,280 feet (688.8 to 694.9 m)
- Mouth
  - location: West Branch Susquehanna River in Muncy Creek Township, Lycoming County, Pennsylvania
  - coordinates: 41°12′35″N 76°48′12″W
  - elevation: slightly less than 480 feet (150 m)
- Length: 35.8 mi (57.6 km)
- Basin size: 216 mi^{2} (560 km^{2})
- Discharge
  - average: 44.9 cu ft/s (1.27 m^{3}/s)

Basin features
- Tributaries
  - left: Little Muncy Creek
  - right: Wolf Run

Muncy Creek (also known as Big Muncy Creek) is a tributary of the West Branch Susquehanna River in Sullivan County and Lycoming County, in Pennsylvania, United States. It is approximately 34.5 miles (55.5 km) long. The watershed of the creek has an area of 216 square miles (560 km^{2}). The creek's discharge averages 49 cubic feet per second (1.4 m^{3}/s) at Sonestown, but can be up to a thousand times higher at Muncy. The headwaters of the creek are on the Allegheny Plateau. Rock formations in the watershed include the Chemung Formation and the Catskill Formation.

There are a number of lakes in the watershed of Muncy Creek, including Eagles Mere Lake, Highland Lake, and Beaver Lake. The creek was known as Occohpocheny to Native Americans. The area in its vicinity was settled in 1783. Various other industries and mills were constructed in the creek's vicinity from the late 18th century to the early 20th century. Wild trout naturally reproduce in part of Muncy Creek. Part of the creek is navigable by canoe.

== Course ==
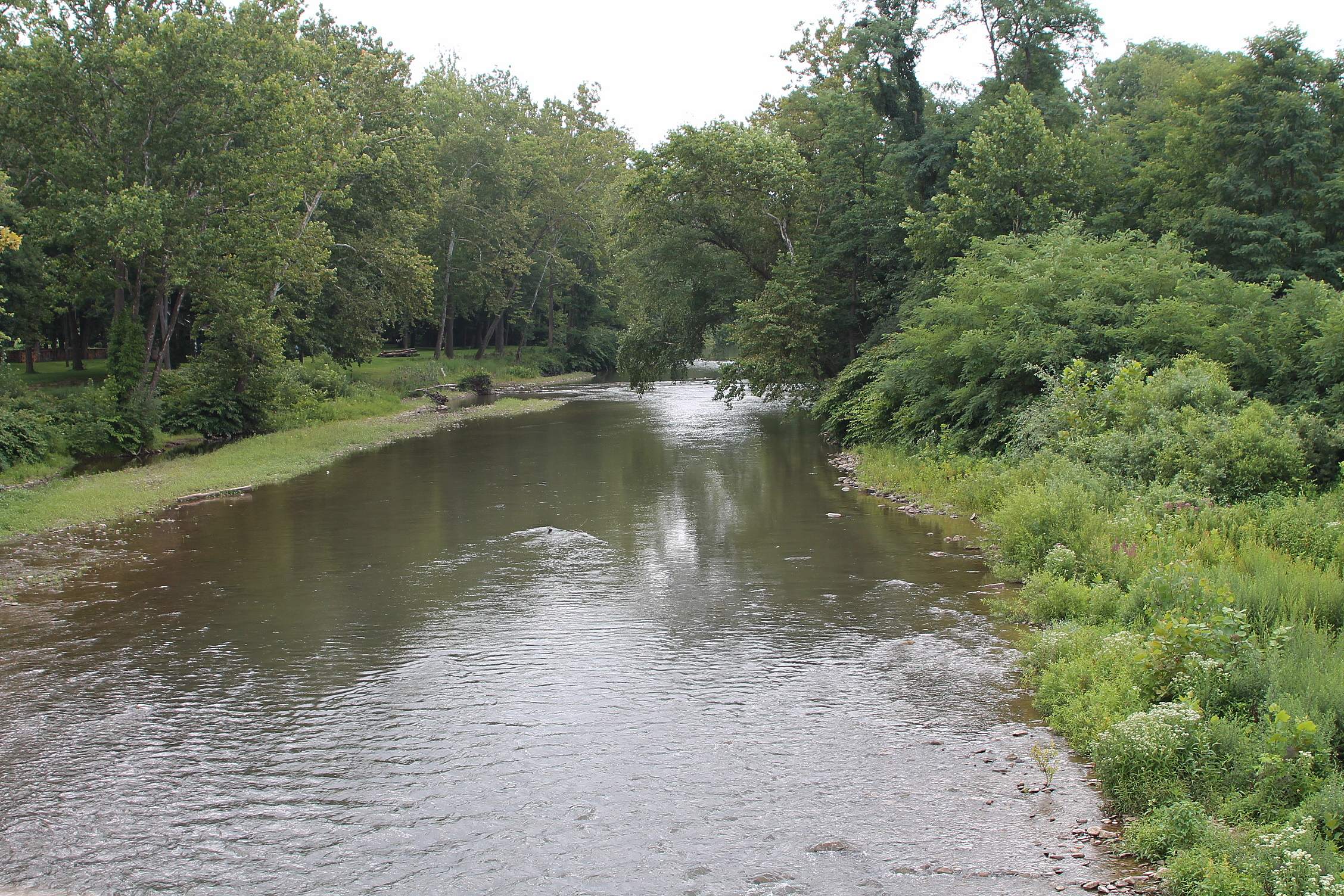
Muncy Creek in Muncy Creek Township

Muncy Creek begins in southeastern Laporte Township, Sullivan County, near its border with Davidson Township, Sullivan County. The creek flows southwest and then west for a short distance before reaching the border between Laporte Township and Davidson Township. It then turns southwest as it begins to follow this border. Shortly afterwards it turns northwest and begins to flow into a valley, then turns west and begins receiving very short tributaries from both sides. Examples of these include Rock Run and Lopez Pond Branch. After picking up Peters Creek, one such tributary, Muncy Creek turns southwest and passes the community of Nordmont, where the tributary Elklick Run flows into it. The creek then turns southwest and later west. Deep Hollow Run then enters the creek, which heads south away from the Laporte Township/Davidson Township border. Upon leaving behind the Laporte Township/Davidson Township border, the creek enters Davidson Township and heads west-southwest, passing a gauging station. After several miles, it reaches the community of Sonestown, where the tributary Big Run flows into it from the north. Muncy Creek then makes a sharp bend south and begins flowing parallel to U.S. Route 220. After a few miles, it passes the community of Muncy Valley and makes a sharp turn south, exiting Davidson Township.

Upon exiting Davidson Township, Sullivan County, Muncy Creek enters Lycoming County and flows along the border between Shrewsbury Township and Penn Township for several miles. It continues following U.S. Route 220 during this time, picking up a few tributaries, including Lick Run. The creek also passes by Glen Mawr and Tivoli during this stretch. Beyond the stretch, in Picture Rocks, the creek crosses Pennsylvania Route 864. Beyond the community, the creek continues south into Wolf Township, leaving its valley passing by the eastern edge of Hughesville. Some distance further on, the creek receives the tributary Sugar Run and some miles later leaves Wolf Township in a southwesterly direction. Upon exiting Wolf Township, the creek enters Muncy Creek Township, where Little Muncy Creek flows into it. Muncy Creek then turns northeast, crossing Pennsylvania Route 405 and turns southwest, crossing Interstate 180. The creek then receives the tributary Wolf Run and immediately afterwards empties into the West Branch Susquehanna River. Muncy Creek joins the West Branch Susquehanna River is 27.88 miles (44.87 km) upstream of its mouth.

=== Tributaries ===
Significant tributaries of Muncy Creek include Little Muncy Creek and Wolf Run. The watershed of Little Muncy Creek has an area of 82.30 square miles (213.2 km^{2}). This creek reaches its confluence with Muncy Creek 3.90 miles (6.28 km) upstream of its mouth. The watershed of Wolf Run has an area of 11.10 square miles (28.7 km^{2}). This stream reaches its confluence with Muncy Creek 0.06 miles (0.097 km) upstream of its mouth. Other large tributaries of the creek include Lewis Creek, Rock Run, and Sugar Run. The watersheds of these tributaries have areas of 14.5 square miles (38 km^{2}), 10.3 square miles (27 km^{2}), and 10.3 square miles (27 km^{2}), respectively. Muncy Creek also has numerous minor tributaries.

== Hydrology ==
The highest recorded discharge of Muncy Creek near Muncy is 46,600 cubic feet (1,320 m^{3}) per second. In 2012 and 2013, the creek's discharge at this location ranged from 29 to 379 cubic feet (0.82 to 10.73 m^{3}) per second. The discharge of the creek at Sonestown averages 44.9 cubic feet per second. The osmotic pressure of the stream's waters at this location ranged from less than 1 up to 4 millios-moles per 2.2 pounds (1.00 kg). The annual rate of precipitation near the creek ranges from 35 to 50 inches (89 to 127 cm).

The pH of Muncy Creek's waters near Muncy ranged from 7.0 to 7.5 in 2012 and 2013. The stream's specific conductance ranged from 89 to 134 micro-siemens per centimeter at 25 °C (77 °F).

Between November 2012 and September 2013, the lowest recorded water temperatures of Muncy Creek at Muncy were 1.4 °C (34.5 °F) on January 9, 2013 and 2.6 °C (36.7 °F) on March 19, 2013. The highest recorded water temperatures were 20.6 °C (69.1 °F) and 20.4 °C (68.7 °F), on September 4, 2013 and July 9, 2013, respectively.

The concentration of dissolved solids in Muncy Creek ranges from 50 to 80 milligrams per liter (1.8×10^{−6} to 2.9×10^{−6} lb/cu in). The concentration of suspended solids, however, is always less than 5 milligrams per liter (1.8×10^{−7} lb/cu in). The water hardness of the creek (in terms of the concentration of calcium carbonate) ranges from 28 to 49 milligrams per liter (1.0×10^{−6} to 1.8×10^{−6} lb/cu in). The concentration of calcium in the creek ranges from 8.7 to 10.5 milligrams per liter (3.1×10^{−7} to 3.8×10^{−7} lb/cu in). Its magnesium concentration can be as low as 1.6 milligrams per liter (5.8×10^{−8} lb/cu in) or as high as 2.0 milligrams per liter (7.2×10^{−8} lb/cu in), while its sodium concentration ranges from 3.2 to 4.1 milligrams per liter (1.2×10^{−7} to 1.5×10^{−7} lb/cu in).

There are trace amounts of bromides, phosphorus, orthophosphates, and ammonia in Muncy Creek. All of these occur in concentrations of 0.3 milligrams per liter or less. Nitrites occur in concentrations of less than 0.4 milligrams per liter (1.4×10^{−8} lb/cu in). The chloride concentration in the creek ranges from 4.5 to 7.0 milligrams per liter (1.6×10^{−7} to 2.5×10^{−7} lb/cu in). The minimum sulfate concentration is 6.7 milligrams per liter (2.4×10^{−7} lb/cu in) and the maximum is 8.9 milligrams per liter (3.2×10^{−7} lb/cu in) milligrams per liter. The minimum nitrate concentration is 0.65 milligrams per liter (2.3×10^{−8} lb/cu in) milligrams per liter and the maximum is 1.2 milligrams per liter (4.3×10^{−8} lb/cu in) milligrams per liter. The total concentration of nitrogen in the creek ranges from 0.8 to 1.2 milligrams per liter (2.9×10^{−8} to 4.3×10^{−8} lb/cu in).

The concentration of aluminum in Muncy Creek ranges from less than 20 micrograms per liter (0.0014 gr/imp gal) up to 30 micrograms per liter (0.0021 gr/imp gal) and the copper concentration is always less than 4 micrograms per liter (0.00028 gr/imp gal) micrograms per liter. The lead concentration is always less than 1 microgram per liter (7.0×10^{−5} gr/imp gal). In 2013, the creek's concentration of manganese was observed to be 20 micrograms per liter (0.0014 gr/imp gal). The zinc concentration ranges from less than 5 micrograms per liter (0.00035 gr/imp gal) up to 30 micrograms per liter (0.0021 gr/imp gal). The nickel and selenium concentrations are less than 4 and 7 micrograms per liter (0.00028 and 0.00049 gr/imp gal), respectively, while the boron concentration is less than 200 micrograms per liter (0.014 gr/imp gal). The creek's strontium concentration is 40 or 50 micrograms per liter (0.0028 or 0.0035 gr/imp gal).

== Geography and geology ==
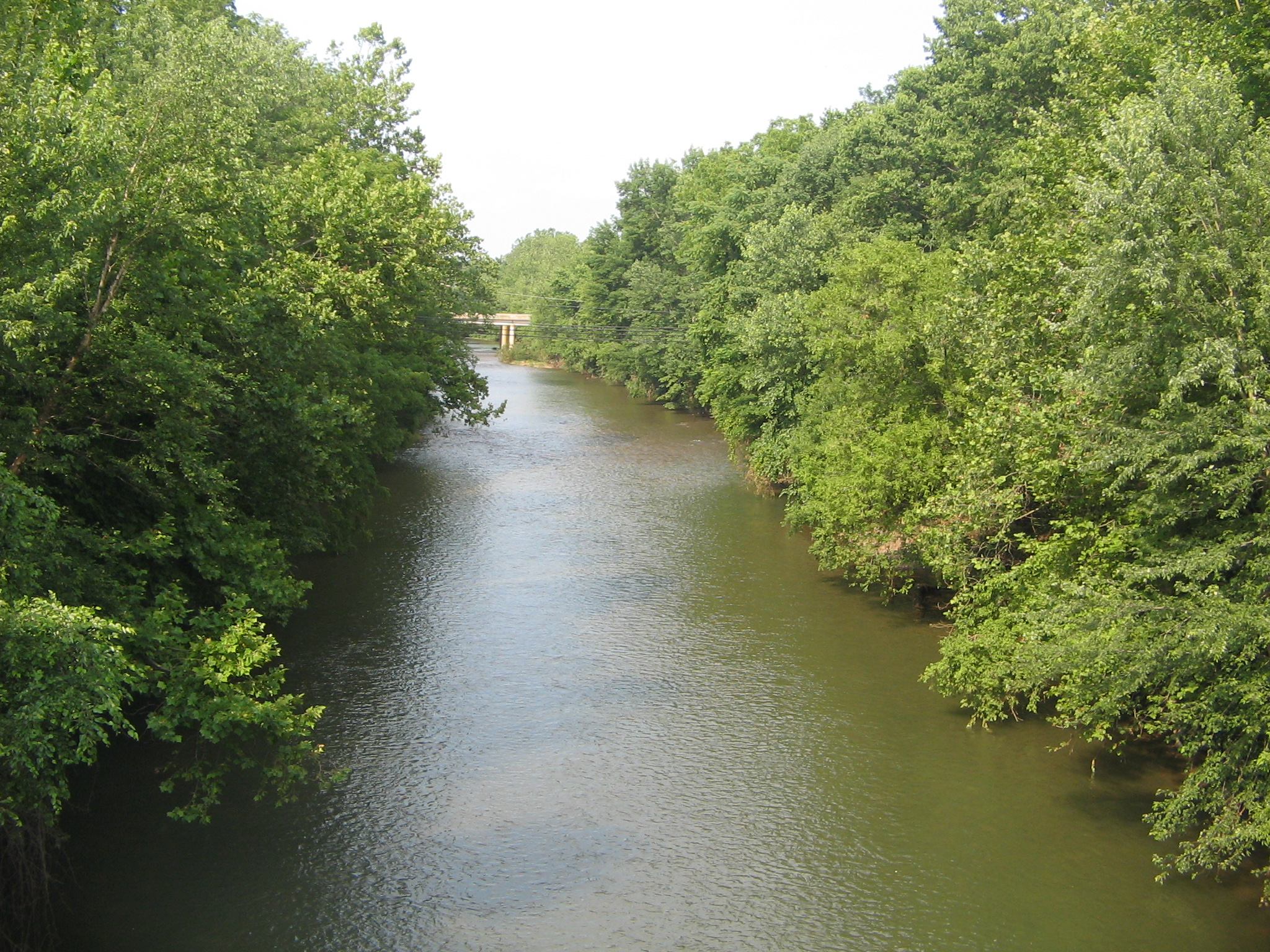
Muncy Creek near its mouth in Muncy Creek Township, Lycoming County, Pennsylvania

The mouth of Muncy Creek has an elevation of slightly less than 480 feet (150 m), while the source of the creek has an elevation of between 2,260 feet (690 m) and 2,280 feet (690 m). The headwaters of the creek are more than 1,500 feet (460 m) higher than its mouth. The headwaters of Muncy Creek are mountainous and are situated on the Allegheny Plateau. The southern edge of the Allegheny Mountain runs from the creek west as far as Lock Haven or Pine Creek. The valley of Muncy Creek is surrounded by scalloped hills. Muncy Creek's course winds significantly, but flows generally southwest.

A narrow belt of the Chemung Formation occurs along Muncy Creek in Shrewsbury Township, Lycoming County. An outcropping of the Catskill Formation also occurs along parts of the creek in Jordan Township, Lycoming County. The Chemung Formation has an outcropping on the creek near Moreland. This outcropping is 30 feet (9.1 m) high and gray in color. It consists of shale and sandstone. Red shale is also found on the creek. In general, rock formations consisting of sandstone and shale are found along much of the creek, while rock formations of limestone occur close to its mouth.

The Tombs Run and Muncy Creek Anticline runs parallel to the creek through northern Penn Township, Lycoming County and also enters Sullivan County near the creek. The creek also has a cliff known as Picture Rock on it. An area of boulders on the creek forms a Class 2 rapid. There is a levee on Muncy Creek in Hughesville.

The soils in the valley of Muncy Creek are deep but relatively poor. However, farming was done in the valley in the late 1800s and still is as of the late 1900s. The valley has forested hills on either side. The Morris-Oquaga-Wellsboro soil series is found along the creek in Sullivan County.

The channel of Muncy Creek is sinuous with high streambanks and the creek has cobble and gravel bars. There are a few strainers on the creek.

== Watershed ==
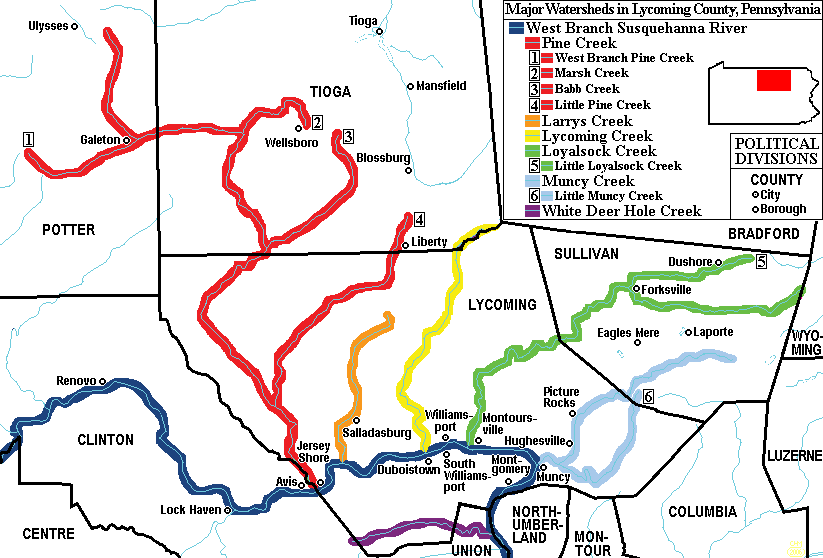
Map of the West Branch Susquehanna River (dark blue) and major streams in Lycoming County, Pennsylvania. Muncy Creek (light blue) is the fifth major creek to enter the river in the county, south of Loyalsock Creek (green). Little Muncy Creek is the shorter branch south of the longer main creek (and is labeled with a '6').

The watershed of Muncy Creek has an area of 216 square miles (560 km^{2}). The area of the watershed upstream of Hugesville comprises approximately half of the total watershed. The area of the creek's watershed upstream of Sonestown is 25.8 square miles (67 km^{2}). The watershed of the creek occupies parts of Lycoming County, Sullivan County, Columbia County, and Montour County.

There are a number of lakes in the watershed of Muncy Creek. The largest is Eagles Mere Lake, which has an area of 116.2 acres (47.0 ha). Hunters Lake has an area of 90.2 acres (36.5 ha) and Highland Lake has an area of 10 acres (4.0 ha). Additionally, Beaver Lake (which has an area of 6 acres (2.4 ha)) is located in the watershed of the tributary Little Muncy creek.

Communities in the watershed of Muncy Creek include Hugesville, Picture Rocks, Lairdsville, and Sonestown. Smaller communities in the creek's watershed include Muncy Valley, Eagles Mere, and Nordmont.

In the late 1800s, the only road in Davidson Township, Sullivan County besides the Susquehanna and Tioga Turnpike passed near Muncy Creek and the settlements along it. The valley of Muncy Creek is largely undeveloped, largely lacking even summer camps.

== History ==
Muncy Creek derives its name from the Munsee Indians. The name sometimes has been spelled "Muncey Creek".

Muncy Creek was known to the Native Americans as Occohpocheny. Historically, Native Americans painted on Picture Rock, a cliff on the creek. Additionally, six Native American lance heads made of stone were found near the creek by Joseph Fahrenbach in the autumn of 1872.

Muncy Creek was settled in 1783 by John Beeber. In 1797, the Willow Grove Mill was built on Muncy Creek in 1797 by Isaac Walton and by the late 1800s, there was a sawmill on the creek in Shrewsbury Township, Lycoming County. A woolen mill was also built on the creek in Wolf Township, Lycoming County in 1842. An aqueduct carrying the West Branch Canal once crossed Muncy Creek.

Historically, railroads ran parallel to Muncy Creek 26 miles (42 km) upstream from its mouth, as far as the community of Nordmont. There were also numerous railroad stations on the creek upstream from the community of Picture Rocks. The Reading Railroad also had a bridge over the creek in the past. The creek experienced severe flooding in 1889.

In the early 1900s, many of the sewers in the community of Eagles Mere discharged into tributaries of Muncy Creek, such as Outlet Run. Sewage was also discharged into Muncy Creek in Hugesville. Additionally, in the early 1900s, the waters of Muncy Creek were contaminated with tannery waste products from Muncy Valley and also chemicals. For this reason, the creek was only used for power during this time. Additionally, a methyl alcohol plant, the Nordmont Chemical Works, discharged chemicals into the creek at Nordstown. Other major industries in the watershed in the early part of the 1900s included clay mines and furniture factories.

== Biology ==
From its headwaters to a point 26.4 miles (42.5 km) upstream of its mouth, the drainage basin of Muncy Creek is designated as Exceptional Value and a Migratory Fishery. From this point downstream to the US Route 220 bridge at Muncy Valley, the creek's main stem is designated as a Coldwater Fishery and a Migratory Fishery. From this point downstream to its mouth, the main stem is designated as a Trout Stocked Fishery and a Migratory Fishery. Wild trout naturally reproduce in the creek from Trout Run downstream to its mouth.

A total of 92 percent of assessed streams in the watershed of Muncy Creek are inhabited by trout. Of the inhabited streams, 82 percent are inhabited only by brook trout, nine percent are inhabited by only brown trout, and nine percent are inhabited by both brook trout and brown trout. A number of tributaries of the creek are designated as high-quality coldwater fisheries. These include Lick Run, Roaring Run, Rock Run, and Spring Run in Lycoming County and Big Run, Trout Run, and a number of others in Sullivan County.

There are some forested areas in the floodplains of Muncy Creek in the United States Geological Survey quadrangle of Hughesville. The Natural Areas Inventory of Lycoming County recommended retaining the natural vegetation in this area to improve water quality.

== Recreation ==
It is possible to canoe on Muncy Creek during snowmelts or shortly after heavier rainstorms. Although the creek is used for canoeing by locals, it is less popular for this use than the nearby Loyalsock Creek. Edward Gertler considers the creek to be especially good for novice canoers. He describes Muncy Creek as a "pleasing but generally mediocre mountain stream" in his book Keystone Canoeing. However, it is only possible to canoe on the creek downstream of the plateau of North Mountain. A total of 24.3 miles (39.1 km) of the creek is canoeable. The difficulty rating of Muncy Creek for canoeing ranges from 1+ to 2.

There is a boat ramp belonging to the Pennsylvania Fish and Boat Commission in the lower reaches of Muncy Creek. It can also serve as a take-out for canoers on the creek.

== See also ==
- Chillisquaque Creek
- List of rivers of Pennsylvania
