= Little Muncy Creek =

Major tributary of Muncy Creek in Pennsylvania

Coordinates: 41°12′26″N 76°44′47″W

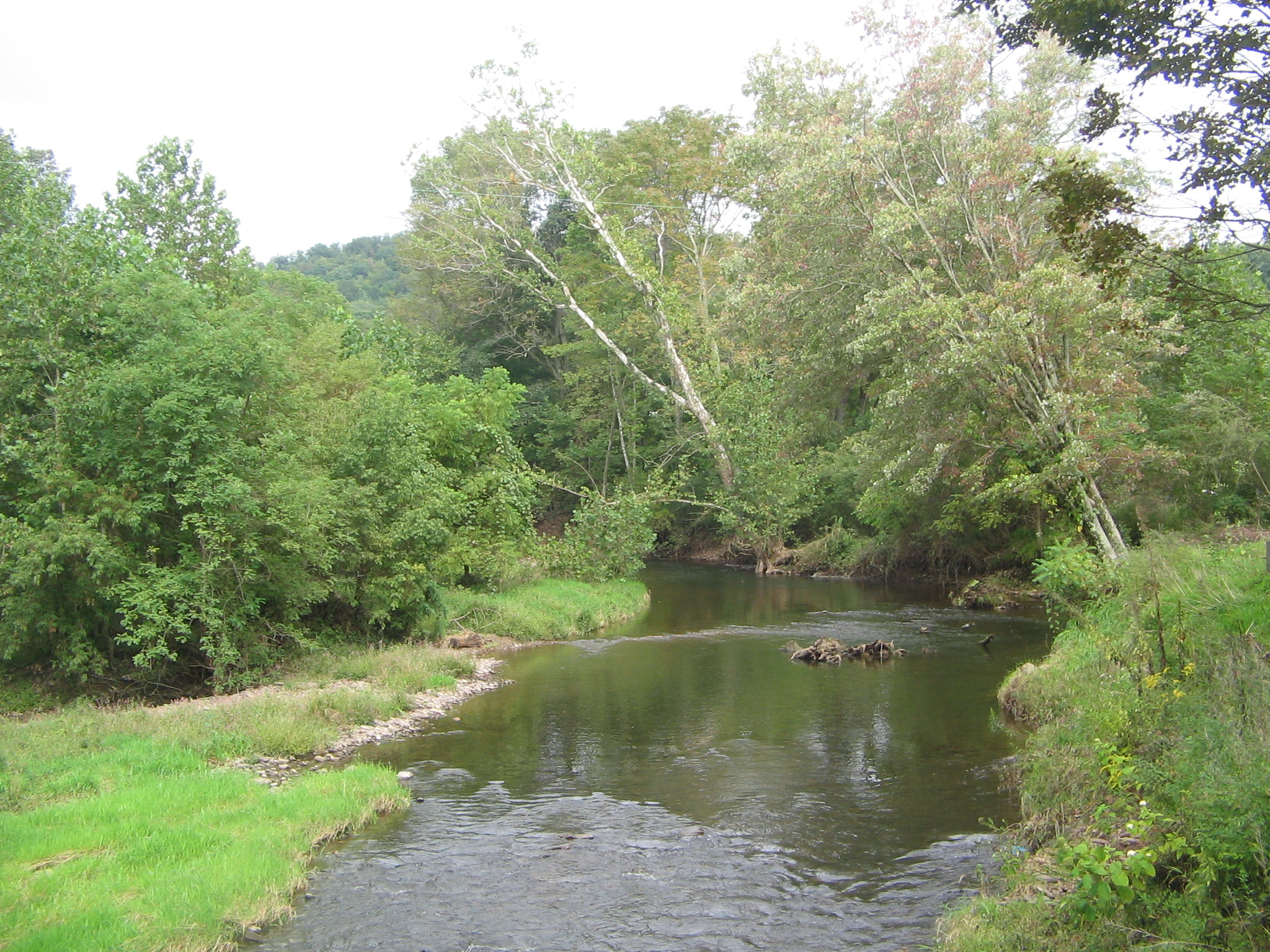
Little Muncy Creek looking upstream from the Covered Bridge over it in Moreland Township, Lycoming County.

Little Muncy Creek is the major tributary of Muncy Creek in Lycoming and Sullivan Counties, Pennsylvania, United States. Via Muncy Creek and the West Branch Susquehanna River, it is part of the Susquehanna River drainage basin and waters from it flow ultimately into the Chesapeake Bay.

== Course ==
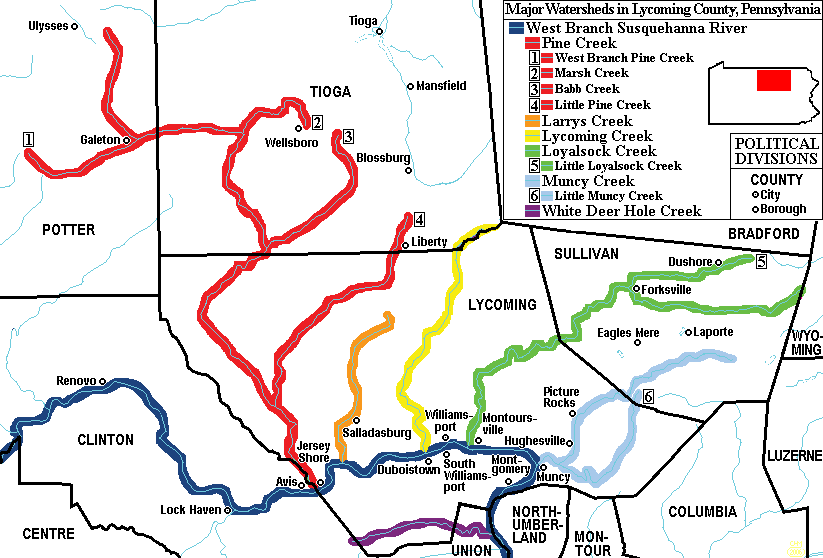
Map of the West Branch Susquehanna River (dark blue) and Major Streams in Lycoming County, Pennsylvania. Muncy Creek (light blue) is the fifth major creek to enter the river in the county, south of Loyalsock Creek (green). Little Muncy Creek is the shorter branch south of the longer main creek (and is labeled with a '6').

Little Muncy Creek has its source in Davidson Township in Sullivan County, then flows south in Jordan Township in Lycoming County. It then flows west into Franklin Township and the village of Lairdsville, running parallel to Pennsylvania Route 118 here. Further west it enters Moreland Township and passes the village of Opp, before entering Muncy Creek Township, where it flows into Muncy Creek just west of the village of Clarkstown. Other streams feeding Little Muncy Creek include Marsh Run, Beaver Run, Laurel Run, Big Run, German Run, and Little Indian Run.

== Watershed ==
The Little Muncy Creek watershed has a total area of 82 sq mi (210 km^{2}) and a total population of 3,735 (as of 2000). Approximately 87.4% of the Little Muncy Creek watershed is in Lycoming County, 5.7% is in Columbia County, 5.3% is in Sullivan County, and 1.5% is in Montour County. Of that area, 48 sq mi (120 km^{2}) are forested and 34 sq mi (88 km^{2}) are given to agricultural uses.

== See also ==
- List of rivers of Pennsylvania
- Wolf Run (Muncy Creek)
