= Cox Run =

River in Pennsylvania, United States

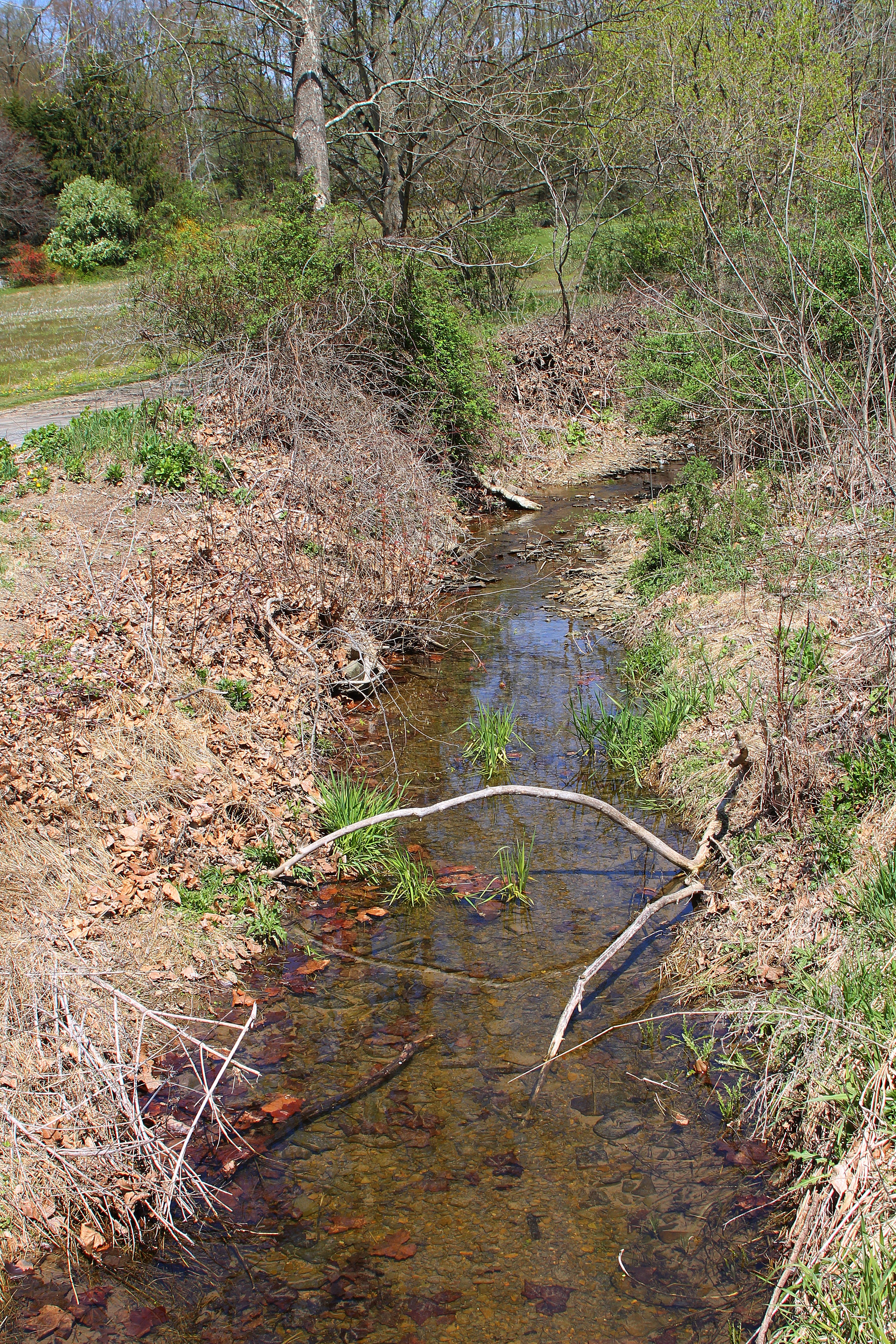
- Cox Run looking upstream

Physical characteristics
- Source
  - location: valley to the east of Buck Hill in Moreland Township, Lycoming County, Pennsylvania
  - elevation: 997 ft (304 m)
- Mouth
  - location: Little Muncy Creek in Muncy Creek Township, Lycoming County, Pennsylvania near Clarketown
  - coordinates: 41°11′34″N 76°43′07″W
  - elevation: 538 ft (164 m)
- Length: 2.3 mi (3.7 km)
- Basin size: 1.20 mi^{2} (3.1 km^{2})

Basin features
- Progression: Little Muncy Creek → Muncy Creek → West Branch Susquehanna River → Chesapeake Bay
- Tributaries
  - left: two unnamed tributaries

Cox Run is a tributary of Little Muncy Creek in Lycoming County, Pennsylvania, in the United States. It is approximately 2.3 miles (3.7 km) long and flows through Moreland Township, Wolf Township, and Muncy Creek Township. The watershed of the stream has an area of 1.20 square miles (3.1 km^{2}). Cox Run itself flows through a valley known as Neufer Hollow and is designated as a Coldwater Fishery. A streambank stabilization project along the stream was proposed in 2008.

== Course ==
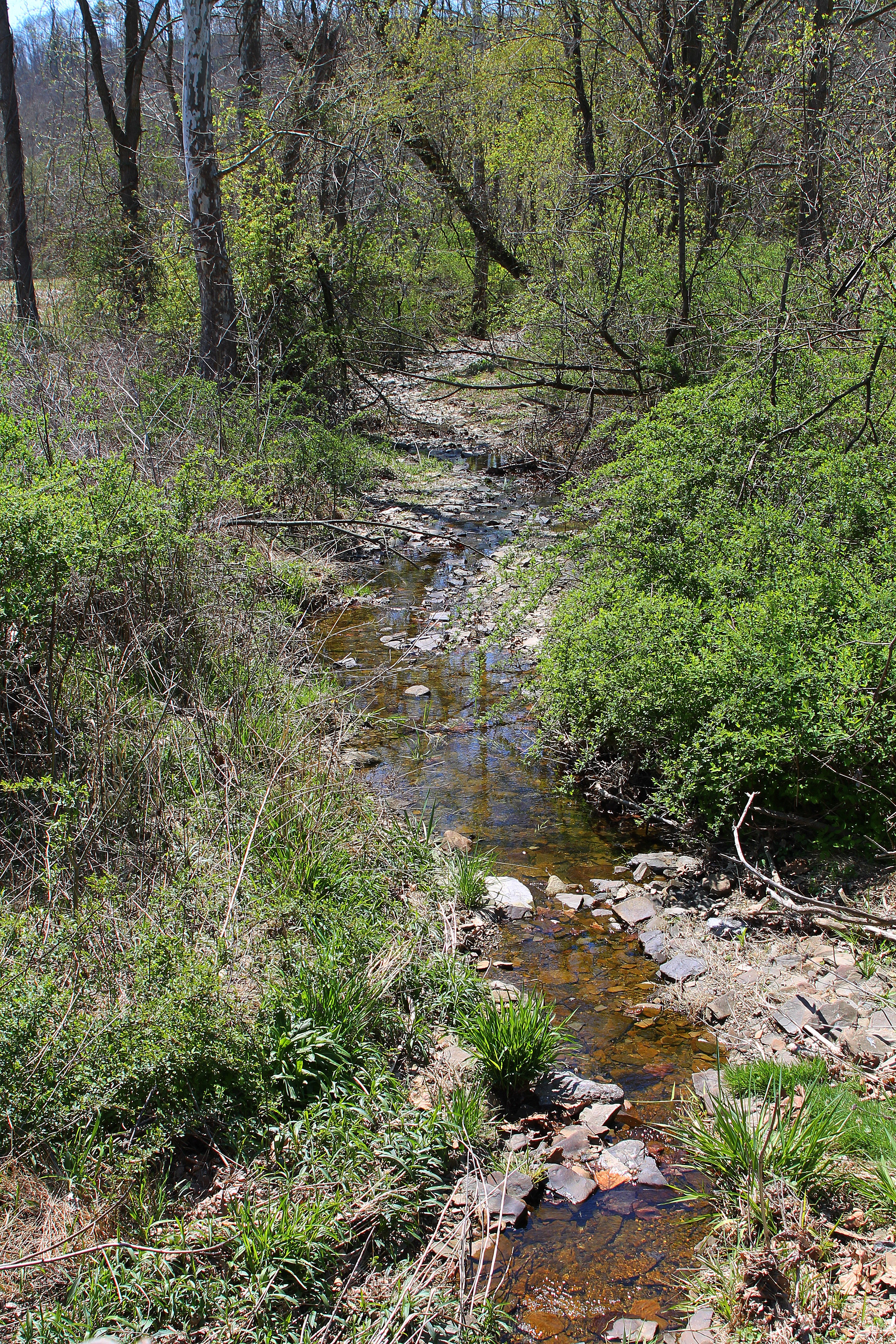
Cox Run looking downstream

Cox Run begins in a valley to the east of Buck Hill in Moreland Township. It flows south for a few tenths of a mile before turning south-southwest, still flowing through its valley alongside Buck Hill. The stream then receives an unnamed tributary from the left before turning southwest for more than a mile. In this reach it flows between Buck Hill and Tommy Hill and receives another unnamed tributary from the left, passing through Wolf Township, and entering Muncy Creek Township. It eventually reaches the end of its valley and turns south-southwest, crossing Pennsylvania Route 442. After a few tenths of a mile, the stream reaches its confluence with Little Muncy Creek.

Cox Run joins Little Muncy Creek 1.96 miles (3.15 km) upstream of its mouth.

=== Tributaries ===
Cox Run has no named tributaries. However, it does have two unnamed tributaries. The upper tributary is approximately 0.4 miles (0.64 km) long and the lower one is approximately 0.1 miles (0.16 km) long.

== Geography and geology ==
The elevation near the mouth of Cox Run is 538 feet (164 m) above sea level. The elevation of the stream's source is 997 feet (304 m) above sea level. The stream flows through a valley known as Neufer Hollow.

== Watershed and biology ==
The watershed of Cox Run has an area of 1.20 square miles (3.1 km^{2}). The stream is entirely within the United States Geological Survey quadrangle of Hugesville. Its mouth is located within 1 mile (1.6 km) of Clarketown.

Cox Run is classified as a Coldwater Fishery, like all of the other tributaries of Little Muncy Creek.

== History ==
Cox Run was entered into the Geographic Names Information System on August 2, 1979. Its identifier in the Geographic Names Information System is 1172564.

In 2008, Engineering District 3-0 of the Pennsylvania Department of Transportation applied for permission to carry out a bank stabilization project on Cox Run. The proposed project would stabilize approximately 593 feet (181 m) of embankment alongside State Route 2063 in Moreland Township, Wolf Township, and Muncy Creek Township, 1 mile (1.6 km) east of Clarketown. The project was intended to have no significant impact on the stream.

== See also ==
- Shepman Run, next tributary of Little Muncy Creek going upstream
- List of rivers of Pennsylvania
