= Interstate 180 (Pennsylvania) =

Highway in Pennsylvania

Interstate 180
- I-180 highlighted in red

Route information
- Auxiliary route of I-80
- Maintained by PennDOT
- Length: 28.84 mi (46.41 km)
- Existed: January 1984–present
- NHS: Entire route

Major junctions
- West end: I-99 / US 15 / US 220 in Williamsport
- US 15 in Williamsport; PA 87 in Montoursville; US 220 near Pennsdale; PA 405 near Muncy
- East end: I-80 / PA 147 near Milton

Location
- Country: United States
- State: Pennsylvania
- Counties: Lycoming, Northumberland

Highway system
- Interstate Highway System; Main; Auxiliary; Suffixed; Business; Future; Pennsylvania State Route System; Interstate; US; State; Scenic; Legislative
← PA 179	→ PA 180

Interstate 180 (I-180) is a spur highway in Pennsylvania that connects Williamsport to I-80 near Milton. The length of the highway is 28.84 miles (46.41 km). It was also the designation of present-day I-176 between Morgantown and Reading, when the Pennsylvania Turnpike carried the "I-80S" designation in the 1960s. It is signed as an east–west route for its entire length, even though half of the route runs north–south.

== Route description ==
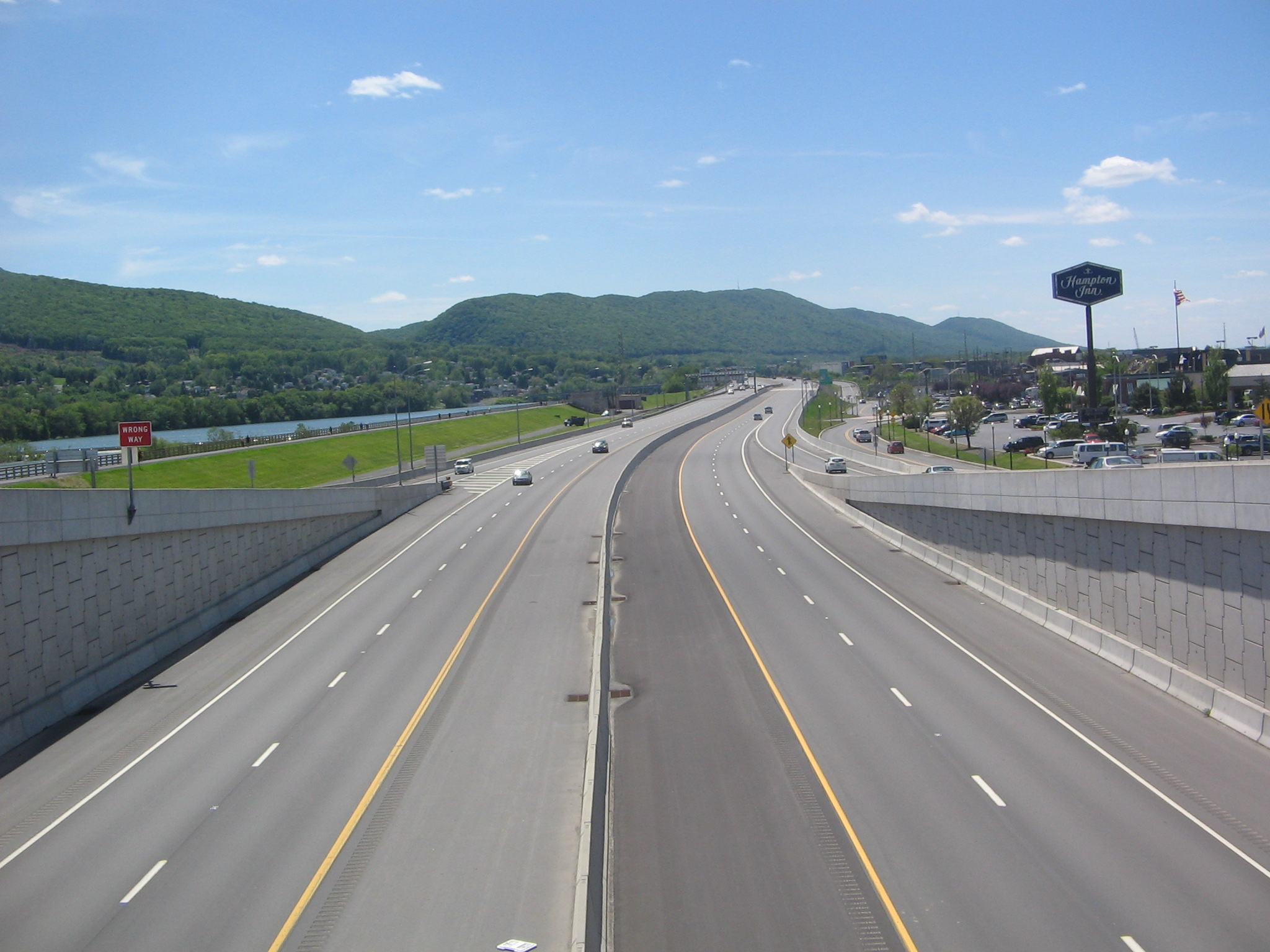
Looking west from the Carl E. Stotz Memorial Little League Bridge in Williamsport

I-180 begins along the banks of the West Branch Susquehanna River in Williamsport, at an interchange with I-99, U.S. Route 15 (US 15), and US 220. The highway begins running concurrently along US 15 and US 220.

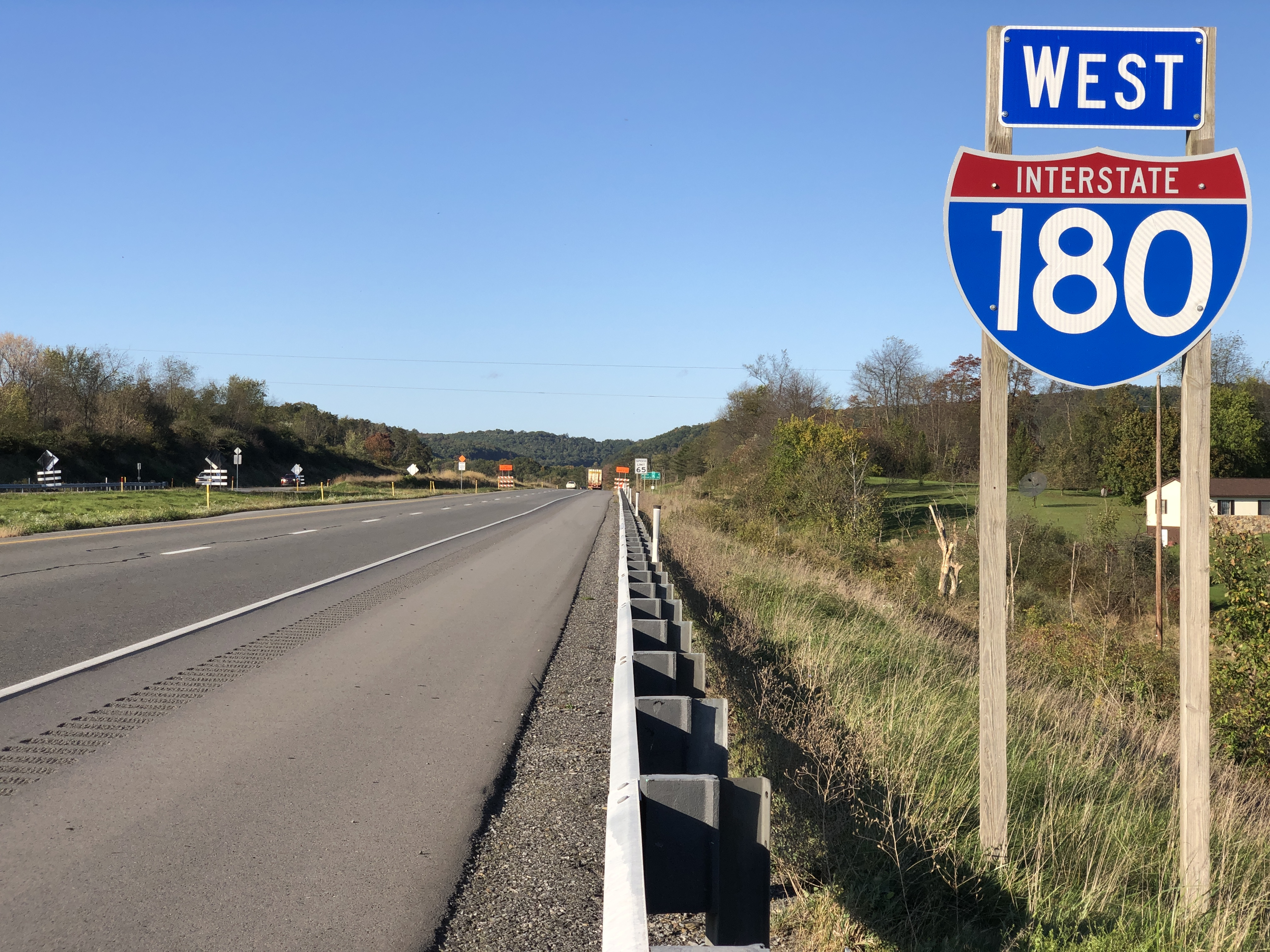
I-180 westbound just west of PA 54 in Delaware Township

At exit 27A, US 15 leaves the overlap running south across the Carl E. Stotz Memorial Little League Bridge, and I-180 continues eastward, still concurrent with US 220 northbound. From there, I-180 runs along the West Branch Susquehanna River until the highway reaches the eastern suburbs of Williamsport, where US 220 leaves the Interstate via exit 15.

From I-99/US 220 to the eastern terminus, I-180 is aligned north–south, though the highway is signed east–west. I-180 terminates at an interchange with I-80, and the freeway continues as Pennsylvania Route 147 (PA 147).

== History ==
I-180 was designated in January 1984 and was signed concurrently with US 220 between US 15 in Williamsport and Pennsdale and replaced PA 147 between US 220 in Pennsdale and I-80 near Milton.

== Exit list ==
County	Location	mi	km	Exit	Destinations	Notes
Lycoming	Williamsport	28.84	46.41	–	Future I-99 south / US 220 south – Lock Haven	Continuation south; western end of US 220 concurrency
Lycoming	Williamsport	28.84	46.41	29	I-99 north / US 15 north – Mansfield	Western end of US 15 concurrency; current southern terminus of I-99
Lycoming	Williamsport	27.9	44.9	28	Maynard Street	Access to Williamsport Hospital and Pennsylvania College of Technology
Lycoming	Williamsport	27.7	44.6	27B	Hepburn Street	Eastbound exit and westbound entrance
Lycoming	Williamsport	26.8	43.1	27A	US 15 south (Market Street) – Lewisburg	Eastern end of US 15 concurrency; access to Little League Museum and Business District
Lycoming	Williamsport	26.5	42.6	26	Basin Street	Westbound exit and eastbound entrance
Lycoming	Loyalsock	25.3	40.7	25	Faxon	Sgts. Thomas Woodruff Sr. and Hamilton Woodruff Memorial Interchange; access via Northway Road
Lycoming	Loyalsock	24.0	38.6	23	Third Street / Warrensville Road – Warrensville, Montoursville	Signed as exits 23A (Third Street) and 23B (Warrensville) eastbound; access to Williamsport Regional Airport and Montoursville
Lycoming	Montoursville	21.7	34.9	21	PA 87 north (Loyalsock Avenue)	Southern terminus of PA 87; access to Williamsport Regional Airport
Lycoming	Montoursville	20.4	32.8	20	Fairfield Road	
Lycoming	Muncy Township	16.9	27.2	17	Lycoming Mall Road	
Lycoming	Muncy Township	15.5	24.9	15	US 220 north – Halls, Pennsdale	Eastern end of US 220 concurrency
Lycoming	Muncy Creek Township	12.8	20.6	13	PA 405 – Muncy, Hughesville	Signed as exits 13A (south) and 13B (north) eastbound
Lycoming	Muncy Creek Township	10.6	17.1	10	Main Street	Westbound exit and eastbound entrance
Northumberland	Delaware Township	5.6	9.0	5	PA 54 – Turbotville	
Northumberland	Delaware Township	1.1	1.8	1	McEwensville, Watsontown	Access via Susquehanna Trail
Northumberland	Turbot Township	0.0	0.0	–	I-80 – Bellefonte, Bloomsburg	Exit 212B on I-80
Northumberland	Turbot Township	0.0	0.0	–	PA 147 south – Milton	Continuation south
1.000 mi = 1.609 km; 1.000 km = 0.621 mi: Concurrency terminus; Incomplete access
