= Broad Run (Little Muncy Creek tributary) =

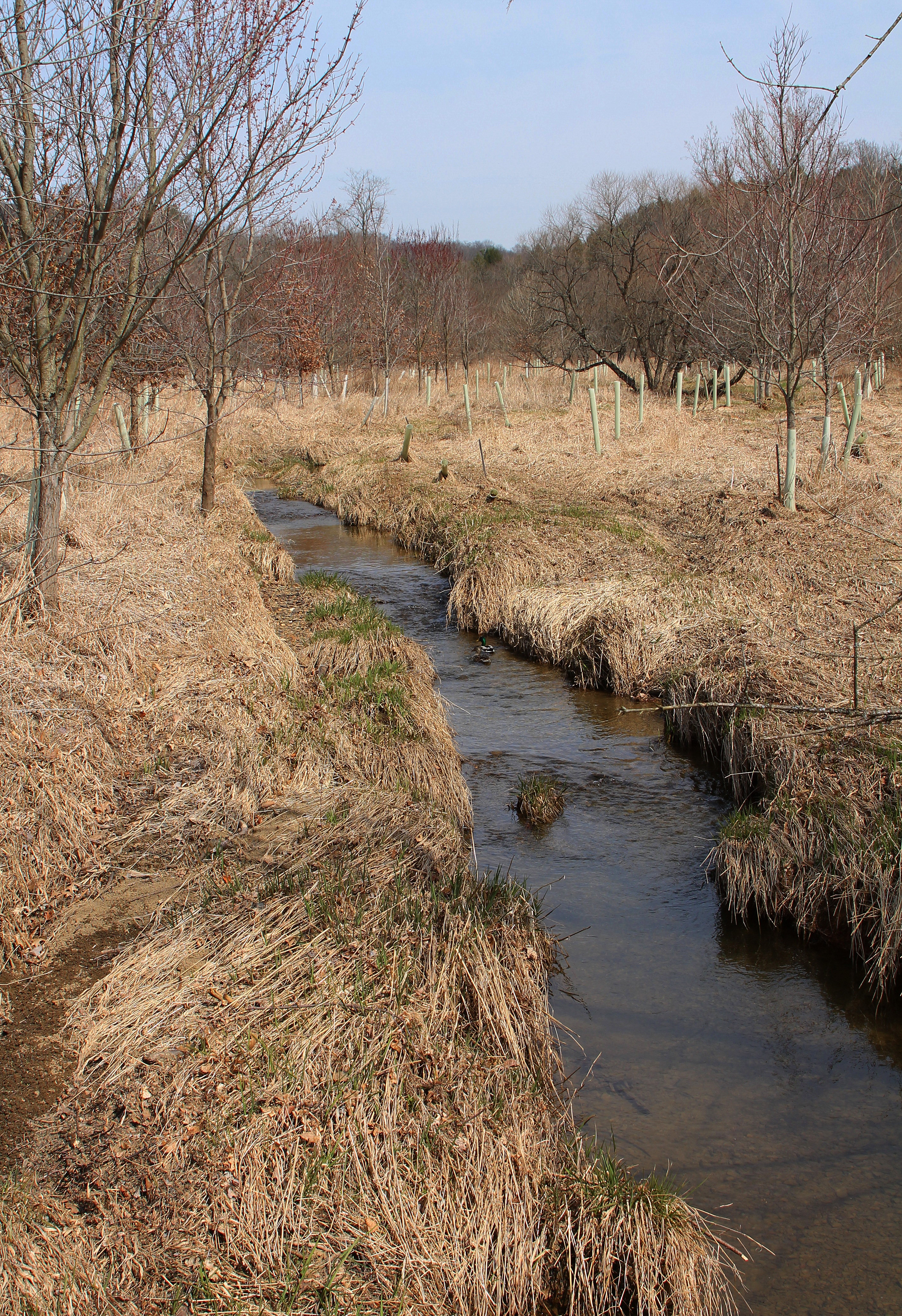
- Broad Run looking upstream

- Location of Broad Run mouth Broad Run (Little Muncy Creek tributary) (the United States)

Physical characteristics
- Source
  - location: Ball Ridge in Moreland Township, Lycoming County, Pennsylvania
  - elevation: 1,023 ft (312 m)
- Mouth
  - location: Little Muncy Creek in Moreland Township, Lycoming County, Pennsylvania near Moreland
  - coordinates: 41°11′13″N 76°40′08″W
  - elevation: 620 ft (190 m)
- Length: 3.7 mi (6.0 km)
- Basin size: 2.94 mi^{2} (7.6 km^{2})

Basin features
- Progression: Little Muncy Creek → Muncy Creek → West Branch Susquehanna River → Susquehanna River → Chesapeake Bay
- Tributaries
  - left: one unnamed tributary
  - right: four unnamed tributaries

Broad Run is a tributary of Little Muncy Creek in Lycoming County, Pennsylvania, in the United States. It is approximately 3.7 miles (6.0 km) long and flows through Moreland Township. The watershed of the stream has an area of 2.94 square miles (7.6 km^{2}). At least one bridge has been constructed over the stream, carrying State Route 2067. Broad Run is classified as a Coldwater Fishery.

== Course ==
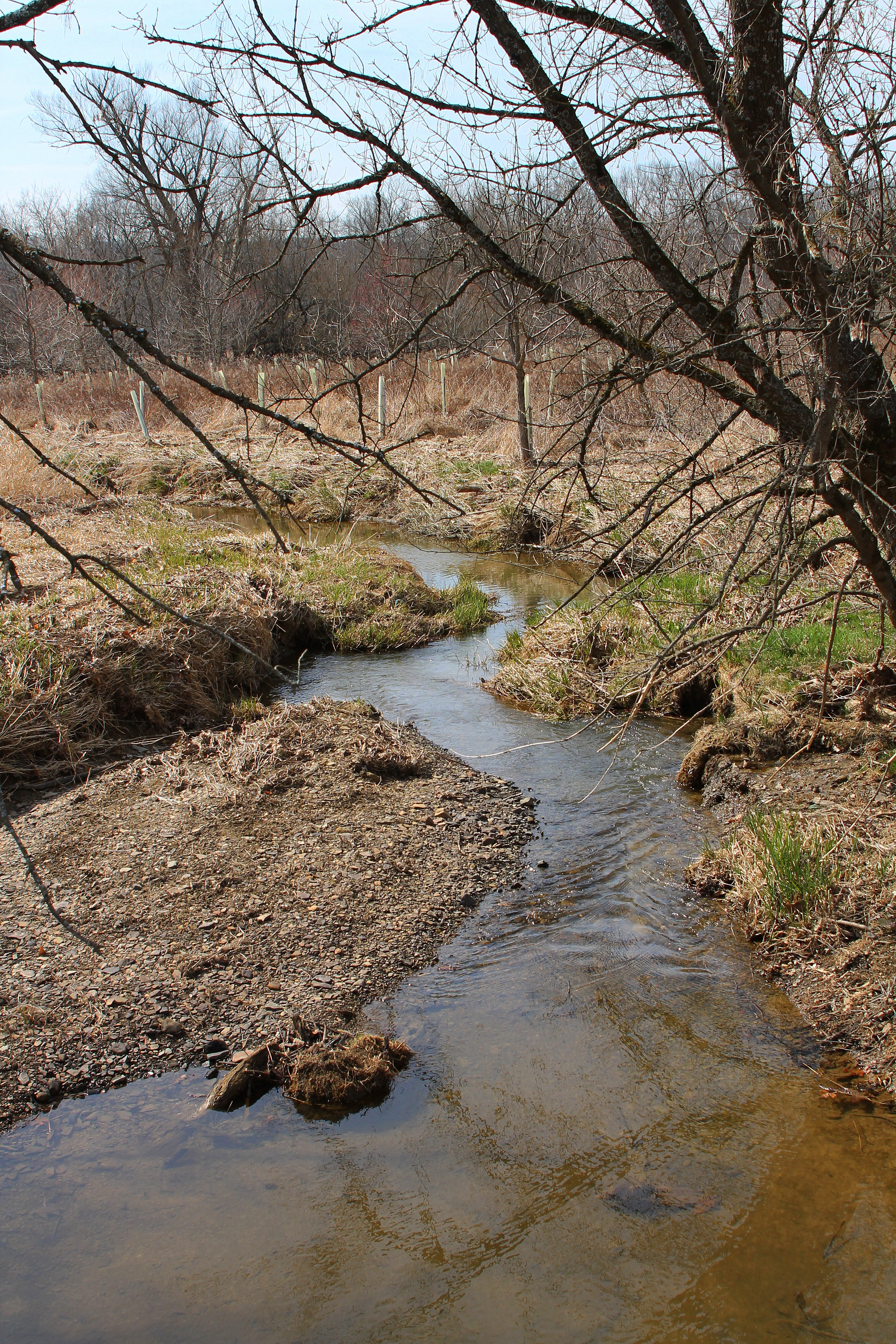
Broad Run looking downstream

Broad Run begins on Ball Ridge in Moreland Township. It flows south-southeast for a few tenths of a mile before turning south-southwest for several tenths of a mile, crossing Pennsylvania Route 118, and receiving an unnamed tributary from the right. The stream then turns south-southeast for several tenths of a mile, flowing through a valley, before receiving a very short unnamed tributary from the left and turning south-southwest. After a few tenths of a mile, it receives another unnamed tributary from the right, and several tenths of a mile further downstream, it turns west-southwest for a short distance and receives an unnamed tributary from the right before turning south-southwest and then west-southwest. After several tenths of a mile, the stream receives an unnamed tributary from the right and turns south-southwest for several tenths of a mile, reaching the end of its valley. It then turns west for a short distance before turning south and reaching its confluence with Little Muncy Creek.

Broad Run joins Little Muncy Creek 8.84 miles (14.23 km) upstream of its mouth.

== Geography and geology ==
The elevation near the mouth of Broad Run is 620 feet (190 m) above sea level. The elevation of the stream's source is 1,023 feet (312 m) above sea level.

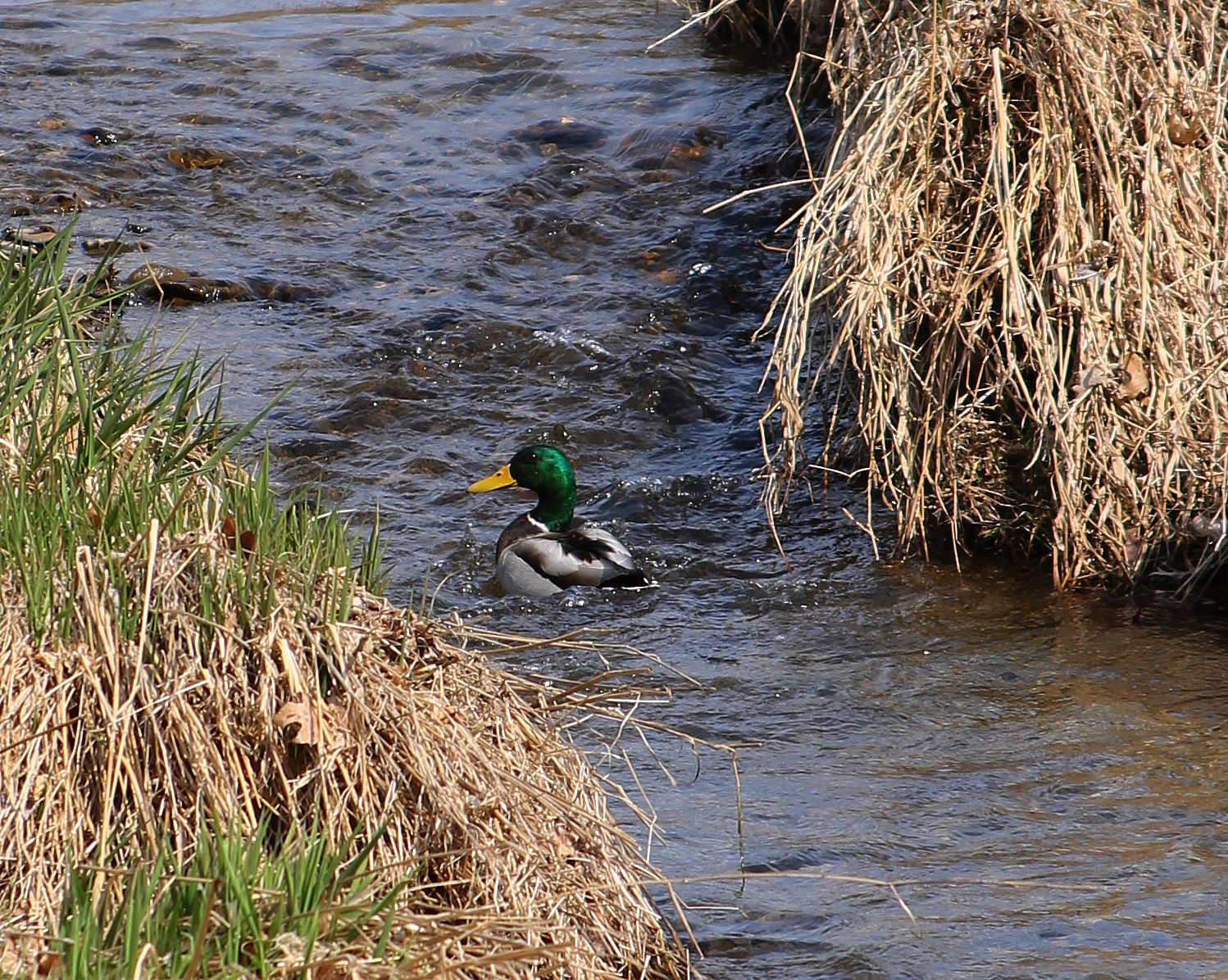
A duck in Broad Run

The watershed of Broad Run has an area of 2.94 square miles (7.6 km^{2}). The stream is entirely within the United States Geological Survey quadrangle of Hughesville. Its mouth is located within 1 mile (1.6 km) of Moreland.

Broad Run is classified as a Coldwater Fishery.

== History ==
Broad Run was entered into the Geographic Names Information System on August 2, 1979. Its identifier in the Geographic Names Information System is 1170290.

A concrete stringer/multi-beam or girder bridge carrying State Route 2067 across Broad Run was constructed 5 miles (8.0 km) east of Clarkstown in 1930 and is 25.9 feet (7.9 m) long. A bridge rehabilitation project involving substructure repair of six bridges in Lycoming County, including one carrying State Route 2067 over Broad Run, for a total cost of $1,530,000.

In 2016, XTO Energy was issued an Erosion and Sediment Control Permit for which one of the receiving waterbodies was Broad Run.

== See also ==
- Laurel Run (Little Muncy Creek), next tributary of Little Muncy Creek going downstream
- German Run, next tributary of Little Muncy Creek going upstream
- List of rivers of Pennsylvania
