= Laurel Run (Little Muncy Creek tributary) =

Physical characteristics
- Source
  - location: Muncy Hills in Madison Township, Columbia County, Pennsylvania
  - elevation: 1,258 ft (383 m)
- Mouth
  - location: Little Muncy Creek in Moreland Township, Pennsylvania near Moreland
  - coordinates: 41°10′40″N 76°40′00″W
  - elevation: 659 ft (201 m)
- Length: 6.8 mi (10.9 km)
- Basin size: 12.2 sq mi (32 km^{2})

Basin features
- Progression: Little Muncy Creek → Muncy Creek → West Branch Susquehanna River → Susquehanna River → Chesapeake Bay
- Tributaries
  - left: 6 unnamed tributaries
  - right: 11 unnamed tributaries

Laurel Run is a tributary of Little Muncy Creek in Columbia County and Lycoming County, in Pennsylvania, in the United States. It is approximately 6.8 miles (10.9 km) long and flows through Madison Township and Pine Township in Columbia County and Franklin Township and Moreland Township in Lycoming County. The watershed of the stream has an area of 12.2 square miles (32 km^{2}). It is classified as a Coldwater Fishery and a Migratory Fishery. A number of bridges have been constructed over the stream.

== Course ==
Laurel Run begins in the Muncy Hills in Madison Township, Columbia County. It flows east-northeast for several tenths of a mile, heading through a small valley as it enters Pine Township, where it receives two unnamed tributaries from the right. The stream then gradually turns north-northwest for several tenths of a mile before entering Franklin Township, Lycoming County, where it receives one unnamed tributary from the left and one from the right. It then turns north for several tenths of a mile before receiving an unnamed tributary from the right. The stream then heads west through a larger valley alongside Pennsylvania Route 442, receiving one unnamed tributary from the left and two from the right before entering Moreland Township.

In Moreland Township, Laurel Run receives two more unnamed tributaries from the right before turning south for a few tenths of a mile as Pennsylvania Route 442 turns away. It then turns northwest for several tenths of a mile, receiving one unnamed tributary from the left and two from the right before continuing to flow alongside Route 442. The stream turns west for several tenths of a mile, receiving one unnamed tributary from the right and one from the left before turning west-southwest for some distance. It receives two more unnamed tributaries from the left before reaching its confluence with Little Muncy Creek.

Laurel Run joins Little Muncy Creek 7.76 miles (12.49 km) upstream of its mouth.

== Geography and geology ==
The elevation near the mouth of Laurel Run is 659 feet (201 m) above sea level. The elevation near the stream's source is 1,258 feet (383 m) above sea level.

== Watershed and biology ==
The watershed of Laurel Run has an area of 12.2 square miles (32 km^{2}). The mouth of the stream is in the United States Geological Survey quadrangle of Hughesville. However, its source is in the quadrangle of Lairdsville. It joins Little Muncy Creek near Moreland. Laurel Run is one of the major streams in Moreland Township, Lycoming County, as well as the southern portion of Franklin Township, Lycoming County.

Laurel Run is classified as a Coldwater Fishery and a Migratory Fishery, as are all of the other tributaries of Little Muncy Creek.

== History ==
Laurel Run was entered into the Geographic Names Information System on August 2, 1979. Its identifier in the Geographic Names Information System is 1179018.

Christopher Derr and Thomas Taggert were among the earliest settlers in the vicinity of Laurel Run.

A steel stringer/multi-beam or girder bridge carrying township road T-477 over Laurel Run was built 0.6 miles (0.97 km) south of Moreland in 1920. In the same year, another bridge of the same type, but carrying T-638 over the stream, was built 1.0 mile (1.6 km) southeast of Moreland. In 1932, a concrete slab bridge carrying a township road over the stream was built 5 miles (8.0 km) south of Clarkstown. A steel stringer/multi-beam or girder bridge carrying State Route 2011 was built 4 miles (6.4 km) southeast of Clarkstown in 1962. A concrete culvert bridge carrying township road 442 over the stream 8 miles (13 km) east of Clarkstown was built in 1966.

== See also ==
- Shepman Run, next tributary of Little Muncy Creek going downstream
- Broad Run (Little Muncy Creek), next tributary of Little Muncy Creek going upstream
- List of rivers of Pennsylvania
