= Oak Run (Wolf Run tributary) =

Oak Run Whiteoak Run

Physical characteristics
- Source
  - location: valley to the southeast of Long Hill in Muncy Township, Lycoming County, Pennsylvania
  - elevation: 848 ft (258 m)
- Mouth
  - location: Wolf Run in Muncy Township, Lycoming County, Pennsylvania near Pennsdale
  - coordinates: 41°14′09″N 76°47′35″W
  - elevation: 528 ft (161 m)
- Length: 2.7 mi (4.3 km)
- Basin size: 2.48 mi^{2} (6.4 km^{2})

Basin features
- Progression: Wolf Run → Muncy Creek → West Branch Susquehanna River → Susquehanna River → Chesapeake Bay
- Tributaries
  - left: one unnamed tributary
  - right: one unnamed tributary

Oak Run (also known as Whiteoak Run) is a tributary of Wolf Run in Lycoming County, Pennsylvania, in the United States. It is approximately 2.7 miles (4.3 km) long and flows through Muncy Township. The watershed of the stream has an area of 2.80 square miles (7.3 km^{2}). The stream is relatively small and flows through a narrow valley. A school district was in the valley in the early 1900s, but the school closed in 1948.

== Course ==
Oak Run begins in a valley to the southeast of Long Hill in Muncy Township. It flows southwest through the valley for several tenths of a mile, receiving an unnamed tributary from the right and passing through a small pond. The stream then turns south-southwest for several tenths of a mile, passing through another small pond before turning south. A few tenths of a mile further downstream, it leaves its valley and turns south-southeast for several tenths of a mile. The stream then receives an unnamed tributary from the left and turns south-southwest for a few tenths of a mile before crossing US Route 220. It then continues south-southwest for a few tenths of a mile before reaching its confluence with Wolf Run.

Oak Run joins Wolf Run 3.50 miles (5.63 km) upstream of its mouth.

== Geography and geology ==
The elevation near the mouth of Oak Run is 528 feet (161 m) above sea level. The elevation of the stream's source is 848 feet (258 m) above sea level.

The valley of Oak Run is relatively narrow and is about 2 miles (3.2 km) long. At its southeastern end, it enters the Muncy Valley. Oak Run itself is a small stream.

There are beds of the upper Mahantango Formation in the vicinity of Oak Run; these underlie the Tully Limestone. The upper Mahantango Formation beds in this area contain brown shale and white clayey shale. Sandstone of the Trimmers Rock Formation also occurs in the stream's vicinity.

== Watershed, hydrology, and biology ==
The watershed of Oak Run has an area of 2.80 square miles (7.3 km^{2}). The mouth of the stream is in the United States Geological Survey quadrangle of Muncy. However, its source is in the quadrangle of Huntersville. The mouth of the stream is located near Pennsdale.

In the late 1960s and/or early 1970s, Oak Run was "moderately depressed" due to concrete waste slug. Fishes in the stream were seriously impacted.

== History ==
Oak Run was entered into the Geographic Names Information System on August 2, 1979. Its identifier in the Geographic Names Information System is 1182798. The stream is also known as Whiteoak Run. This variant name appears in Andrew Sherwood and Franklin Platt's The Geology of Lycoming County, which was published in 1880.

In 1912, the County Commissioners of Lycoming County completed plans for a concrete bridge over Oak Run. The Oak Run School District was historically located in the valley of Oak Run. In the early 1900s, the stream was lined with the houses of people who attended the school. An outbreak of diphtheria occurred in the Oak Run School District in 1914 and 1915. The school closed in 1948.

== See also ==
- List of rivers of Pennsylvania
