= Oak Run =

Oak Run can refer to:

- Oak Run, California
- Oak Run, Illinois
- Oak Run Township, Madison County, Ohio
- Oak Run (Wolf Run), in Lycoming County, Pennsylvania
