= Shepman Run =

Shepman Run Shepmans Run
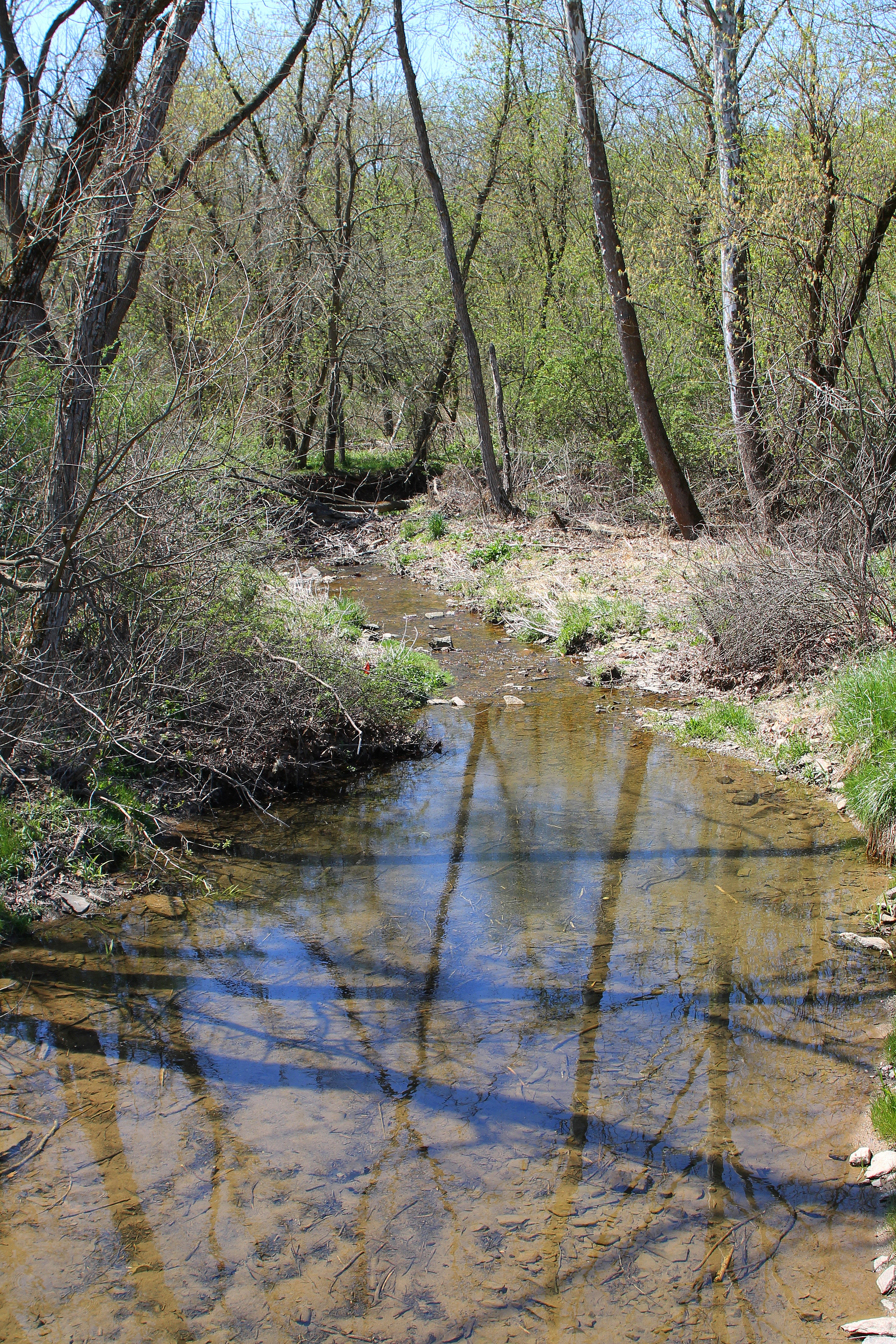
- Shepman Run looking downstream

Physical characteristics
- Source
  - location: valley in Moreland Township, Lycoming County, Pennsylvania
  - elevation: 944 ft (288 m)
- Mouth
  - location: Little Muncy Creek in Moreland Township, Lycoming County, Pennsylvania near Clarketown
  - coordinates: 41°11′26″N 76°41′14″W
  - elevation: 594 ft (181 m)
- Length: 2.6 mi (4.2 km)
- Basin size: 1.59 mi^{2} (4.1 km^{2})

Basin features
- Progression: Little Muncy Creek → Muncy Creek → West Branch Susquehanna River → Susquehanna River → Chesapeake Bay
- Tributaries
  - left: one unnamed tributary

Shepman Run (also known as Shepmans Run) is a tributary of Little Muncy Creek in Lycoming County, Pennsylvania, in the United States. It is approximately 2.6 miles (4.2 km) long and flows through Moreland Township. The watershed of the stream has an area of 1.59 square miles (4.1 km^{2}). A covered bridge crosses the stream. Shepman Run is classified as a Coldwater Fishery and a Migratory Fishery.

== Course ==
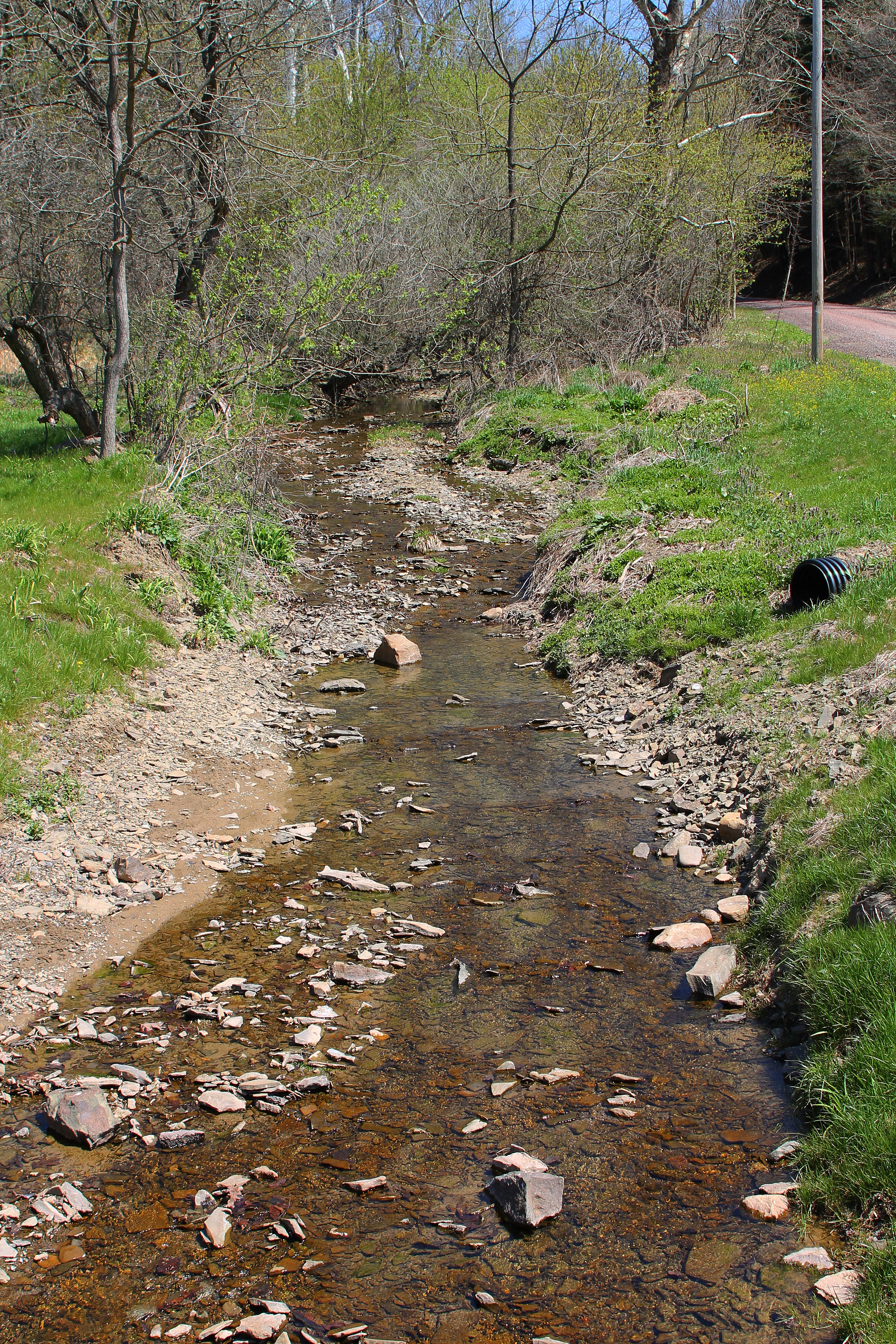
Shepman Run looking upstream

Shepman Run begins in a valley in Moreland Township. It flows east for a few tenths of a mile before turning south for several tenths of a mile. In this reach, the stream receives an unnamed tributary from the left and passes through a small pond. The stream then turns south-southwest for several tenths of a mile before reaching the end of its valley. Shortly afterwards, it turns east for a short distance before reaching its confluence with Little Muncy Creek.

Shepman Run joins Little Muncy Creek 5.86 miles (9.43 km) upstream of its mouth.

=== Tributaries ===
Shepman Run has no named tributaries. However, it does have one unnamed tributary, which is 0.5 miles (0.80 km) long.

== Geography and geology ==
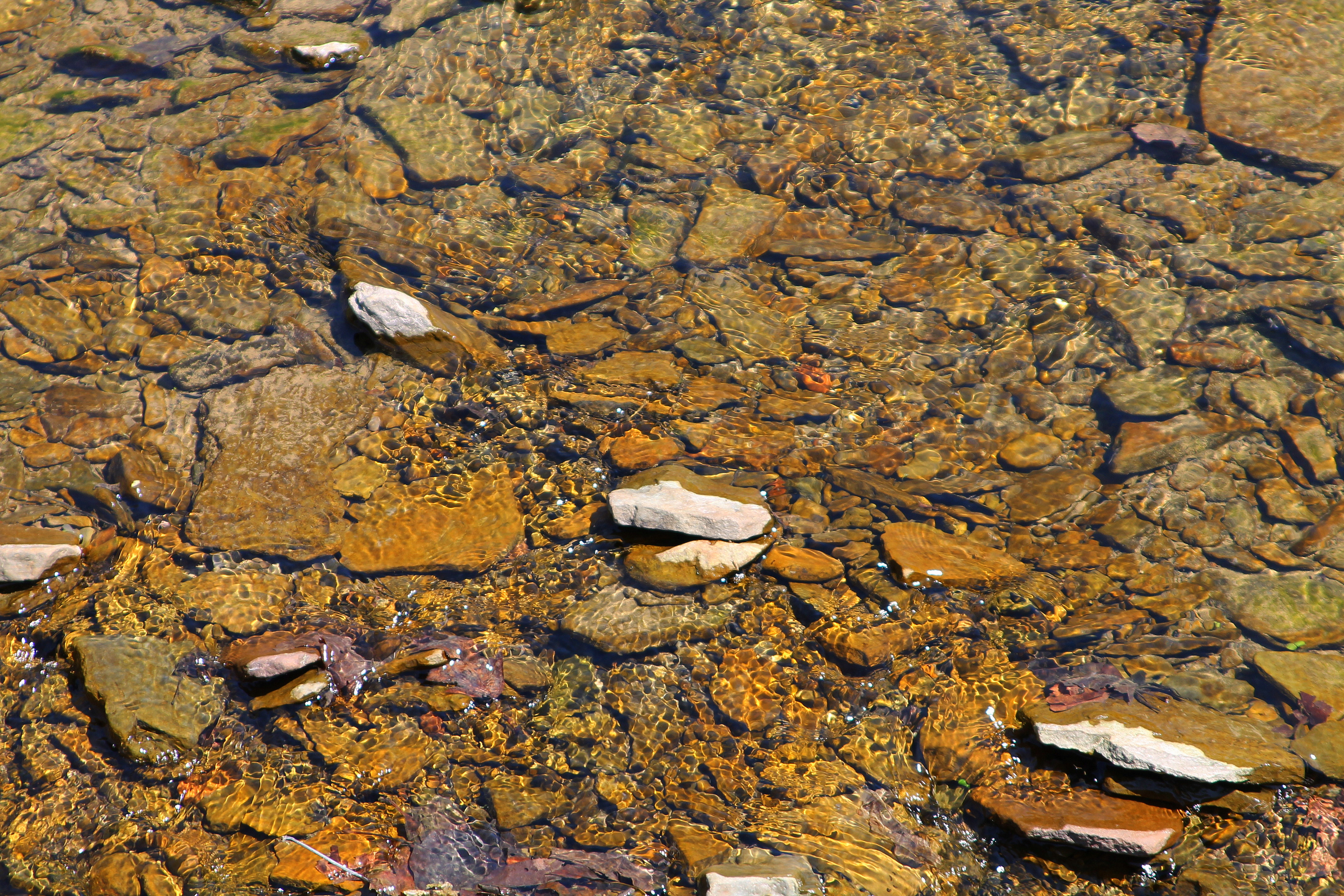
Streambed of Shepman Run

The elevation near the mouth of Shepman Run is 594 feet (181 m) above sea level. The elevation of the stream's source is 944 feet (288 m) above sea level. The stream flows through a valley known as Tommy Hollow.

A bridge known as the Eichenlaub bridge crosses Shepman Run in Moreland Township, off Tom Hill Hollow Road (on the road's west side). The bridge has a length of 16 feet (4.9 m).

== Watershed and biology ==
The watershed of Shepman Run has an area of 1.59 square miles (4.1 km^{2}). The stream is entirely within the United States Geological Survey quadrangle of Hughesville. Its mouth is located near Clarketown.

Shepman Run is in the Lower West Branch Susquehanna sub-basin.

Shepman Run is classified as a Coldwater Fishery and a Migratory Fishery, as are all of the other tributaries of Little Muncy Creek.

== History ==
Shepman Run was entered into the Geographic Names Information System on August 2, 1979. Its identifier in the Geographic Names Information System is 1187470. The stream is also known as Shepmans Run. This variant name appears in The Geology of Lycoming County, which was written by Andrew Sherwood and Franklin Platt and published in 1880.

== See also ==
- Cox Run, next tributary of Little Muncy Creek going downstream
- Laurel Run (Little Muncy Creek), next tributary of Little Muncy Creek going upstream
- List of rivers of Pennsylvania
