= Muncy Creek Township, Lycoming County, Pennsylvania =

Township in Pennsylvania, US

- Township
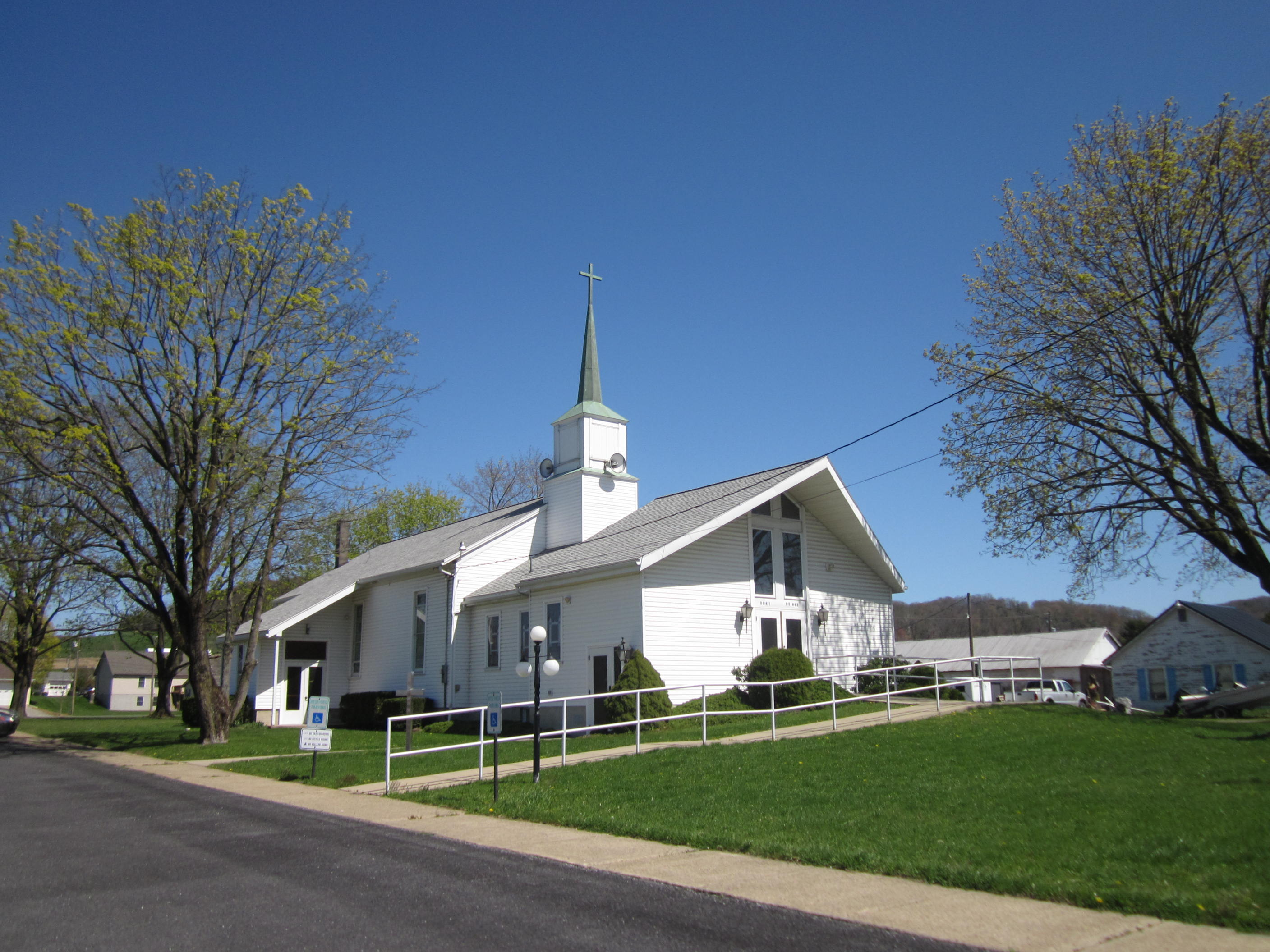
- Clarkstown is a village in the township.

- Logo

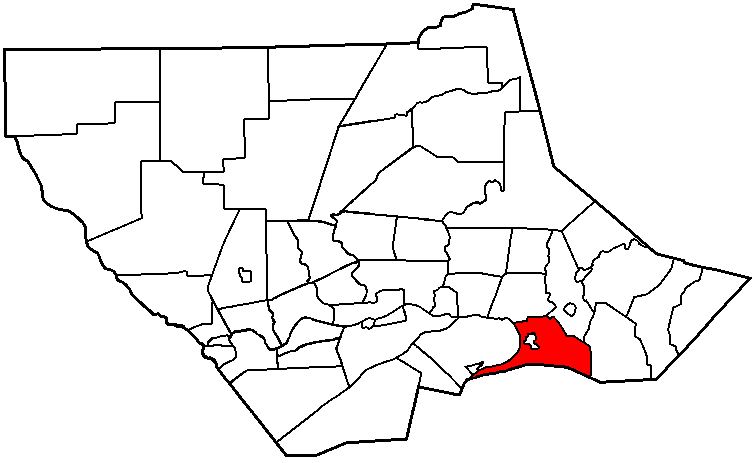
- Map of Lycoming County, Pennsylvania highlighting Muncy Creek Township

- Map of Lycoming County, Pennsylvania
- Coordinates: 41°11′45″N 76°46′9″W
- Country: United States
- State: Pennsylvania
- County: Lycoming
- Settled: 1773
- Incorporated: 1797

Area
  - Total: 20.61 sq mi (53.39 km^{2})
  - Land: 19.92 sq mi (51.59 km^{2})
  - Water: 0.69 sq mi (1.79 km^{2})
- Elevation: 520 ft (160 m)

Population (2020)
  - Total: 3,575 ▲
  - Estimate (2021): 3,552
  - Density: 176.2/sq mi (68.05/km^{2})
- Time zone: UTC-5 (Eastern (EST))
  - Summer (DST): UTC-4 (EDT)
- ZIP code: 17756
- Area code: 570
- FIPS code: 42-081-52288
- GNIS feature ID: 1216764
- Website: www.muncycreektwp.org

Muncy Creek Township is a township in Lycoming County, Pennsylvania, United States. It is not to be confused with the similarly named Muncy Township directly north of it. The population was 3,575 at the 2020 census. It is part of the Williamsport Metropolitan Statistical Area. The unincorporated village of Clarkstown is in Muncy Creek Township.

== History ==
Muncy Creek Township was formed when Muncy Township was divided for the second time in 1797. The township is named for Muncy Creek, a tributary of the West Branch Susquehanna River that flows through it. Some of the oldest settlements of Lycoming County are in Muncy Creek Township. The township also played an important role in the development and regular use of the Pennsylvania Canal along the West Branch. The hamlet of Port Penn rose up along the section of the canal that passed through Muncy Creek Township. This hamlet, greatly reduced in population, was a very busy and sometimes dangerous place.

Muncy Dam was built across the river at Muncy Creek Township. This dam provided the water that was needed to fill the canal along a stretch that began at Port Penn and ended at Sunbury. The dam, canal and towpath were all constructed for a considerable amount of money. Around these construction projects, the hamlet of Port Penn was built. Upon completion of the canal in 1834, it was a thriving community featuring a manufacturer of canal boats. Other businesses in Port Penn included hotels and taverns that provided housing and food for the men working on the canal, and a blacksmith and a saddle maker. There was a butcher who also operated a grocery business, a weaver, a wagon builder, a shoemaker, and an ice business, as well as several teachers, masons and general merchants.

Port Penn quickly gained a reputation as being a dangerous place that attracted "unsavory" characters. Gambling and prize fighting were two popular pastimes. Large amounts of alcohol were consumed by the participants, furthering the danger. An organized group of counterfeiters had an operation in a cabin in Muncy Creek Township that passed fake coins onto the boatmen and others who passed by Port Penn on the canal. A riot took place during the construction of the canal that resulted in several deaths. A man named Barney McCue was responsible for at least two murders at Port Penn, one in 1870 and another in 1874. Many children drowned in the canal and river. The railroad that largely replaced the canal was not less dangerous, as several lives were claimed on the rails. Even the so-called "Last Raft" to be floated down the West Branch took several lives at Port Penn. The raft hit the railroad bridge and sent 45 passengers into the river, seven of whom died.

The canal in Muncy Creek Township brought vast amounts of goods that were stored in warehouses in Port Penn and Muncy. The farmers and industrialists of Lycoming County used these warehouses to store their goods before they were sent south on the canal. The chief exports of the county were hogs, wheat, flour, lumber, dried and salted meats, leather, and whiskey. Whiskey was a very big business. At least 13 distilleries in the area produced a total of 1,200 to 1,500 U.S. gallons (4,500 to 5,700 L) of whiskey a day. Muncy Creek Township also was home to a thriving commercial fishing industry. The dam was an ideal point to catch fish. The bottleneck in the river created by the dam and canal locks caused the fish to be forced into one easy to reach location. Baskets were placed along the dam and locks, and tremendous amounts of fish and eels were easily caught. The dams and locks at Port Penn were destroyed by numerous floods in the West Branch Susquehanna River Valley during the late 1800s. This caused the canal to be abandoned as it was replaced by the railroads. Port Penn was since faded away. There are several homes in the area, but as a hamlet it no longer exists. Parts of Port Penn have been annexed by the borough of Muncy and others are in Muncy Creek Township. Lycoming College and the Muncy Historical Society have spearheaded an effort to uncover the history of Port Penn.

== Geography ==
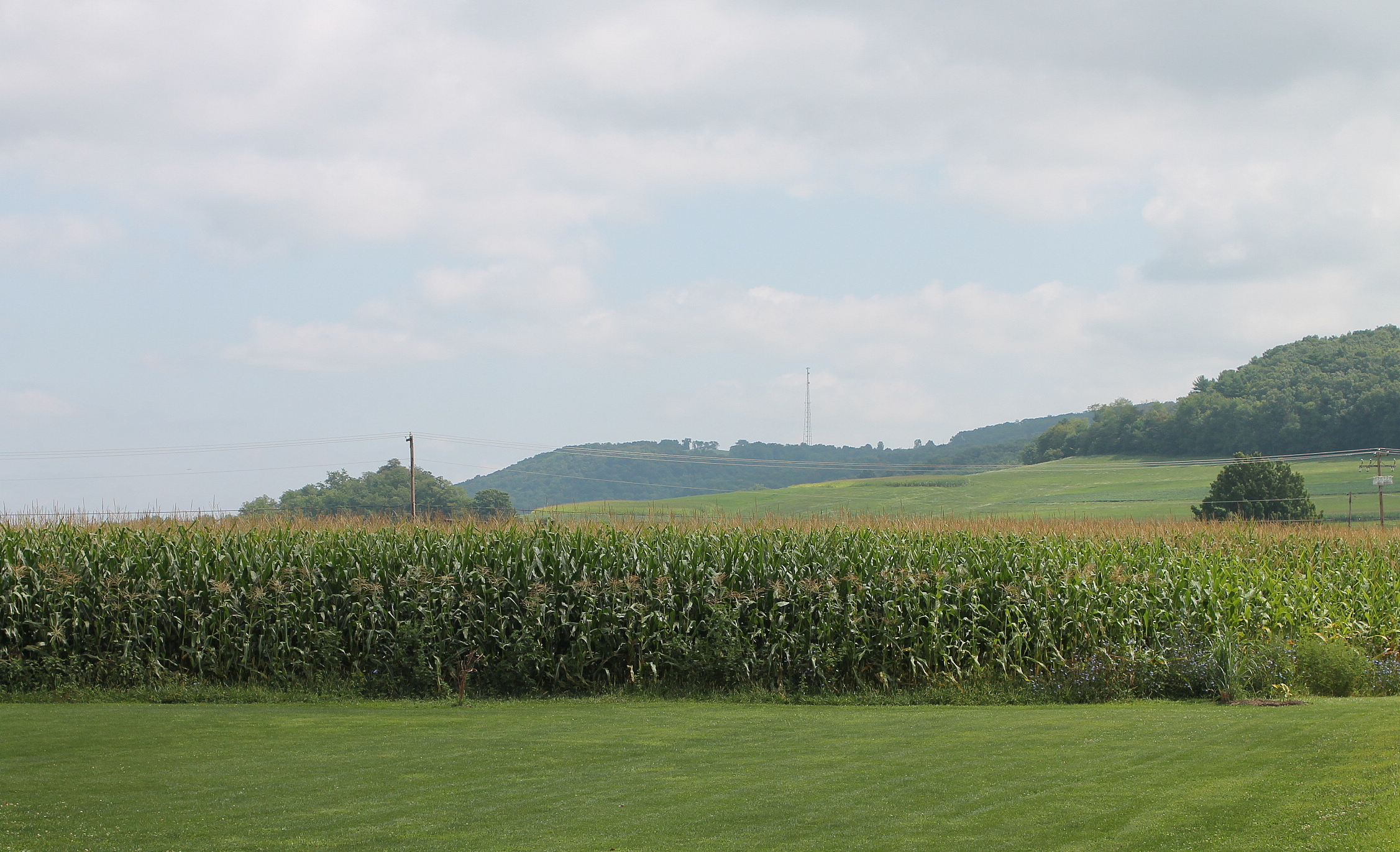
View of Muncy Creek Township

Muncy Creek Township is in southeastern Lycoming County and is bordered by the West Branch Susquehanna River to the west, Muncy Township to the north, Wolf Township to the northeast, Moreland Township to the east, and Montour and Northumberland counties to the south. The township surrounds the borough of Muncy, a separate municipality. Interstate 180 crosses the township, with access from Exits 10 and 13. I-180 leads northwest 14 miles (23 km) to Williamsport, the Lycoming county seat, and south 12 miles (19 km) to Interstate 80 near Milton. Pennsylvania Route 405 crosses the north-central part of the township, passing through Muncy borough and leading west 6 miles (10 km) to Montgomery and northeast 3 miles (5 km) to Hughesville. Pennsylvania Route 442 begins at PA-405 near Muncy borough and leads southeast 16 miles (26 km) to Millville.

According to the United States Census Bureau, the township has a total area of 20.6 square miles (53.4 km^{2}), of which 19.9 square miles (51.6 km^{2}) are land and 0.7 square miles (1.8 km^{2}), or 3.36%, are water. Muncy Creek has its confluence with the West Branch Susquehanna River in the township.

== Demographics ==
Historical population
Census	Pop.	Note	%±
2010	3,474		—
2020	3,575		2.9%
2021 (est.)	3,552		−0.6%
U.S. Decennial Census

As of the census of 2000, there were 3,487 people, 1,360 households, and 1,005 families residing in the township. The population density was 173.1 inhabitants per square mile (66.8/km^{2}). There were 1,453 housing units at an average density of 72.1 per square mile (27.8/km^{2}). The racial makeup of the township was 98.68% White, 0.17% African American, 0.11% Native American, 0.60% Asian, 0.09% from other races, and 0.34% from two or more races. Hispanic or Latino of any race were 0.23% of the population.

There were 1,360 households, out of which 29.9% had children under the age of 18 living with them, 62.4% were married couples living together, 8.2% had a female householder with no husband present, and 26.1% were non-families. 21.8% of all households were made up of individuals, and 12.2% had someone living alone who was 65 years of age or older. The average household size was 2.48 and the average family size was 2.86.

In the township the population was spread out, with 22.1% under the age of 18, 7.0% from 18 to 24, 25.6% from 25 to 44, 26.2% from 45 to 64, and 19.0% who were 65 years of age or older. The median age was 42 years. For every 100 females there were 92.2 males. For every 100 females age 18 and over, there were 87.2 males.

The median income for a household in the township was $33,403, and the median income for a family was $39,818. Males had a median income of $29,545 versus $22,554 for females. The per capita income for the township was $15,500. About 8.2% of families and 10.7% of the population were below the poverty line, including 14.5% of those under age 18 and 13.0% of those age 65 or over.

== Schools ==
- Muncy School District - public school
