= Reading-Halls Station Bridge =

- U.S. National Register of Historic Places
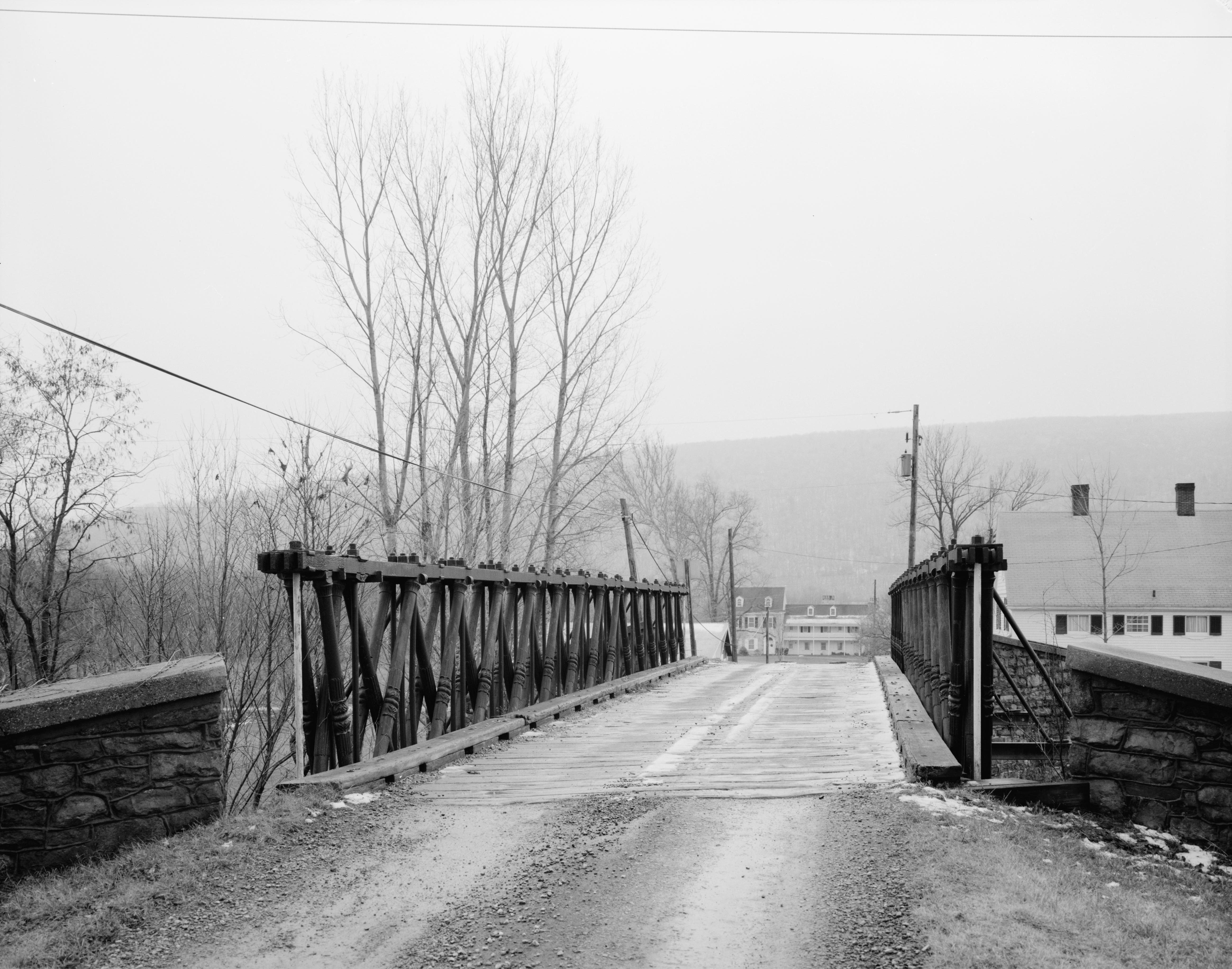
- Reading-Halls Station Bridge, January 1984

- Location within Pennsylvania Location within the United States
- Location: Northwest of Muncy off U.S. Route 220, Muncy Township, Pennsylvania
- Coordinates: 41°14′9″N 76°49′58″W
- Area: 0.1 acres (0.040 ha)
- Built: 1846
- Architectural style: Howe pony truss
- NRHP reference No.: 80003571
- Added to NRHP: January 17, 1980

The Reading-Halls Station Bridge is an historic, Howe pony truss railroad bridge in Muncy Township, Lycoming County, Pennsylvania, United States.

It was added to the National Register of Historic Places in 1980.

== History and notable features ==
Built in 1846 by the Philadelphia and Reading Railroad, this historic structure is a single-span bridge that measures approximately 70 feet (21 m) long. It is the oldest bridge of its type still in operation in Pennsylvania. It is likely that Richard B. Osborne, chief engineer for the railroad, designed and built the bridge.

== See also ==
- List of bridges documented by the Historic American Engineering Record in Pennsylvania

== Gallery ==
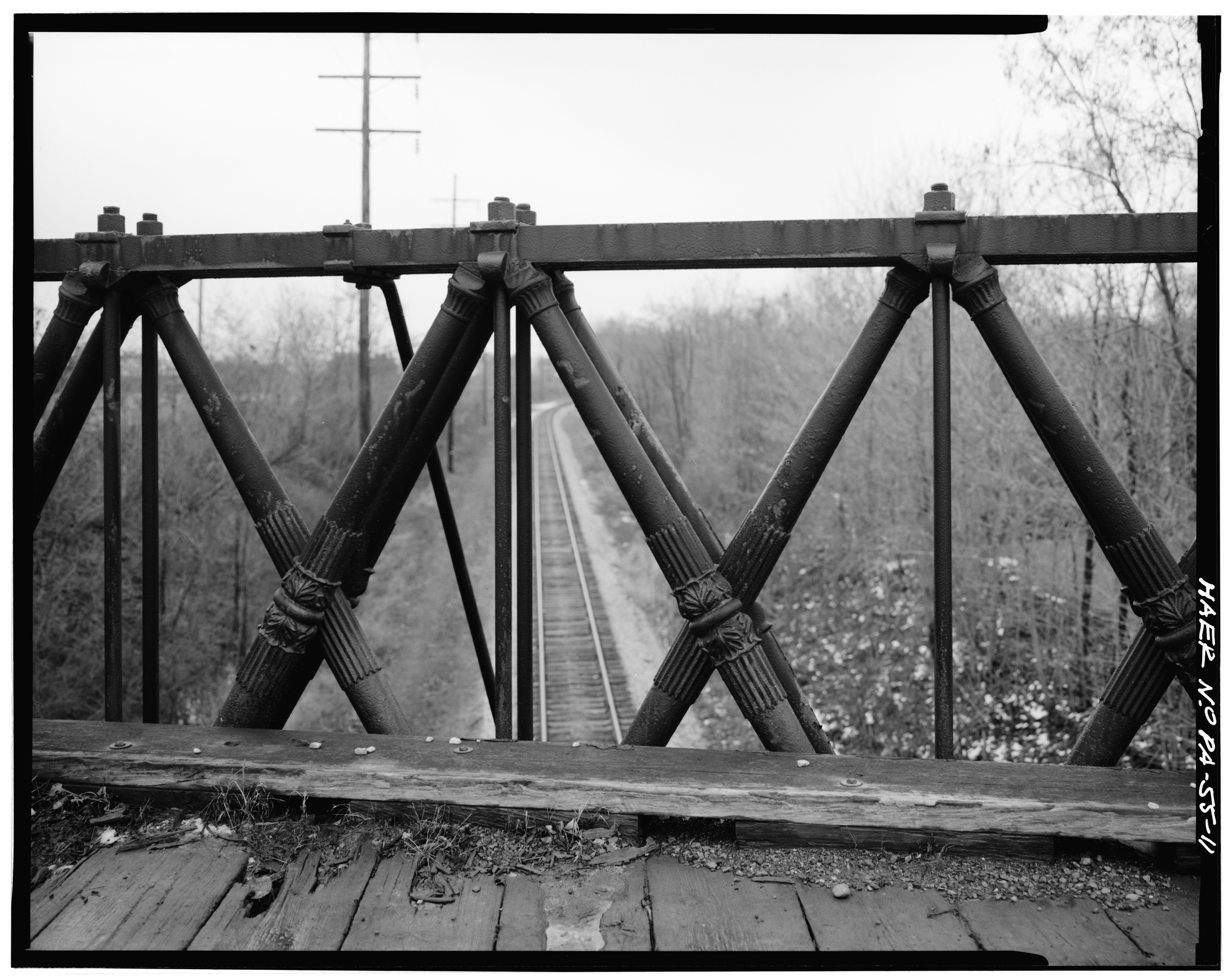
Truss construction with cast-iron diagonal elements in compression and narrow wrought-iron vertical ties in tension
