= The District at Lycoming Valley =

Coordinates: 41.240577°N 76.82670°W

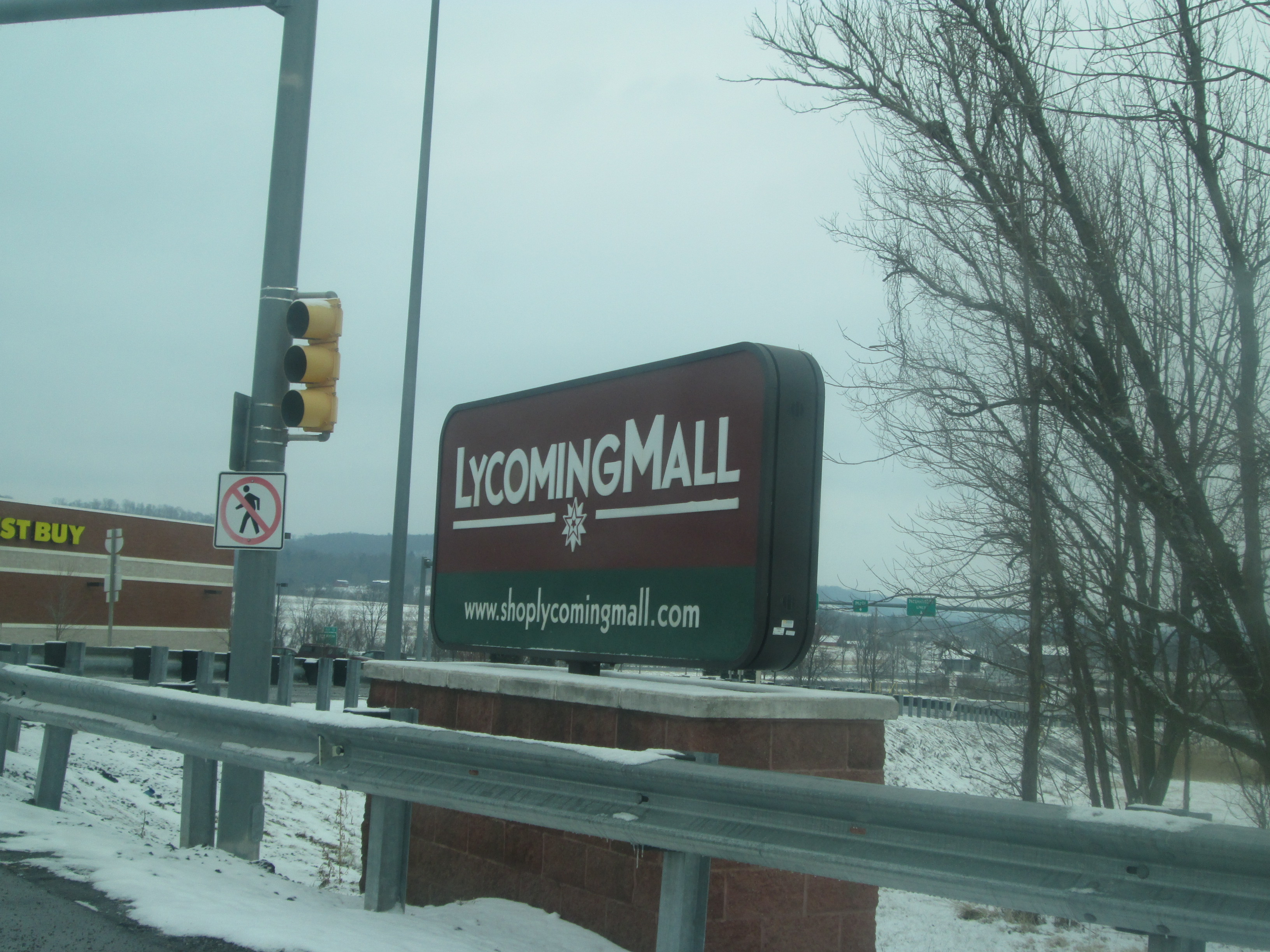
- Mall road sign, 2014
- Location: Pennsdale, Pennsylvania, United States
- Address: 300 Lycoming Mall Circle
- Opened: 1978
- Closed: February 24, 2023
- Developer: Crown American
- Owner: FamVest Partners LLC
- Floor area: 834,600 sq ft (77,540 m^{2})
- Parking: 4,654 spaces
- Public transit: RVT bus: 90, 102, 316, 318; BeST Transit bus: Lycoming/Arnot (Tioga), Lycoming Mall (Bradford County)

The District at Lycoming Valley is a mixed use redevelopment of the former Lycoming Mall in Pennsdale, Pennsylvania. The Lycoming Mall closed on February 24, 2023.

== History ==
=== 1978–2015 ===
Plans for Lycoming Mall were announced in 1975, with 674,000 sq. ft. of space and Gee Bee, Hess's, and Sears as anchors. Hess's would open on March 1, 1978, with the rest of the mall opening July 15, 1978, and Sears a few weeks later. Plans included a $4.7 million expansion in 1985 that added 115,800 sq. ft. and a Bon-Ton to the mall. J. C. Penney moved from downtown Williamsport to the mall in the late 1980s. During this time, an independent attempt to build a second area mall in downtown failed. Value City would close in March 2008, with Burlington Coat Factory announced as its replacement in May. Books-A-Million opened in November 2011, replacing a closed Borders. The Gap and RadioShack closed in February 2015, with a Gap Factory store opening in the Lycoming Crossing Shopping Center, near Lycoming Mall. PREIT put Lycoming Mall up for sale in January 2015.

=== Sale and downturn: 2016–2022 ===
The mall was sold to Kohan Retail Investment Group for $26.35 million on March 22, 2016, who owns it under the name Lycoming Mall Realty Holding. Macy's closed in March 2017, and owned its anchor store. J. C. Penney closed at the mall on July 31, 2017. Sears was announced to close in January 2018. Lycoming Mall's owners appealed its tax assessment of $44.89 million. The former Macy's was sold for over $500,000 to MC Storage Lycoming LLC, and it will be changed into storage. Bon-Ton closed due to the chain's liquidation. The mall lost power in late August 2018 due to owner not paying its PPL electric bill, but reopened the next day. Lycoming Mall faced sheriff's sale in February 2019 due to unpaid bills from the Lycoming County Water and Sewer Authority. The auction did not occur due to a partial payment by Kohan.

Dick's Sporting Goods moved from the mall to the Lycoming Crossing Shopping Center in late 2021. Lycoming Mall was scheduled go to sheriff's sale in May 2022 due to unpaid bills of almost $240,000 from the Lycoming County Water and Sewer Authority. Its sale was later cancelled after the owners paid almost $300,000 in bills and fees.

=== Proposed redevelopment, closure, and new name: 2023–present ===
Redevelopment plans were proposed by FamVest Partners LLC that involved the sale and partial demolition of the mall, with the mall being re-positioned to mixed use. In mid-February 2023, ownership gave notices to vacate to the remaining interior stores except for Books-A-Million and Burlington. Lycoming Mall's interior closed on February 24, 2023. The mall in May 2023 was again placed up for sheriff's sale by the Lycoming County Water and Sewer Authority due to unpaid bills. FamVest Partners LLC purchased the mall in June 2023 for $15 million. Lycoming County provided $5 million in loan assistance towards the purchase. Books-A-Million announced the Lycoming Mall location would close in July 2023. The redevelopment of the mall property became known as The District at Lycoming Valley in November 2023. The former malls last retail anchor, Burlington, closed in early 2025.

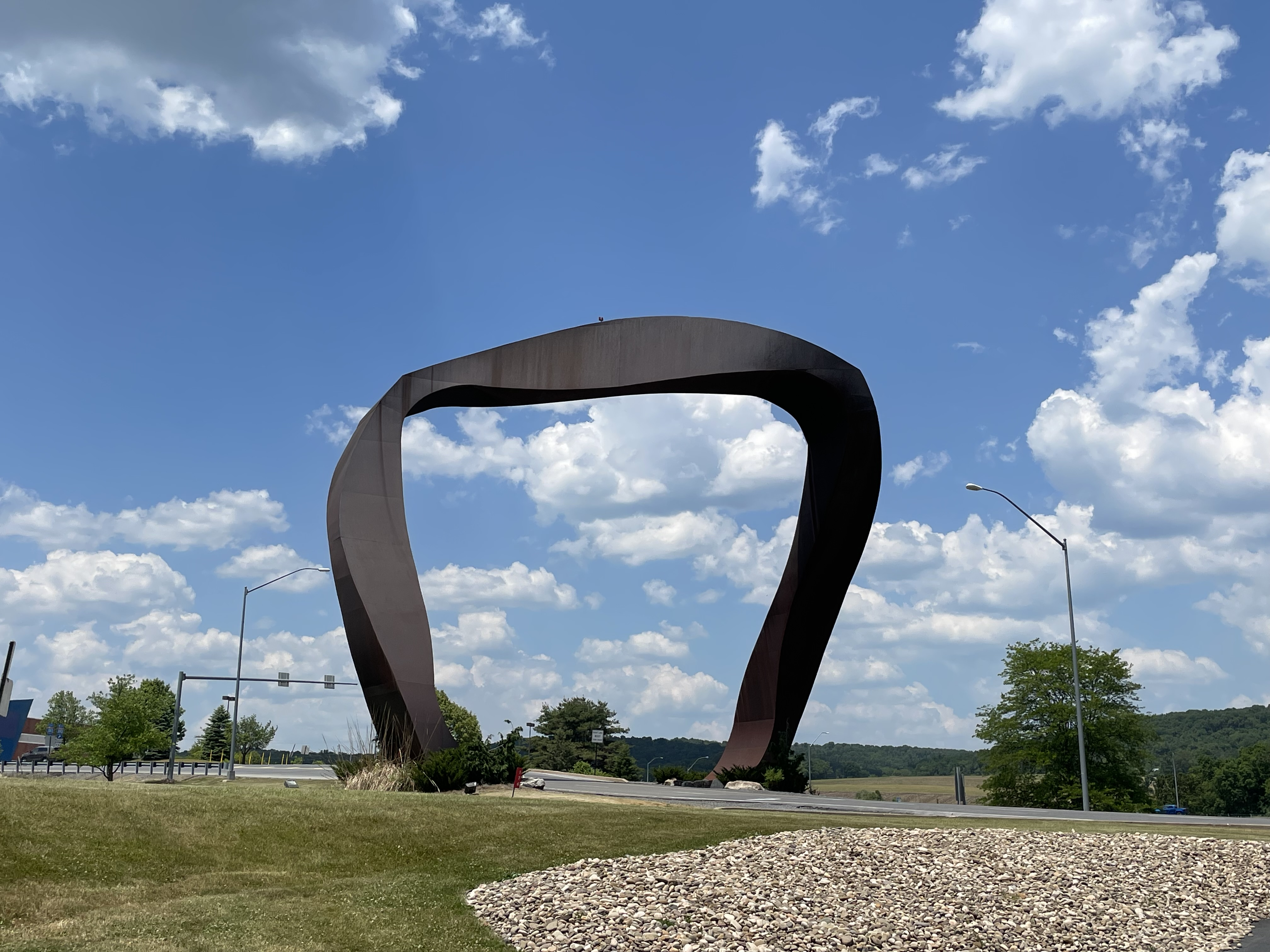
Hadany Arch

== Hadany Arch ==
The mall is noted for the 90-foot-high, 55-foot-wide, 140 ton steel sculpture known as the Hadany Arch. It is named after Israel Hadany, who designed it in 1977. The arch was purchased by board members from Hess's and Crown American, with its dedication being in November 1978. (Note: Some sources report as 100-foot-high.)

== See also ==
- List of shopping malls in Pennsylvania
