= EMTA =

EMTA may refer to:

- Embedded Multimedia Terminal Adapter, a combination cable modem and telephone adapter
- Endless Mountains Transportation Authority (now BeST Transit, serving Bradford, Sullivan, and Tioga counties in Pennsylvania)
- Erie Metropolitan Transit Authority
- European Metropolitan Transport Authorities
- Estonian Academy of Music and Theatre
- Emergency Medical Technician Ambulance
