= Trade & Transit Centre =

Building in Williamsport, PA, US

Coordinates: 41.24038°N 77.00314°W

General information
- Type: Regional transport hub
- Location: Williamsport, Pennsylvania
- Country: United States
- Opened: Phase 1: 1991; Phase 2: 2016

Technical details
- Floor count: 5
- Lifts/elevators: 2

Other information
- Parking: yes; parking garage across street

The Trade & Transit Centre is a building located in Downtown Williamsport, Pennsylvania.

The building is River Valley Transit's hub of operations, most of the companies routes originate or end at the Trade & Transit Centre. The building features a ground level seating areas as the public waits for its bus, higher floor conference halls, a top floor observation deck and seating as well as multiple board room available for rent by the public.

The buildings parking is held in an adjacent parking garage with handicap parking and accessibility.
