= Houseknecht Farm =

- U.S. National Register of Historic Places
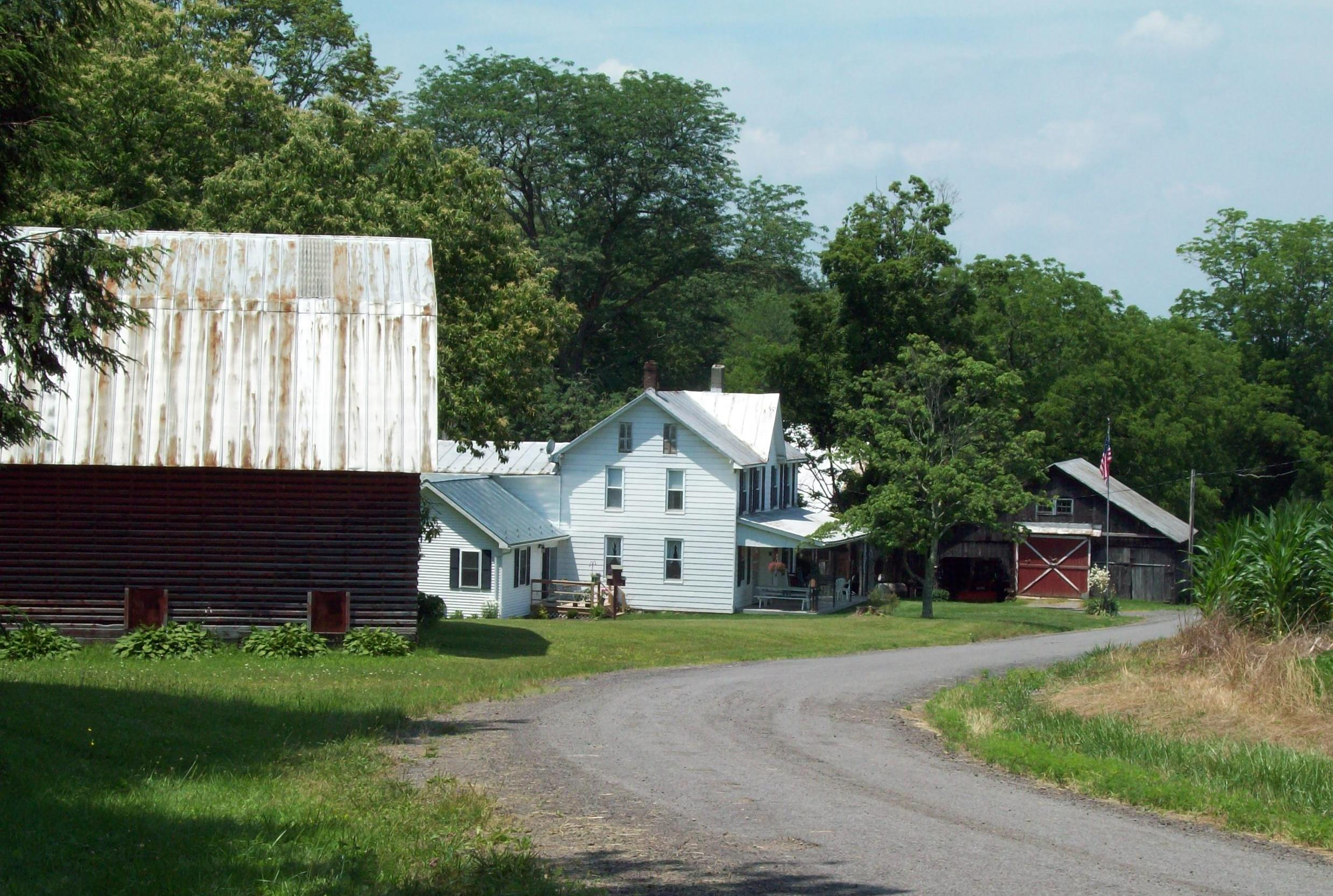
- Houseknecht Farm, July 2011

- Location within Pennsylvania Location within the United States
- Location: 812 J. Houseknecht Rd., Moreland Township, Pennsylvania
- Coordinates: 41°10′41″N 76°38′53″W
- Area: 175 acres (71 ha)
- Built: c. 1890-1915
- NRHP reference No.: 07000795
- Added to NRHP: August 7, 2007

The Houseknecht Farm is an historic house and farm which are located in Moreland Township, Lycoming County, Pennsylvania.

It was added to the National Register of Historic Places in 2007.

== History and architectural features ==
The historic buildings located on this property are the farmhouse, which was built sometime around 1890, a three-gabled barn, which was also built circa 1890 and then later expanded, a three-bay, late nineteenth-century, machine/corn shed, a late nineteenth-century granary with small attached garage that was erected circa 1915, a small machine shed that was also erected circa 1915, a smokehouse that was built circa 1890, and a summer kitchen/butcher house that was also built sometime around 1890, and which has an attached woodshed. The farmhouse is a two-story, four-bay, two-door house with a two-story ell.
