= Lairdsville Covered Bridge =

- U.S. National Register of Historic Places
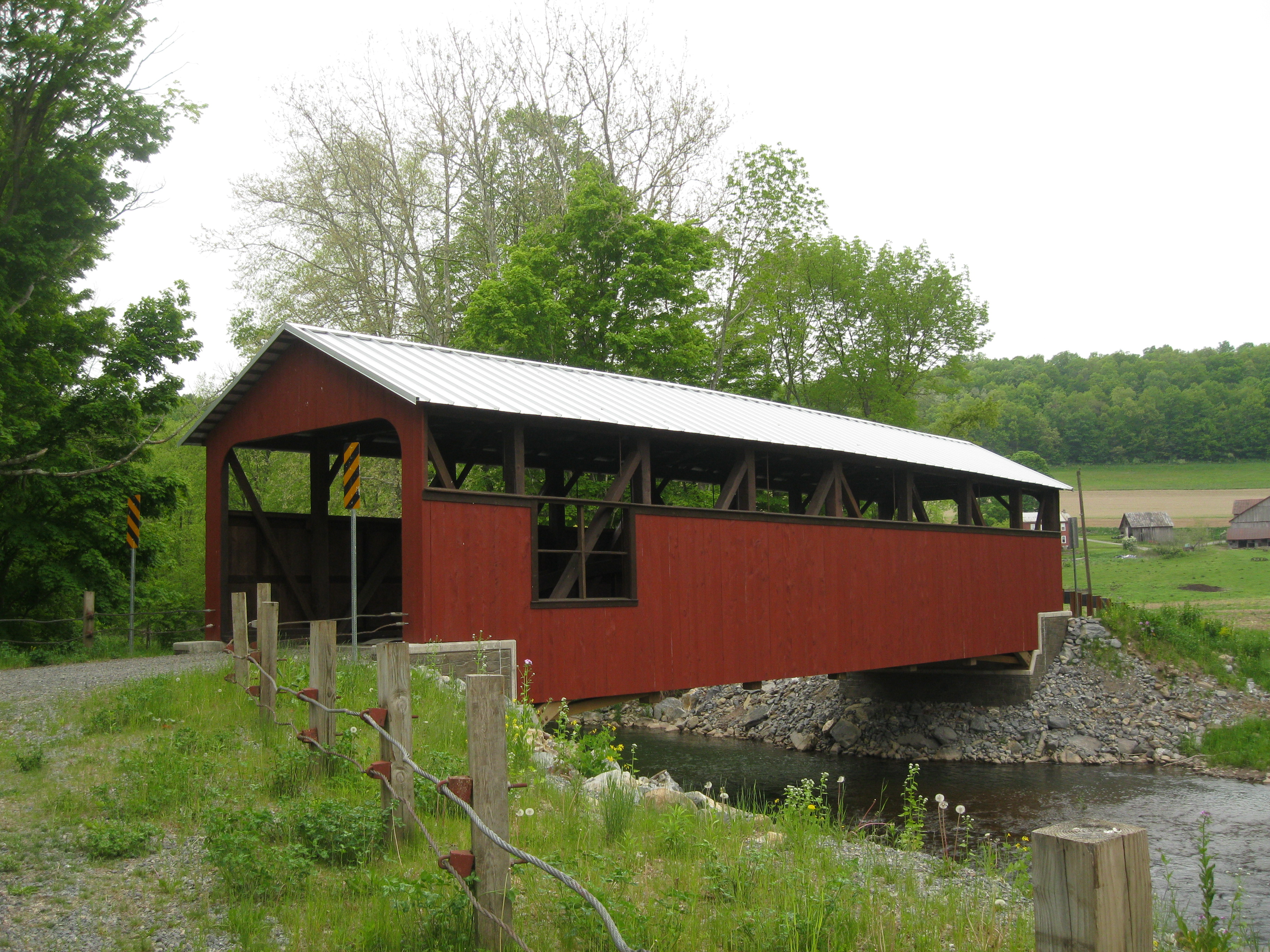
- Lairdsville Covered Bridge over Little Muncy Creek

- Location within Pennsylvania Location within the United States
- Nearest city: Hughesville, Pennsylvania
- Coordinates: 41°12′26″N 76°38′10″W
- Area: 0.1 acres (0.040 ha)
- Built: 1888
- Architectural style: Burr Arch
- MPS: Covered Bridges of Bradford, Sullivan and Lycoming Counties TR
- NRHP reference No.: 80003568
- Added to NRHP: July 24, 1980

The Lairdsville Covered Bridge is a wooden covered bridge over Little Muncy Creek in Moreland Township, Lycoming County, Pennsylvania in the U.S. state of Pennsylvania. It was built in 1888 and placed on the National Register of Historic Places in 1980.

== See also ==
- List of bridges on the National Register of Historic Places in Pennsylvania
