= Muncy Township, Lycoming County, Pennsylvania =

Township in Pennsylvania, US

Muncy Township, Pennsylvania
- Township
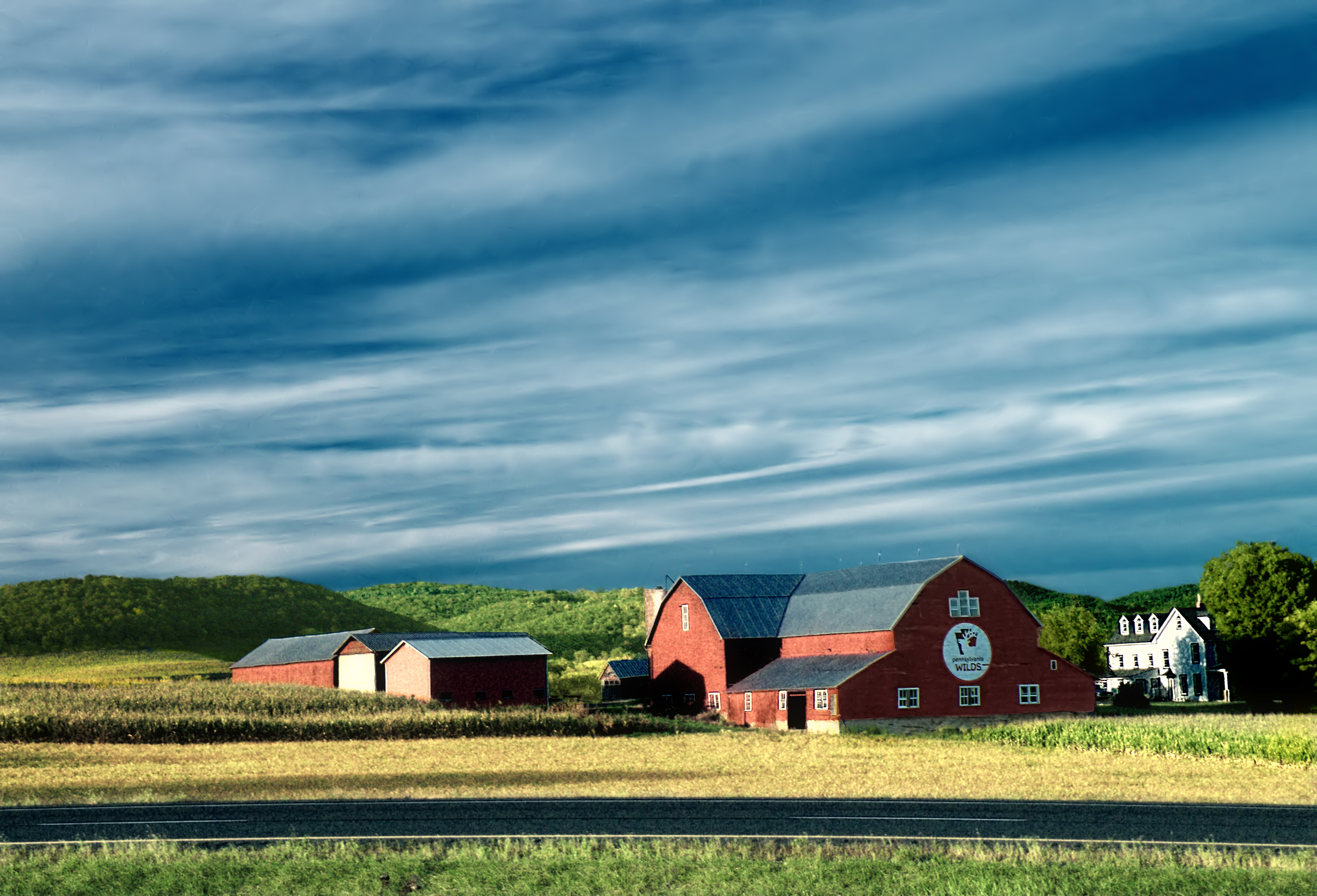
- A farm in Muncy Township

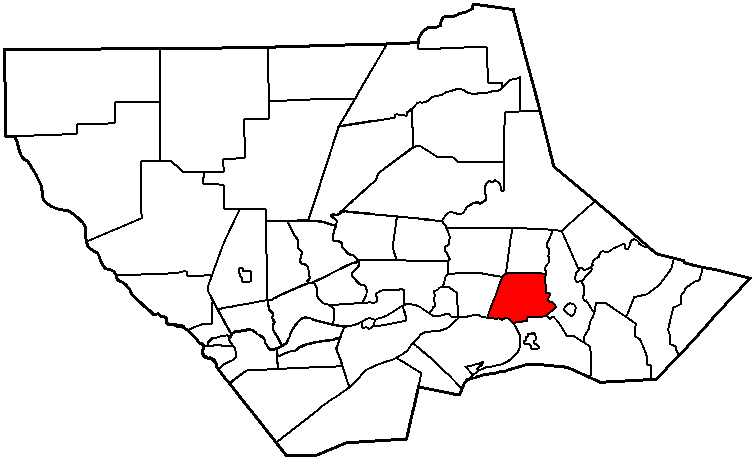
- Map of Lycoming County, Pennsylvania highlighting Muncy Township

- Map of Lycoming County, Pennsylvania
- Coordinates: 41°14′35″N 76°48′4″W
- Country: United States
- State: Pennsylvania
- County: Lycoming
- Settled: 1770
- Formed: 1772

Area
  - Total: 15.71 sq mi (40.68 km^{2})
  - Land: 15.48 sq mi (40.10 km^{2})
  - Water: 0.22 sq mi (0.58 km^{2})
- Elevation: 512 ft (156 m)

Population (2020)
  - Total: 1,177 ▲
  - Estimate (2021): 1,177
  - Density: 69.9/sq mi (26.98/km^{2})
- Time zone: UTC-5 (Eastern Time Zone (North America))
  - Summer (DST): UTC-4 (EDT)
- ZIP code: 17756
- Area code: 570
- FIPS code: 42-081-52280
- GNIS feature ID: 2391498
- Website: https://www.muncytwp.org/

Muncy Township is a township in Lycoming County, Pennsylvania, United States. It is not to be confused with the similarly named Muncy Creek Township directly south of it. The population was 1,177 at the 2020 census. It is part of the Williamsport Metropolitan Statistical Area.

The unincorporated village of Pennsdale is located here. There is a Religious Society of Friends (Quaker) Meeting House in Pennsdale that was built in 1799, and is one of the oldest buildings and perhaps the oldest house of worship in the county.

== History ==
Muncy Township, named for the Munsee tribe, was the first township in the county north of the West Branch Susquehanna River to be formed (predating even Lycoming County itself). It was originally formed as a part of Northumberland County on April 9, 1772. Muncy Township, as one of the seven original townships of Northumberland County, was once an immense township. It had an indefinite northern border. The southern border of the township was the West Branch Susquehanna River. The eastern boundary may have been Muncy Creek, and the western boundary was, like the northern boundary, indefinite. Loyalsock Township was the first township to be formed from Muncy Township, in 1786. This division encompassed the land between Loyalsock and Lycoming creeks. The township was divided several more times. Muncy Creek Township was formed in 1797, Shrewsbury Township in 1804, Fairfield Township in 1825 or 1826, Penn Township in 1828, Wolf Township in 1834, and lastly Mill Creek Township in 1878.

Samuel Wallis was one of the first permanent settlers in Muncy Township. Known as the "Land King", Wallis operated Muncy Farms which was for its time a large and very successful farm. Wallis first came to the West Branch Susquehanna Valley in 1768 as a surveyor. He was born in Harford County, Maryland, in 1730 to a wealthy Quaker family. Wallis received a good education and inherited a large fortune. He sought to expand his fortune in various ways. He worked for a while as a shipping merchant in Philadelphia and became a surveyor. While working as a surveyor, Wallis was introduced to what would become his home in 1768. He gave up his job as a surveyor and began acquiring land up and down the West Branch Valley. His holdings are said to have extended as far west as Pine Creek from his base of operations in Muncy Township. Wallis held title to the land that has since become Muncy borough, Muncy Creek Township, Muncy Township, Montoursville, Loyalsock Township, Williamsport, Woodward Township, Piatt Township, Porter Township and the borough of Jersey Shore. Wallis' home was one of, if not the, first houses to be built in what is now Lycoming County. Samuel Wallis was such an important figure in the early history of Muncy Township that Fort Muncy was built on his land. This fort served as an outpost for the colonial army of Pennsylvania, providing a safe haven for settlers from various Indian attacks.

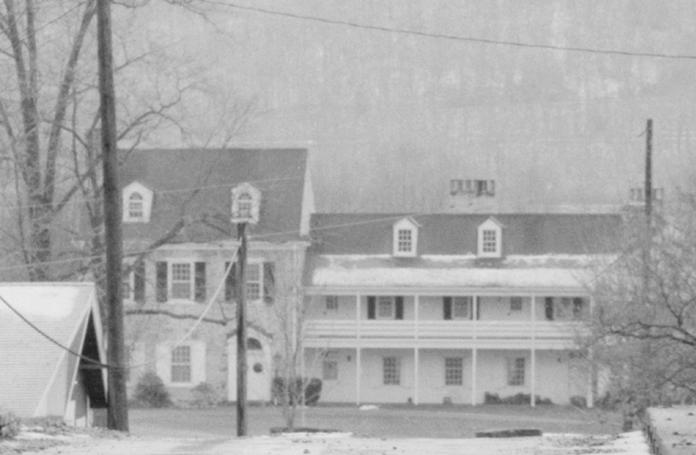
Wallis' house survives (seen here in 1984) and is the oldest in the county today.

Samuel Wallis married Lydia Hollingsworth in Philadelphia on March 1, 1770. They settled at Muncy Farms soon after the marriage and continued to farm while Wallis continued to expand his land holdings. Wallis was forced to flee Muncy Farms during the "Big Runaway". During the American Revolutionary War, settlements throughout the Susquehanna valley were attacked by Loyalists and Native Americans allied with the British. After the Wyoming Valley battle and massacre in the summer of 1778 (near what is now Wilkes-Barre) and smaller local attacks, the Big Runaway occurred throughout the West Branch Susquehanna valley. Settlers fled feared and actual attacks by the British and their allies. Homes and fields were abandoned, with livestock driven along and a few possessions floated on rafts on the river east to Muncy, then further south to Sunbury. The abandoned property was burnt by the attackers. Some settlers soon returned, only to flee again in the summer of 1779 in the "Little Runaway". Sullivan's Expedition helped stabilize the area and encouraged resettlement, which continued after the war. Wallis returned as soon as it was safe and continued to farm. He also built a gristmill along Carpenter's Run. The construction of this mill was entrusted to Colonel Henry Antes of Nippenose Township. Antes was the operator of the most successful mill in the area, along Antes Creek.

Samuel Wallis and James Wilson, a signer of the Declaration of Independence and the Supreme Court appointee of George Washington, became involved with Theophilus Cazenove and the Holland Land Company. This company bought up much of the land that is now northwestern Pennsylvania and western New York near the Great Lakes. Wallis worked as a surveyor and assessor for the land company, and Wilson was heavily invested in the operation. Wilson owed a tremendous debt to Wallis and others. He fled to Edenton, North Carolina, to escape his debts. Wallis followed him there in an effort to reach a settlement. They reached a preliminary agreement and agreed to meet again. Both men died before the debts could be settled. Wallis contracted yellow fever on his return from North Carolina and died in Philadelphia on October 14, 1798. Wilson died in Edenton on August 21, 1798. Wallis' heirs were unable to collect Wilson's debt. Wallis himself left a large debt behind. The heirs were forced to sell Samuel Wallis' land for a fraction of his value to Henry Drinker, who gave the land to his daughter and son-in-law, Elizabeth and Charles Hall. Muncy Farms became known as Hall's Farms.

Pennsdale is a village in Muncy Township. It was founded by a group of Quakers in 1799, who built a meetinghouse there. The first meetings were held in Samuel Wallis's home as early as 1791. The Quakers continue to hold meetings in Pennsdale.

The Reading-Halls Station Bridge was added to the National Register of Historic Places in 1980.

== Geography ==
Muncy Township is in southeastern Lycoming County and is bordered by Mill Creek Township to the north, Wolf Township to the east, Muncy Creek Township and the West Branch Susquehanna River to the south, Fairfield Township to the west, and by Upper Fairfield Township to the northwest. Interstate 180 passes through the township, with access from Exits 15 and 17. U.S. Route 220 joins I-180 at Exit 15, just east of the Lycoming Mall, and the combined highway leads west 11 miles (18 km) to Williamsport. I-180 leads south 15 miles (24 km) to Interstate 80 near Milton, while US-220 leads northeast 55 miles (89 km) to Towanda.

According to the United States Census Bureau, Muncy Township has a total area of 15.7 square miles (40.7 km^{2}), of which 15.5 square miles (40.1 km^{2}) are land and 0.2 square miles (0.6 km^{2}), or 1.43%, are water. Besides Pennsdale, the township's villages include Chippewa and Halls.

== Demographics ==
Historical population
Census	Pop.	Note	%±
2010	1,089		—
2020	1,177		8.1%
2021 (est.)	1,177		0.0%
U.S. Decennial Census

As of the census of 2000, there were 1,059 people, 418 households, and 323 families residing in the township. The population density was 67.8 inhabitants per square mile (26.2/km^{2}). There were 437 housing units at an average density of 28.0 per square mile (10.8/km^{2}). The racial makeup of the township was 97.54% White, 0.09% African American, 0.94% Native American, 0.38% Asian, 0.19% from other races, and 0.85% from two or more races. Hispanic or Latino of any race were 0.66% of the population.

There were 418 households, out of which 27.3% had children under the age of 18 living with them, 69.1% were married couples living together, 5.5% had a female householder with no husband present, and 22.7% were non-families. 19.9% of all households were made up of individuals, and 8.1% had someone living alone who was 65 years of age or older. The average household size was 2.49 and the average family size was 2.85.

In the township the population was spread out, with 22.8% under the age of 18, 5.2% from 18 to 24, 26.2% from 25 to 44, 29.2% from 45 to 64, and 16.7% who were 65 years of age or older. The median age was 42 years. For every 100 females there were 92.2 males. For every 100 females age 18 and over, there were 92.9 males.

The median income for a household in the township was $36,111, and the median income for a family was $40,595. Males had a median income of $29,762 versus $22,135 for females. The per capita income for the township was $20,621. About 6.8% of families and 10.4% of the population were below the poverty line, including 13.0% of those under age 18 and 4.5% of those age 65 or over.

== See also ==
- 1938 Muncy Raft crash
