= River Valley Transit =

Public transit operator in Williamsport, Pennsylvania

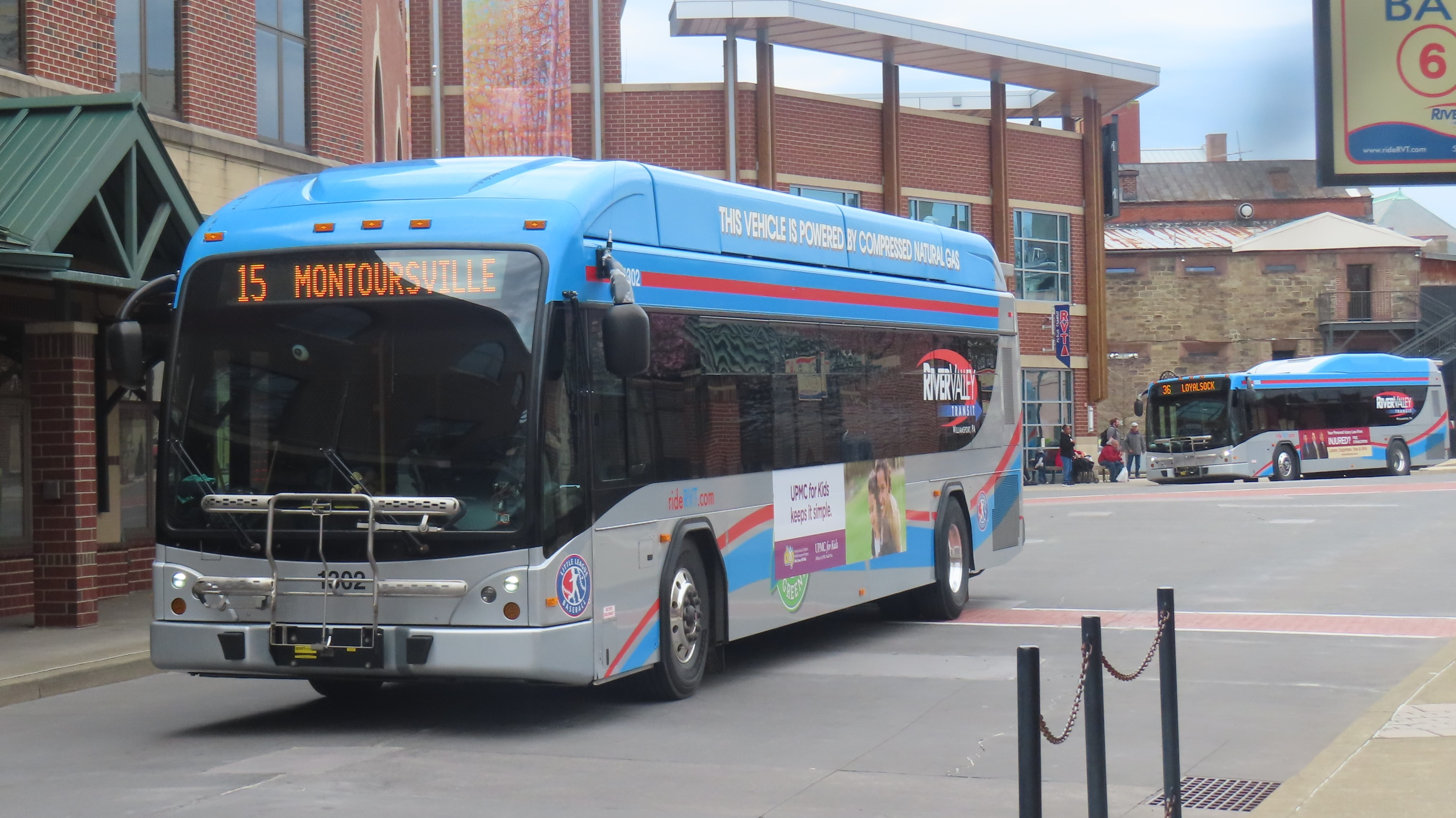
- RVTA buses at Trade & Transit Centre
- Founded: August 8, 1969; July 1, 2022 (as RVTA)
- Headquarters: 1500 West Third Street
- Locale: Williamsport, Pennsylvania
- Service type: bus service, paratransit
- Fuel type: Diesel; CNG
- Website: ridervt.com

River Valley Transit Authority (formerly the Williamsport Bureau of Transportation, and later River Valley Transit) is the public transit operator serving Williamsport, Pennsylvania, and surrounding Lycoming County.

== History ==
In 1969, the City of Williamsport acquired the privately owned Williamsport Bus Company, using grant funding from the Urban Mass Transit Administration and Pennsylvania Department of Transportation. The resulting agency, the Williamsport Bureau of Transportation, began operations on August 8, 1969. The system served Williamsport alongside the surrounding communities of South Williamsport, Montoursville, Duboistown, Loyalsock, and Old Lycoming Township, which formed a partnership to contribute funding to the system.

In 1980, the system rebranded its services as "City Bus," while the organization retained the name Williamsport Bureau of Transportation. City Bus began services to Muncy and Lycoming Mall in 1988, and began trolley service two years later.

November 1999 saw the opening of the Joseph M. McDade Trade & Transit Centre, the system's main hub, built on the site of the former L.L. Stearns department store in downtown Williamsport. The building has bus stop facilities on the ground floor, and also includes commercial offices and a performing arts center. A second building, dubbed Trade & Transit Centre II, opened next door in 2016.

In 2005, the system was rebranded again as River Valley Transit.

In 2011, RVT took over management of the Endless Mountains Transportation Authority, now known as BeST Transit, which operates in Bradford, Tioga, and Sullivan counties. The management agreement between RVTA and BST ended October, 2024.

On February 18, 2022, the Williamsport City Council voted to separate River Valley Transit from the city government, transferring it to a new, independent River Valley Transit Authority. The original RVT, managed as a division of the City of Williamsport ceased operations on June 30, and RVTA commenced operations the next day, July 1, 2022. Public transportation is known as River Valley Transit (RVT).

=== Audits and grant funding investigation ===
In 2021, Pennsylvania Attorney General Josh Shapiro announced an investigation of RVT and the City of Williamsport, alleging misuse of state and federal grant funds from 2009 to 2019. It was suspected that grant funding was used improperly to subsidize river cruise operator Hiawatha, Inc., among other misuses; the city was then sent a letter by PennDOT to cease any potential use of transit dollars for ineligible non-transit related expenses. The Federal Transit Administration also opened a "special review" into RVTA in November 2022.

Also in 2021, River Valley Transit hired accounting firm RKL to perform RVT's annual financial audit. Their audit, presented to the City Council's finance committee in October 2021, found a number of financial inconsistencies and evidence of comingling of funds. The auditors, however, could not get sufficient comfort from the information provided by Slaughter's administration. The nature of transactions they reviewed did not allow them to give clean financial statements.

== Operations ==
=== Fixed-route buses ===
RVTA operates twenty fixed bus routes, all of which originate at the Trade & Transit Centre in downtown Williamsport. Relative to Williamsport and the main bus station, the service area includes the boroughs of South Williamsport and Duboistown to the south; Woodward and Piatt Townships and the borough of Jersey Shore to the west; Old Lycoming Township, including Garden View and Grimesville, to the north; and Loyalsock Township, and the boroughs of Montoursville, Muncy, and Hughesville to the east, with Montgomery to the southeast.

Daytime bus service officially begins at 5:30 a.m., and continues until 7:00 p.m. After 7:00 p.m., the two Nightline buses provide service hourly as far east as the Lycoming Mall and as far west as the Reach Road industrial park. The 'late' bus provides outbound only service going west, and offers transportation to employees at the Reach Road Industrial Park at 11 p.m. Saturday services deviate from the weekday schedules on select routes. Fixed routes do not run on Sundays, except during the Little League World Series.

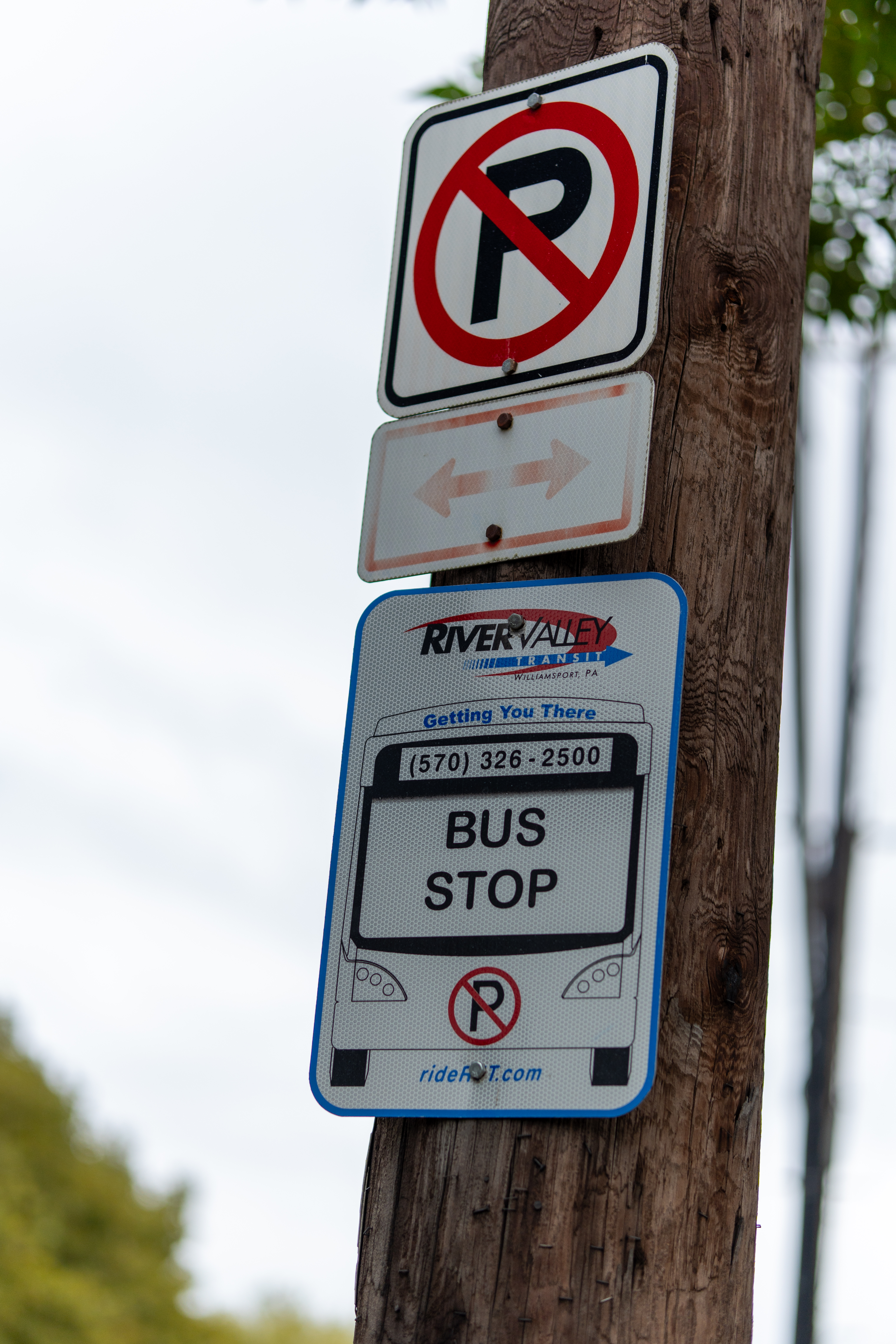
Typical RVTA Bus Stop Sign.

==== Routes ====
- Newberry via Fourth Street
- Montoursville
- Park Avenue - Garden View
- Loyalsock
- South Side - Duboistown
- South Side - Route 15
- East End - ManorCare
- East End - Eldred Street
- West Third Street - Industrial Park
- West Third Street - Newberry Estates
- Tri-Town Connector via Hughesville
- Tri-Town Connector via Montgomery
- Vallamont
- The District Lycoming Crossing
- Downtown Connector
- Jersey Shore Connector
- Valley View Connector
- Lysock View Express
- Super Nightline East
- Super Nightline West
- Penn College
- Penn College Aviation

=== Paratransit ===
RVTA also offers a paratransit service, River Valley Transit Plus. Service is offered to eligible passengers across a service area extending 3/4 of a mile from a fixed route.

== Fares ==
Current as of July 2026 (fare information on page 5 of the Ride Guide)

Fare prices
Fare	Price	Description
Base fare (one ride)	$2.00	Valid for one ride; expires 15 minutes after activation.
One-day pass	$4.00	Provides unlimited rides until midnight on the day of activation. Available at the Transit Transfer Center.
10-ride pass	$14.00	Includes ten single-ride passes, each valid for 15 minutes after activation.
31-day pass	$44.00	Provides unlimited rides for 31 consecutive days after activation.
Senior fare (age 65 and older)	Free	Valid identification is required.
Youth single-ride fare (age 17 and younger)	$1.00	Valid for one ride.
Youth 31-day pass	$15.00	Provides unlimited rides for 31 consecutive days after activation.
Reduced fare	$1.00	Available to eligible passengers with valid identification.
Transfer	Free	Valid for transfers between routes.
Child fare (age 5 and younger)	Free	Available when accompanied by a fare-paying adult.

On July 1, 2026, EZ Fare paper passes were replaced with new payment options. Riders can manage digital passes on the Token Transit smart phone app rather than purchase paper passes. New Smart Cards and Tap to Pay options are alternative options to the smart phone Token Transit app.

https://ridervt.com/fare-information/token-transit/
