= 1938 Muncy Raft crash =

Rafting accident in Pennsylvania, United States

1938 Muncy Raft accident
- Location within PA / United States 1938 Muncy Raft crash (the United States) Location of accident within Pennsylvania / United States
- Location: 41°14′9″N 76°49′58″W; Muncy, Pennsylvania
- Date: March 20, 1938
- Deaths: 7
- Victims: 45 (38 were saved)

The 1938 Muncy Raft crash, also referred to as The Last Raft tragedy, was a rafting accident that occurred on March 20, 1938, in Muncy Township, Pennsylvania. It killed seven of the 45 people on board; the remaining 38 were rescued.

== Background ==
The trip was a historical reenactment of log rafting in the Northeastern United States, particularly northeastern and central Pennsylvania where the logging boom was strongest. Multiple local men decided to hold a memorial rafting trip from Clearfield County to Harrisburg. The men who had done the trip twice before in years past to honor the logging industry in the area agreed that the 1935 trip would be their last; however, some of the group decided to do it one last time in 1938. This is why it is also known as "The Last Raft Tragedy". The raft was launched on March 14 at McGee's Mill in western Clearfield County. The 200-mile (320 km) trip was expected to take a week and a half to complete. In the beginning there were six experienced rafters on board. They tied off multiple times for food, rest and to meet the crowd which began forming along the riverside. The 112-by-25-foot (34.1 m × 7.6 m) raft picked up dozens of people at Lock Haven and Williamsport.

== Accident ==
External image
- Photos of Muncy Rafting accident - 1938. Vintage photos of the Last Raft Tragedy of 1938

About six days into its trip, on March 20, the raft entered Muncy Township with 45 people on board. Being over 100 feet (30 m) long, the raft was very hard to maneuver. It was approaching the Reading Railroad Bridge when people who were standing on the bridge began shouting at the rafters to try to avoid the pier. The raft struck one of the pillars, and all but two of the 45 people on board were thrown into the river. Hundreds of people were on the bridge watching the raft when it struck, and many jumped into the 40 °F (4 °C) water to try to save the rafters. Many of the deaths were due to drowning, as most on board couldn't swim very well. The last of the seven bodies was recovered a month after the tragic event.
