= Pennsdale, Pennsylvania =

Unincorporated community in Pennsylvania, US

- Unincorporated community
- Location within Pennsylvania Location within the United States
- Coordinates: 41°14′35″N 76°47′48″W
- Country: United States
- State: Pennsylvania
- County: Lycoming
- Township: Muncy
- Elevation: 535 ft (163 m)
- Time zone: UTC-5 (Eastern (EST))
  - Summer (DST): UTC-4 (EDT)
- Area code: 570
- GNIS feature ID: 1183523

Pennsdale is an unincorporated community in Muncy Township, Lycoming County, Pennsylvania, United States.
