= Moreland Township, Pennsylvania =

Township in Pennsylvania, US

- Township
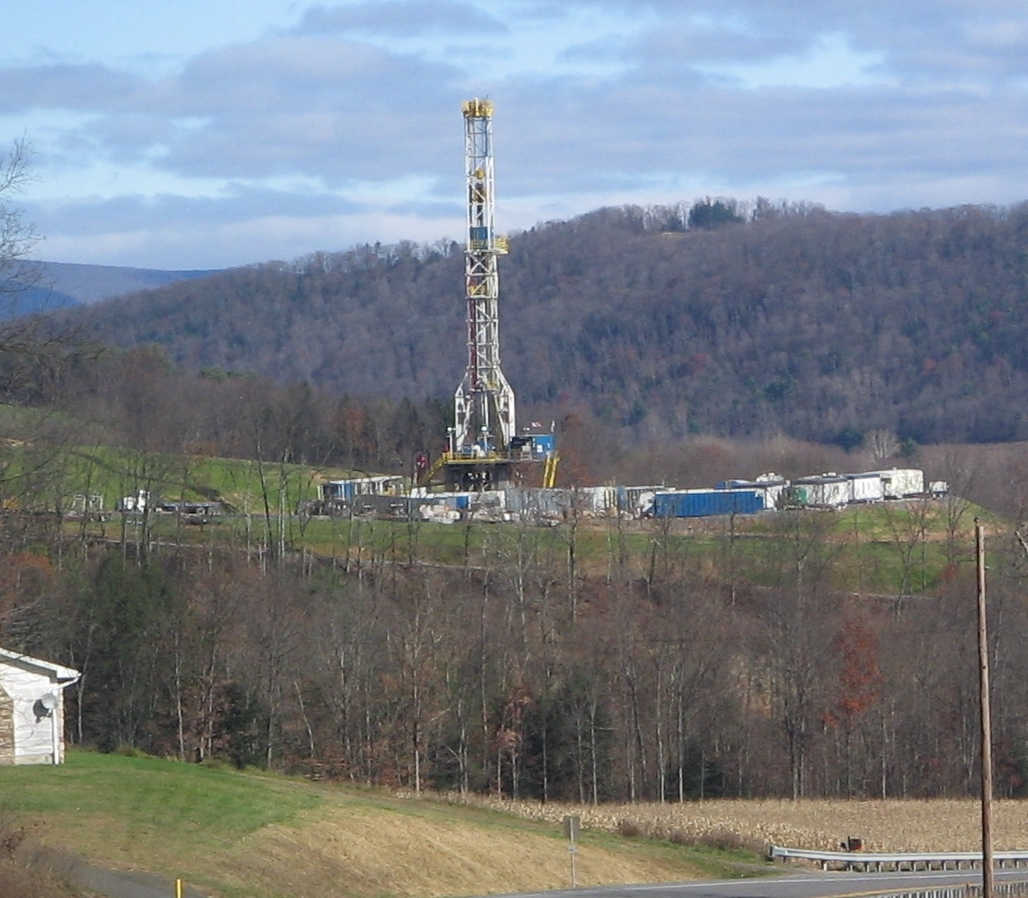
- Tower for drilling horizontally into the Marcellus Formation for natural gas, from Pennsylvania Route 118 in eastern Moreland Township

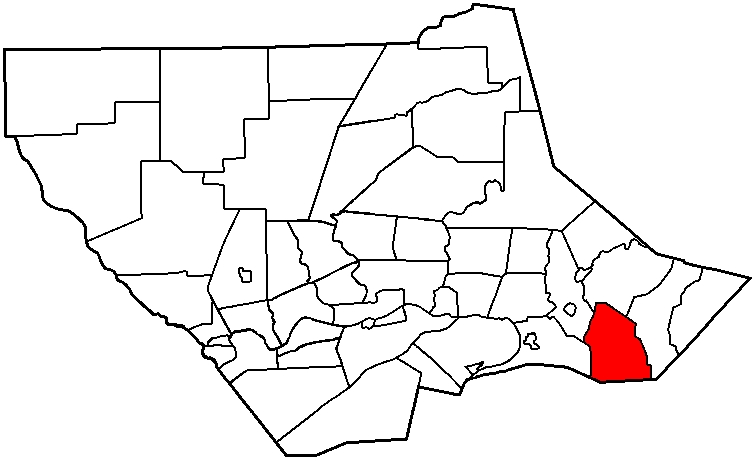
- Map of Lycoming County, Pennsylvania highlighting Moreland Township

- Map of Lycoming County, Pennsylvania
- Coordinates: 41°11′47″N 76°39′28″W
- Country: United States
- State: Pennsylvania
- County: Lycoming
- Settled: 1790
- Formed: 1813

Area
  - Total: 24.05 sq mi (62.28 km^{2})
  - Land: 23.92 sq mi (61.94 km^{2})
  - Water: 0.13 sq mi (0.34 km^{2})
- Elevation: 1,198 ft (365 m)

Population (2020)
  - Total: 1,021 ▲
  - Estimate (2021): 1,017
  - Density: 40.2/sq mi (15.52/km^{2})
- Time zone: UTC-5 (Eastern Time Zone (North America))
  - Summer (DST): UTC-4 (EDT)
- ZIP code: 17756
- Area code: 570
- FIPS code: 42-081-50936
- GNIS feature ID: 1216762

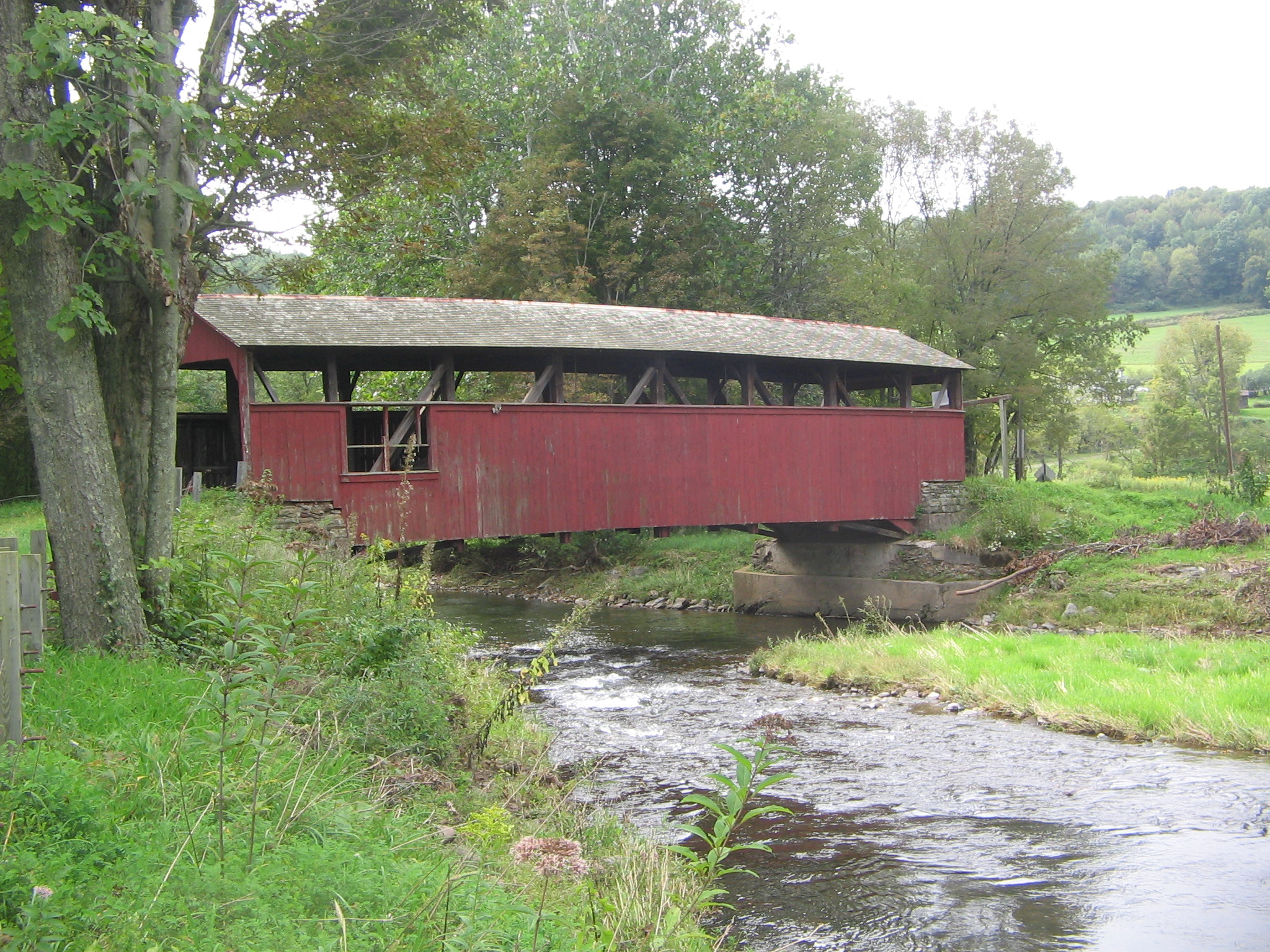
The Lairdsville Covered Bridge over Little Muncy Creek in Moreland Township is one of three remaining in Lycoming County.

Moreland Township is a township in Lycoming County, Pennsylvania, United States. The population was 1,021 at the 2020 census. It is part of the Williamsport Metropolitan Statistical Area.

== History ==
Moreland Township originally covered the entire southeast corner of Lycoming County but was divided into three townships in 1822. One part kept the name Moreland, while the other two parts were Penn and Franklin Township.

The Lairdsville Covered Bridge was added to the National Register of Historic Places in 1980. The Houseknecht Farm was added in 2007.

=== The name ===
There are several stories about how Moreland Township was named. One story states that an early pioneer to the West Branch Susquehanna River Valley was climbing up and down the hills and upon reaching the top of a hill exclaimed, "more land!" Another story relates to the "sloppiness" of the earliest land surveys. An acre was not necessarily measured accurately. These particular acres were larger than they were supposed to be. The early settlers liked to say that they got "more land" to the acre here than they could have elsewhere. The most likely reason relates to an arcane definition of moreland, meaning "a hilly country".

=== Early settlers ===
A veteran of the American Revolutionary War was the first settler in Moreland Township. Colonel George Smith migrated to Moreland Township from Montgomery County in 1790. He built a gristmill there in 1796. Smith and his wife were the parents of six children, three boys and three girls. The marriage of his daughter Annie to a Quaker named William Farr caused some controversy in the early history of Moreland Township. William Farr came from a strict Quaker family who did not look kindly upon his choice of bride. The local Quaker congregation insisted that Farr confess that he had done wrong in marrying outside his faith. Farr refused to do so and insisted that his Baptist wife, Annie, was a good Christian woman. Farr was forced to choose between his Quaker faith and his Baptist wife. He chose his wife and converted to the Baptist faith. Colonel Smith's son, Jonathan, also had a marriage that proved to be interesting. He married Annie Simpson, the sister of John Simpson of Ohio. John Simpson was the grandfather of Ulysses S. Grant who became president of the United States. This family bond meant that many of the residents of Moreland Township in the mid-19th century were second cousins to the man who served as their president.

== Geography ==
Moreland Township is in southeastern Lycoming County and is bordered by Columbia and Montour counties to the south, Muncy Creek Township to the west, Wolf Township to the northwest, Penn Township to the north, and Franklin Township to the east. Pennsylvania Route 442 crosses the southern part of the township, leading northwest 8 miles (13 km) to Muncy and southeast 10 miles (16 km) to Millville. Pennsylvania Route 118 crosses the northern part of the township, leading west 4 miles (6 km) to Hughesville and east-northeast 40 miles (64 km) to Dallas. Williamsport, the Lycoming county seat, is 21 miles (34 km) west of the township.

According to the United States Census Bureau, Moreland Township has a total area of 24.1 square miles (62.3 km^{2}), of which 23.9 square miles (61.9 km^{2}) are land and 0.1 square miles (0.3 km^{2}), or 0.55%, are water. Little Muncy Creek is the main stream through the township, flowing west to join Muncy Creek and then the West Branch Susquehanna River near Muncy. A small part of the southern edge of the township flows via the West Branch of Chillisquaque Creek, another tributary of the West Branch of the Susquehanna. The northernmost part of the township drains westward via Sugar Run and Little Sugar Run to Muncy Creek near Hughesville.

== Economy and environment ==
The Harman Lewis 1H well, a Marcellus Formation shale gas well in Moreland Township, has had a methane leak since 2011. In January 2020, the Pennsylvania Department of Environmental Protection (DEP) issued an order to the well operator, Range Resources, to address the leakage problems "for once and for all". Combustible gas has been found "in groundwater, in soil surveys in nearby farm fields and surfacing on Greg's Run and Sugar Run."

== Demographics ==
Historical population
Census	Pop.	Note	%±
2010	943		—
2020	1,021		8.3%
2021 (est.)	1,017		−0.4%
U.S. Decennial Census

As of the census of 2000, there were 1,036 people, 367 households and 311 families residing in the township. The population density was 43.3 inhabitants per square mile (16.7/km^{2}). There were 391 housing units at an average density of 16.3/sq mi (6.3/km^{2}). The racial makeup of the township was 99.52% White, 0.19% African American, 0.10% Native American, and 0.19% from two or more races.

There were 367 households, of which 37.3% had children under the age of 18 living with them, 75.7% were married couples living together, 4.4% had a female householder with no husband present, and 15.0% were non-families. 12.3% of all households were made up of individuals, and 6.5% had someone living alone who was 65 years of age or older. The average household size was 2.82 and the average family size was 3.08.

In the township the population was spread out, with 26.9% under the age of 18, 6.1% from 18 to 24, 29.2% from 25 to 44, 25.0% from 45 to 64, and 12.8% who were 65 years of age or older. The median age was 40 years. For every 100 females there were 104.3 males. For every 100 females age 18 and over, there were 100.8 males.

The median income for a household in the township was $41,528, and the median income for a family was $46,000. Males had a median income of $32,273 versus $24,464 for females. The per capita income for the township was $17,680. About 5.8% of families and 6.6% of the population were below the poverty line, including 8.1% of those under age 18 and 9.2% of those age 65 or over.
