= Kenneth M. Robbins Stadium =

Multi-purpose stadium in Loyalsock Township, Pennsylvania

- Location within PA / United States KMR Stadium (the United States)
- Former names: Lancer Stadium (1971–1977, 1980–1994); Loyalsock Stadium (1978–1979)
- Location: Loyalsock Township, Pennsylvania, United States (near Williamsport)
- Coordinates: 41.2621°N 76.9642°W
- Owner: Loyalsock Township School District
- Operator: Loyalsock Township School District
- Capacity: 3,500
- Surface: Grass (1971–2010); Astroturf (2011–present)
- Scoreboard: yes

Construction
- Opened: 1971; 55 years ago

Tenants
- Loyalsock Lancers (1971–present); Lycoming Warriors (1979, 1982)

Kenneth M. Robbins Stadium (formerly Lancer Stadium) is an outdoor multi-purpose stadium in Loyalsock Township, Pennsylvania near Williamsport in North Central Pennsylvania, United States.

The stadium currently is home to the Loyalsock Lancers football boys' and girls' soccer teams. It is owned and operated by the Loyalsock Township School District.

== History ==
Formerly called Lancer Stadium, it was opened in 1971. It has been remodeled multiple times in its history: new bleachers were added in the late 1990s, and turf was added in 2011. The turf was donated after the sports dome in Muncy, Pennsylvania collapsed under large amounts of snow on its roof. Originally designed as indoor turf, it was transplanted to Kenneth M. Robbins Stadium.

In 2017, school board and township members announced plans to replace the turf in 2018. On December 23, 2017 officials announced the new turf work would begin in March 2018 and be complete by August 1, 2018.

== Notable events ==
- 1979 and 1982: Lycoming Warriors football teams played home games at the stadium
- 1999: PIAA state football quarter-finals
- 2001: PIAA State football semi-finals
- 2013, 2014, 2015, 2016, 2017: PIAA soccer state semi-finals

== See also ==
- Sports in Pennsylvania
- High school football
