= List of people from Lycoming County, Pennsylvania =

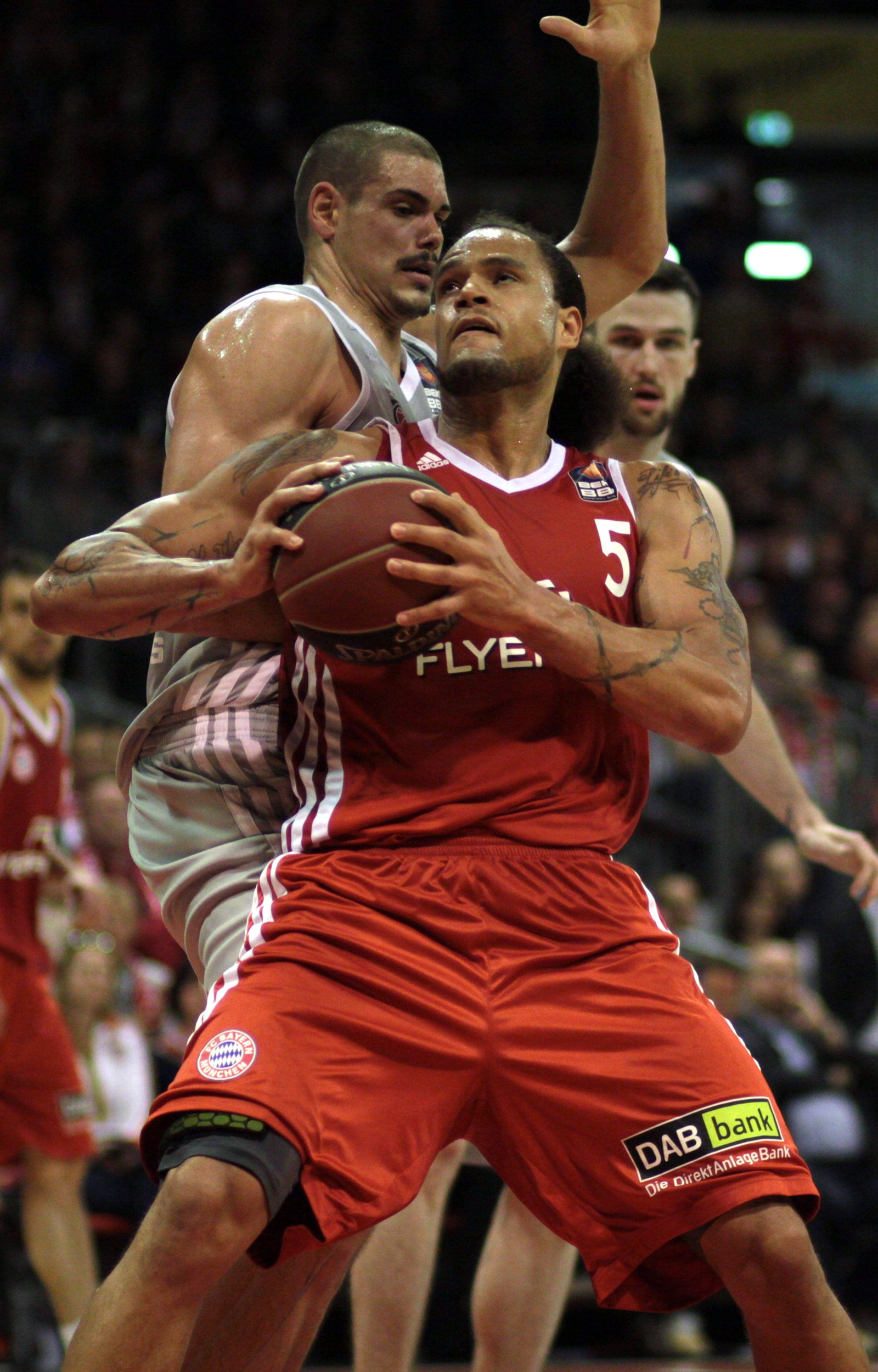
Chevon Troutman was born in Williamsport, Pennsylvania.

The following is a list of people from Lycoming County, Pennsylvania. Inclusion on the list should be reserved for notable people past and present who have resided in the county, either in cities or rural areas.

== Arts and film ==
- Ernest Callenbach (1929–2012), film critic and author
- Newt Heisley (1920–2009), artist
- Frances Tipton Hunter (1896–1957), illustrator
- Severin Roesen (1816 – after 1872), artist
- Tom Woodruff Jr. (born 1959), actor

== Athletes ==
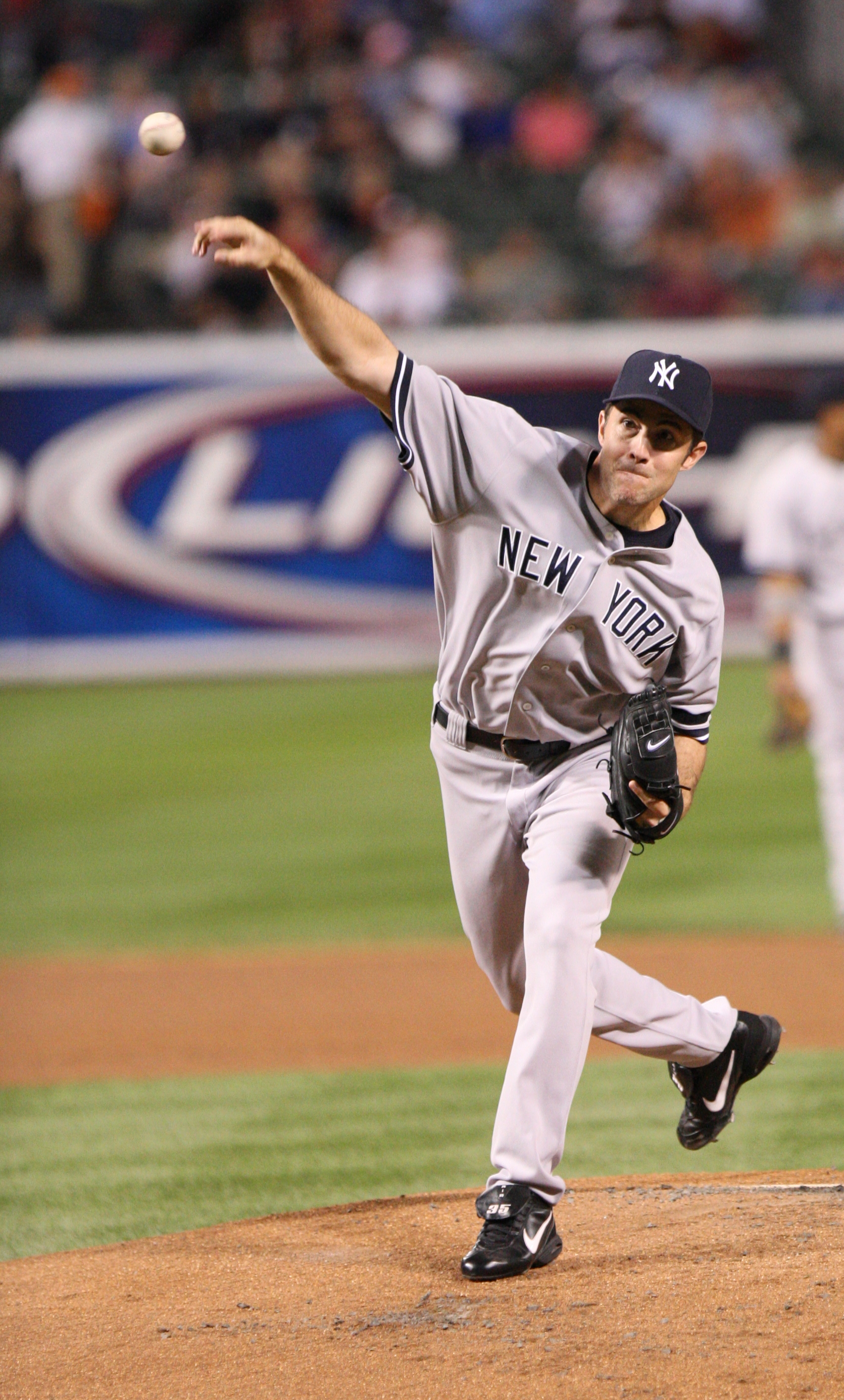
Mussina in 2007

- Butch Alberts (born 1950), MLB pitcher
- Blaise Alexander (1976–2001), NASCAR driver
- Casper Asbjornson (1909–1970), MLB catcher
- Dominick Bragalone (born 1996), college football player
- Gary Brown (born 1969), former NFL running back
- Pat Daneker (born 1976), former MLB pitcher
- D. J. Flick (born 1980), CFL player
- Alize Johnson (born 1996), NBA player
- Larry Kelley (1915–2000), Heisman trophy winner
- Kelly Mazzante (born 1982), WNBA player
- Mike Mussina (born 1968), former MLB All-Star pitcher
- C. W. Smith (1947–2017), NASCAR driver
- Chevon Troutman (born 1981), professional basketball player
- Weldon Wyckoff (1892–1961), MLB pitcher

== Businesspeople ==
- Henry J. Lutcher (1836–1912), business partner of the Lutcher and Moore Lumber Company
- June Maule (1917–2009), owner of Maule Air
- Richard M. Ramin (1929–1995), vice president for Public Affairs at Cornell University
- William Schreyer (1928–2011), former CEO of Merrill Lynch & Co.

== Educators ==
- Julia C. Collins (c.1842–1865), African-American schoolteacher
- Robert E. Streeter (1916–2002), academic and educator
- Martha Dewing Woodward (1856–1950), art teacher

== Law ==
- Lawrence Lessig (born 1961), attorney and political activist

== Military ==
- Albert Ralph Campbell (1874–1925), U.S. Marine

== Musicians ==
- Dylan Rockoff (born 1994), singer-songwriter

== Politics ==
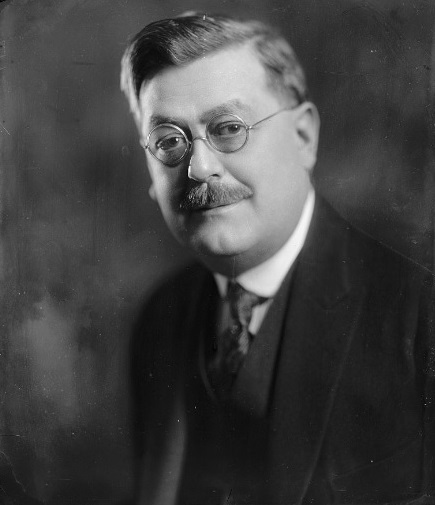
Harris Jacob Bixler

- William Hepburn Armstrong (1824–1919), member of the U.S. House of Representatives from Pennsylvania
- Harris Jacob Bixler (1870–1941), member of the U.S. House of Representatives
- James Hepburn Campbell (1820–1895), member of the U.S. House of Representatives
- Alexander Cummings (1810–1867), third governor of the Territory of Colorado
- Elias Deemer (1838–1918), member of the U.S. House of Representatives
- Thomas W. Dempsey (born 1931), member of the Pennsylvania House of Representatives
- Robert W. Edgar (1943–2013), member of the U.S. House of Representatives
- William Cox Ellis (1787–1871), member of the U.S. House of Representatives
- Edgar Raymond Kiess (1875–1930), member of the U.S. House of Representatives
- Eugene Yaw (born 1943), Pennsylvania state senator

== Science ==
- Cuthbert Daniel (1904–1997), scientist and industrial statistician
- Michael Roskin (born 1939), scientist
- Edgar Nelson Transeau (1857–1960), botanist and phycologist, president of the Botanical Society of America and the Ecological Society of America

== Writers ==
- Juliet H. Lewis Campbell (1823–1898), poet and author
- William Clifford Heilman (1877–1946), poet and composer
- Adam Makos (born 1981), author and historian
- Frank Young (1884–1957), sportswriter

Daniel Hughes

== Other ==
- William Perry Eveland (1864–1916), missionary bishop
- Daniel Hughes (1804–1880), conductor, agent and station master in the Underground Railroad
- Carl Stotz (1910–1992), founder of Little League
- George Valiantine (1847–1947), medium

== See also ==
- List of people from Pennsylvania
