= Garden View, Pennsylvania =

Unincorporated community in Pennsylvania, US

- Census-designated place
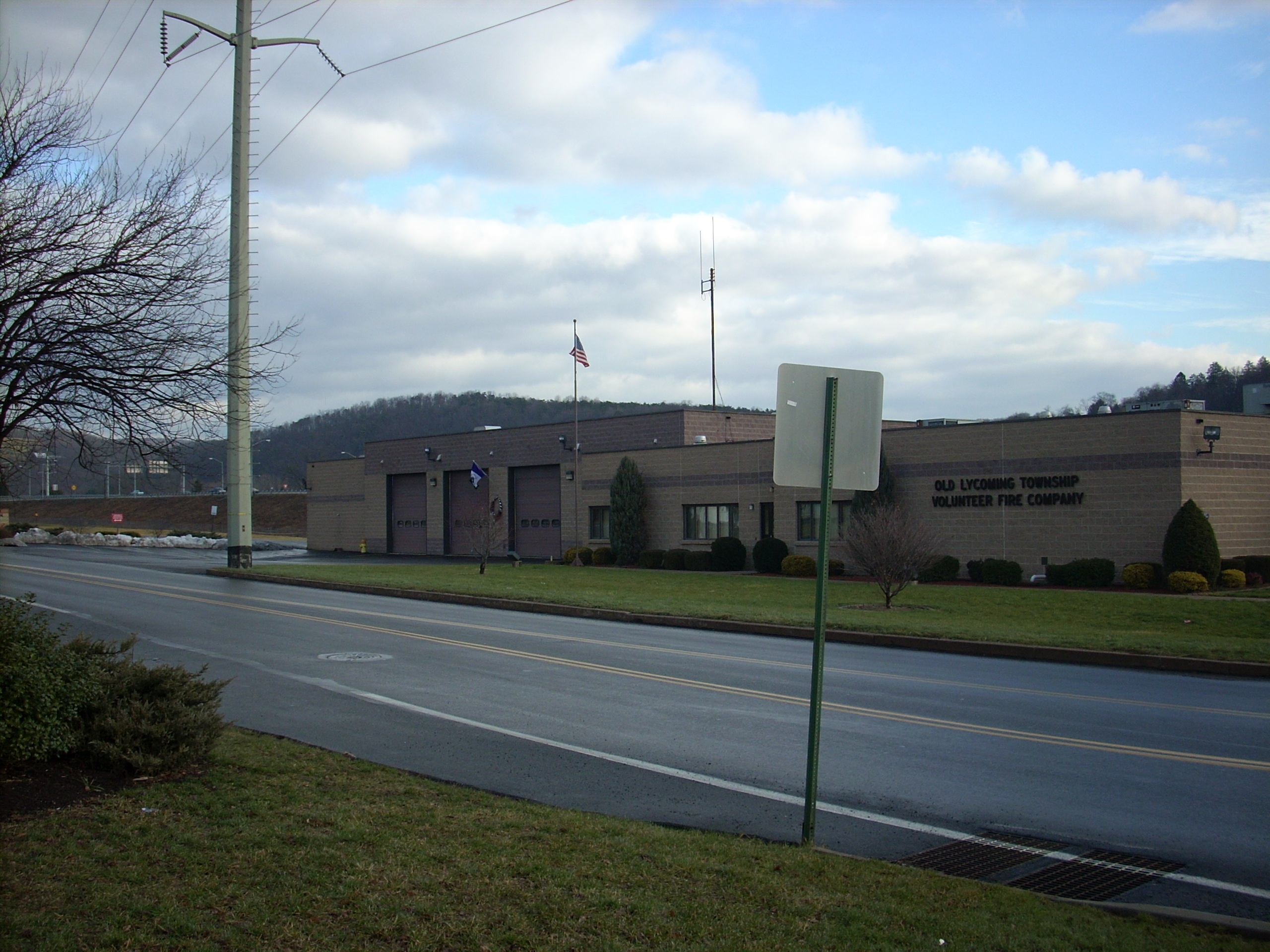
- The Old Lycoming Township municipal building in Garden View

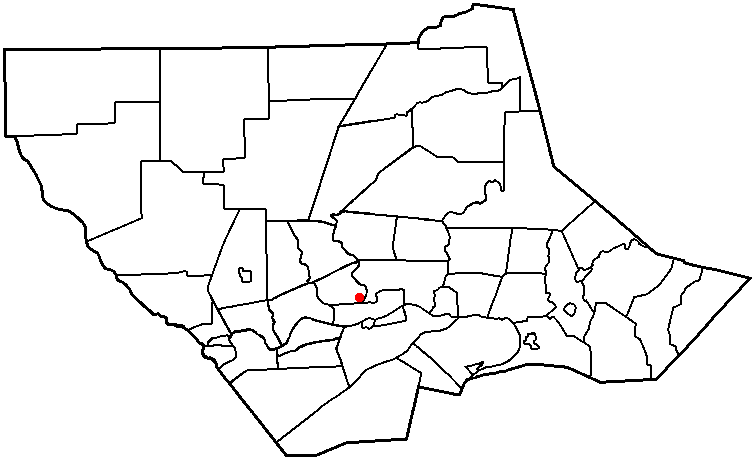
- Map of Lycoming County, Pennsylvania highlighting Garden View

- Map of Lycoming County, Pennsylvania
- Coordinates: 41°15′21″N 77°2′54″W
- Country: United States
- State: Pennsylvania
- County: Lycoming
- Township: Old Lycoming

Area
  - Total: 1.10 sq mi (2.86 km^{2})
  - Land: 1.08 sq mi (2.80 km^{2})
  - Water: 0.023 sq mi (0.06 km^{2})
- Elevation: 548 ft (167 m)

Population (2020)
  - Total: 2,478
  - Density: 2,290.1/sq mi (884.22/km^{2})
- Time zone: UTC-5 (Eastern (EST))
  - Summer (DST): UTC-4 (EDT)
- ZIP code: 17701
- Area codes: 272 and 570
- FIPS code: 42-28456
- GNIS feature ID: 1175436

Garden View is a census-designated place (CDP) in Lycoming County, Pennsylvania, United States. The population was 2,503 at the 2010 census. It is part of the Williamsport Metropolitan Statistical Area.

== Geography ==
Garden View is located south of the center of Lycoming County at 41°15′21″N 77°2′54″W (41.255859, -77.048425), in the southeastern corner of Old Lycoming Township. It is bordered to the south by the city of Williamsport and to the east, across Lycoming Creek, by Loyalsock Township.

According to the United States Census Bureau, the CDP has a total area of 1.1 square miles (2.8 km^{2}), of which 0.02 square miles (0.06 km^{2}), or 2.16%, are water. Via Lycoming Creek, the community is part of the West Branch Susquehanna River watershed.

== Demographics ==
Historical population
Census	Pop.	Note	%±
2020	2,478		—
U.S. Decennial Census

As of the census of 2000, there were 2,679 people, 1,207 households, and 738 families residing in the CDP. The population density was 2,602.1 inhabitants per square mile (1,004.7/km^{2}). There were 1,269 housing units at an average density of 1,232.6 per square mile (475.9/km^{2}). The racial makeup of the CDP was 95.89% White, 1.12% African American, 0.11% Native American, 1.34% Asian, 0.37% from other races, and 1.16% from two or more races. Hispanic or Latino of any race were 0.45% of the population.

There were 1,207 households, out of which 22.7% had children under the age of 18 living with them, 49.5% were married couples living together, 8.4% had a female householder with no husband present, and 38.8% were non-families. 33.2% of all households were made up of individuals, and 13.8% had someone living alone who was 65 years of age or older. The average household size was 2.21 and the average family size was 2.81.

In the CDP, the population was spread out, with 20.0% under the age of 18, 8.1% from 18 to 24, 26.6% from 25 to 44, 25.4% from 45 to 64, and 20.0% who were 65 years of age or older. The median age was 42 years. For every 100 females, there were 97.0 males. For every 100 females age 18 and over, there were 92.8 males.

The median income for a household in the CDP was $36,118, and the median income for a family was $42,383. Males had a median income of $37,162 versus $21,982 for females. The per capita income for the CDP was $17,945. About 11.9% of families and 13.0% of the population were below the poverty line, including 33.7% of those under age 18 and 1.7% of those age 65 or over.

== Education ==
It is in the Williamsport Area School District.
