= Daniel Hughes (underground railroad) =

American barge operator (1804–1880)

- Born: 1804; Oswego County, New York
- Died: 1880 (aged 75–76); Williamsport, Pennsylvania
- Occupations: Lumber raftsman and Underground Railroad conductor
- Height: 6 ft 8 in (2.03 m)
- Spouse: Ann Rotch
- Children: 16

Daniel Hughes (1804–1880) was a conductor, agent and station master in the Underground Railroad based in Loyalsock Township, Lycoming County, Pennsylvania in the United States. He was the owner of a barge on the Pennsylvania Canal and transported lumber from Williamsport on the West Branch Susquehanna River to Havre de Grace, Maryland. Hughes hid runaway slaves in the hold of his barge on his return trip up the Susquehanna River to Lycoming County, where he provided shelter to the runaways on his property near the Loyalsock Township border with Williamsport before they moved further north and to eventual freedom in Canada. Hughes' home was located in a hollow or small valley in the mountains just north of Williamsport. This hollow is now known as Freedom Road, having previously been called Nigger Hollow. In response to the actions of concerned African American citizens of Williamsport, the pejorative name was formally changed by the Williamsport City Council in 1936.

Hughes was a man of a mixed racial background. The census of 1850 designated him as a mulatto. He was at least part Mohawk. He was a giant for his time, standing 6 feet 8 inches and weighing as much as 300 pounds. Hughes moved to Williamsport in 1828 and married a local African American freewoman, Ann Rotch. According to the 1850 census, she too was mulatto. His work on the river and canals gave him an opportunity to take an important role in the Underground Railroad. Hughes' barge and home provided a safe haven for the fugitive slaves. His property in the hills north of Williamsport was in a densely wooded area that was covered with vines. A series of caves under the Hughes property provided further cover for the runaway slaves.

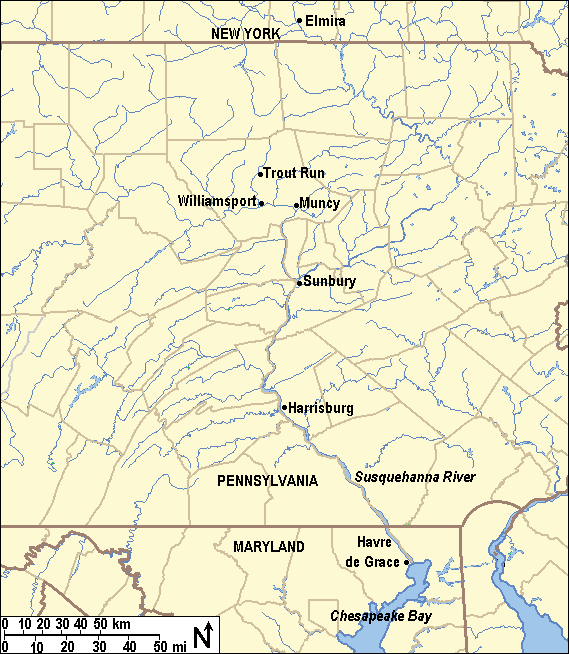
Map of Maryland, Pennsylvania, and New York showing important locations in Hughes' Underground Railroad work

Although Daniel Hughes operated in an area of the United States where slavery had long since been banned, this did not mean that many of his neighbors and townsfolk agreed with his stance on slavery. Hughes, his wife and 16 children had to take care in hiding their work to liberate the slaves. The Fugitive Slave Law of 1850 allowed slave catchers to pursue runaway slaves into the Northern states when they had been previously, under the Fugitive Slave Law of 1793, forced to stop at the Mason–Dixon line. Allowing slave catchers to pursue runaways into the northern states made life more dangerous and difficult for all conductors on the Underground Railroad, including Hughes.

The Freedom Road Cemetery Historical Marker

Racial tensions in Lycoming County were also at a high in the years following the Muncy Abolition Riot of 1842. Hughes was forced to lead the slaves under the cover of darkness. Local bounty hunters and professional slave catchers from the south sought to capture any slaves that they could. Hughes and his sons tried to work on moonless nights. They also would stretch horse hairs across the trails; the horse hairs were difficult to see, and would cause the slave catchers to be thrown off the backs of their horses, either slowing their pursuit or deterring it entirely. Hughes led the fugitive slaves from his home to the next station in Lewis Township near the hamlet of Trout Run on Lycoming Creek. From there the slaves would work their way north to Elmira, New York and eventually to freedom in Canada.

Daniel Hughes' son, Robert, recalled many details of his experiences on the Underground Railroad in his later years. He said about the runaways, "We would hide them in the woods in brush houses. I was just a little boy, but I remember very well carrying meals out to them in the woods. They usually traveled in groups of two or three men. Often patrollers would come to our place looking for runaways. They never caught anyone at our place. Rich people and good people in Williamsport, mostly Quakers helped in the work."

Freedom Road Cemetery

Daniel Hughes also contributed to the African American community in Williamsport by donating some of his land for use as a cemetery. There are nine African Veterans of the American Civil War buried in the cemetery that is commemorated by a Pennsylvania Historical Marker. Hughes is buried in an unmarked grave, according to his wishes, at the cemetery.
