= Faxon, Pennsylvania =

Unincorporated community in Pennsylvania, US

- Census-designated place
- Location within Pennsylvania Location within the United States
- Coordinates: 41°15′18″N 76°58′33″W
- Country: United States
- State: Pennsylvania
- County: Lycoming
- Township: Loyalsock

Area
  - Total: 0.47 sq mi (1.23 km^{2})
  - Land: 0.47 sq mi (1.23 km^{2})
  - Water: 0 sq mi (0.00 km^{2})
- Elevation: 537 ft (164 m)

Population (2020)
  - Total: 1,445
  - Density: 3,053.6/sq mi (1,179.01/km^{2})
- Time zone: UTC-5 (Eastern (EST))
  - Summer (DST): UTC-4 (EDT)
- ZIP code: 17701
- Area code: 570
- FIPS code: 42-25424
- GNIS feature ID: 1192453

Faxon is a census-designated place (CDP) in Loyalsock Township, Pennsylvania, United States. As of the 2010 census, it had a population of 1,395. Faxon is not a separately incorporated community, but is a part of Loyalsock Township (which is a municipality under Pennsylvania law).

Faxon is bordered by the city of Williamsport to the west, Four Mile Drive to the north, Miller Run and the CDP of Kenmar to the east, and Interstate 180 to the south.

There was a CDP named Faxon in Lycoming County before, but it lost that status in the 1990 Census.

== Demographics ==
Historical population
Census	Pop.	Note	%±
2020	1,445		—
U.S. Decennial Census

== Education ==
It is in the Loyalsock Township School District.
