= Kenmar, Pennsylvania =

Unincorporated community in Pennsylvania, US

- Census-designated place
- Location within Pennsylvania Location within the United States
- Coordinates: 41°15′12″N 76°57′33″W
- Country: United States
- State: Pennsylvania
- County: Lycoming
- Township: Loyalsock

Area
  - Total: 2.06 sq mi (5.33 km^{2})
  - Land: 2.05 sq mi (5.31 km^{2})
  - Water: 0.0077 sq mi (0.02 km^{2})
- Elevation: 530 ft (160 m)

Population (2020)
  - Total: 4,241
  - Density: 2,070.3/sq mi (799.36/km^{2})
- Time zone: UTC-5 (Eastern (EST))
  - Summer (DST): UTC-4 (EDT)
- Area code: 570
- FIPS code: 42-39280
- GNIS feature ID: 1192706

Kenmar is a census-designated place (CDP) in Loyalsock Township, Pennsylvania, United States. As of the 2010 census, it had a population of 4,124. Kenmar is not a separately incorporated community, but is a part of Loyalsock Township (which is a municipality under Pennsylvania law).

Kenmar is bordered by Four Mile Drive to the north, Miller Run and the CDP of Faxon to the west, Interstate 180 to the south, and Loyalsock Creek and the borough of Montoursville to the east.

Kenmar is east of Faxon; there was a previous CDP named "East Faxon" in Lycoming County, but it lost its status as a CDP in the 1990 Census.

== Demographics ==
Historical population
Census	Pop.	Note	%±
2020	4,241		—
U.S. Decennial Census

=== 2020 census ===
As of the 2020 census, Kenmar had a population of 4,241. The median age was 46.6 years. 20.7% of residents were under the age of 18 and 28.3% of residents were 65 years of age or older. For every 100 females there were 80.8 males, and for every 100 females age 18 and over there were 76.8 males age 18 and over.

100.0% of residents lived in urban areas, while 0.0% lived in rural areas.

There were 1,910 households in Kenmar, of which 26.1% had children under the age of 18 living in them. Of all households, 39.8% were married-couple households, 16.6% were households with a male householder and no spouse or partner present, and 37.0% were households with a female householder and no spouse or partner present. About 37.6% of all households were made up of individuals and 21.8% had someone living alone who was 65 years of age or older.

There were 2,035 housing units, of which 6.1% were vacant. The homeowner vacancy rate was 2.2% and the rental vacancy rate was 6.0%.

Racial composition as of the 2020 census
Race	Number	Percent
White	3,584	84.5%
Black or African American	291	6.9%
American Indian and Alaska Native	4	0.1%
Asian	92	2.2%
Native Hawaiian and Other Pacific Islander	3	0.1%
Some other race	33	0.8%
Two or more races	234	5.5%
Hispanic or Latino (of any race)	58	1.4%

== Education ==
It is in the Loyalsock Township School District.
