= Muncy Abolition riot of 1842 =

Riot in Muncy, Pennsylvania

The Muncy Abolition riot of 1842 occurred in April 1842 in Muncy, Lycoming County, Pennsylvania in the United States. The riot started as an attack on a schoolhouse where an abolitionist speaker, invited by local Quakers, spoke against slavery.

The speaker and his host, Enos Hawley, were then attacked as they fled to Hawley's house. Eighteen men were initially arrested and charged for the riot. Thirteen men were convicted for their actions in the riot, but were ultimately pardoned by Pennsylvania Governor David R. Porter.

== Background ==
The process of banning slavery in Pennsylvania began in 1780, when the Pennsylvania General Assembly passed a law to slowly abolish it. The new law stated that all people who were slaves in 1780 were to remain slaves until they were freed by their owners and that all children of slaves would remain as slaves until they reached the age of 28. This slow abolition of slavery lasted until 1847 (67 years) when it was fully abolished.

The census of 1790 showed that slaves made up one percent of the population of Pennsylvania (for comparison, in New York and New Jersey slaves made up to six percent of the population in the same census). Two cultural influences in Pennsylvania helped keep the numbers of slaves down. The Quaker founders of Pennsylvania were, as a rule, anti-slavery. Their Testimony of Equality held that all people are created equal in the eyes of God.

They believed that since all people embodied the same divine spark, all people deserved equal treatment. Quakers were some of the first to value women as important ministers and to campaign for women's rights. They became leaders in the anti-slavery movement, and were among the first to pioneer humane treatment for the mentally ill and for prisoners. Another group of settlers in early Pennsylvania, the Pennsylvania Dutch, were self-reliant in their beliefs. They avoided the "outside world" as much as possible and had no need for slaves.

This does not mean that all Pennsylvanians of that time were against slavery. Many of the immigrants that followed the Quakers and the various sects of Pennsylvania Dutch were pro-slavery, or at least definitely not abolitionists. They saw freed slaves as competitors for their jobs. One of the common misconceptions about United States history prior to the Civil War is that all the citizens of the northern states were against slavery. In fact many of the "Yankees" were for slavery, especially in states closer to what became the Confederacy, such as Pennsylvania, Ohio and Delaware.

== Riot ==
There were more than a few abolitionists in Pennsylvania and Enos Hawley, a Quaker citizen of Muncy, was one of the most prominent abolitionists in Lycoming County. Hawley, a tanner by trade, was, like most Quakers, a strong supporter of the abolition of slavery. Hawley invited a speaker (whose name is now unknown) to come to Muncy to speak against slavery. This speaker and his speech set off a tremendous riot that lead to the near destruction of a local schoolhouse and the controversial pardoning of the rioters by Pennsylvania Governor David R. Porter.

The abolitionist speaker gave his speech at a one-room school in Muncy in April 1842. During the course of the speech, eighteen men gathered outside the schoolhouse. They began throwing rocks and other debris at the school, breaking all of the windows.

Enos Hawley and the guest speaker were both injured in the assault. Upon fleeing the school, the abolitionists were pelted with eggs. The rioters followed Hawley and his guest to Hawley's home at the corner of High and Main Streets in Muncy. They continued the assault on Hawley's home until after midnight, when the local law enforcement officers were able to quell the riot and arrest the rioters.

== Trial and pardons ==
The rioters were indicted in September and went to trial in October, when thirteen of the eighteen rioters were found guilty as charged. The jury's deliberation was quite a long process. Abraham Updegraff was a member of the jury who was the driving force that led to the conviction of the rioters. Updegraff, an ardent abolitionist who was a vital member of the Underground Railroad in Lycoming County, was able to convince his peers that the rioters deserved to be punished. The first jury vote was eleven to one in favor of acquittal, with Updegraff being the lone dissenter finding the men guilty.

Updegraff argued that "we have been sworn to try this case according to the law and the evidence presented and that if no contradictory evidence offered by the defendants than we could do nothing more than to convict them." He was also able to make his argument in German, which was the native tongue of three other jurors. The second vote was nine finding the men "guilty" to three in favor of acquittal. A third unanimous vote finally resulted in the conviction of thirteen of the eighteen men charged in the Muncy Abolition Riot.

This conviction was essentially overturned by Governor David R. Porter when he pardoned the rioters several days later. Governor Porter's statement of pardon said: "It is represented to me by highly respected citizens of Lycoming County, that this prosecution was instituted more with a view to the accomplishment of political ends than to serve the cause of law and order."

Porter's pardon message placed the blame for the riot on the abolitionist speaker. Porter stated that the speech was "notoriously offensive to the minds of those to whom they were addressed and were calculated to bring about a breach of the peace." This pardon led to Governor Porter being given the less than flattering nicknames of the "Previous Pardon Porter" and "The Pardoning Governor." Historians believe that Porter pardoned the rioters under rampant political pressure regarding the issue of slavery, as was often the case in the years prior to the Civil War.
