= Williamsport Area School District =

School district in Pennsylvania

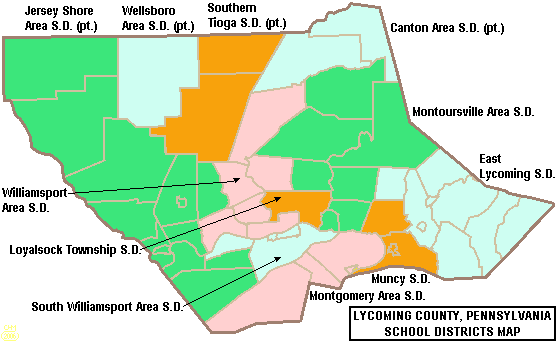

Address
- 2780 West Fourth Street Williamsport, Lycoming, Pennsylvania, 17701; United States

District information
- Type: Public

Students and staff
- District mascot: Millionaires
- Colors: Cherry & White

Other information
- Website: www.wasd.org

The Williamsport Area School District is a large, urban school district and one of several public school districts in Lycoming County, Pennsylvania, in the United States. The district is centered on the city of Williamsport and also serves the neighboring Lewis, Hepburn, Lycoming, Old Lycoming, and Woodward townships. The district encompasses approximately 98 square miles (250 km^{2}). According to 2000 federal census data, it served a resident population of 44,192. By 2010, the District's population had declined to 41,757 people. The educational attainment levels for the Williamsport Area School District population (25 years old and over) were 85.5% high school graduates and 17.4% college graduates. The district is one of the 500 public school districts of Pennsylvania.

According to the Pennsylvania Budget and Policy Center, 62.5% of the District's pupils lived at 185% or below the Federal Poverty Level as shown by their eligibility for the federal free or reduced price school meal programs in 2012. In 2009, the District residents’ per capita income was $15,693, while the median family income was $37,157. In the Commonwealth, the median family income was $49,501 and the United States median family income was $49,445, in 2010. In Lycoming County, the median household income was $45,430. By 2013, the median household income in the United States rose to $52,100. In 2014, the median household income in the USA was $53,700.

The district currently operates seven schools:

- Cochran Primary School
- Hepburn-Lycoming Primary School
- Jackson Primary School
- Curtin Intermediate School
- Lycoming Valley Intermediate School
- Williamsport Area Middle School
- Williamsport Area High School

The Williamsport Area Middle School building also houses the District Service Center.

The BLaST Intermediate Unit IU17 provides the District with a wide variety of services like specialized education for disabled students and hearing, background checks for employees, state mandated recognizing and reporting child abuse training, speech and visual disability services and criminal background check processing for prospective employees and professional development for staff and faculty.

== Notable alumni ==
Joe Fagnano – American football quarterback
