= Jersey Shore Airport =

Private airport in Pennsylvania

- IATA: none; ICAO: none; FAA LID: P96

Summary
- Airport type: Private
- Serves: Jersey Shore, Pennsylvania
- Location: Nippenose Township, Pennsylvania
- Opened: 1947
- Coordinates: 41°12′23″N 077°13′34″W

Map
- Location in Pennsylvania P96 (the United States)

Runways
Direction	Length		Surface
Direction	ft	m	Surface
9/27	3,059	932	Turf

Statistics (2018)
- Based aircraft: 13
- Aircraft operations: 2,198

Jersey Shore Airport (FAA LID: P96) is a private airport located in Nippenose Township near Antes Fort, Pennsylvania. It serves Jersey Shore, Pennsylvania. In 2018 the Federal Aviation Administration reported the airport had 13 based aircraft including 12 single engine aircraft and 1 helicopter. From a 12 month period ending on May 9, 2019 the airport reported 2,198 aircraft movements and an average of 29 movements per week.

The airport is the second in Lycoming County, located about 25 miles to the east is Williamsport Regional Airport the counties primary commercial airport.

== Accidents and incidents ==
- On August 11, 2019 an experimental built Acro Sport II registered N43032 crashed on approach killing two people. The pilot was a commercial pilot licence holder and the passenger held a private pilot licence. Both were killed instantly. A witness who was working at the airport told investigators the aircraft took off from runway 27 and appeared to be entering left traffic to return to the airport at an altitude of 150 feet. When suddenly the aircraft climbed to approximately 500 or 600 feet before stalling. The aircraft then rolled over its left wing and impacted the ground. Firefighters from Jersey Shore, Nippenose Valley and Antes Fort fire companies responded as well as crews from Jersey Shore Area EMS and Susquehanna Regional EMS. Tiadaghton Valley Regional Police and Pennsylvania State Police also responded. Tiadaghton Valley PD and a local Civil Air Patrol unit held the scene for investigators. On August 12 a go-team from the Federal Aviation Administration arrived on scene. On the afternoon of August 12 crews moved the wreckage to a hangar at the airport for crews to continue to examine.

== See also ==
- List of airports in Pennsylvania
