= UPMC Williamsport Divine Providence Campus =

Coordinates: 41.260039°N 76.984869°W

- UPMC

Geography
- Location: 1100 Grampian Blvd, Williamsport, PA 17701, Loyalsock Township, Pennsylvania, U.S.

Organisation
- Type: Non-emergency

History
- Opened: 1951

Links
- Website: Website

UPMC Williamsport Divine Providence Campus is a non-emergency hospital of UPMC that serves the greater Williamsport, Pennsylvania area. It is located on the border of Loyalsock Township and Williamsport.

== History ==
In the early 1800s, Williamsport was just a small borough along the Susquehanna River. By the 1870s, it had become the lumber capital of the world. The population had grown dramatically, and with this growth came an increased incidence of sickness and injury. The sick were cared for in their homes by family members, and workers who were injured on the job were often treated in the boardinghouse rooms where they lived. Following several industrial accidents that occurred in the early 1870s, members of the Lycoming County Medical Society decided there was a need for a hospital where patients could be fed and cared for in a clean environment. In 1873, upon petition by members of the Lycoming County Medical Society and 23 leading citizens of the community, the Lycoming County Court granted a charter establishing the Williamsport Hospital.

The first hospital in Williamsport opened its doors around April 1, 1878. In the coming hundred or so years, as the population of the area grew and fell, Divine Providence was founded and opened in 1951 as a full-scale emergency hospital and the main care facility in the county. The emergency department was dissolved in the 1990s.

Divine Providence Hospital was part of an alliance of three hospitals that formed Susquehanna Health in 1994. Divine Providence Hospital became of the UPMC network when Susquehanna Health was integrated into the University of Pittsburgh Medical Center (UPMC) on October 18, 2016.

== See also ==
- UPMC Williamsport
- University of Pittsburgh Medical Center
