= Loyalsock Township High School =

Location
- 1801 Loyalsock Drive; Williamsport; Loyalsock Township, Lycoming, Pennsylvania 17701-2829; United States; 41.2608°N 76.9673°W

Information
- Type: Public
- Principal: Stephen Hafele
- Vice Principal: Richard Cummings
- Grades: 9-12
- Enrollment: 440 (2024-25)
- Schedule: 7:40AM - 2:30PM
- Colors: Maroon, White and Carolina Blue
- Athletics conference: PIAA
- Mascot: Lancer
- Nickname: Loyalsock Lancers
- Rivals: Williamsport (Girls and Boys Basketball); Montoursville (Boys Basketball & Football); South Williamsport (Football)
- Communities served: Loyalsock, Pennsylvania
- Website: ltsd.k12.pa.us

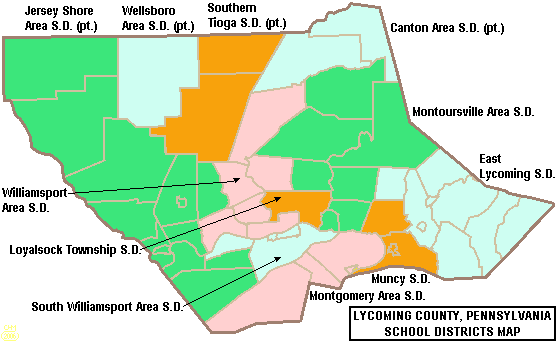
Loyalsock Township School District region in Lycoming County

Loyalsock Township High School (Grades 9–12) is a medium-sized, suburban high school located in Loyalsock Township, Pennsylvania (near the city of Williamsport). As of the 2024–2025 school year, the school reported an enrollment of 440 pupils in grades 9th through 12th.

The Loyalsock HS building is connected to the Loyalsock MS and shares multiple facilities such as the library and cafeteria.

The Loyalsock HS also has multiple modern sport facilities. These facilities include the Kenneth M. Robbins Stadium, which holds football and soccer games. The Loyalsock HS has also built a new gym in 2023, called Lancer Arena, an addition to the high school building. This gym holds sports such as boys and girls basketball.

The mascot for the school is the Lancer, and the school's colors are maroon, white and Carolina blue.

== Sports ==
The sports funded by the district are:

Boys:

- Baseball - AAA
- Basketball- AAA
- Cross Country - AA
- Football - AA
- Golf - AA
- Soccer - AA
- Tennis - AA
- Track and Field - AA
- Wrestling - AA

Girls:

- Basketball - AAA
- Cheer - AA
- Cross Country - AA
- Golf - AA
- Soccer - AA
- Softball - AAA
- Tennis - AA
- Track and Field - AA
- Volleyball - AA

According to PIAA directory March 2026

=== Athletic championships ===
Sport	League Championships	District Championships	Region Championships	State Championships
Baseball	12; 1987, 1989, 1993, 1999, 2000, 2002, 2003, 2005, 2007, 2008, 2013, 2014	5; 2002, 2007, 2008, 2014	4; 2007, 2008, 2013, 2014	3; 2008, 2013, 2014
Boys Basketball	29; 1969, 1970, 1971, 1973, 1978, 1979, 1980, 1981, 1984, 1987, 1988 1989, 1990, 1993, 2000, 2001, 2002, 2003, 2004, 2007, 2008, 2009, 2010, 2011, 2013, 2014, 2015, 2016, 2017, 2018	15; 1971, 1978, 1979, 1988, 1993, 1995, 1996 1999, 2000, 2002, 2004, 2013, 2014, 2016, 2018	2; 1993, 2021	1; 2021
Girls Basketball	12; 1979, 1980, 1987, 1994, 1995, 1996, 1997, 1991, 2002, 2003, 2017, 2018, 2024	4; 1995, 2017, 2018, 2024	1; 2024	1; 2024
Cheer	3; 1993, 1994, 1996	0	0	0
Boys Cross Country	7; 1997, 1998, 1999, 2001, 2002, 2004, 2005	1; 2002	0	0
Girls Cross Country	13; 2001, 2002, 2003, 2004, 2005, 2007, 2008, 2009, 2010, 2011, 2016, 2017, 2018	10; 2001, 2002, 2004, 2005, 2007, 2009, 2010, 2011, 2017, 2018	9; 2002, 2004, 2005, 2007, 2009, 2010, 2011, 2017, 2018	5; 2007, 2009, 2010, 2017 2018
Boys Golf	4; 1996, 2003, 2005, 2009	1; 2009	0	0
Girls Golf	1; 2010	0	0	0
Football	11; 1978, 1983, 1987, 1989, 1994, 1999 2007, 2009, 2016, 2017, 2018	4; 1978, 1989, 2007, 2009, 2017	1; 2009	0
Boys Soccer	4; 1997, 2005, 2006, 2015	1; 1997	0	0
Girls Soccer	9; 2001, 2007, 2008, 2009, 2010 2011, 2012, 2015, 2016	5; 2008, 2009, 2010, 2011, 2015	2; 2009, 2015	1; 2009
Softball	9; 1997, 1998, 2003, 2004, 2005, 2007, 2008, 2010, 2017	7; 1998, 2003, 2005, 2007, 2008 2010, 2017	2; 2007, 2008	1; 2008
Boys Tennis	2; 1997, 2003	1; 2003	0	0
Girls Tennis	0	0	0	0
Boys Track and Field	6; 1967, 1971, 1998, 2005, 2016, 2017	4; 1971, 1998,2016, 2017	0	0
Girls Track and Field	5; 1989, 1993, 1999, 2003, 2009	1; 2009	1; 2009	0
Wrestling	7; 1988, 1991, 1992, 1995, 1997, 2004, 2005	4; 1992, 1997, 2004, 2005	2; 2004, 2005	1; 2004

== Notable alumni ==
- Pat Daneker, retired Major League Baseball pitcher for the Chicago White Sox.
- Lawrence Lessig, Harvard professor and 2016 presidential candidate.
- Dylan Rockoff, singer-songwriter
- Tom Woodruff Jr., Academy Award winning actor, director, producer and special effects supervisor.
- Morgan Myles, featured on The Voice 2022

== See also ==
- Loyalsock Township School District
- List of high schools in Pennsylvania

== Gallery ==
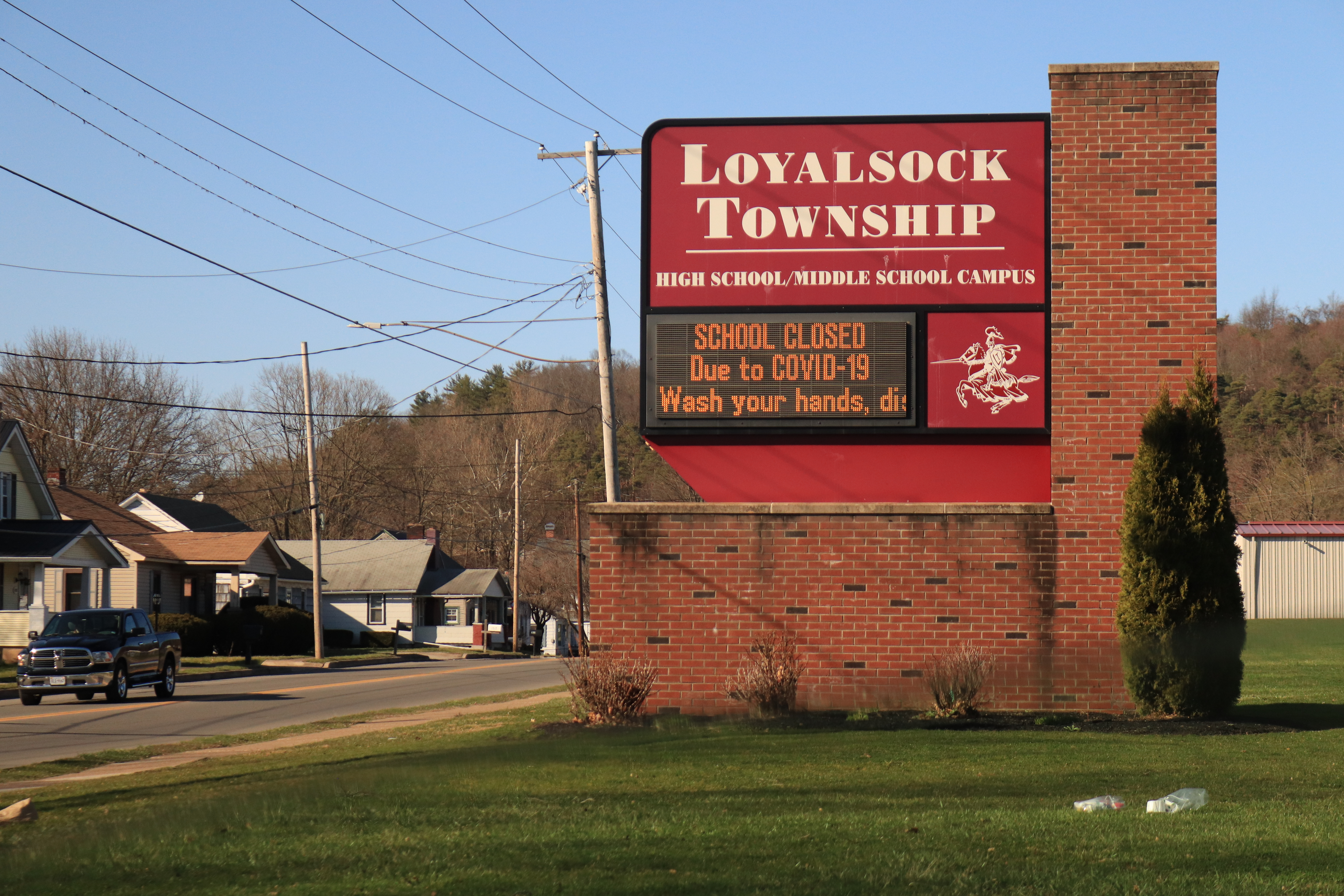
LTHS school sign, 2020

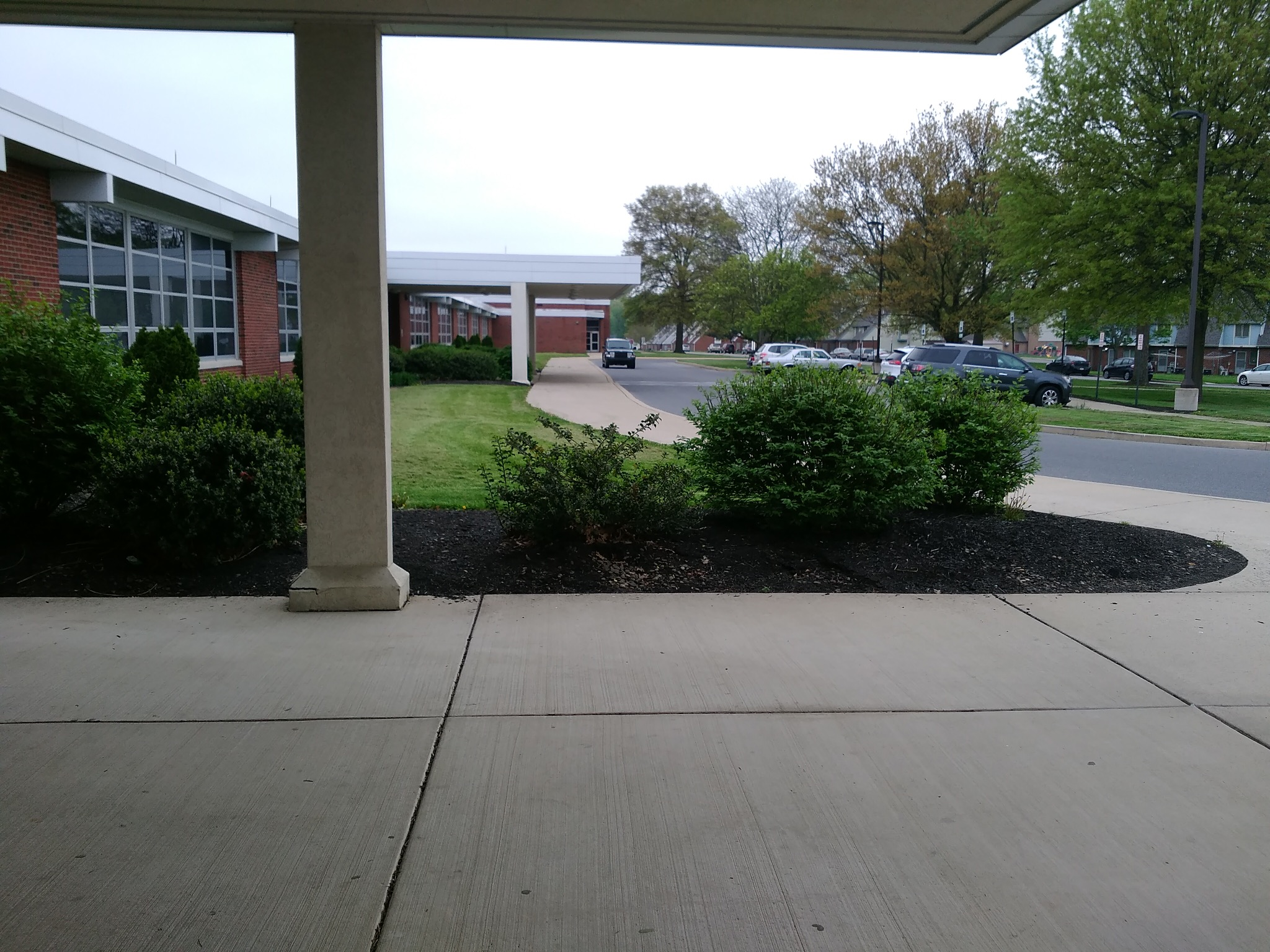
LTHS exterior, 2017

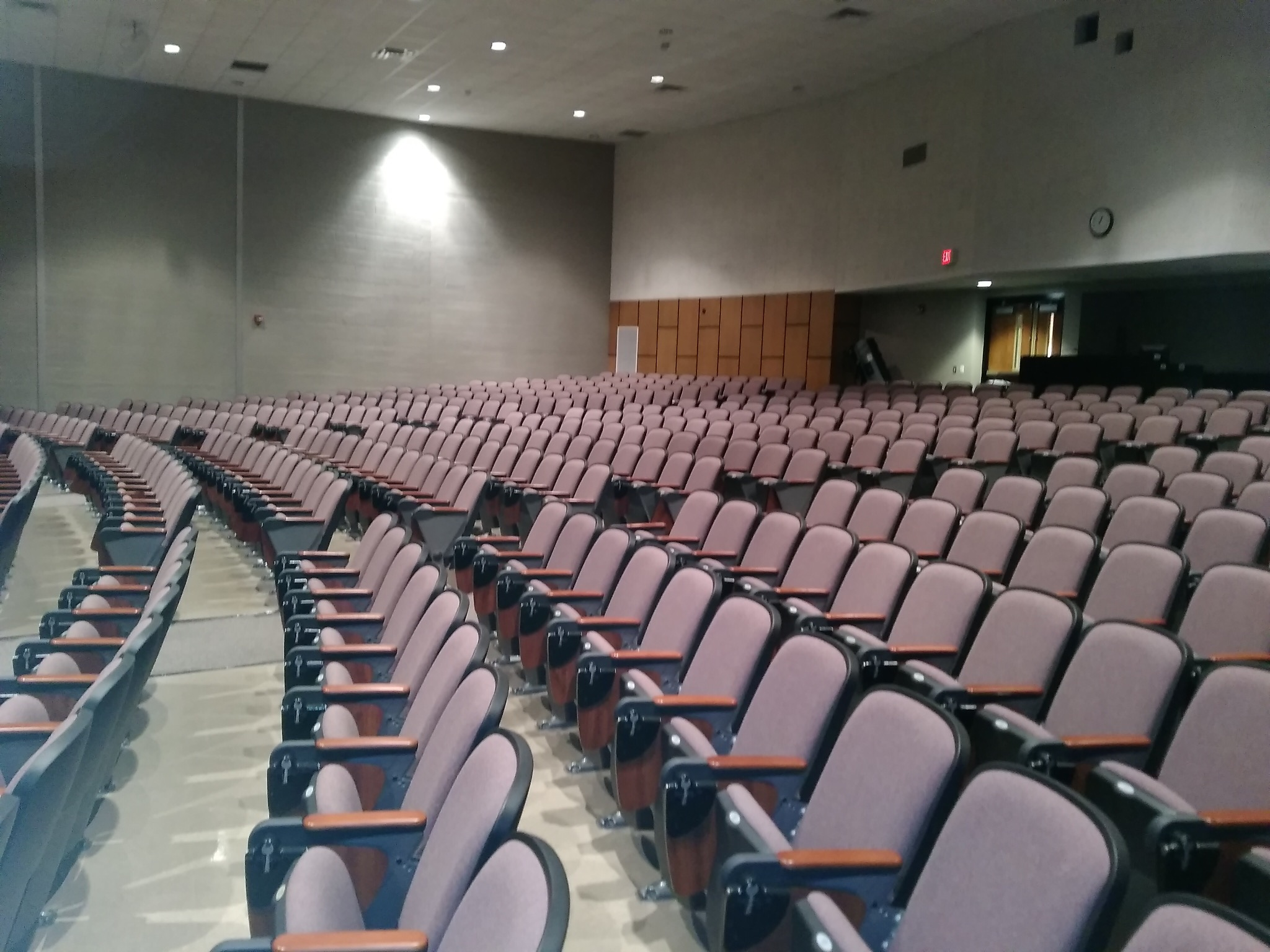
LTHS auditorium, 2017

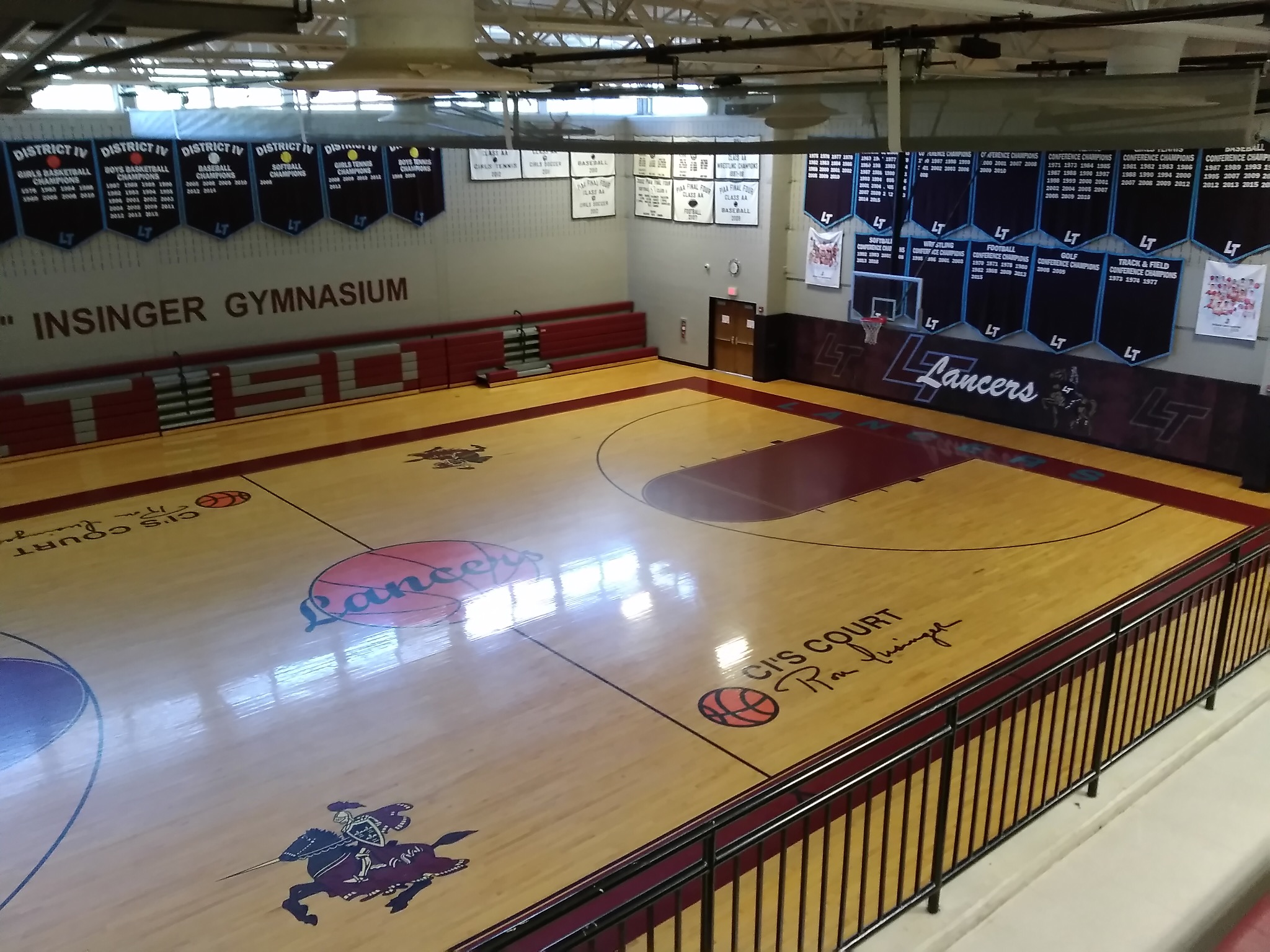
Gymnasium at LTHS
