= Loyalsock Township, Pennsylvania =

Township in Pennsylvania, US

- Township
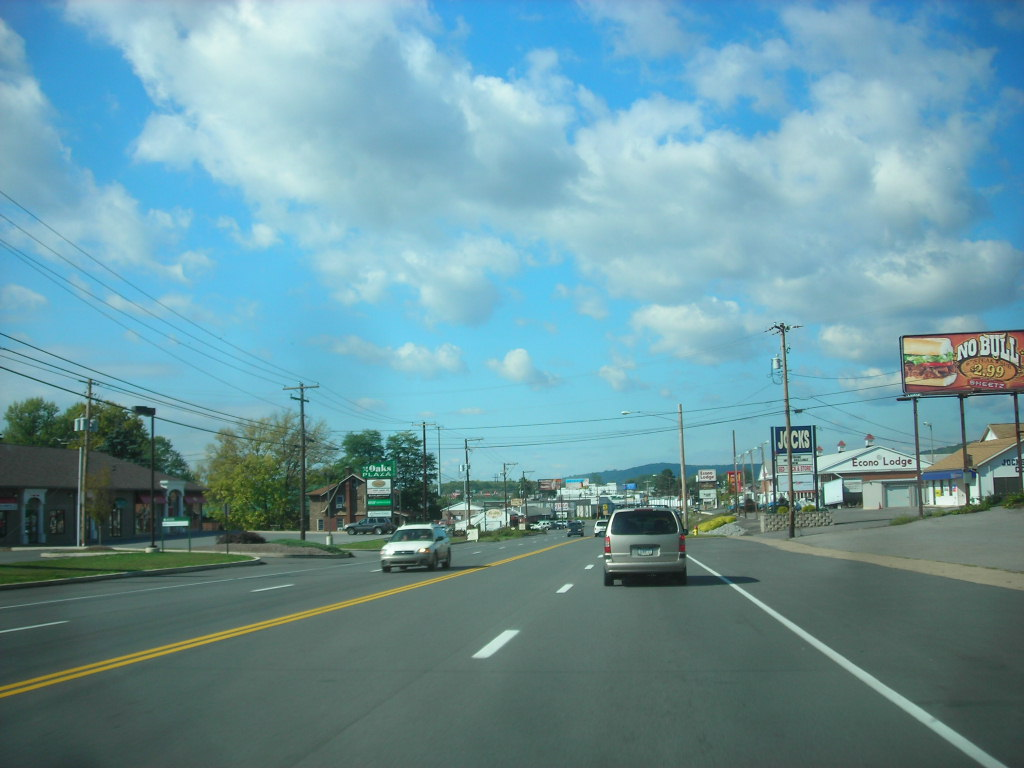
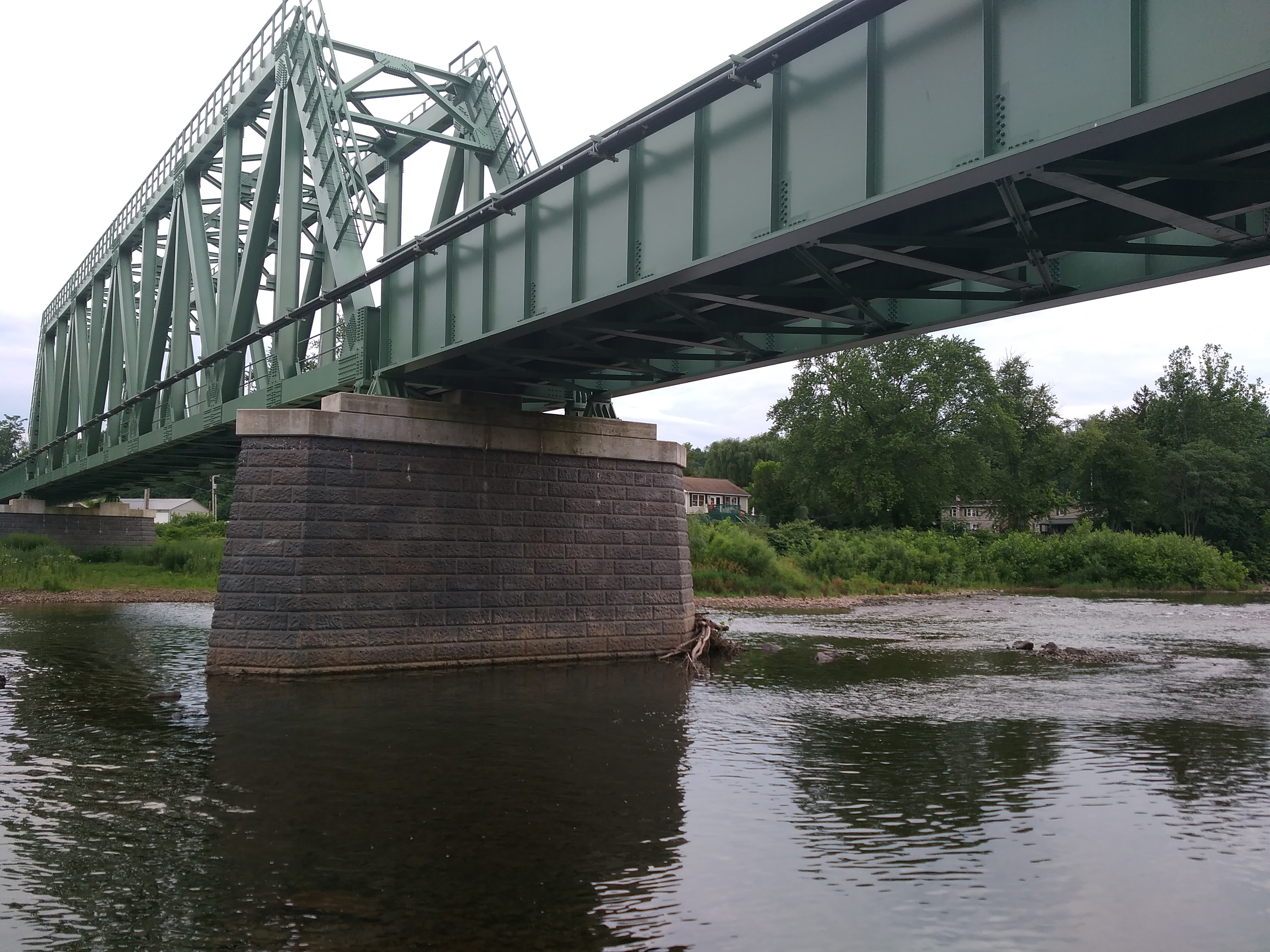
- From top: Golden Strip; Railroad bridge over Loyalsock Creek
- Nicknames: Sock Township, Sock, The Sock
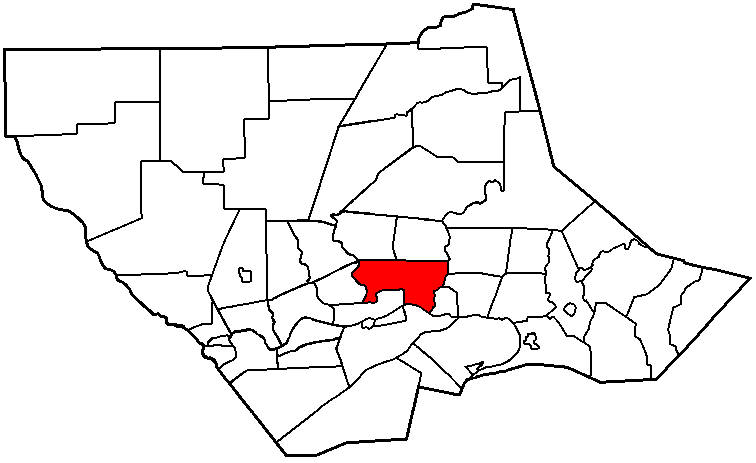
- Location within Lycoming County

- Location in Pennsylvania Loyalsock Township (the United States)
- Coordinates: 41.276°N 76.986°W
- Country: United States
- State: Pennsylvania
- County: Lycoming
- Settled: 1768; 258 years ago
- Incorporated: 1786

Area
  - Total: 21.49 sq mi (55.67 km^{2})
  - Land: 21.15 sq mi (54.78 km^{2})
  - Water: 0.34 sq mi (0.89 km^{2})
- Elevation: 1,719 ft (524 m)

Population (2020)
  - Total: 11,561
  - Density: 527/sq mi (203.5/km^{2})
- Time zone: Eastern (EST)
  - Summer (DST): EDT
- Area code: 570
- FIPS code: 42-081-45224
- Website: www.loyalsocktownshipbos.com

Loyalsock Township is a township in Lycoming County, Pennsylvania, United States. The population was 11,561 at the 2020 census. It is part of the Williamsport Metropolitan Statistical Area. It is the second largest municipality in Lycoming County, in terms of population, behind the county seat, Williamsport.

The township was settled in 1768 and incorporated in 1786. It is located on the north bank of the West Branch Susquehanna River. Native American artifacts can be commonly found in parks near the West Branch. Archaeologists have found over 1,500 pieces of Native American pottery, weaponry and other artifacts, some being displayed in collections in Philadelphia, Pittsburgh, and New York City. Most can be found at local museums in nearby Williamsport.

== History ==
Loyalsock Township was formed from Muncy Township in February 1786 by the Northumberland County court. This was nine years prior to the formation of Lycoming County. The township was originally bounded by the West Branch Susquehanna River to the south, Loyalsock Creek to the east, and Lycoming Creek to the west.

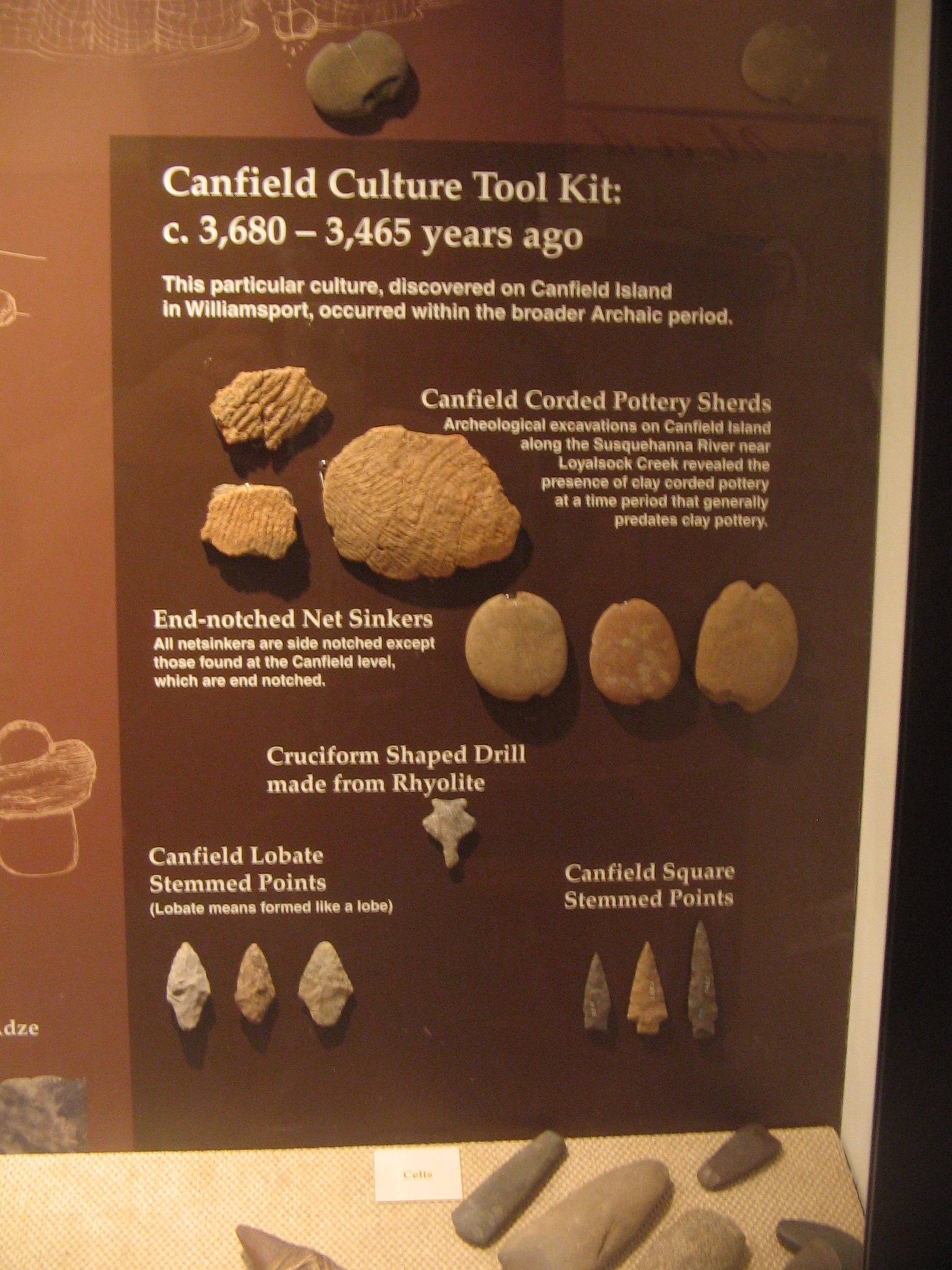
Native American stone tools excavated from Canfield Island in the West Branch Susquehanna River, seen from exhibit at the Lycoming County Historical Museum in Williamsport

In the American Revolutionary War, settlements throughout the Susquehanna valley and what was to become Loyalsock Township were attacked by Loyalists and Native Americans allied with the British. After the Wyoming Valley battle and massacre in the summer of 1778 (near what is now Wilkes-Barre) and smaller local attacks, the "Big Runaway" occurred throughout the West Branch Susquehanna valley. Settlers fled fearing more attacks by the British and their allies. Homes and fields were abandoned, with livestock driven along and a few possessions floated on rafts on the river east to Muncy, then further south to Sunbury. The abandoned property was burnt by the attackers. Some settlers soon returned, only to flee again in the summer of 1779 in the "Little Runaway". Sullivan's Expedition helped stabilize the area and encouraged resettlement, which continued after the war.

Isaac and William McKinney, father and son, built the McKinney Iron Works along Lycoming Creek in western Loyalsock Township between 1825 and 1830, when they built a forge, in an area known as Heshbon Park. Their operation was expanded in 1836 with the construction of an iron furnace and further still in 1841 when a rolling mill was added to the complex. Iron ore was transported from Centre County down the West Branch Susquehanna Valley and up Lycoming Creek to the iron works. The McKinneys' effort was ultimately unsuccessful. The efforts of two more iron masters also failed. The iron works was largely destroyed by a flood in 1865.

Daniel Hughes was a conductor in the Underground Railroad based in Loyalsock Township. He was the owner of a barge on the Pennsylvania Canal and transported lumber from Williamsport down the West Branch and main stem of the Susquehanna River to Havre de Grace, Maryland. Hughes hid runaway slaves in the hold of his barge on his return trip up the Susquehanna to Lycoming County, where he provided shelter on his property near the Loyalsock Township border with Williamsport before they moved further north and to eventual freedom in Canada. Hughes' home was located in a hollow or small valley in the mountains just north of Williamsport. This hollow is now known as "Freedom Road", having previously been called "Nigger Hollow". In response to the actions of concerned African American citizens of Williamsport, the pejorative name was formally changed by the Williamsport City Council in 1936.

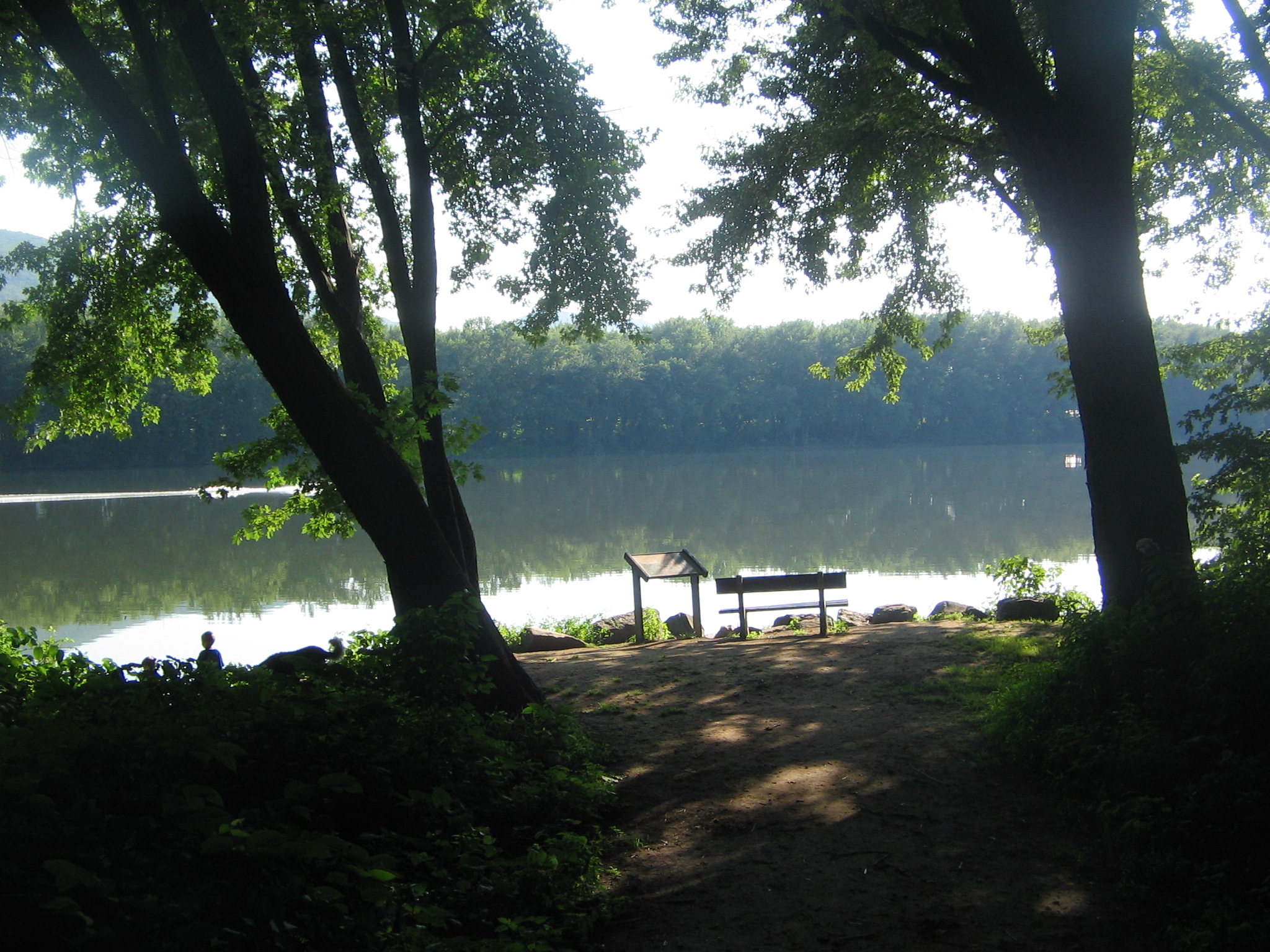
Canfield Island looking out onto the West Branch Susquehanna River in Loyalsock Township in August 2009

Today, the floodplain between Williamsport and Montoursville is densely populated with family residences and a shopping district known as the "Golden Strip" along East Third Street. The northern and western parts of the township are less heavily populated but still there are many family homes and small businesses. The population of Loyalsock Township has grown to 11,026 as of the 2010 census, up from 10,876 at the 2000 census.

== Geography and climate ==
Loyalsock Township is in south-central Lycoming County and is bordered by Montoursville to the southeast, Fairfield Township to the east, and Upper Fairfield Township to the northeast. These eastern borders are formed by Loyalsock Creek, which joins the West Branch Susquehanna River at the township's southeastern corner. The township is bordered by the West Branch of the Susquehanna River and Williamsport to the south (with Armstrong Township south of the river). Lycoming Creek forms the western border of the township, with Old Lycoming Township across the creek. The townships of Hepburn and Eldred form the northern border. The most densely settled part of the township is in the south, comprising the unincorporated communities of Faxon to the west and Kenmar to the east.

The township is 85 miles (137 km) north of Harrisburg, the state capital, 160 miles (260 km) northwest of Philadelphia, 65 miles (105 km) west of Wilkes-Barre, and 77 miles (124 km) south of Elmira, New York.

According to the United States Census Bureau, the township has a total area of 21.5 square miles (55.7 km^{2}), of which 21.2 square miles (54.8 km^{2}) are land and 0.3 square miles (0.9 km^{2}), or 1.60%, are water.

=== Climate ===
Climate data for Williamsport Regional Airport, Pennsylvania (1981–2010 normals, extremes 1895–present)
Month	Jan	Feb	Mar	Apr	May	Jun	Jul	Aug	Sep	Oct	Nov	Dec	Year
Record high °F (°C)	70 (21)	71 (22)	87 (31)	96 (36)	96 (36)	104 (40)	106 (41)	103 (39)	102 (39)	93 (34)	83 (28)	70 (21)	106 (41)
Mean daily maximum °F (°C)	34.2 (1.2)	38.0 (3.3)	47.9 (8.8)	60.9 (16.1)	71.5 (21.9)	79.7 (26.5)	83.6 (28.7)	81.6 (27.6)	73.5 (23.1)	62.0 (16.7)	49.9 (9.9)	38.1 (3.4)	60.1 (15.6)
Mean daily minimum °F (°C)	19.3 (−7.1)	21.4 (−5.9)	28.6 (−1.9)	38.9 (3.8)	47.9 (8.8)	57.6 (14.2)	61.9 (16.6)	60.7 (15.9)	53.1 (11.7)	41.5 (5.3)	33.3 (0.7)	24.3 (−4.3)	40.7 (4.8)
Record low °F (°C)	−20 (−29)	−18 (−28)	−5 (−21)	8 (−13)	28 (−2)	36 (2)	43 (6)	38 (3)	28 (−2)	19 (−7)	3 (−16)	−15 (−26)	−20 (−29)
Average precipitation inches (mm)	2.70 (69)	2.34 (59)	2.97 (75)	3.24 (82)	3.66 (93)	3.92 (100)	4.34 (110)	3.86 (98)	4.16 (106)	3.42 (87)	3.74 (95)	2.93 (74)	41.28 (1,048)
Average snowfall inches (cm)	10.5 (27)	8.8 (22)	6.9 (18)	1.1 (2.8)	0 (0)	0 (0)	0 (0)	0 (0)	0 (0)	0.1 (0.25)	1.7 (4.3)	6.9 (18)	36.0 (91)
Average precipitation days (≥ 0.01 in)	11.0	9.7	11.5	11.6	13.3	11.9	11.4	10.3	10.0	10.3	11.0	10.8	132.8
Average snowy days (≥ 0.1 in)	7.4	5.6	3.5	0.7	0	0	0	0	0	0.1	1.3	5.3	23.9
Source: NOAA

== Demographics ==
Historical population
Census	Pop.	Note	%±
1890	769		—
1900	2,567		233.8%
1910	4,765		85.6%
1920	5,498		15.4%
1930	8,949		62.8%
1940	9,698		8.4%
1950	10,071		3.8%
1960	10,103		0.3%
1970	9,765		−3.3%
1980	9,987		2.3%
1990	10,019		0.3%
2000	10,876		8.6%
2010	11,026		1.4%
2020	11,561		4.9%
2021 (est.)	11,506		−0.5%
U.S. Decennial Census

As of the census of 2000, there were 10,876 people, 4,501 households, and 2,966 families residing in the township. The population density was 517.6 inhabitants per square mile (199.8/km^{2}). There were 4,687 housing units at an average density of 223.1 per square mile (86.1/km^{2}). The racial makeup of the township was 94.81% White, 2.64% African American, 0.13% Native American, 1.05% Asian, 0.01% Pacific Islander, 0.33% from other races, and 1.03% from two or more races. Hispanic or Latino of any race were 0.86% of the population.

There were 4,501 households, out of which 26.1% had children under the age of 18 living with them, 53.5% were married couples living together, 9.5% had a female householder with no husband present, and 34.1% were non-families. Of all households, 31.0% were made up of individuals, and 18.9% had someone living alone who was 65 years of age or older. The average household size was 2.25 and the average family size was 2.80.

In the township the population was spread out, with 20.7% under the age of 18, 5.0% from 18 to 24, 20.7% from 25 to 44, 24.3% from 45 to 64, and 29.4% who were 65 years of age or older. The median age was 47 years. For every 100 females there were 81.6 males. For every 100 females age 18 and over, there were 76.0 males.

The median income for a household in the township was $36,806, and the median income for a family was $47,952. Males had a median income of $39,623 versus $24,684 for females. The per capita income for the township was $23,480. About 6.8% of families and 8.7% of the population were below the poverty line, including 15.7% of those under age 18 and 4.3% of those age 65 or over.

== Transportation ==
=== Major roadways ===
- - Interstate 180
- U.S. Route 220
- East Third Street (Former U.S. Route 220)
- Washington Boulevard
- Four Mile Drive
- Northway Road
- Lycoming Creek Road
- Warrensville Road
- Poco Farm Road
- Bloomingrove Road

The southern part of the township is crossed by Interstate 180, with two exits (Exits 25 and 23) into Loyalsock. I-180 leads west 4 miles (6 km) to its western terminus in Williamsport, and southeast 25 miles (40 km) to Interstate 80 near Milton. U.S. Route 220 runs concurrently with I-180 through the township.

The township has multiple major roadways, most notably East Third Street, which begins in Williamsport to the west and ends at the township's eastern border with Montoursville, where the road name changes to Broad Street. Northway Road begins at Exit 25 off I-180 and continues north until it reaches the township's northern border. Four Mile Drive begins at the township's western border with Williamsport and stretches to Warrensville Road, near the eastern border, and Loyalsock Creek. Four Mile Drive has a mixture of commercial and residential properties, including Donald E. Schick Elementary School and Divine Providence Hospital.

=== Air ===
Located in neighboring Montoursville is Williamsport Regional Airport (KIPT/IPT). On 23 May 2024, Southern Airways Express (SAE) began regular passenger flights 7 days a week from Williamsport to Washington Dulles International Airport.

=== Rail ===
The Lycoming Valley Railroad runs along the West Branch Susquehanna River on the southern border of the township.

== Economy ==
=== Top employers ===
#	Employer	# of Employees
1	Loyalsock School District	209
2	Loyalsock Township	189
3	Liberty Mutual	111
4	Valley Farms Dairy	83
5	UPMC Susquehanna Divine Providence	49

== Education ==
Loyalsock Township School District consists of a high school, middle school and elementary school. All schools in the district rank in the top 150 in the state in test scores and teacher preparedness.

The schools in the district are:

- Donald E. Schick Elementary (formerly known as Four Mile Elementary)
- Loyalsock Township Middle School
- Loyalsock Township High School

Former:

- J George Becht Elementary (1929-2005). Named after Lycoming County Superintendent of Schools 1893-1902 J George Becht.

A lancer is the mascot for the school district. The school colors are maroon, white and Carolina blue. In 2008, 2013 and 2014, the boy's varsity baseball team won the PIAA AA State Championship. In 2021, the boy’s varsity basketball team won the PIAA Class AAA State Championship.

== Public safety ==
=== Police ===
Loyalsock does not have a police department. The township is policed by the Pennsylvania State Police Troop F - Montoursville. Loyalsock School District does however have a police department, the Loyalsock Township School District Police Department, who protect the districts two school complexes during school hours.

=== Fire and rescue ===
Fire department coverage is provided by the Loyalsock Volunteer Fire Company, Lycoming County Station 18. It has an EMS department that staffs one Mobile Intensive Care Unit (MICU) ambulance 24/7, a Basic Life Support ambulance intermittently during the week, and a third reserve Basic Life Support ambulance. Station 18 also provides fire and rescue. Loyalsock VFC houses the counties only Mobile Air unit. They have been in operation since 1925.

== Notable people ==
The following are notable people who were born, lived or currently reside within the township:

- Pat Daneker, former Major League Baseball pitcher
- Bob Farley, former MLB outfielder
- Dylan Rockoff, singer
- Jeff Wheeland, politician
- Tom Woodruff Jr., actor
- Gene Yaw, politician

== See also ==
For histories of the other townships in Lycoming County see:

- History of the Townships of Lycoming County, Pennsylvania
