= Dylan Rockoff =

American singer-songwriter

- Born: September 8, 1994 (age 31); Williamsport, Pennsylvania, U.S.
- Genres: Electronic; Electropop; Rock; Pop rock; Pop
- Occupation: Singer-songwriter
- Instruments: Vocals and guitar
- Label: SunPop

Dylan Rockoff (born September 8, 1994) is an American singer-songwriter. In 2017 Rockoff opened for Bon Jovi during their This House Is Not for Sale Tour in New York City.

== Life and career ==
=== Early life and education ===
Rockoff was born September 8, 1994, in Williamsport, Pennsylvania, and grew up in nearby Loyalsock Township. He attended Loyalsock Township High School where he was an active member in the schools choir, music and drama programs. After graduating high school Rockoff attended Northeastern University in Boston.

=== Musical career ===
In 2017 Rockoff won a Live Nation competition that allowed him to open for Bon Jovi at the Madison Square Garden in New York City.

In 2018, Rockoff was nominated for Boston Artist of the Year by WBUR-FM. In 2019 Rockoff participated in a charity concert in his hometown. Rockoff and several other artists volunteered their time and raised over $35,000 for local pediatric cancer and special needs organizations.

On January 17, 2020, Rockoff released his second studio album Semicolon & Parenthesis. The album saw success it peaked at Number 32 on ITunes Top 100 chart and for a short time number 2 on the iTunes Pop Chart.

Rockoff has performed at venues in Pennsylvania, Massachusetts, New York, New Jersey and Tennessee.

== Personal life ==
Rockoff lives in Nashville, Tennessee. His parents still reside in the Williamsport area where his father is a urologist.

== Discography ==
=== Studio albums ===
| Title | Album details | Peak chart position | |
| Title | Album details | iTunes | US |
|---|---|---|---|
| These Old Streets | Released: April 15, 2016; Format: CD, streaming and digital download | — | — |
| Semicolon & Parenthesis | Released: January 17, 2020; Label: SunPop; Format: CD, streaming and digital download | 32 | 198 |

=== Singles ===
| Title | Year | Album |
|---|---|---|
| "Bad Haircut" | 2019 | Non-album singles |
| "Competition" | 2019 | Non-album singles |
| "Awesome" | 2019 | Non-album singles |
| "Anymore" | 2019 | Non-album singles |
| "You're the One That I Want" | 2019 | Non-album singles |
| "Killing Time" | 2020 | Semicolon & Parenthesis |
