= Old Lycoming Township, Pennsylvania =

Township in Pennsylvania, US

Old Lycoming Township, Lycoming County, Pennsylvania
- Township
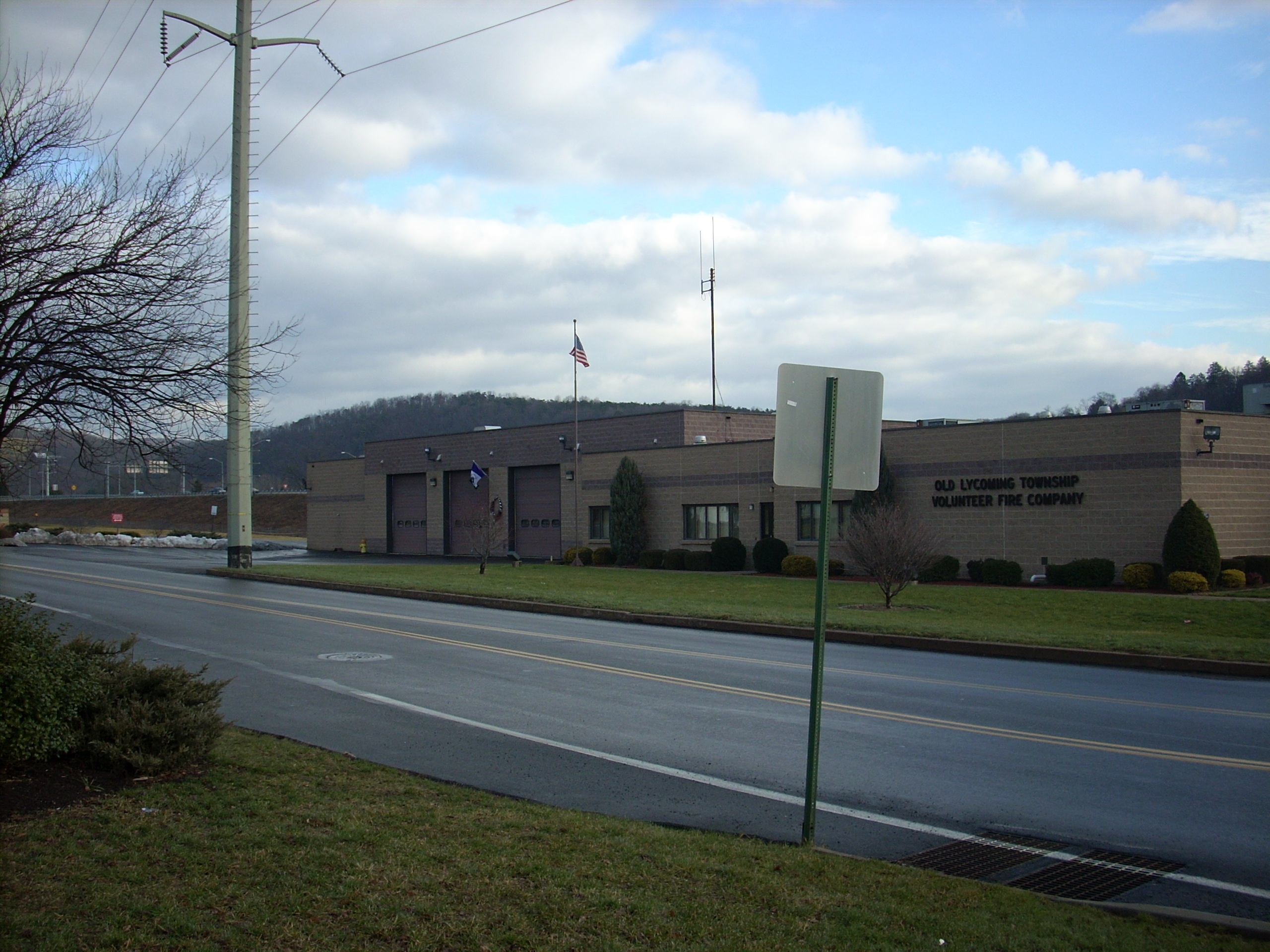
- Old Lycoming Township Volunteer Fire Department and Social Hall 1600 Dewey Avenue, Williamsport, PA 17701

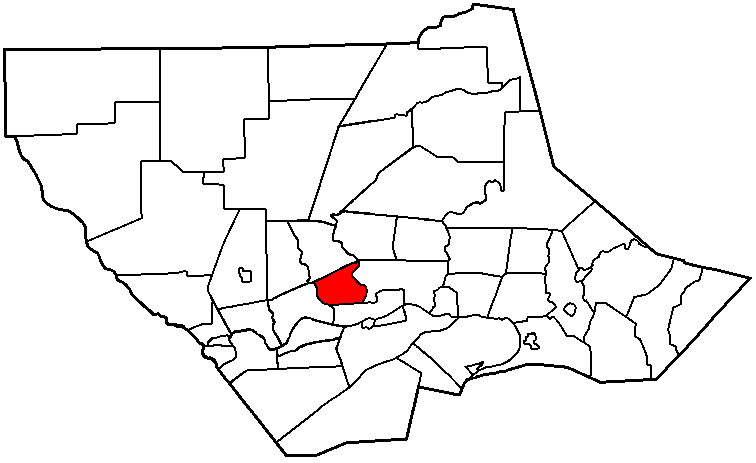
- Map of Lycoming County, Pennsylvania highlighting Old Lycoming Township

- Map of Lycoming County, Pennsylvania
- Coordinates: 41°15′37″N 77°3′24″W
- Country: United States
- State: Pennsylvania
- County: Lycoming
- Settled: 1773
- Incorporated: 1785

Government
  - Type: Second Class Township
  - Chair: Justin Kastner
  - Vice-chair: John Eck
  - Supervisor: Rick Metz

Area
  - Total: 9.44 sq mi (24.45 km^{2})
  - Land: 9.39 sq mi (24.31 km^{2})
  - Water: 0.058 sq mi (0.15 km^{2})
- Elevation: 791 ft (241 m)

Population (2020)
  - Total: 4,973 ▲
  - Estimate (2021): 4,965
  - Density: 533.1/sq mi (205.83/km^{2})
- Time zone: UTC-5 (Eastern (EST))
  - Summer (DST): UTC-4 (EDT)
- ZIP code: 17701
- Area code: 570
- FIPS code: 42-081-56608
- GNIS feature ID: 1216766
- Website: www.oldlycomingtwp.org

Old Lycoming Township is a township in Lycoming County, Pennsylvania, United States. The population was 4,973 at the 2020 census up from 4,938 in 2010. It is part of the Williamsport Metropolitan Statistical Area.

== History ==
Old Lycoming Township is a township in Lycoming County that is actually older than the county. It was formed as part of Northumberland County on August 22, 1785, ten years before the formation of Lycoming County. The original boundaries of the township encompassed much of the territory that was previously governed by the Fair Play Men. The land between Lycoming and Pine creeks was outside of the legal boundaries of Pennsylvania until 1784 and the second Treaty of Fort Stanwix. The Fair Play Men operated a system of self-government from 1773 to 1785. Their claims to the land had no legal bearing in the state of Pennsylvania when it was finally legally part of the state. These men had some troubles gaining the title to the land that they had cleared and so long defended; ultimately, some obtained title to their lands, while others removed westward.

In the American Revolutionary War, settlements throughout the Susquehanna Valley, including what is now Old Lycoming Township, were attacked by Loyalists and Native Americans allied with the British. In the early summer of 1778 news came of a group of Native American warriors, perhaps accompanied by Loyalist and British soldiers, heading for the West Branch Susquehanna River Valley to destroy settlements. There were many smaller incidents of violence against settlers, but on June 10, 1778, a party of sixteen settlers was attacked in what is now Williamsport. In what became known as the "Plum Tree Massacre", twelve of the sixteen were killed and scalped, including two women and six children. The Wyoming Valley Massacre occurred on July 3, 1778 (near what is now Wilkes-Barre). This news caused the local authorities to order the evacuation of the whole West Branch valley.

Most of the settlers did not return to their farms until after Sullivan's Expedition had driven off the Indian and Loyalist threat. John McMeens, a native of South Carolina, was one of the first to return to the area. He had settled along the river in 1776. He fled during the Big Runaway and returned in 1791. McMeens rose to a position of prominence in Lycoming County. He was a county commissioner, state commissioner, and member of the initial committee that explored to possibility of building the Pennsylvania Canal that improved navigation on the Susquehanna River. McMeens also represented the area in the Pennsylvania General Assembly from 1814 to 1818.

Derick Updegraff arrived in Old Lycoming Township from York County, Pennsylvania, in 1787. He settled on land that had previously been improved during the Fair Play Men era. He was not able to claim legal control of his 500 acres (2.0 km^{2}) until 1793 as the result of a lawsuit over the land filed by the man who had previously claimed it. Updegraff and his sons improved the land by clearing many more acres and building what was one of the largest barns in Lycoming County.

Today Old Lycoming Township includes the census designated area of Garden View, a suburb to Williamsport with many family homes and an extensive stretch of commercial and light industrial development along Lycoming Creek Road.

== Geography ==
Old Lycoming Township is in central Lycoming County and is bordered by Lycoming Township to the north, Loyalsock Township to the east, the Newberry section of Williamsport to the south, and Woodward Township to the west. The eastern border of Old Lycoming Township is formed by Lycoming Creek. U.S. Route 15, the Appalachian Thruway, crosses the east side of the township in the Lycoming Creek valley, with access from Exit 137 at the southern border of the township, serving Garden View, and from Exit 140 at the northern border, serving the neighborhood of Woodlawn Park.

According to the United States Census Bureau, the township has a total area of 9.5 square miles (24.5 km^{2}), of which 9.4 square miles (24.3 km^{2}) are land and 0.04 square miles (0.1 km^{2}), or 0.61%, are water. Lycoming Creek, on the eastern border of the township, is a south-flowing tributary of the West Branch Susquehanna River. While most of the township drains to Lycoming Creek, the southwest part of the township drains to Daugherty Run, a separate south-flowing tributary of the West Branch.

== Demographics ==
Historical population
Census	Pop.	Note	%±
2010	4,938		—
2020	4,973		0.7%
2021 (est.)	4,965		−0.2%
U.S. Decennial Census

As of the census of 2000, there were 5,508 people, 2,280 households, and 1,589 families residing in the township. The population density was 583.4 inhabitants per square mile (225.3/km^{2}). There were 2,369 housing units at an average density of 250.9 per square mile (96.9/km^{2}). The racial makeup of the township was 97.39% White, 0.84% African American, 0.16% Native American, 0.78% Asian, 0.18% from other races, and 0.65% from two or more races. Hispanic or Latino of any race were 0.24% of the population.

There were 2,280 households, out of which 26.3% had children under the age of 18 living with them, 59.3% were married couples living together, 6.9% had a female householder with no husband present, and 30.3% were non-families. 25.7% of all households were made up of individuals, and 11.4% had someone living alone who was 65 years of age or older. The average household size was 2.40 and the average family size was 2.88.

In the township the population was spread out, with 21.9% under the age of 18, 6.6% from 18 to 24, 26.4% from 25 to 44, 26.7% from 45 to 64, and 18.5% who were 65 years of age or older. The median age was 42 years. For every 100 females there were 98.7 males. For every 100 females age 18 and over, there were 93.9 males.

The median income for a household in the township was $39,852, and the median income for a family was $46,429. Males had a median income of $37,116 versus $21,935 for females. The per capita income for the township was $19,236. About 6.6% of families and 8.2% of the population were below the poverty line, including 17.3% of those under age 18 and 3.6% of those age 65 or over.
