= Pat Daneker =

American baseball player (born 1976)

- Pitcher
- Born: January 14, 1976 (age 50); Williamsport, Pennsylvania, U.S.
- Batted: Right Threw: Right

MLB debut
- July 2, 1999, for the Chicago White Sox

Last MLB appearance
- July 19, 1999, for the Chicago White Sox

MLB statistics
- Win–loss record: 0–0
- Earned run average: 4.20
- Strikeouts: 5
- Stats at Baseball Reference

Teams
- Chicago White Sox (1999)

Patrick Rees Daneker (born January 14, 1976) is a former pitcher in Major League Baseball. He played for the Chicago White Sox in 1999.

== Amateur career ==
A native of Williamsport, Pennsylvania, Daneker attended Loyalsock Township High School and the University of Virginia. In 1995 and 1996, he played collegiate summer baseball with the Wareham Gatemen of the Cape Cod Baseball League and was named a league all-star in 1995.

== Professional career ==
Daneker was selected by the Chicago White Sox in the fifth round of the 1997 MLB draft and appeared in three major league games for Chicago in 1999.

== Coaching career ==
In 2011, Daneker was hired to be the pitching coach for the Southern Maryland Blue Crabs.
