= Loyalsock Township School District =

School district in Pennsylvania

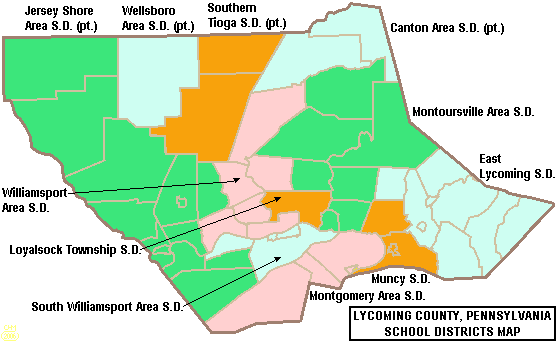

Address
- 1605 Four Mile Drive Williamsport, Pennsylvania, Lycoming, Pennsylvania, 17701; United States

District information
- Type: Public

Students and staff
- District mascot: Lancer
- Colors: Maroon, white & Carolina blue

Other information
- Website: www.ltsd.k12.pa.us

The Loyalsock Township School District is a small, suburban public school district in Lycoming County, Pennsylvania, in the United States. The district is one of the 500 public school districts of Pennsylvania. The district is coterminous with Loyalsock Township, a suburb of Williamsport. Loyalsock Township School District encompasses approximately 21 square miles (54 km^{2}). According to 2000 federal census data, it served a resident population of 10,876. By 2010, the district's population increased to 11,029 people. The educational attainment levels for the Loyalsock Township School District population (25 years old and over) were 91% high school graduates and 27.6% college graduates.

According to the Pennsylvania Budget and Policy Center, 29.2% of the district's pupils lived at 185% or below the Federal Poverty Level as shown by their eligibility for the federal free or reduced price school meal programs in 2012. In 2013, the Pennsylvania Department of Education, reported that fewer than 10 students in the Loyalsock Township School District were homeless. The Loyalsock Township School District residents' per capita income in 2009 was $23,480, while the median family income was $47,952. In Lycoming County, the median household income was $45,430. In the Commonwealth, the median family income was $49,501 and the United States median family income was $49,445, in 2010. In 2013, the median household income in the United States rose to $52,100. By 2014, the median household income in the USA was $53,700.

The district operates three schools: Donald E. Schick Elementary, Loyalsock Township Middle School, and Loyalsock Township High School. The middle and high school (grades 6-12) share a single campus. High school students may choose to attend Lycoming Career and Technology Center for training in the construction and mechanical trades, child care, allied health services and culinary arts. The BLaST Intermediate Unit IU17 provides the district with a wide variety of services like: specialized education for disabled students; impaired hearing, speech and visual disability services and professional development for staff and faculty.

== Extracurriculars ==
The Loyalsock Township School District offers a variety of clubs, activities and an extensive sports program.

=== Sports ===
The sports programs are through the Pennsylvania Heartland Athletic Conference and the Pennsylvania Interscholastic Athletic Association. The Pennsylvania Heartland Athletic Conference is a voluntary association of 25 PIAA High Schools within the central Pennsylvania region. Their mascot is a lancer and colors are maroon, white, and Carolina blue.

The district funds:

Boys

- Baseball - AA
- Basketball- AAA
- Cross Country - A
- Football - AA
- Golf - AAA
- Soccer - A
- Tennis - AA
- Track and Field - AA
- Wrestling - AA

Girls

- Basketball - AA
- Cross Country - A
- Golf - AA
- Soccer (Fall) - AA
- Softball - AA
- Girls' Tennis - AAA
- Track and Field - AA

Middle School Sports:

Boys

- Basketball
- Football
- Soccer
- Wrestling

Girls

- Basketball
- Softball

According to PIAA directory July 2012
