= Lycoming County, Pennsylvania =

County in Pennsylvania, United States

- County
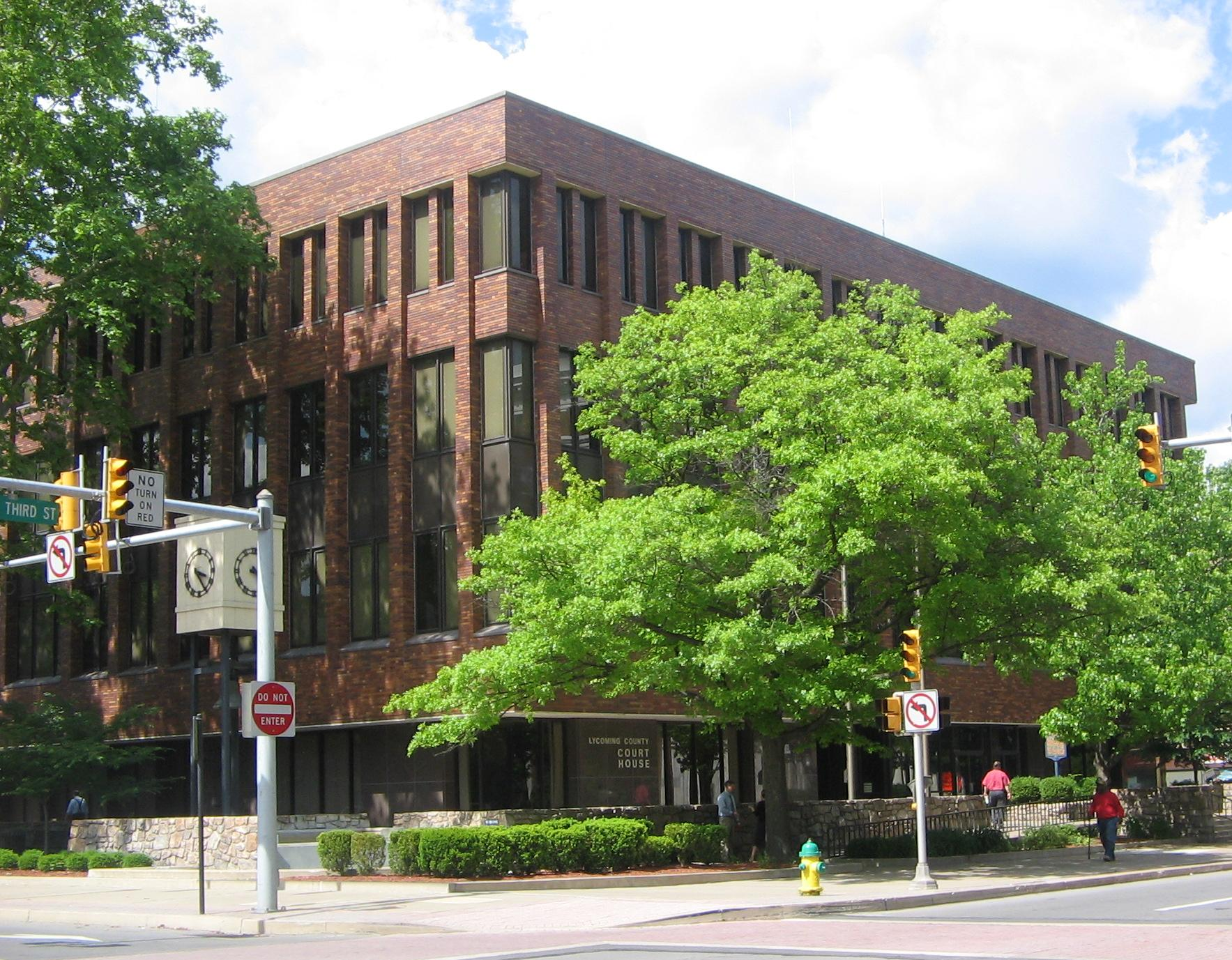
- The Lycoming County Courthouse in Williamsport

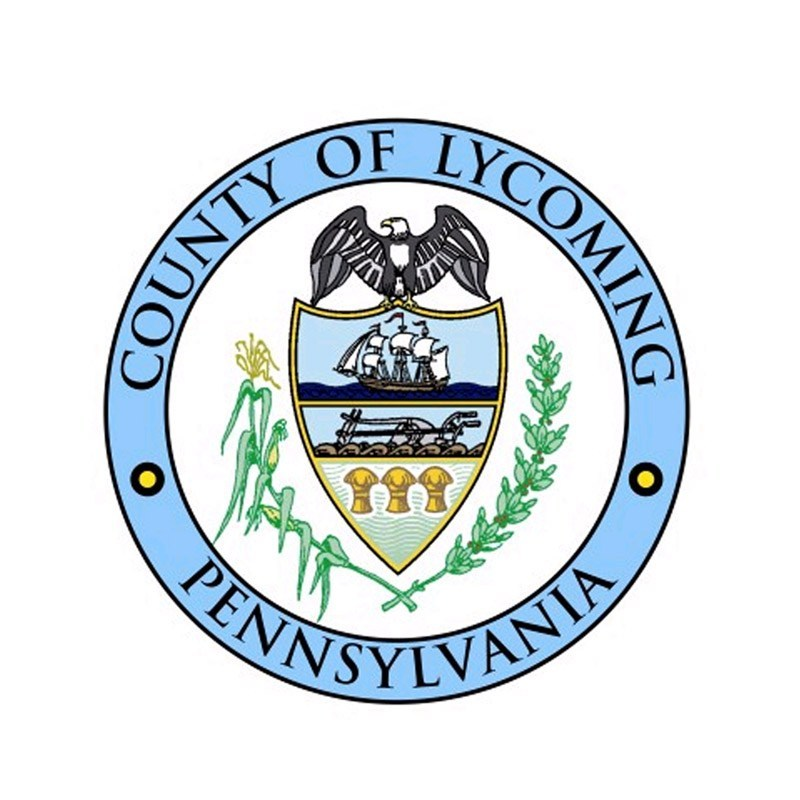
- Flag Seal

- Location within the U.S. state of Pennsylvania
- Coordinates: 41°21′N 77°04′W
- Country: United States
- State: Pennsylvania
- Founded: April 13, 1795
- Named for: Lycoming Creek
- Seat: Williamsport
- Largest city: Williamsport

Area
  - Total: 1,244 sq mi (3,220 km^{2})
  - Land: 1,229 sq mi (3,180 km^{2})
  - Water: 15 sq mi (39 km^{2}) 1.2%

Population (2020)
  - Total: 114,188
  - Estimate (2025): 112,587 ▼
  - Density: 92/sq mi (36/km^{2})
- Time zone: UTC−5 (Eastern)
  - Summer (DST): UTC−4 (EDT)
- Congressional districts: 9th, 15th
- Website: lycomingcountypa.gov

Lycoming County is a county in the Commonwealth of Pennsylvania. As of the 2020 census, the population was 114,188. Its county seat is Williamsport. The county is part of the North Central region of the commonwealth. (Note: Includes Centre, Lycoming, Northumberland, Columbia, Mifflin, Union, Snyder, Clinton, Juniata and Montour Counties)

Lycoming County comprises the Williamsport metropolitan statistical area.

About 130 miles (210 km) northwest of Philadelphia and 165 miles (270 km) east-northeast of Pittsburgh, Lycoming is Pennsylvania's largest county by land area.

== History ==
=== Formation of the county ===
Lycoming County was formed from Northumberland County on April 13, 1795. The county was larger than it is today. It took up most of the land that is now north central Pennsylvania. The following counties have been formed from land that was once part of Lycoming County: Armstrong, Bradford, Centre, Clearfield, Clinton, Indiana, Jefferson, McKean, Potter, Sullivan, Tioga, Venango, Warren, Forest, Elk and Cameron.

Lycoming County was originally named Jefferson County in honor of Thomas Jefferson. This name proved to be unsatisfactory. The name change went through several steps. First a change to Lycoming County was rejected, next the name Susquehanna County was struck down as was Muncy County, before the legislature revisited and settled on Lycoming County for Lycoming Creek, the stream that was the center of the pre-Revolutionary border dispute.

=== County "firsts" ===
1615: The first European in Lycoming County was Étienne Brûlé. He was a voyageur for New France. Brule descended the West Branch Susquehanna River and was held captive by a local Indian tribe near what is now Muncy before escaping and returning to Canada.

1761: The first permanent homes were built in Muncy. Three log cabins were built by Bowyer Brooks, Robert Roberts and James Alexander.

1772: The first gristmill is built on Muncy Creek by John Alward.

1775: The first public road is built along the West Branch Susquehanna River. The road followed the Great Shamokin Path from Fort Augusta in what is now Sunbury to Bald Eagle Creek near modern-day Lock Haven.

1786: The first church built in the county was Lycoming Presbyterian church in what was known as Jaysburg and is now the Newberry section of Williamsport.

1792: The first sawmill was built on Lycoming Creek by Roland Hall.

1795: The first elections for Lycoming County government are held soon after the county was formed from Northumberland County. The elected officers were Samuel Stewart, county sheriff and the first county commissioners were John Hanna, Thomas Forster and James Crawford. Andrew Gregg was elected to represent Lycoming County in the United States Congress, William Hepburn was voted to the Pennsylvania State Senate and Flavel Roan, Hugh White and Robert Martin served as representatives in the Pennsylvania General Assembly.

1823: The county government funded the construction of the first bridges over Loyalsock and Lycoming Creeks.

1839: The first railroad is built. It connected Williamsport with Ralston in northern Lycoming County. The railroad followed Lycoming Creek.

== Geography ==
According to the U.S. Census Bureau, the county has a total area of 1,244 square miles (3,220 km^{2}), of which 1,229 square miles (3,180 km^{2}) is land and 15 square miles (39 km^{2}) (1.2%) is water. Lycoming County is the largest county in Pennsylvania by land area and second-largest by total area; it is larger than the state of Rhode Island. The county has a humid continental climate which is warm-summer (Dfb) except in lower areas near the river which are hot-summer (Dfa). Average monthly temperatures in downtown Williamsport average from 26.5 °F in January to 72.4 °F in July, while in Trout Run they average from 25.5 °F in January to 71.2 °F in July.

=== Appalachian Mountains and Allegheny Plateau ===
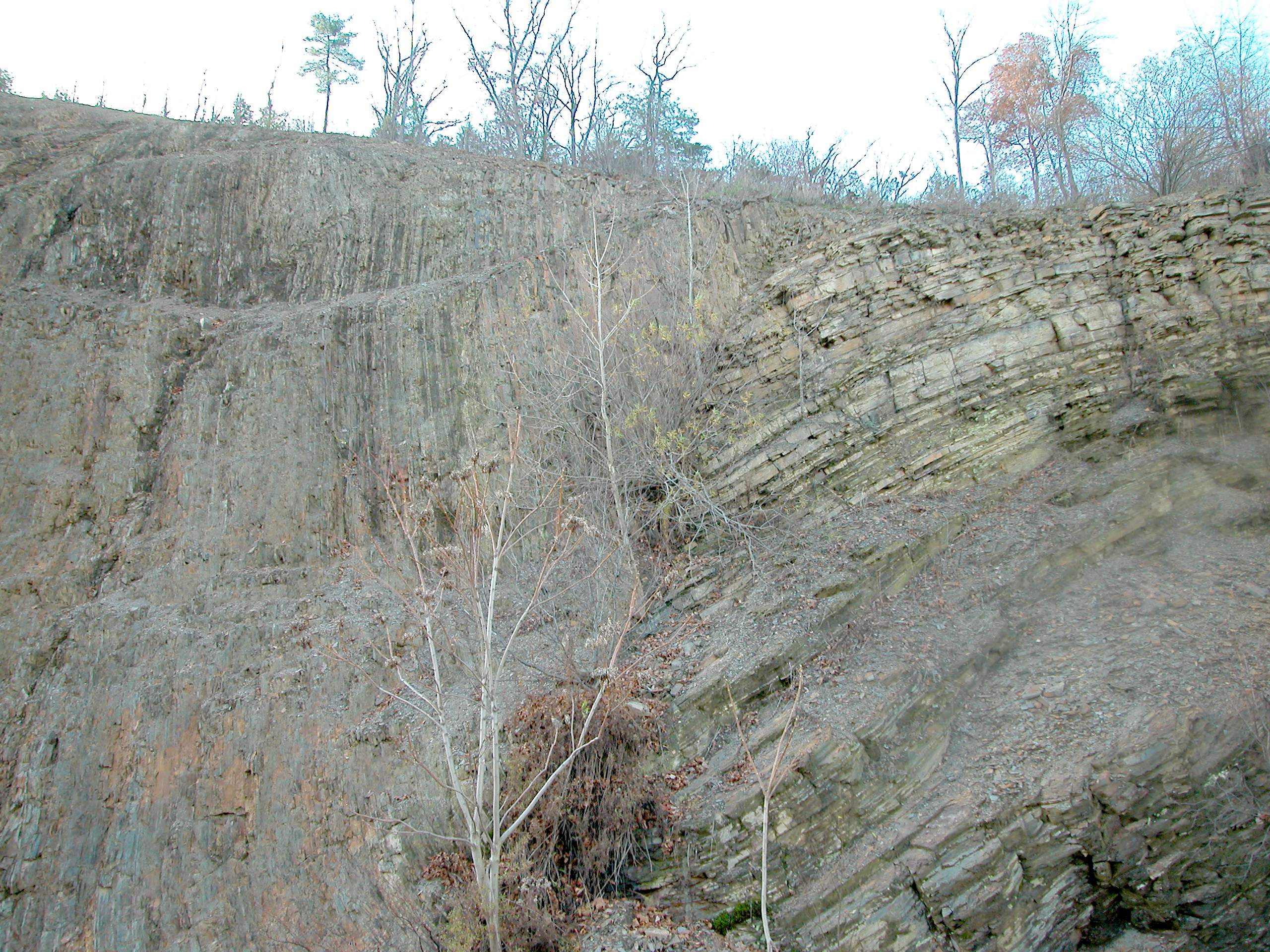
Major fault at the dividing line between the Allegheny Plateau and the true Appalachian Mountains near Williamsport, Pennsylvania

Lycoming County is divided between the Appalachian Mountains in the south, the dissected Allegheny Plateau (which also appears mountainous) in the north and east, and the valley of the West Branch Susquehanna River between these.

=== West Branch Susquehanna River ===
The West Branch of the Susquehanna enters Lycoming County from Clinton County just west of the borough of Jersey Shore, which is on the northwest bank of the river. The river then flows generally east and a little north with some large curves for 15 miles (24 kilometres) to the city of Williamsport, followed by the borough of Montoursville (both on the north bank) as well as the boroughs of Duboistown and South Williamsport (on the south bank).

The river flows just north of Bald Eagle Mountain (one of the northernmost ridges of the Ridge-and-valley Appalachians) through much of its course in Lycoming County, but it passes the end of the mountain and turns south just before the borough of Muncy (on the east bank). It continues south past the borough of Montgomery and leaves Lycoming County, where it forms the border between Union and Northumberland Counties. From there the West Branch merges with the North Branch Susquehanna River at Northumberland, Pennsylvania, and then flows south to the Chesapeake Bay.

=== Major creeks and watersheds ===
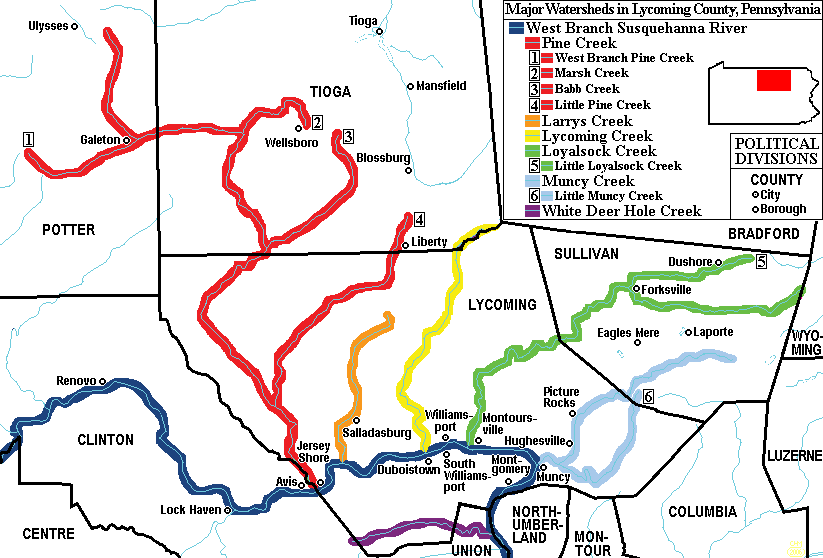
Map of the West Branch Susquehanna River (dark blue) and Major Streams in Lycoming County, Pennsylvania. From west to east (left to right) the watersheds are: Pine Creek (red); Larrys Creek (orange); Lycoming Creek (yellow); Loyalsock Creek (green); Muncy Creek (light blue); and White Deer Hole Creek (purple, south of the river).

The major creeks of Lycoming County are all tributaries of the West Branch Susquehanna River. On the north or left bank of the river they are (from west to east): Pine Creek (and its tributary Little Pine Creek) which the river receives just west of Jersey Shore; Larrys Creek, which the river receives about 7 km (4.3 mi) south of Salladasburg; Lycoming Creek which the river receives in western Williamsport; Loyalsock Creek which the river receives between Williamsport and Montoursville; and Muncy Creek (and its tributary Little Muncy Creek), which the river receives just north of Muncy. Loyalsock and Muncy Creeks are also the major watersheds of Sullivan County.

Finally there is White Deer Hole Creek, the only major creek in Lycoming County on the right bank (i.e. south and west) of the river. It is south of Bald Eagle Mountain, and flows from west to east. The river receives it at the village of Allenwood in Gregg Township in Union County. Other creeks found on the right bank (south and west) of the West Branch Susquehanna River in Lycoming County are relatively minor, including Antes Creek in the Nippenose valley (in Limestone and Nippenose Townships), Mosquito Creek (at Duboistown), Hagermans Run (at South Williamsport), and Black Hole Creek (at Montgomery).

The entire county is in the Chesapeake Bay watershed. The percent of the county drained by each creek's watershed is as follows: Pine Creek, 15.27%; Little Pine Creek, 11.25% (if these two are considered together, 26.52%); Larry's Creek, 7.17%; Lycoming Creek, 17.80%; Loyalsock Creek, 13.23%; Muncy Creek, 4.82%; Little Muncy Creek, 5.86% (if these two are considered together, 10.68%); and White Deer Hole Creek, 4.40%. Minor creeks account for the rest.

=== Adjacent counties ===
Lycoming County is one of the few US counties to border nine counties, a result of its large area.

- Tioga County (north)
- Bradford County (northeast)
- Sullivan County (east)
- Columbia County (southeast)
- Montour County (south)
- Northumberland County (south)
- Union County (southwest)
- Clinton County (west)
- Potter County (northwest)

== Demographics ==
Historical population
Census	Pop.	Note	%±
1800	5,414		—
1810	11,006		103.3%
1820	13,517		22.8%
1830	17,636		30.5%
1840	22,649		28.4%
1850	26,257		15.9%
1860	37,399		42.4%
1870	47,626		27.3%
1880	57,486		20.7%
1890	70,579		22.8%
1900	75,663		7.2%
1910	80,813		6.8%
1920	83,100		2.8%
1930	93,421		12.4%
1940	93,633		0.2%
1950	101,249		8.1%
1960	109,367		8.0%
1970	113,296		3.6%
1980	118,416		4.5%
1990	118,710		0.2%
2000	120,044		1.1%
2010	116,111		−3.3%
2020	114,188		−1.7%
2025 (est.)	112,587	▼	−1.4%
U.S. Decennial Census; 1790–1960 1900–1990; 1990–2000 2010–2019

=== Racial and ethnic composition ===
Lycoming County, Pennsylvania – Racial and ethnic composition Note: the US Census treats Hispanic/Latino as an ethnic category. This table excludes Latinos from the racial categories and assigns them to a separate category. Hispanics/Latinos may be of any race.
Race / Ethnicity (NH = Non-Hispanic)	Pop 1980	Pop 1990	Pop 2000	Pop 2010	Pop 2020	% 1980	% 1990	% 2000	% 2010	% 2020
White alone (NH)	115,736	114,593	112,306	106,710	99,687	97.74%	96.53%	93.55%	91.90%	87.30%
Black or African American alone (NH)	1,739	2,779	5,141	5,060	5,672	1.47%	2.34%	4.28%	4.36%	4.97%
Native American or Alaska Native alone (NH)	91	211	234	191	191	0.08%	0.18%	0.19%	0.16%	0.17%
Asian alone (NH)	321	454	503	663	923	0.27%	0.38%	0.42%	0.57%	0.81%
Native Hawaiian or Pacific Islander alone (NH)	x	x	12	24	27	x	x	0.01%	0.02%	0.02%
Other race alone (NH)	129	32	75	103	383	0.11%	0.03%	0.06%	0.09%	0.34%
Mixed race or Multiracial (NH)	x	x	974	1,801	4,931	x	x	0.81%	1.55%	4.32%
Hispanic or Latino (any race)	400	641	799	1,559	2,374	0.34%	0.54%	0.67%	1.34%	2.08%
Total	118,416	118,710	120,044	116,111	114,188	100.00%	100.00%	100.00%	100.00%	100.00%

=== 2020 census ===
As of the 2020 census, the county had a population of 114,188. The median age was 41.8 years. 20.5% of residents were under the age of 18 and 20.4% of residents were 65 years of age or older. For every 100 females there were 95.6 males, and for every 100 females age 18 and over there were 93.9 males age 18 and over.

The racial and ethnic composition is shown in the table below.

59.6% of residents lived in urban areas, while 40.4% lived in rural areas.

There were 46,603 households in the county, of which 26.4% had children under the age of 18 living in them. Of all households, 46.0% were married-couple households, 19.0% were households with a male householder and no spouse or partner present, and 26.5% were households with a female householder and no spouse or partner present. About 30.1% of all households were made up of individuals and 13.9% had someone living alone who was 65 years of age or older.

There were 52,625 housing units, of which 11.4% were vacant. Among occupied housing units, 67.2% were owner-occupied and 32.8% were renter-occupied. The homeowner vacancy rate was 1.6% and the rental vacancy rate was 8.6%.

=== 2000 census ===
As of the 2000 census, there were 120,044 people, 47,003 households, and 31,680 families residing in the county. The population density was 97 people per square mile (37 people/km^{2}). There were 52,464 housing units at an average density of 42 units per square mile (16/km^{2}). The racial makeup of the county was 93.9% White, 4.3% Black or African American, 0.2% Native American, 0.4% Asian, <0.1% Pacific Islander, 0.3% from other races, and 0.9% from two or more races. 0.7% of the population were Hispanic or Latino of any race. 38.5% were of German, 11.7% American, 9.0% Irish, 7.4% Italian and 7.3% English ancestry.

There were 47,003 households, out of which 29.9% had children under the age of 18 living with them, 53.1% were married couples living together, 10.3% had a female householder with no husband present, and 32.6% were non-families. 26.9% of all households were made up of individuals, and 11.9% had someone living alone who was 65 years of age or older. The average household size was 2.44 and the average family size was 2.95.

In the county, the population was spread out, with 23.3% under the age of 18, 9.7% from 18 to 24, 27.5% from 25 to 44, 23.4% from 45 to 64, and 16.0% who were 65 years of age or older. The median age was 38 years. For every 100 females there were 95.60 males. For every 100 females age 18 and over, there were 92.80 males.

== Law and government ==
For the past century, Lycoming County has been reliably Republican, going Democrat only in the Democratic landslides of 1936 and 1964.

United States presidential election results for Lycoming County, Pennsylvania
Year	Republican		Democratic		Third party(ies)	
Year	No.	%	No.	%	No.	%
1880	4,955	41.41%	6,416	53.61%	596	4.98%
1884	5,355	45.25%	5,900	49.86%	579	4.89%
1888	6,591	45.34%	7,467	51.37%	478	3.29%
1892	5,736	40.30%	7,532	52.92%	966	6.79%
1896	8,097	48.58%	7,340	44.04%	1,231	7.39%
1900	7,750	47.53%	7,427	45.55%	1,127	6.91%
1904	8,928	52.89%	6,424	38.06%	1,527	9.05%
1908	8,708	50.78%	7,144	41.66%	1,298	7.57%
1912	1,631	11.00%	6,039	40.73%	7,157	48.27%
1916	6,010	41.53%	6,640	45.88%	1,823	12.60%
1920	10,570	56.72%	5,853	31.41%	2,212	11.87%
1924	14,039	58.70%	6,857	28.67%	3,020	12.63%
1928	28,720	79.48%	7,132	19.74%	285	0.79%
1932	16,212	55.43%	11,499	39.31%	1,539	5.26%
1936	18,315	47.83%	19,376	50.60%	599	1.56%
1940	21,423	53.62%	18,363	45.96%	167	0.42%
1944	19,886	55.64%	15,658	43.81%	197	0.55%
1948	19,118	57.18%	13,692	40.95%	626	1.87%
1952	25,753	61.60%	15,870	37.96%	184	0.44%
1956	27,030	66.67%	13,490	33.28%	20	0.05%
1960	30,083	62.05%	18,351	37.85%	48	0.10%
1964	19,011	42.30%	25,879	57.58%	55	0.12%
1968	23,830	54.70%	16,888	38.76%	2,848	6.54%
1972	28,913	68.70%	11,999	28.51%	1,175	2.79%
1976	22,648	53.82%	18,635	44.28%	799	1.90%
1980	23,415	57.74%	14,609	36.02%	2,529	6.24%
1984	28,498	68.02%	13,147	31.38%	250	0.60%
1988	24,792	64.00%	13,528	34.92%	415	1.07%
1992	20,536	47.57%	13,315	30.84%	9,321	21.59%
1996	21,535	54.88%	13,516	34.44%	4,190	10.68%
2000	27,137	62.83%	14,663	33.95%	1,393	3.23%
2004	33,961	67.81%	15,681	31.31%	439	0.88%
2008	30,280	61.24%	18,381	37.17%	786	1.59%
2012	30,658	65.69%	15,203	32.58%	808	1.73%
2016	35,627	69.68%	13,020	25.46%	2,484	4.86%
2020	41,462	69.80%	16,971	28.57%	964	1.62%
2024	41,961	70.11%	17,216	28.77%	669	1.12%

United States Senate election results for Lycoming County, Pennsylvania1
Year	Republican		Democratic		Third party(ies)	
Year	No.	%	No.	%	No.	%
1994	19,484	62.61%	10,527	33.83%	1,107	3.56%
2000	28,773	70.75%	11,034	27.13%	861	2.12%
2006	21,734	60.56%	14,155	39.44%	0	0.00%
2012	29,024	62.89%	16,179	35.05%	951	2.06%
2018	33,015	69.35%	13,893	29.18%	699	1.47%
2024	40,672	68.36%	17,354	29.17%	1,472	2.47%

United States Senate election results for Lycoming County, Pennsylvania3
Year	Republican		Democratic		Third party(ies)	
Year	No.	%	No.	%	No.	%
1992	21,986	52.36%	17,285	41.17%	2,718	6.47%
1998	19,506	70.28%	7,134	25.70%	1,114	4.01%
2004	30,071	66.21%	12,796	28.17%	2,553	5.62%
2010	23,944	70.02%	10,251	29.98%	0	0.00%
2016	33,015	65.29%	14,187	28.06%	3,365	6.65%
2022	31,171	67.42%	13,573	29.36%	1,489	3.22%

Pennsylvania Gubernatorial election results for Lycoming County
Year	Republican		Democratic		Third party(ies)	
Year	No.	%	No.	%	No.	%
1970	16,743	48.02%	16,344	46.87%	1,781	5.11%
1974	18,794	57.87%	13,106	40.36%	575	1.77%
1978	19,371	61.61%	11,815	37.58%	254	0.81%
1982	15,578	46.10%	18,009	53.29%	206	0.61%
1986	15,080	52.25%	13,505	46.79%	277	0.96%
1990	8,628	33.33%	17,238	66.59%	19	0.07%
1994	19,334	60.42%	9,134	28.55%	3,530	11.03%
1998	20,511	70.85%	6,058	20.93%	2,382	8.23%
2002	20,751	65.72%	9,937	31.47%	889	2.82%
2006	21,116	58.83%	14,777	41.17%	0	0.00%
2010	25,154	73.05%	9,278	26.95%	0	0.00%
2014	20,106	64.64%	10,997	35.36%	0	0.00%
2018	25,570	62.33%	14,727	35.90%	728	1.77%
2022	29,755	64.29%	15,643	33.80%	887	1.92%

=== County commissioners ===
- Scott L. Metzger (R)
- Marc C. Sortman (R)
- Mark A. Mussina (D)

=== Law enforcement agencies ===
- Pennsylvania State Police
- Williamsport Police Department
- Lycoming County Sheriff's Office
- South Williamsport Police Department (and DuBoistown borough)
- Lycoming Regional Police Department (Cummings, McHenry, Porter, Piatt, Nippenose, Old Lycoming, Hepburn, Lycoming Townships and Jersey Shore borough)
- Montoursville Police Department
- Muncy Police Department (and Brady Township)
- Muncy Township Police Department
- Hughesville Police Department (and Picture Rocks Borough)
- Pennsylvania College of Technology Police Department
- Lycoming County Probation and Parole Department

=== Fire departments ===
- Williamsport Bureau of Fire - Station 1
- Woodward Township VFC - Station 2
- Independent Hose of Jersey Shore - Station 3
- South Williamsport VFC - Station 5
- Nippenose Valley VFC - Station 6
- Nisbet VFC - Station 7
- DuBoistown VFC Station - 8
- Clinton Township VFC - Station 12
- Montgomery VFC - Station 13
- Old Lycoming Township VFC - Station 14
- Hepburn Township VFC - Station 15
- Trout Run VFC - Station 16
- Ralston VFC - Station 17
- Loyalsock VFC - Station 18
- Williamsport Regional Airport - Station 19
- Montoursville Fire Department - Station 20
- Washington Township VFC - Station 21
- Eldred TWP VFC - Station 22
- Muncy Township VFC - Station 23
- Hughesville VFC - Station 24
- Pluntetts Creek VFC - Station 25
- Picture Rocks VFC - Station 26
- Lairdsville VFC - Station 27
- Waterville VFC - Station 28
- Antes Fort VFC - Station 31
- Brown Township VFC - Station 35
- Black Forest VFC - Station 36
- Muncy Area VFC - Station 39
- Citizens Hose of Jersey Shore - Station 45

=== Pennsylvania House of Representatives ===
- Jamie Flick, Republican, Pennsylvania's 83rd Representative District
- Joseph D. Hamm, Republican, Pennsylvania's 84th Representative District

=== Pennsylvania State Senate ===
- Gene Yaw, Republican, Pennsylvania's 23rd Senatorial District

=== United States House of Representatives ===
- Dan Meuser, Republican, Pennsylvania's 9th congressional district
- Glenn Thompson, Republican, Pennsylvania's 15th congressional district

=== United States Senate ===
- John Fetterman, Democrat
- Dave McCormick, Republican

== Education ==
=== Colleges ===
- Lycoming College
- Pennsylvania College of Technology

=== Public school districts ===
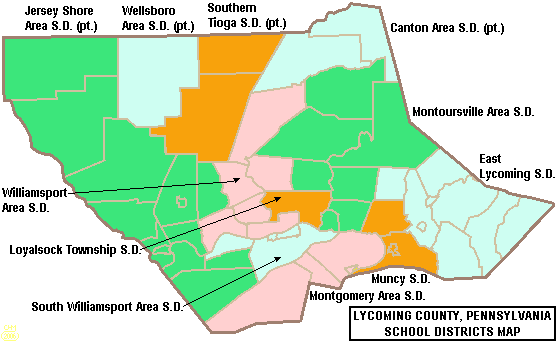
Map of Lycoming County, Pennsylvania Public School Districts

School districts include:

- Canton Area School District (also in Bradford and Tioga Counties) Canton Warriors
- East Lycoming School District Hughesville Spartans
- Jersey Shore Area School District (also in Clinton County) Jersey Shore Bulldogs
- Loyalsock Township School District Loyalsock Lancers
- Montgomery Area School District Montgomery Red Raiders
- Montoursville Area School District Montoursville Warriors
- Muncy School District Muncy Indians
- South Williamsport Area School District South Williamsport Mountaineers
- Southern Tioga School District (also in Tioga County) Liberty Mountaineers, Mansfield Tigers, and North Penn Panthers
- Wellsboro Area School District (also in Tioga County) Wellsboro Hornets
- Williamsport Area School District Williamsport Millionaires

=== Other public entities ===
- Lycoming Career and Technology Center - Hughesville
- BLAST Intermediate Unit #17

=== Non public entities ===
- Bald Eagle School - Montgomery
- Brookside School - Montgomery
- Countryside School - Jersey Shore
- Fairfield Academy - Montoursville
- LCCCs Children's Development Center - Williamsport
- Mountain View Christian School - South Williamsport
- Mountain View School - Williamsport
- Pine Woods Nippenose Valley - Jersey Shore
- Scenic Mountain Parochial School - Allenwood
- St John Neumann Regional Academy - Williamsport (accepting OSTC students)
- St John Neumann Regional Academy at Faxon - Williamsport
- St John Neumann Regional Academy High School Campus - Williamsport (accepting OSTC students)
- Valley Bell School - Montgomery
- West Branch School - Williamsport
- White Deer Valley School - Montgomery
- Williamsport Christian School - Williamsport

Data from EdNA database maintained by Pennsylvania Department of Education, July 2012

=== Libraries ===
There are six public libraries in Lycoming County:

- James V. Brown Library (Williamsport)
- Hughesville Area Public Library
- Jersey Shore Public Library
- Dr. W.B. Konkle Memorial Library (Montoursville)
- Montgomery Area Public Library
- Muncy Public Library

There are also four Link libraries in the county.

== Transportation ==
=== Primary highways ===
- I-99
- I-180
- US 15
- US 220
- PA 14
- PA 42
- PA 44
- PA 54
- PA 87
- PA 118
- PA 184
- PA 239
- PA 284
- PA 287
- PA 405
- PA 414
- PA 442
- PA 554
- PA 654
- PA 664
- PA 864
- PA 880
- PA 973

=== Airports ===
There are only two public use airports in the county. The Williamsport Regional Airport has commercial flights to Washington D.C., and a FBO for private jets and charters. There is also the Jersey Shore Airport, which only has a grass runway and can only handle light aircraft.

== Recreation ==
There are three Pennsylvania state parks in Lycoming County:

- Little Pine State Park
- Susquehanna State Park
- Upper Pine Bottom State Park

There are parts of two Pennsylvania state forests in Lycoming County:

- Tiadaghton State Forest in the southern and western parts of the county,
- Loyalsock State Forest in the eastern part of the county.

== Communities ==
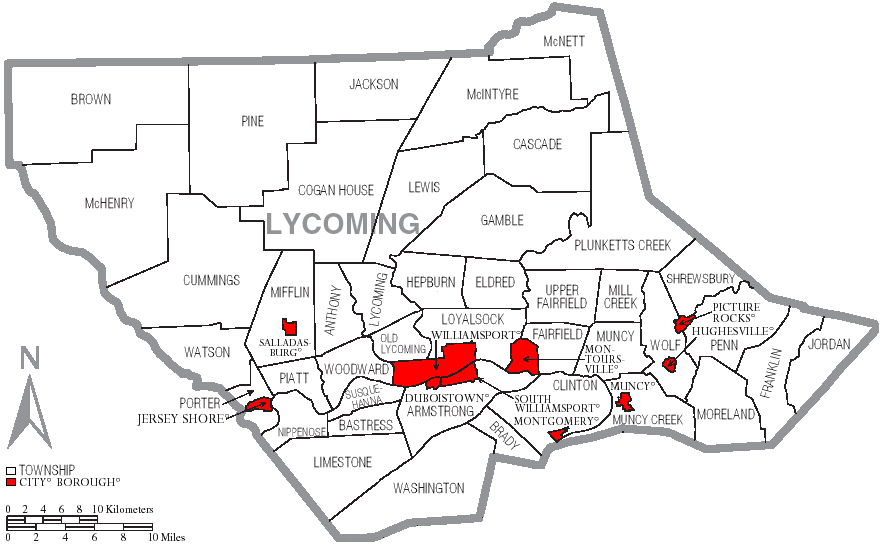
Map of Lycoming County, Pennsylvania with Municipal Labels showing Cities and Boroughs (red), Townships (white), and Census-designated places (blue).

Under Pennsylvania law, there are four types of incorporated municipalities: cities, boroughs, townships, and, in at most two cases, towns. The following cities, boroughs and townships are located in Lycoming County:

=== City ===
- Williamsport (county seat)

=== Boroughs ===
- Duboistown
- Hughesville
- Jersey Shore
- Montgomery
- Montoursville
- Muncy
- Picture Rocks
- Salladasburg
- South Williamsport

=== Townships ===
- Anthony
- Armstrong
- Bastress
- Brady
- Brown
- Cascade
- Clinton
- Cogan House
- Cummings
- Eldred
- Fairfield
- Franklin
- Gamble
- Hepburn
- Jackson
- Jordan
- Lewis
- Limestone
- Loyalsock
- Lycoming
- McHenry
- McIntyre
- McNett
- Mifflin
- Mill Creek
- Moreland
- Muncy
- Muncy Creek
- Nippenose
- Old Lycoming
- Penn
- Piatt
- Pine
- Plunketts Creek
- Porter
- Shrewsbury
- Susquehanna
- Upper Fairfield
- Washington
- Watson
- Wolf
- Woodward

=== Census-designated places ===
Census-designated places are geographical areas designated by the U.S. Census Bureau for the purposes of compiling demographic data. They are not actual jurisdictions under Pennsylvania law. Other unincorporated communities, such as villages, may be listed here as well.

- Faxon
- Garden View
- Kenmar
- Oval
- Rauchtown (mostly in Clinton County)

=== Unincorporated communities ===
- Antes Fort
- Balls Mills
- Barbours
- Cammal
- Cedar Run
- Chemung
- Hoppestown
- Huntersville
- Jersey Mills
- Lairdsville
- Leolyn
- Linden
- Nisbet
- Pennsdale
- Proctor
- Ralston
- Roaring Branch
- Slate Run
- Unityville

=== Population ranking ===
The population ranking of the following table is based on the 2010 census of Lycoming County.

† county seat

Rank	City/Town/etc.	Municipal type	Population (2010 Census)
1	† Williamsport	City	29,381
2	South Williamsport	Borough	6,379
3	Montoursville	Borough	4,615
4	Jersey Shore	Borough	4,361
5	Kenmar	CDP	4,124
6	Garden View	CDP	2,503
7	Muncy	Borough	2,477
8	Hughesville	Borough	2,128
9	Montgomery	Borough	1,579
10	Faxon	CDP	1,395
11	Duboistown	Borough	1,205
12	Rauchtown (mostly in Clinton County)	CDP	726
13	Picture Rocks	Borough	678
14	Oval	CDP	361
15	Salladasburg	Borough	238

== See also ==
- Frank E. Heller Dam
- List of people from Lycoming County, Pennsylvania
- National Register of Historic Places listings in Lycoming County, Pennsylvania
