= Pennsylvania Route 184 =

State highway in Lycoming County, Pennsylvania, US

Pennsylvania Route 184

Route information
- Maintained by PennDOT
- Length: 9.684 mi (15.585 km)
- Existed: 1928–present

Major junctions
- West end: PA 287 in Brookside
- I-99 / US 15 in Cogan House Township
- East end: Steam Mill Road in Cogan House Township

Location
- Country: United States
- State: Pennsylvania
- Counties: Lycoming

Highway system
- Pennsylvania State Route System; Interstate; US; State; Scenic; Legislative
← PA 183	→ PA 185

Pennsylvania Route 184 (PA 184, designated by the Pennsylvania Department of Transportation as SR 184) is an 9.68-mile-long (15.58 km) state highway located in Lycoming County in Pennsylvania. The western terminus is at PA 287 in Brookside. The eastern terminus is at Steam Mill Road, just after an interchange with Interstate 99 (I-99) in Steam Valley, a hamlet in Cogan House Township. The route was first designated as a spur from PA 84 in Brookside to US 15 via Cogan House Road. (PA 84 was renumbered to PA 287 in 1961.) Construction to upgrade US 15 several miles each way from its intersection with PA 184 to interstate standards included a new interchange with PA 184.

== Route description ==
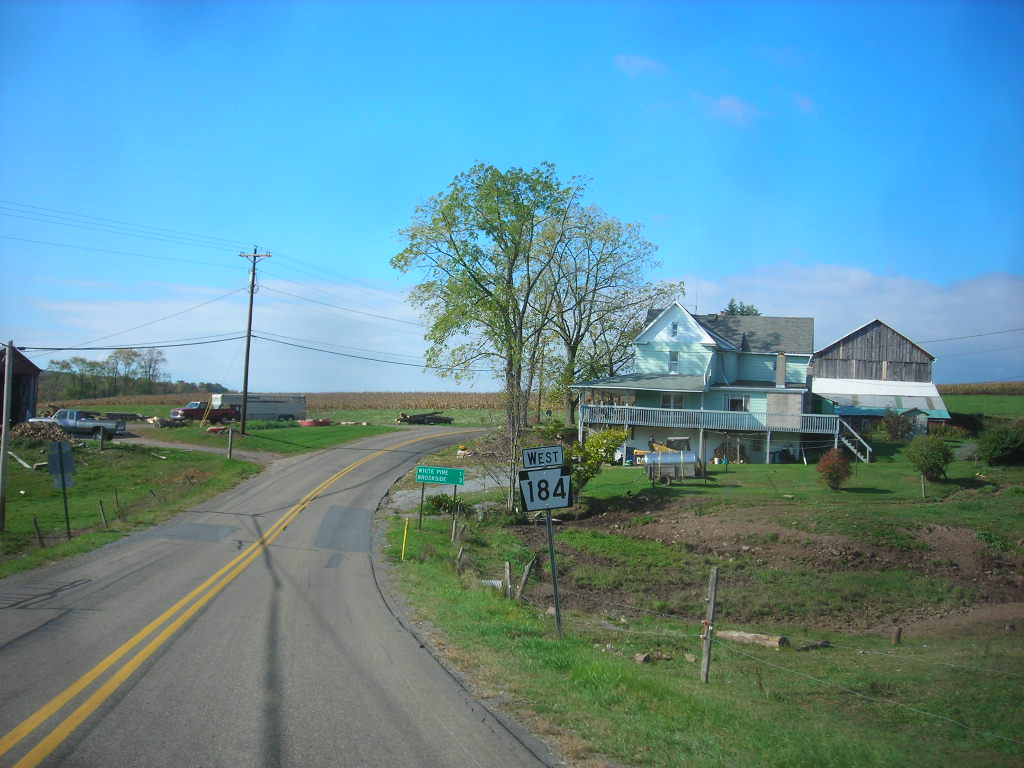
PA 184 heading westbound through Beech Grove

PA 184 begins at an intersection with PA 287 in the hamlet of Brookside. The route progresses to the northeast as a two-lane undivided road, heading through the rural areas of Cogan House Township. PA 184 continuously winds through the woods before forming a short eastward pattern after the intersection with Corgi Cabin Lane. The highway clears of the woods and enters fields. There, the route turns to the northeast at an intersection with Harman Road, a dead-end street to a local farm. PA 184 passes a large patch of woods to the east and enters the hamlet of White Pine. In White Pine, the highway passes some residences and intersects with Lick Run Road, where the route makes an abrupt turn to the east through farms.

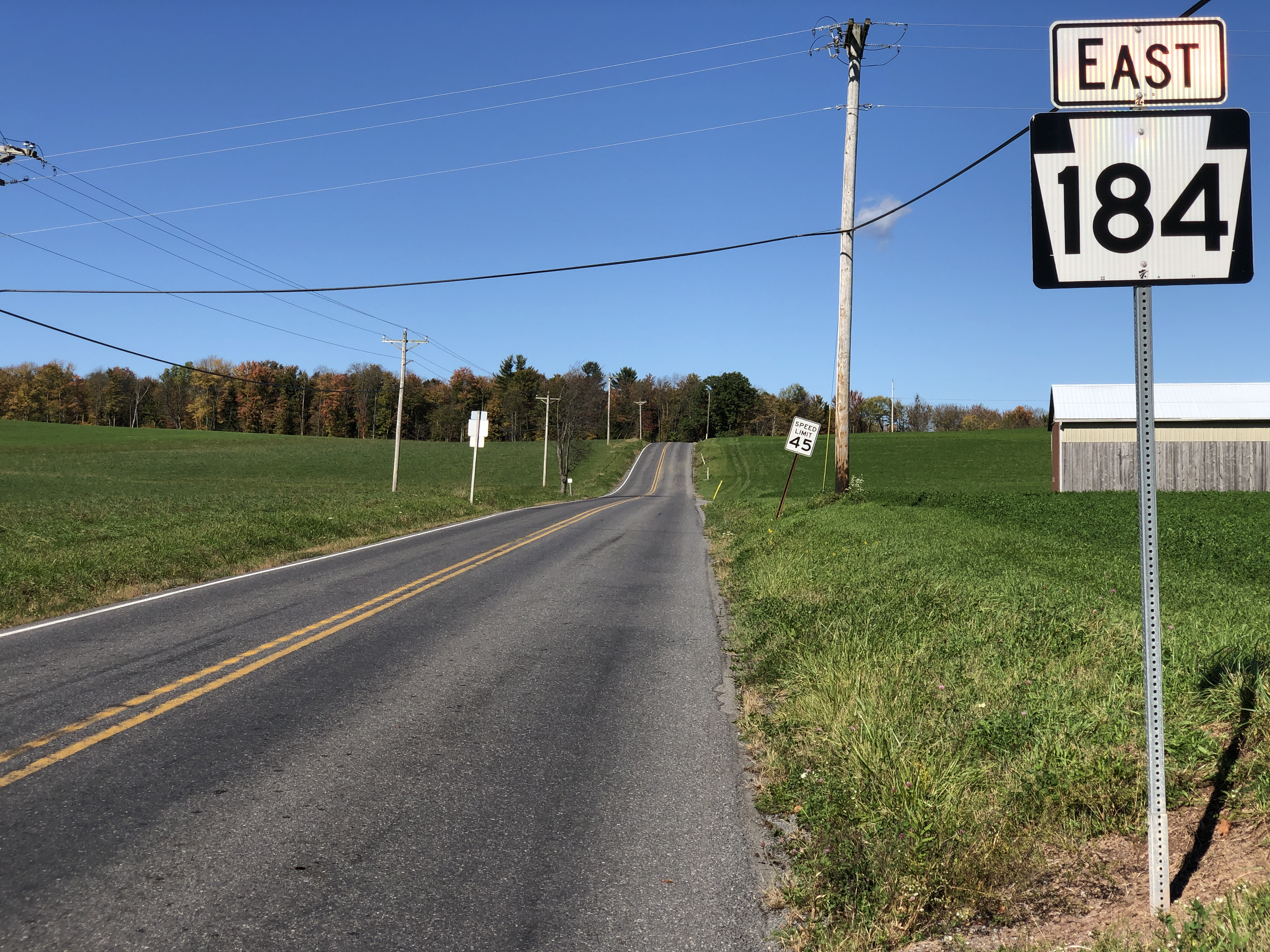
PA 184 eastbound in Cogan House Township

At the intersection with Campbell Road, PA 184 turns to the north along the right-of-way of Campbell Road, while the original eastward route continues as Cogan House Road. Farms continue as the scenery for a couple miles as the highway heads north into the hamlet of Beech Grove. In Beech Grove, PA 184 makes several curves before heading eastward until the intersection with Taylor Road, where the highway turns to the northeast and enters the hamlet of Steam Valley. Through Steam Valley, PA 184 returns to the woods and starts passing numerous residences before entering the interchange with I-99/US 15. Midway through the interchange, the road reaches the northbound on-off ramps, where PA 184 continues north past a parking lot and terminates at Steam Mill Road.

== History ==
The interchange of PA 184 and US 15 in Steam Valley

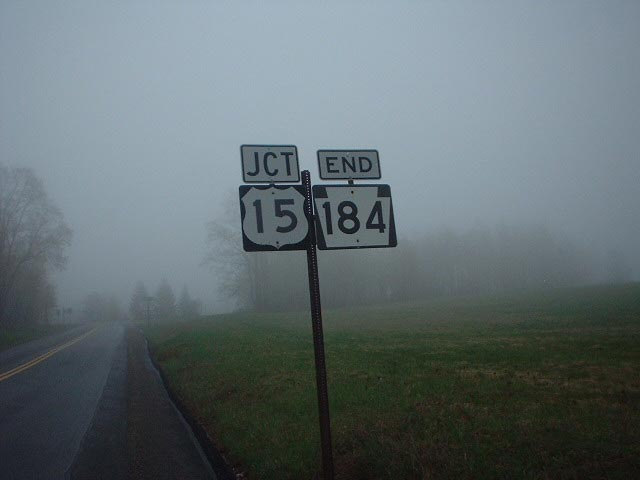
The original intersection between PA 184 and US 15 as seen in 2007.

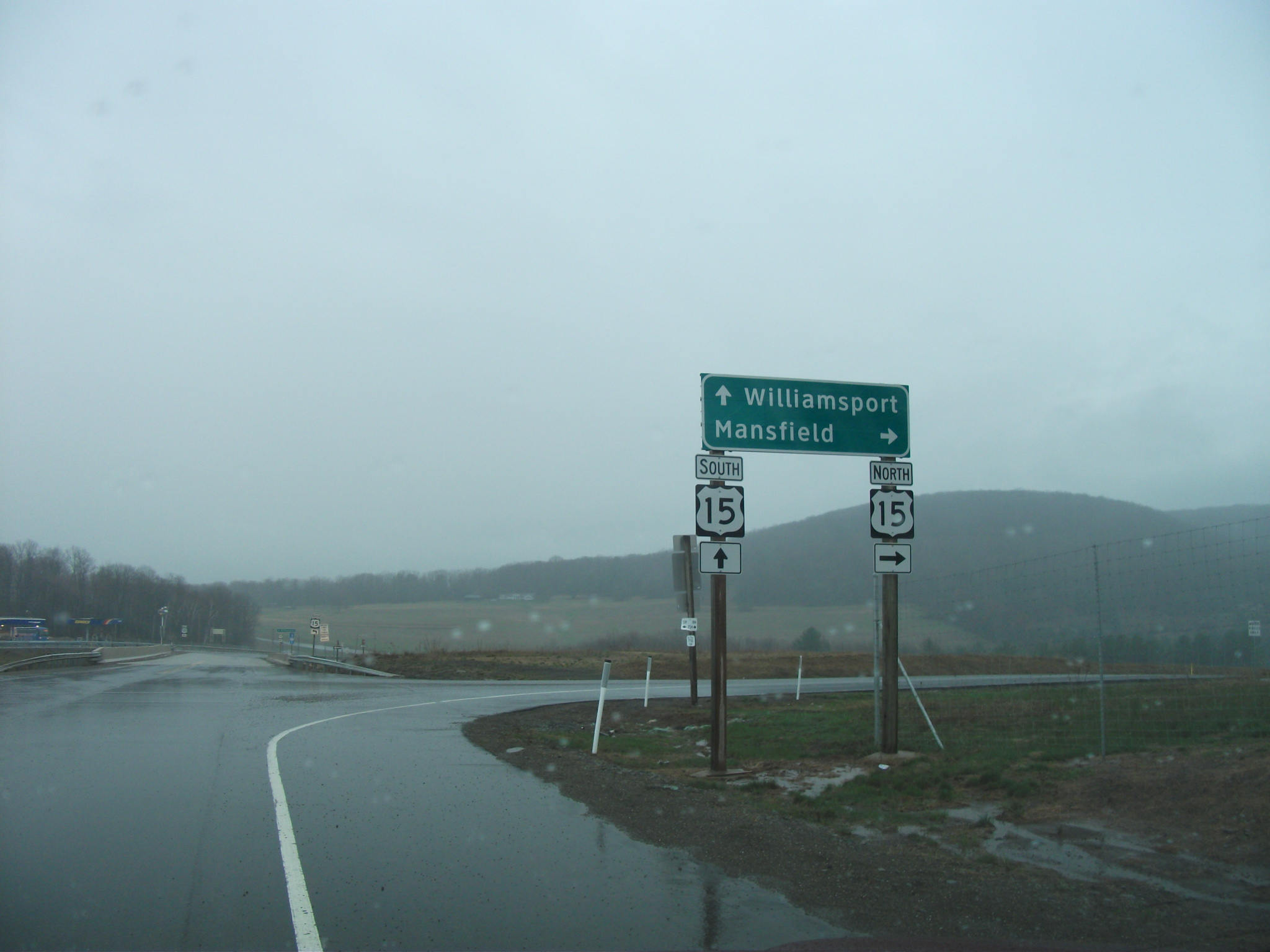
The completed interchange facing the interchange from PA 184 in 2011.

PA 184 was first designated in 1928 on a different alignment between the intersection with its parent route, PA 84 in Brookside to Campbell Road. The route followed the current-day alignment of Cogan House Road. Four years later, PA 184 was paved from Brookside to Campbell Road and from the intersection with Edwards Road to US 15 in Steam Valley. In 1989, the route was realigned onto its current alignment through Beech Grove with that was repaved by the Pennsylvania Department of Transportation.

In the winter of 2007, the Department of Transportation announced the construction of the new interchange between US 15 and PA 184, as part of the construction to upgrade US 15 into an interstate highway. The total cost for the portion from Trout Run to Buttonwood was to be $71 million (2007 USD). Early plans were to build an interchange south of PA 184, which would mean that southbound travelers would have to backtrack to access local businesses. Per a suggestion by the Fry family, owners of a local restaurant, the design was changed to realign PA 184 to the north and build a full interchange. As a result, a few homes belonging to members of the Fry family would be in the way of the new roadways, and the buildings were moved to nearby family-owned land. The project was completed in the fall of 2009 with a ribbon cutting ceremony on the southbound lanes.

== Major intersections ==
The entire route is in Cogan House Township, Lycoming County.

mi	km	Destinations	Notes
0.000	0.000	PA 287 – Salladasburg, Wellsboro	Western terminus
9.564	15.392	I-99 / US 15 – Williamsport, Mansfield	Exit 155 on I-99
9.684	15.585	Steam Mill Road	Eastern terminus
1.000 mi = 1.609 km; 1.000 km = 0.621 mi
