= Mifflin Township, Lycoming County, Pennsylvania =

Township in Pennsylvania, US

Mifflin Township
- Township
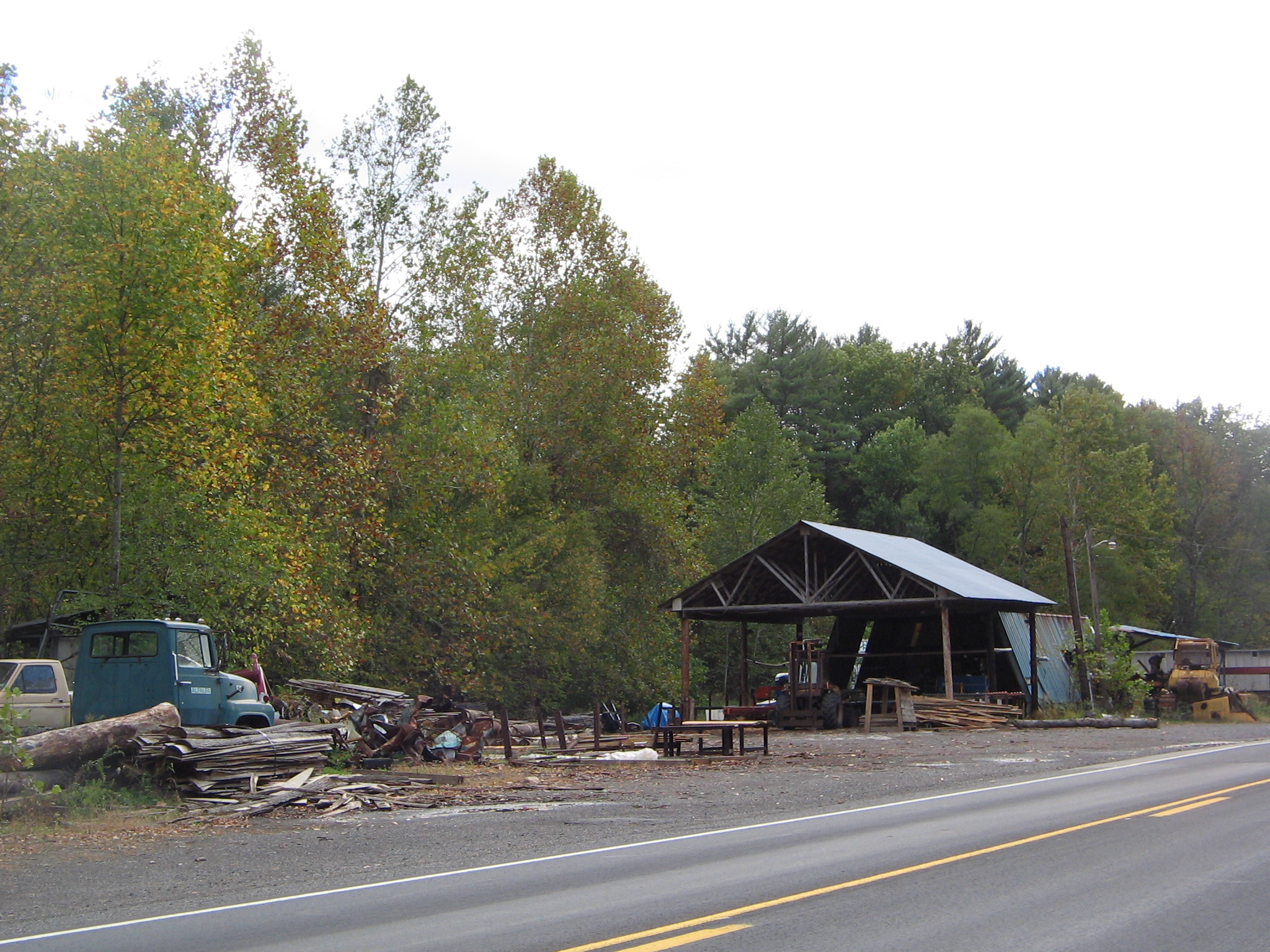
- A township sawmill

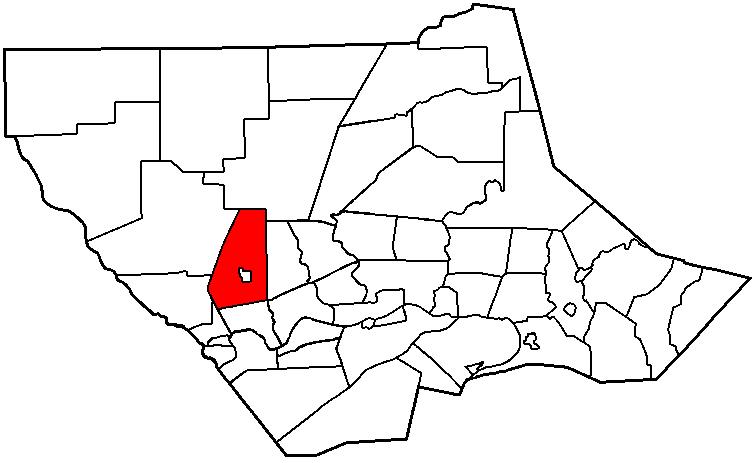
- Map of Lycoming County, Pennsylvania highlighting Mifflin Township

- Map of Lycoming County, Pennsylvania
- Coordinates: 41°16′17″N 77°14′14″W
- Country: United States
- State: Pennsylvania
- County: Lycoming
- Settled: 1790
- Incorporated: 1803

Area
  - Total: 27.81 sq mi (72.04 km^{2})
  - Land: 27.71 sq mi (71.78 km^{2})
  - Water: 0.10 sq mi (0.26 km^{2})
- Elevation: 1,180 ft (360 m)

Population (2020)
  - Total: 1,088 ▲
  - Estimate (2021): 1,084
  - Density: 37.8/sq mi (14.59/km^{2})
- Time zone: UTC-5 (Eastern (EST))
  - Summer (DST): UTC-4 (EDT)
- FIPS code: 42-081-49280
- GNIS feature ID: 1216760
- Website: www.mifflintwp.com

Mifflin Township is a township in Lycoming County, Pennsylvania, United States. The population was 1,088 at the 2020 census. It is part of the Williamsport Metropolitan Statistical Area.

== History ==
Mifflin Township was formed in 1803 by dividing Lycoming Township. It is named in honor of Thomas Mifflin, the first governor of Pennsylvania.

=== Early settlers ===
When colonial settlers first arrived in what is now Mifflin Township, they were outside the western boundary of what was then the Province of Pennsylvania. These settlers were not under the jurisdiction or protection of any type from any of the Thirteen Colonies. They became known as the Fair Play Men. These men established their own form of government, known as the "Fair Play System", with three elected commissioners who ruled on land claims and other issues for the group. In a remarkable coincidence, the Fair Play Men made their own Declaration of Independence from Britain on July 4, 1776, beneath the "Tiadaghton Elm" on the banks of Pine Creek.

Mifflin Township is located within the Larrys Creek watershed. This area was densely covered with trees and brush until about 1790, when the first settlers attempted to clear some of the land that surrounds Larrys Creek. John Murphy was the first settler to establish a permanent homestead. He cleared some land along the creek and built a home. His daughter, Sarah, is thought to have been the first white child to have been born in Mifflin Township. Murphy was soon followed by other settlers who also built cabins, cleared some land for farming and built sawmills. Lumber was soon to become the dominant industry in Mifflin Township.

=== Lumber industry ===
As timber and lumber became a major industry in the mid-19th century, Larrys Creek was a source of power for sawmills and other mills. The first sawmill on the creek was built in 1799. The relatively low flow of water in the creek did not allow rafts of logs to be floated downstream to the river and the lumber boom at Williamsport.

This and the lack of logging railroads along the creek led to the development of many small sawmills. Twelve sawmills were on the Second Fork, six on the First Fork, one each on Canoe Run, and the rest were on Larrys Creek itself. By 1903 just two mills were still standing and only one of those was operating.

Lumbering removed the tree trunks, but left many flammable limbs, branches, and stumps behind. On May 2, 1872, a large forest fire destroyed the villages of Carter and Gould, 6 miles (10 km) north of Salladasburg on Larrys Creek in Mifflin Township. Presently there are large tracts of second-growth forest, and small lumber companies still operate in the township.

== Geography ==
Mifflin Township is in western Lycoming County and is bordered by Cogan House Township to the north, Anthony Township to the east, Woodward Township at one point to the southeast, Piatt Township to the south, Porter Township to the southwest, and Watson and Cummings townships to the west. Mifflin Township surrounds the borough of Salladasburg, a separate municipality.

Pennsylvania Route 287 passes through the township and Salladasburg, leading north 23 miles (37 km) to Hoytville and south 4 miles (6 km) to U.S. Route 220 at the West Branch Susquehanna River. Pennsylvania Route 973 crosses PA-287 in Salladasburg and leads east 11 miles (18 km) to Hepburnville and southwest 6 miles (10 km) to Pennsylvania Route 44 in the valley of Pine Creek. Williamsport, the Lycoming county seat, is 16 miles (26 km) to the southeast via Routes 287 and 220.

According to the United States Census Bureau, Mifflin Township has a total area of 27.8 square miles (72.0 km^{2}), of which 27.7 square miles (71.8 km^{2}) are land 0.1 square miles (0.3 km^{2}), or 0.36%, are water. Larrys Creek is the main waterway through the township, flowing southward to the West Branch Susquehanna River in Piatt Township.

== Demographics ==
Historical population
Census	Pop.	Note	%±
2010	1,070		—
2020	1,088		1.7%
2021 (est.)	1,084		−0.4%
U.S. Decennial Census

As of the census of 2000, there were 1,145 people, 438 households, and 335 families residing in the township. The population density was 41.1 inhabitants per square mile (15.9/km^{2}). There were 470 housing units at an average density of 16.9/sq mi (6.5/km^{2}). The racial makeup of the township was 98.78% White, 0.17% African American, 0.26% Native American, 0.17% Asian, and 0.61% from two or more races.

There were 438 households, out of which 34.7% had children under the age of 18 living with them, 63.9% were married couples living together, 8.4% had a female householder with no husband present, and 23.3% were non-families. 18.3% of all households were made up of individuals, and 7.3% had someone living alone who was 65 years of age or older. The average household size was 2.61 and the average family size was 2.95.

In the township the population was spread out, with 25.2% under the age of 18, 5.9% from 18 to 24, 30.7% from 25 to 44, 27.4% from 45 to 64, and 10.8% who were 65 years of age or older. The median age was 38 years. For every 100 females there were 100.9 males. For every 100 females age 18 and over, there were 98.8 males.

The median income for a household in the township was $36,205, and the median income for a family was $42,125. Males had a median income of $30,484 versus $21,319 for females. The per capita income for the township was $15,941. About 7.0% of families and 8.8% of the population were below the poverty line, including 7.8% of those under age 18 and 9.7% of those age 65 or over.
