= Pennsylvania Route 973 =

State highway in Lycoming County, Pennsylvania, US

Pennsylvania Route 973

Route information
- Maintained by PennDOT
- Length: 27.3 mi (43.9 km)

Major junctions
- West end: PA 44 in Watson Township
- I-99 / US 15 in Lycoming Township
- East end: PA 87 in Loyalsockville

Location
- Country: United States
- State: Pennsylvania
- Counties: Lycoming

Highway system
- Pennsylvania State Route System; Interstate; US; State; Scenic; Legislative
← PA 972	→ PA 974

Pennsylvania Route 973 (PA 973) is a highway which runs for 27.3 miles (43.9 km), generally east–west in Lycoming County in north central Pennsylvania in the United States. Its western terminus is on the east bank of Pine Creek at PA 44 in the unincorporated village of Tomb (or Tombs Run) in Watson Township, and its eastern terminus is at the hamlet of Loyalsockville in Upper Fairfield Township at PA 87.

== Route description ==
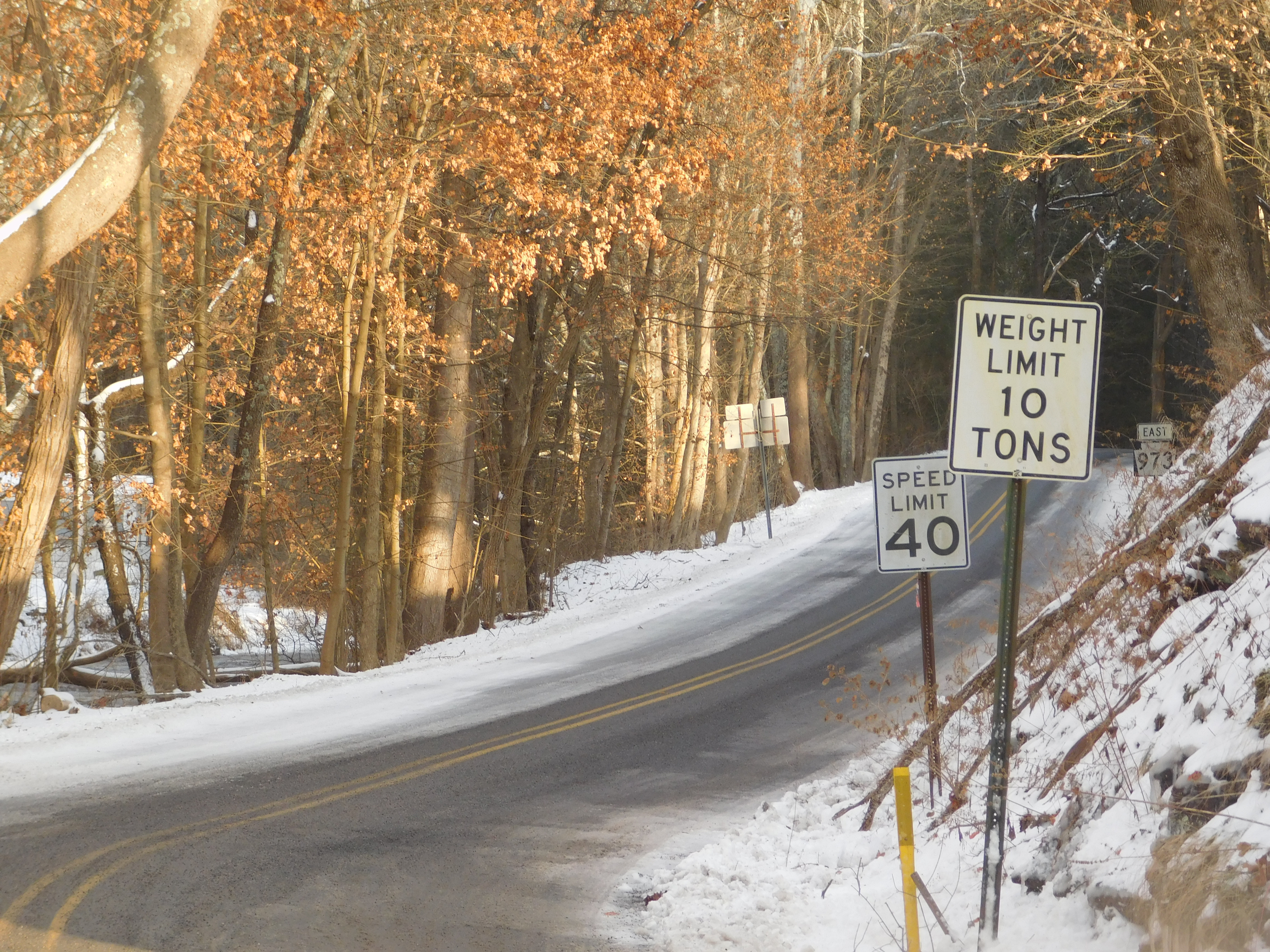
PA 973 from PA 44 in Tomb

Starting at its western end at PA 44 in the village of Tomb in Watson Township, 973 runs east along Tombs Run, then northeast along the North Fork of Tombs Run. It then heads east into Mifflin Township, following Mud Run and the First Fork of Larrys Creek before crossing Larrys Creek and PA 287, and turning north into the borough of Salladasburg. It follows Larrys Creek northeast into Anthony Township, where it leaves Larrys Creek and follows Stoney Gap Run into Lycoming Township.

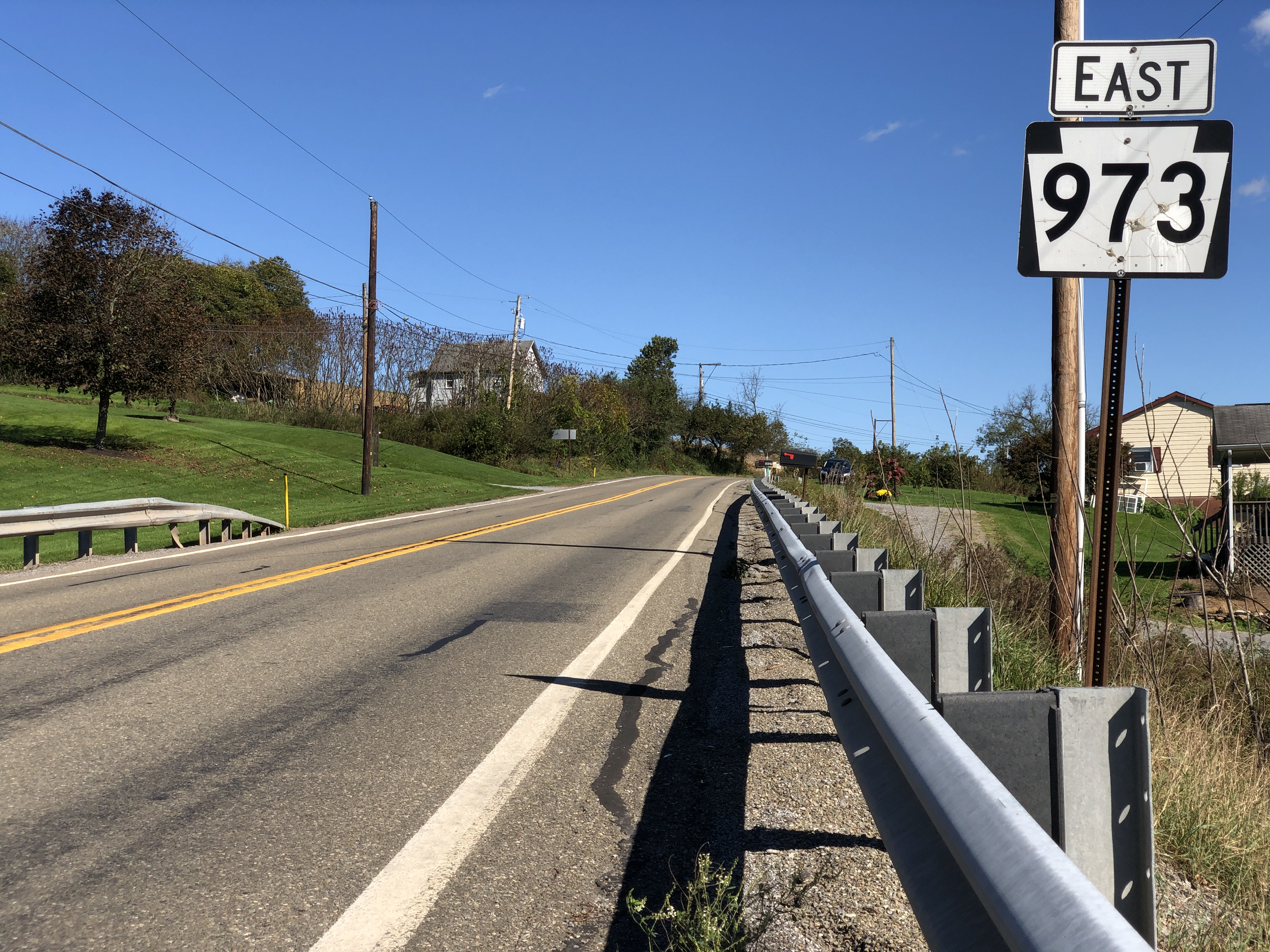
PA 973 eastbound in Hepburn Township

There PA 973 follows Hoaglands Run east through the village of Quiggleville and hamlet of Perryville, passing a single offramp from southbound I-99/US 15 and overpasses carrying I-99/US 15 before crossing Lycoming Creek into Hepburn Township. Following Lycoming Creek southeast, PA 973 passes through the villages of Cogan Station and Hepburnville, then turns northeast to follow Mill Creek to the hamlet of Balls Mills, and on into Eldred Township. There it passes through the village of Warrensville, then the Loyalsock State Game Farm, and crosses Loyalsock Creek just before it meets PA 87 at Loyalsockville and its eastern end.

== History ==
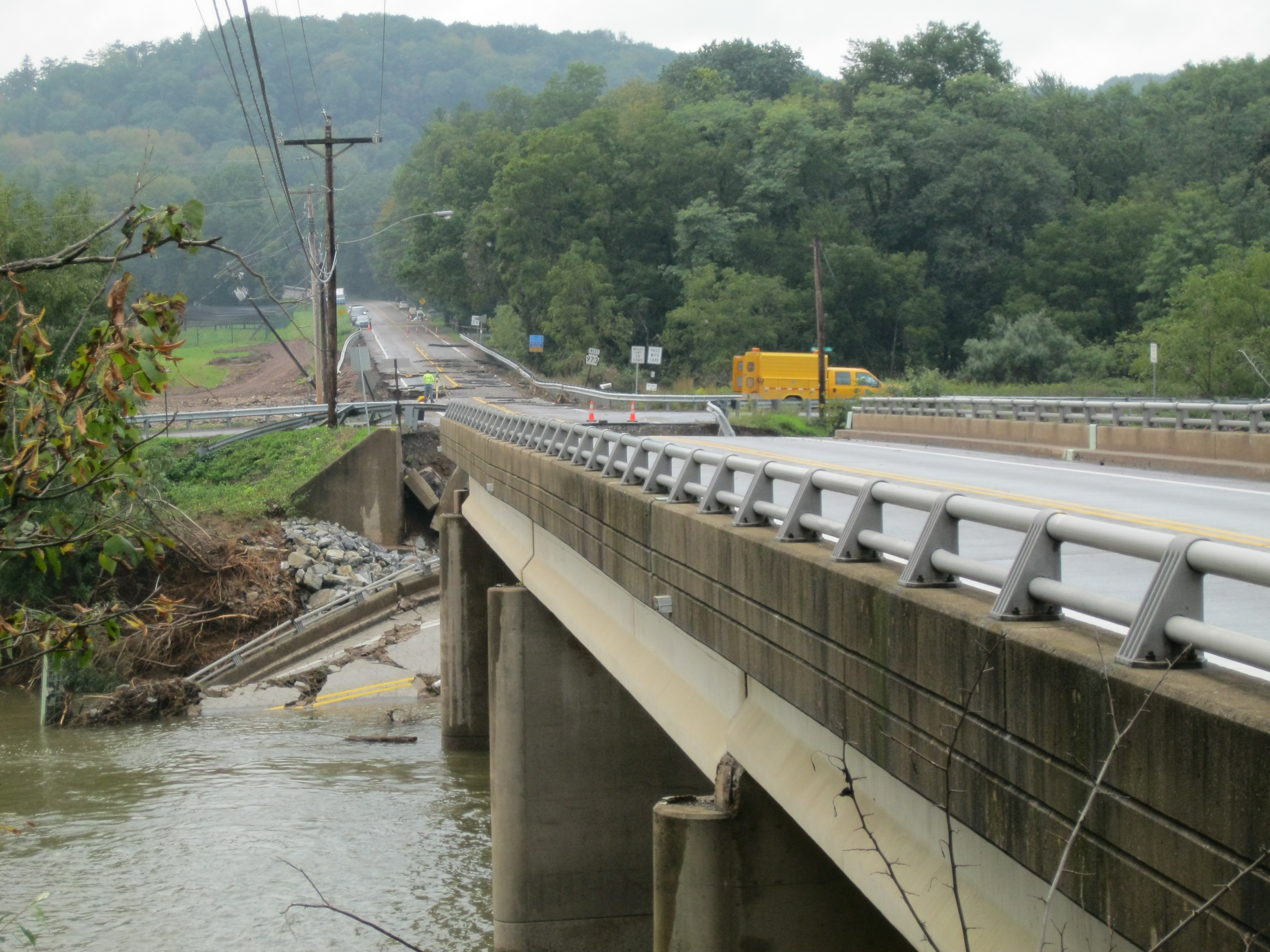
The destroyed PA 973 bridge over Loyalsock Creek, seen from PA 87

On September 8, 2011, the bridge at the eastern end of the highway over Loyalsock Creek (known as the Slabtown Bridge) was destroyed by flooding. Heavy rain from the remnants of Tropical Storm Lee raised the creek "higher than anything we've seen in recorded history", according to a Lycoming County official. The western portion of the bridge collapsed. A replacement bridge was completed in November 2012 at a cost of $3 million.

== Major intersections ==
The entire route is in Lycoming County.

Location	mi	km	Destinations	Notes
Watson Township	0.0	0.0	PA 44 (Coudersport Pike) – Jersey Shore, Waterville	Western terminus
Mifflin Township	6.2	10.0	PA 287 south – Jersey Shore	West end of PA 287 overlap
Mifflin Township	6.3	10.1	PA 287 north – English Center	East end of PA 287 overlap
Lycoming Township	15.8	25.4	I-99 / US 15	Exit 143 on I-99
Upper Fairfield Township	27.3	43.9	PA 87 – Forksville, Montoursville	Eastern terminus
1.000 mi = 1.609 km; 1.000 km = 0.621 mi: Concurrency terminus
