= Fritz Coumbe =

American baseball player (1889–1978)

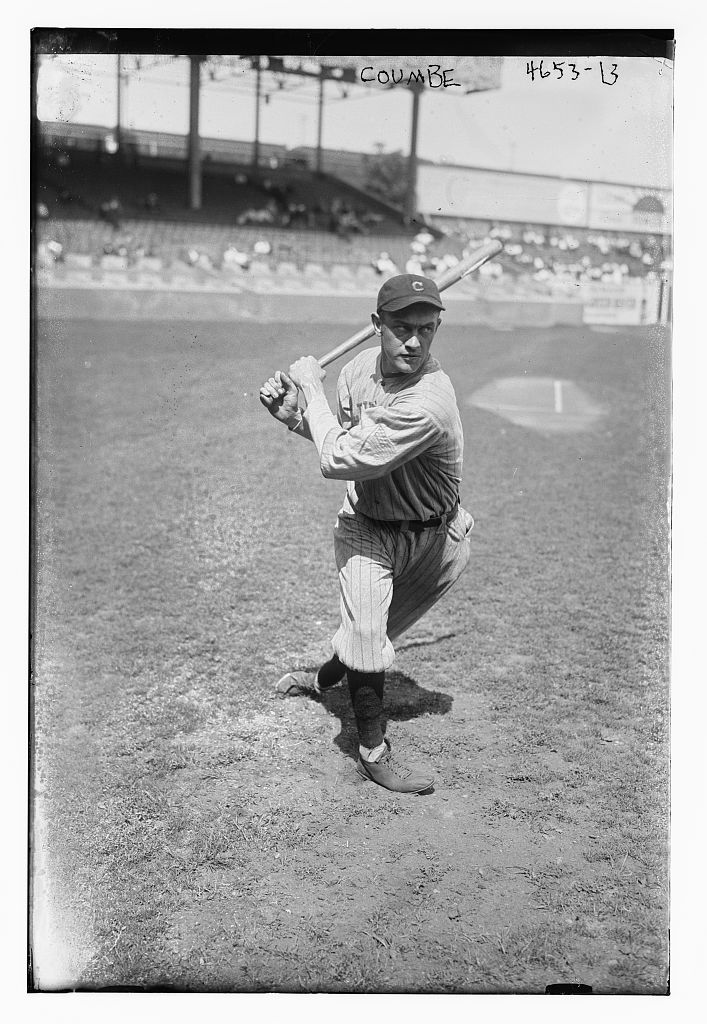
- Pitcher
- Born: December 13, 1889; Antrim, Pennsylvania, U.S.
- Died: March 21, 1978 (aged 88); Paradise, California, U.S.
- Batted: Left Threw: Left

MLB debut
- April 22, 1914, for the Boston Red Sox

Last MLB appearance
- September 19, 1921, for the Cincinnati Reds

MLB statistics
- Win–loss record: 38–38
- Earned run average: 2.80
- Strikeouts: 212
- Stats at Baseball Reference

Teams
- Boston Red Sox (1914); Cleveland Naps/Indians (1914–1919); Cincinnati Reds (1920–1921)

Frederick Nicholas Coumbe (December 13, 1889 – March 21, 1978) was an American pitcher who played in Major League Baseball from 1914 through 1921. Coumbe batted and threw left-handed. He was born in Antrim, Pennsylvania.

== Biography ==
He was born on December 13, 1889, in Antrim, Pennsylvania.

Listed at 6 ft 0 in (1.83 m), 152 lb., Coumbe reached the majors in 1914 with the Boston Red Sox, spending part of this season with them before moving to the Cleveland Naps / Indians (1914–19) and Cincinnati Reds (1920–21). His most productive season came in 1918 with the Indians, when he posted career-highs in wins (13), starts (17), strikeouts (41) and innings pitched (150). Coumbe saved himself from baseball anonymity as one of the few players to appear in the major leagues' last triple-header, played on October 2, 1920 between the Cincinnati Reds and Pittsburgh Pirates at Forbes Field. Cincinnati won the first two games, 13–4 and 7–3, and Pittsburgh won the third, 6–0. He saw action in right field in Game 1 and started at center field in Game 3. After his major league career ended with the Reds, he spent the next decade in the minor leagues, including three seasons with the Salt Lake City Bees.

In an eight-season career, Coumbe posted a 38–38 record with 212 strikeouts and a 2.80 ERA in 761 1/3 innings, including four shutouts and 30 complete games. A good hitting pitcher, he also was used as a pinch-hitter, collecting a .206 batting average (52-for-252) with one home run and 30 RBI.

Coumbe died on March 21, 1978, in Paradise, California at the age of 88.
