= Pennsylvania Route 284 =

Highway in Pennsylvania, United States

Pennsylvania Route 284

Route information
- Maintained by PennDOT
- Length: 9.043 mi (14.553 km)
- Existed: 1928–present

Major junctions
- West end: PA 287 in English Center
- East end: I-99 / US 15 in McNett Township

Location
- Country: United States
- State: Pennsylvania
- Counties: Lycoming

Highway system
- Pennsylvania State Route System; Interstate; US; State; Scenic; Legislative
← PA 283	→ PA 285

Pennsylvania Route 284 (PA 284) is a 9.043-mile-long (14.553 km) state highway located in Lycoming County in Pennsylvania. The western terminus is at PA 287 in English Center and the eastern terminus is at an interchange with Interstate 99 (I-99) in the Buttonwood section of McNett Township. PA 284 was designated as a spur of PA 84 in the 1928 renumbering of state highways in Pennsylvania. The route was paved in 1932 and has remained relatively untouched since, although PA 84 was re-designated as PA 287 in 1961 to avoid duplication with Interstate 84 (I-84).

== Route description ==
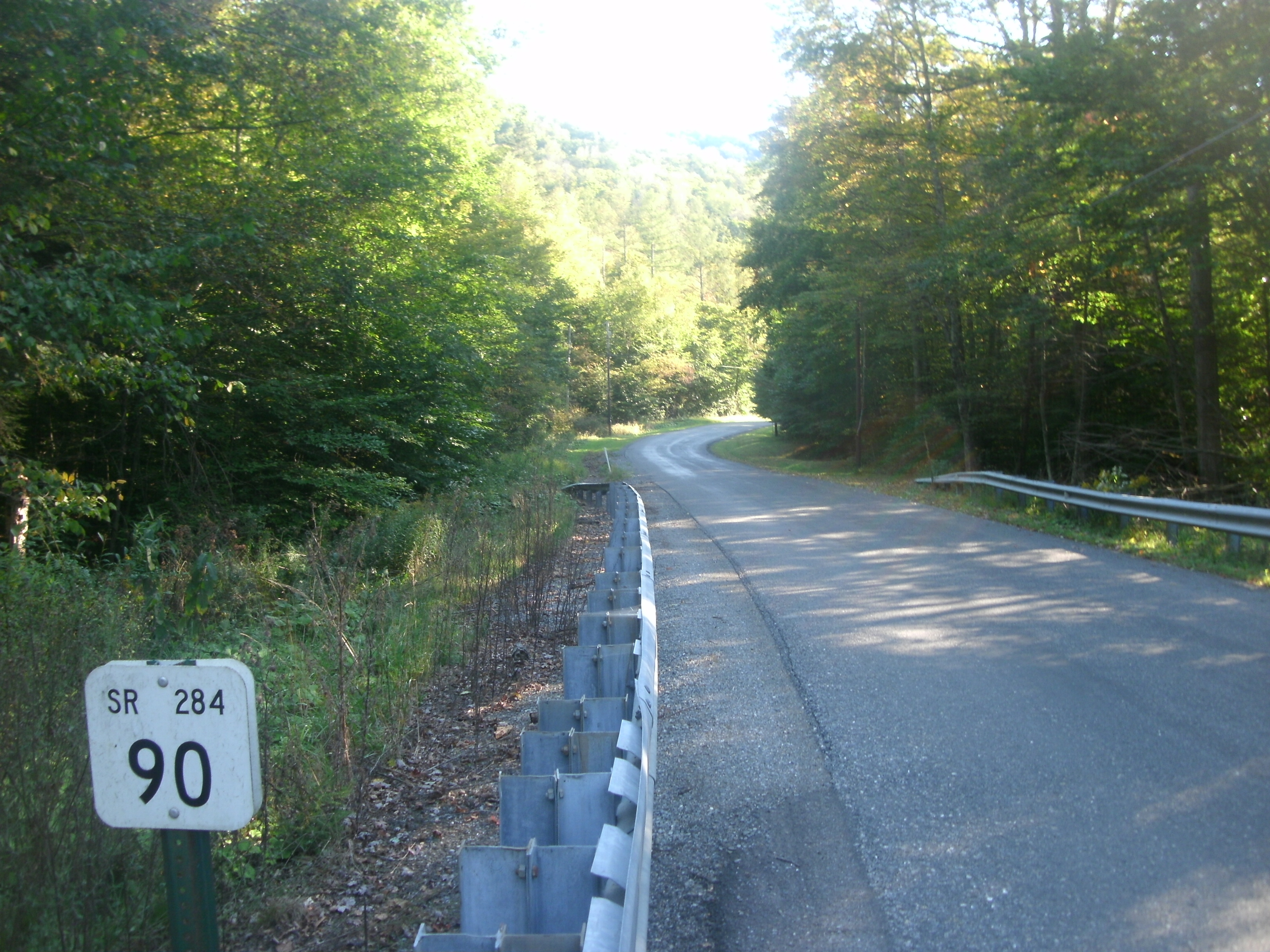
PA 284 heading westbound through Pine Township as a one-lane highway

PA 284 begins at an intersection with PA 287 just north of the village of English Center. The road winds northeast through rural Lycoming County alongside nearby Little Pine Creek. PA 284 runs through Pine Township, soon reaching the newly named Blockhouse Creek (from Little Pine). The two-lane continues through the dense woods in the area, paralleling Blockhouse Creek into the village of Buttonwood. In Buttonwood, PA 284 enters an interchange with I-99/US 15, first intersecting with the ramp to I-99 south. After crossing the freeway, PA 284 curves north and ends at the junction with an on-ramp to I-99 northbound.

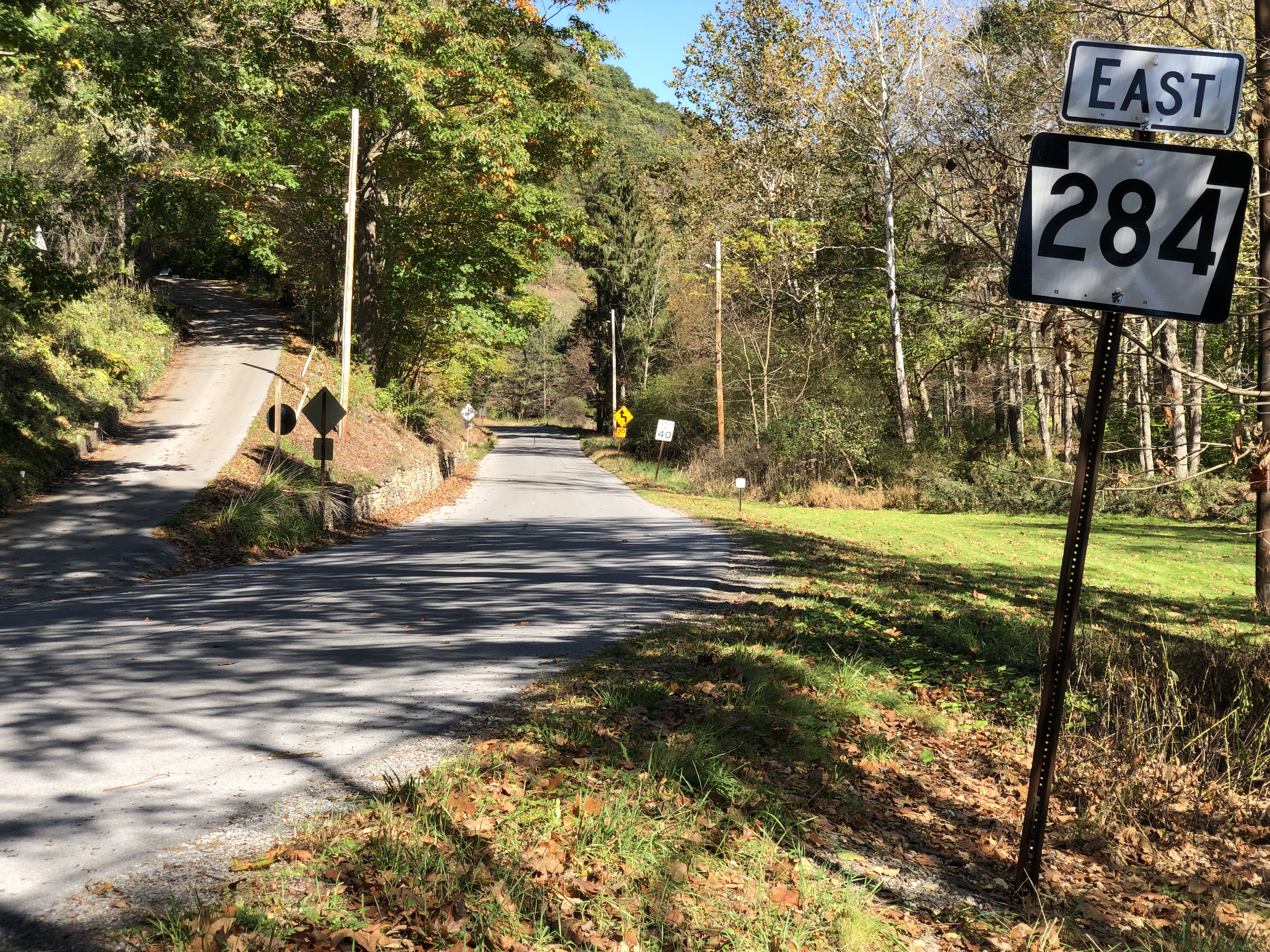
PA 284 eastbound in Pine Township

== History ==
A road in the location of PA 284 first shows on maps as early as 1873. PA 284 was first designated along its current alignment during the 1928 renumbering of state highways in Pennsylvania. The designation was done as a spur to the alignment of PA 84, which was designated from Piatt Township to the New York state line. The entire alignment of PA 284 was paved by the Pennsylvania Department of Highways in 1932, including the bridge over Flooks Run and Blacks Creek. However, the alignment has remained relatively unchanged since. In 1961, with the designation of I-84, the alignment of PA 84 was re-designated as PA 287 to avoid duplication. In 1974, PA 284 was adjusted for the construction of the new US 15 alignment. This was adjusted in 1998 with the construction of US 15 for preparations to convert the route to I-99.

== Major intersections ==
The entire route is in Lycoming County.

Location	mi	km	Destinations	Notes
Pine Township	0.000	0.000	PA 287 – Salladasburg, Morris	Western terminus; village of English Center
McNett Township	8.330	13.406	I-99 south / US 15 south – Williamsport	Exit 158 on I-99
McNett Township	9.043	14.553	I-99 north / US 15 north – Mansfield	Eastern terminus; village of Buttonwood
1.000 mi = 1.609 km; 1.000 km = 0.621 mi
