= Duncan Township, Tioga County, Pennsylvania =

Township in Pennsylvania, US

Coordinates: 41°37′00″N 77°14′29″W

Duncan Township, Pennsylvania
- Township
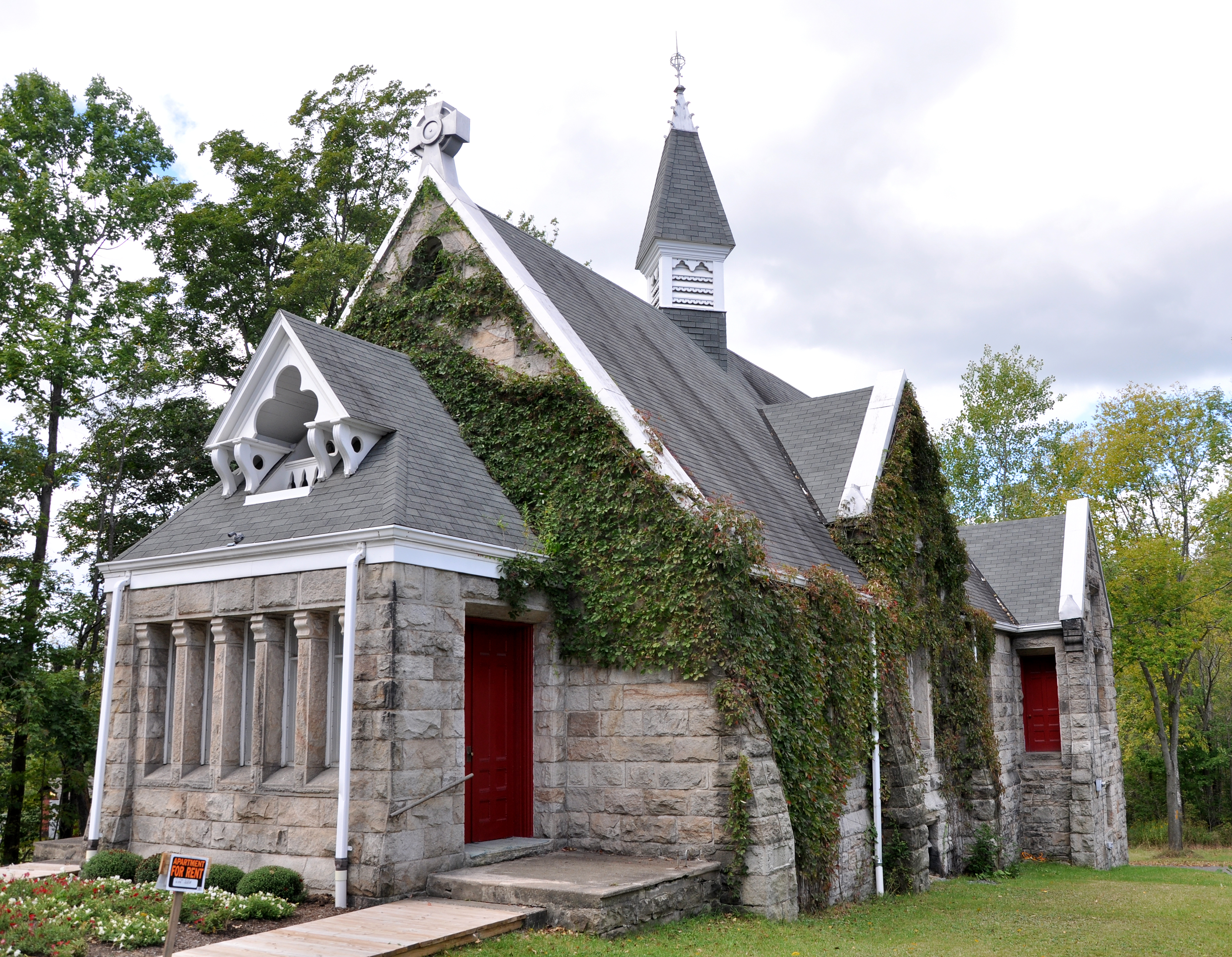
- Former Episcopal church in Antrim

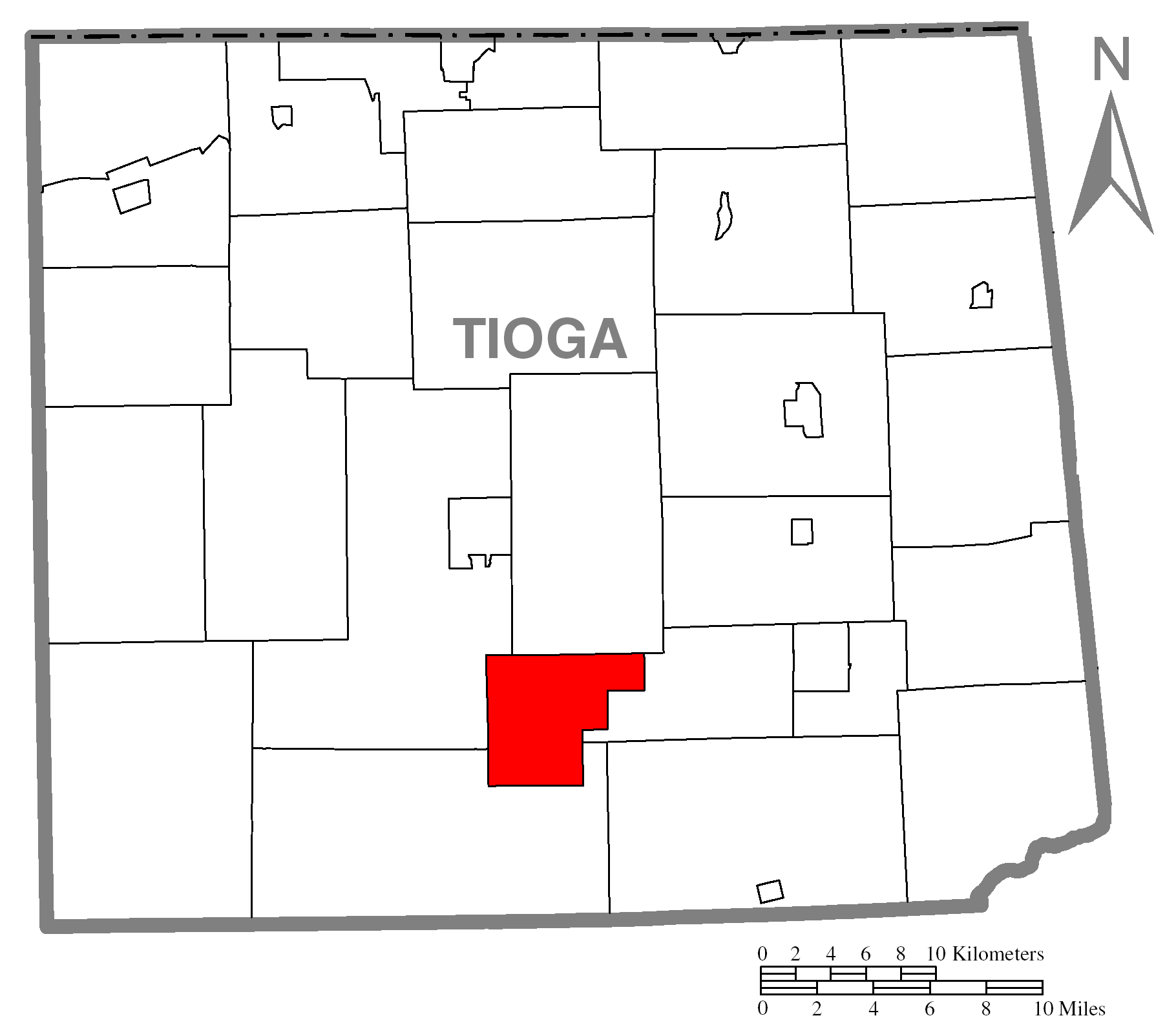
- Map of Tioga County Highlighting Duncan Township

- Map of Pennsylvania highlighting Tioga County
- Country: United States
- State: Pennsylvania
- County: Tioga
- Settled: 1867
- Incorporated: 1873

Area
  - Total: 20.04 sq mi (51.91 km^{2})
  - Land: 20.04 sq mi (51.91 km^{2})
  - Water: 0 sq mi (0.00 km^{2})

Population (2020)
  - Total: 188 ▼
  - Estimate (2023): 190
  - Density: 10.8/sq mi (4.16/km^{2})
- Time zone: Eastern Time Zone (North America)
  - Summer (DST): EDT
- FIPS code: 42-117-20232
- Website: duncantwp.com

Historical population
Census	Pop.	Note	%±
2000	213		—
2010	208		−2.3%
2020	188		−9.6%
2023 (est.)	190		1.1%
U.S. Decennial Census

Duncan Township is a township in Tioga County, Pennsylvania, United States. The population was 188 at the 2020 census.

== Geography ==
According to the United States Census Bureau, the township has a total area of 19.8 square miles (51 km^{2}), all land.

Duncan Township is bordered by Charleston Township to the north, Bloss Township to the east and south, Morris Township to the east, south and west, and Delmar Township to the west and north.

== Demographics ==
As of the census of 2000, there were 213 people, 91 households, and 56 families residing in the township. The population density was 10.8 people per square mile (4.2 people/km^{2}). There were 142 housing units at an average density of 7.2 per square mile (2.8/km^{2}). The racial makeup of the township was 97.65% White, 0.47% African American, 0.94% Native American and 0.94% Asian. Hispanic or Latino of any race were 0.94% of the population.

There were 91 households, out of which 26.4% had children under the age of 18 living with them, 44.0% were married couples living together, 11.0% had a female householder with no husband present, and 37.4% were non-families. 31.9% of all households were made up of individuals, and 18.7% had someone living alone who was 65 years of age or older. The average household size was 2.34 and the average family size was 2.93.

In the township the population was spread out, with 19.2% under the age of 18, 8.0% from 18 to 24, 30.5% from 25 to 44, 24.9% from 45 to 64, and 17.4% who were 65 years of age or older. The median age was 40 years. For every 100 females there were 106.8 males. For every 100 females age 18 and over, there were 95.5 males.

The median income for a household in the township was $28,250, and the median income for a family was $40,625. Males had a median income of $26,875 versus $20,417 for females. The per capita income for the township was $27,001. None of the families and 6.8% of the population were living below the poverty line, including no under eighteens and 2.6% of those over 64.

== Communities and locations ==
- Antrim – A village in the southwestern part of the township, slightly east of Pennsylvania Route 287.
- Brownlee – A village in the northern part of the township, approximately three miles northeast of Antrim.
- Duncan – A village in the central part of the township, between Antrim and Brownlee.
- Tioga State Forest – Much of eastern Duncan Township is covered by the Tioga State Forest.
