= Morris Township, Tioga County, Pennsylvania =

Township in Pennsylvania, US

Coordinates: 41°35′00″N 77°13′59″W

- Township
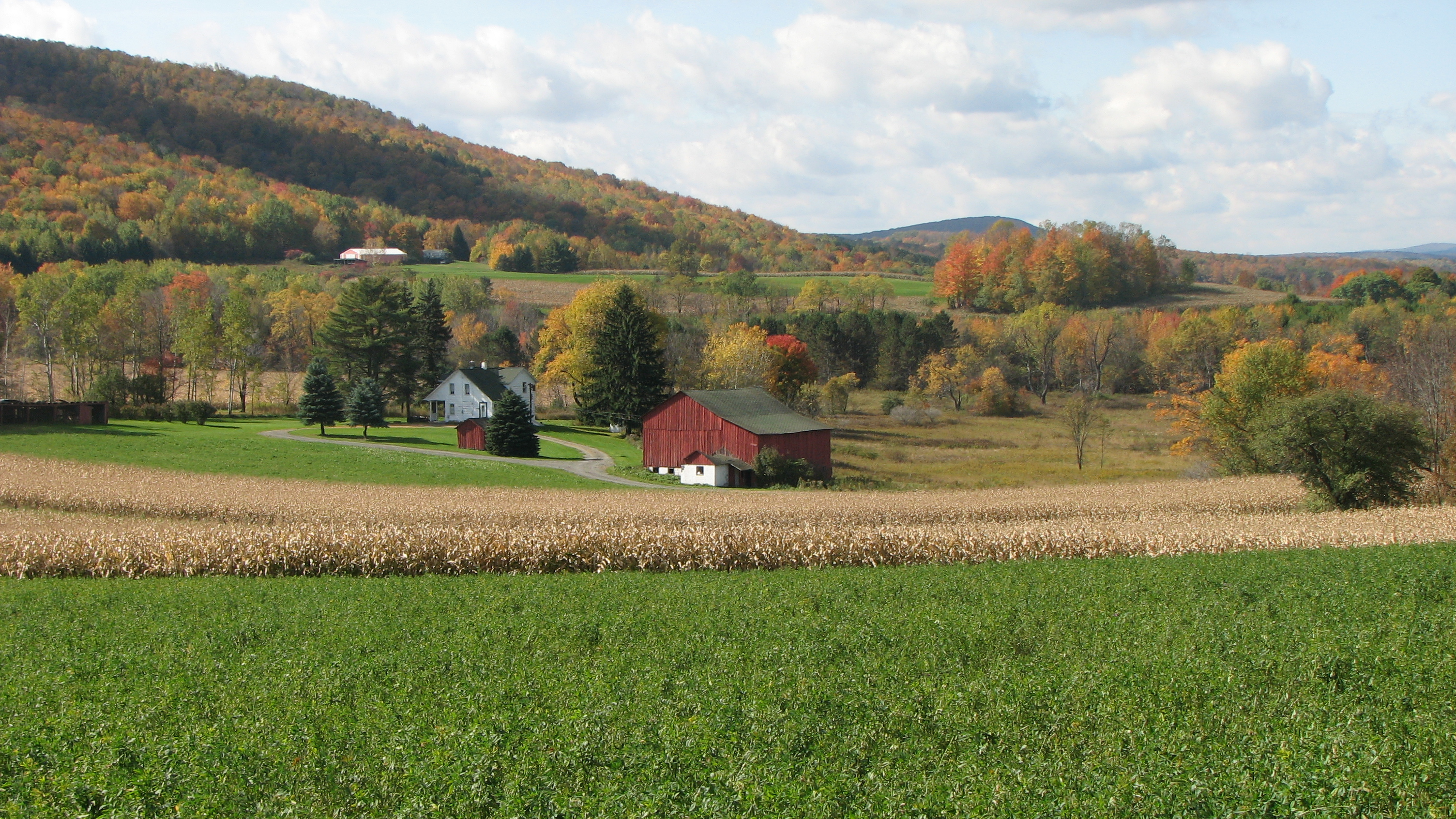
- A farm in Morris Township

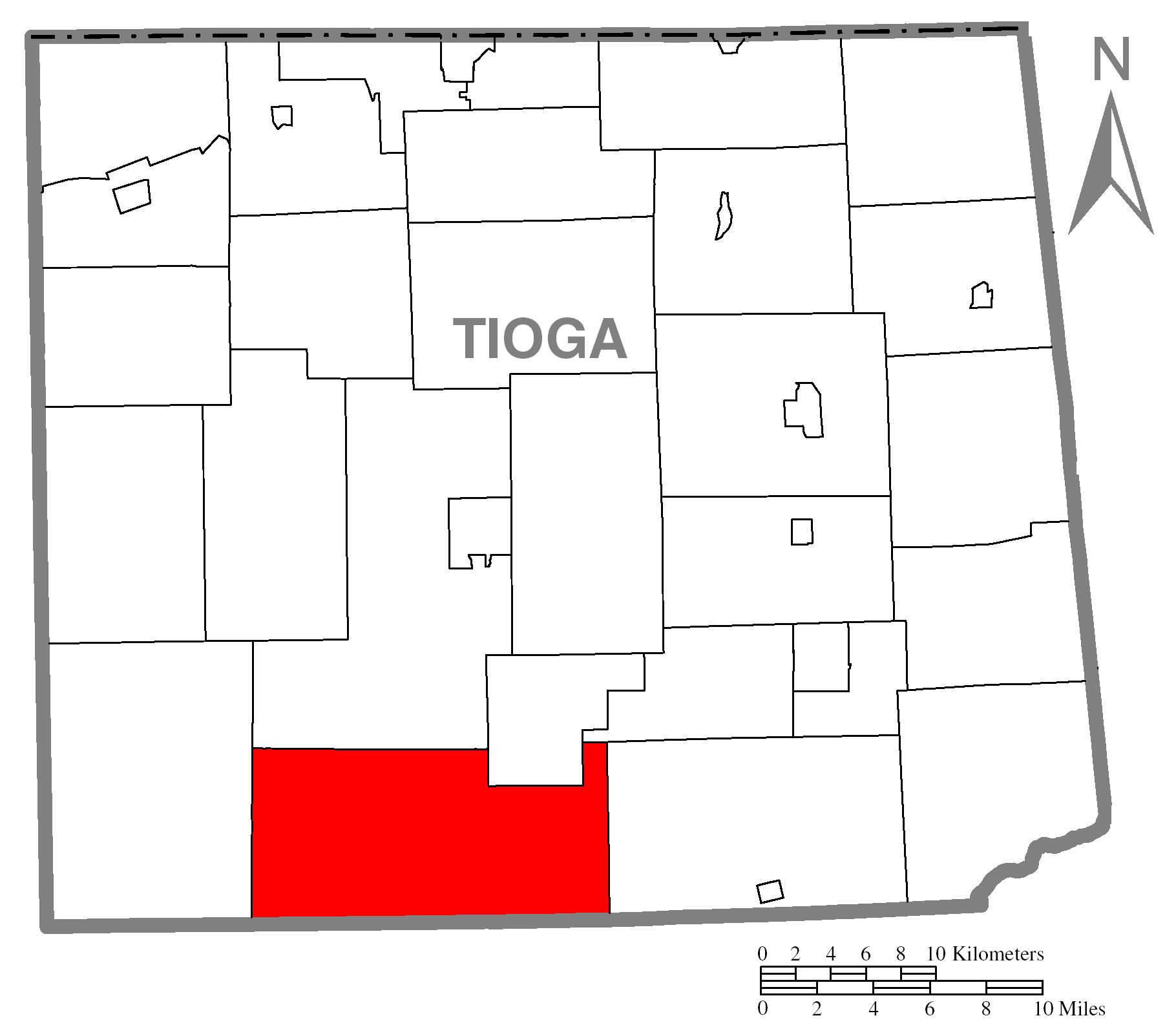
- Map of Tioga County Highlighting Morris Township

- Map of Pennsylvania highlighting Tioga County
- Country: United States
- State: Pennsylvania
- County: Tioga
- Settled: 1800
- Incorporated: 1824

Area
  - Total: 72.17 sq mi (186.91 km^{2})
  - Land: 72.14 sq mi (186.85 km^{2})
  - Water: 0.023 sq mi (0.06 km^{2})

Population (2020)
  - Total: 564 ▼
  - Estimate (2023): 554
  - Density: 8.2/sq mi (3.17/km^{2})
- Time zone: Eastern Time Zone (North America)
  - Summer (DST): EDT
- FIPS code: 42-117-51096

Historical population
Census	Pop.	Note	%±
2000	646		—
2010	606		−6.2%
2020	564		−6.9%
2023 (est.)	554		−1.8%
U.S. Decennial Census

Morris Township is a township in Tioga County, Pennsylvania, United States. The population was 564 at the 2020 census.

== Geography ==
According to the United States Census Bureau, the township has a total area of 73.5 square miles (190.4 km^{2}), of which 73.5 square miles (190.3 km^{2}) is land and 0.04 square mile (0.1 km^{2}) (0.03%) is water.

Morris Township is bordered by Delmar Township to the north. It forms a U shape around the southern part of Duncan Township, bordering Duncan Township to the east, north and west. Bloss Township borders Morris Township's northeastern corner. Liberty Township forms the eastern border. Lycoming County is on the southern border and Elk Township is on the western border.

== Demographics ==
As of the census of 2000, there were 646 people, 246 households, and 184 families residing in the township. The population density was 8.8 people per square mile (3.4/km^{2}). There were 551 housing units at an average density of 7.5/sq mi (2.9/km^{2}). The racial makeup of the township was 98.61% White, 0.15% African American, 0.46% Native American, 0.31% Asian, and 0.46% from two or more races. Hispanic or Latino of any race were 0.31% of the population.

There were 246 households, out of which 29.3% had children under the age of 18 living with them, 64.2% were married couples living together, 7.3% had a female householder with no husband present, and 24.8% were non-families. 21.5% of all households were made up of individuals, and 15.0% had someone living alone who was 65 years of age or older. The average household size was 2.56 and the average family size was 2.97.

In the township the population was spread out, with 23.8% under the age of 18, 4.6% from 18 to 24, 23.7% from 25 to 44, 26.2% from 45 to 64, and 21.7% who were 65 years of age or older. The median age was 43 years. For every 100 females, there were 106.4 males. For every 100 females age 18 and over, there were 105.9 males.

The median income for a household in the township was $27,885, and the median income for a family was $31,786. Males had a median income of $21,625 versus $21,429 for females. The per capita income for the township was $13,519. About 11.7% of families and 13.7% of the population were below the poverty line, including 14.4% of those under age 18 and 10.6% of those age 65 or over.

== Communities and locations ==
- Blackwell – A village on Pennsylvania Route 414 in the southern part of the township.
- Doane – A village on Pennsylvania Route 414 in the central part of the township, a few miles northeast of Blackwell.
- Hoytville – A village at the junction of Pennsylvania Route 414 and Pennsylvania Route 287.
- Lorenton – A village on Pennsylvania Route 287 that is on the border with Pine Township in Lycoming County.
- Morris – A village at the junction of Pennsylvania Routes 414 and 287, about a mile northeast of Hoytville.
- Mount Pleasant – A village on Pennsylvania Route 287 in the southern part of the township.
- Pine Creek Gorge – The scenic Pine Creek Gorge runs through western Morris Township.
- Plank – A village in the southeast part of the township.
- Three Springs Run – A village about a mile southwest of Plank and about two miles east of Mount Pleasant.
- Tioga State Forest – Much of western and central Morris Township is covered by the Tioga State Forest.
