= Little Pine Creek =

Creek in Lycoming County, Pennsylvania, United States

Coordinates: 41.35009°N 77.35668°W

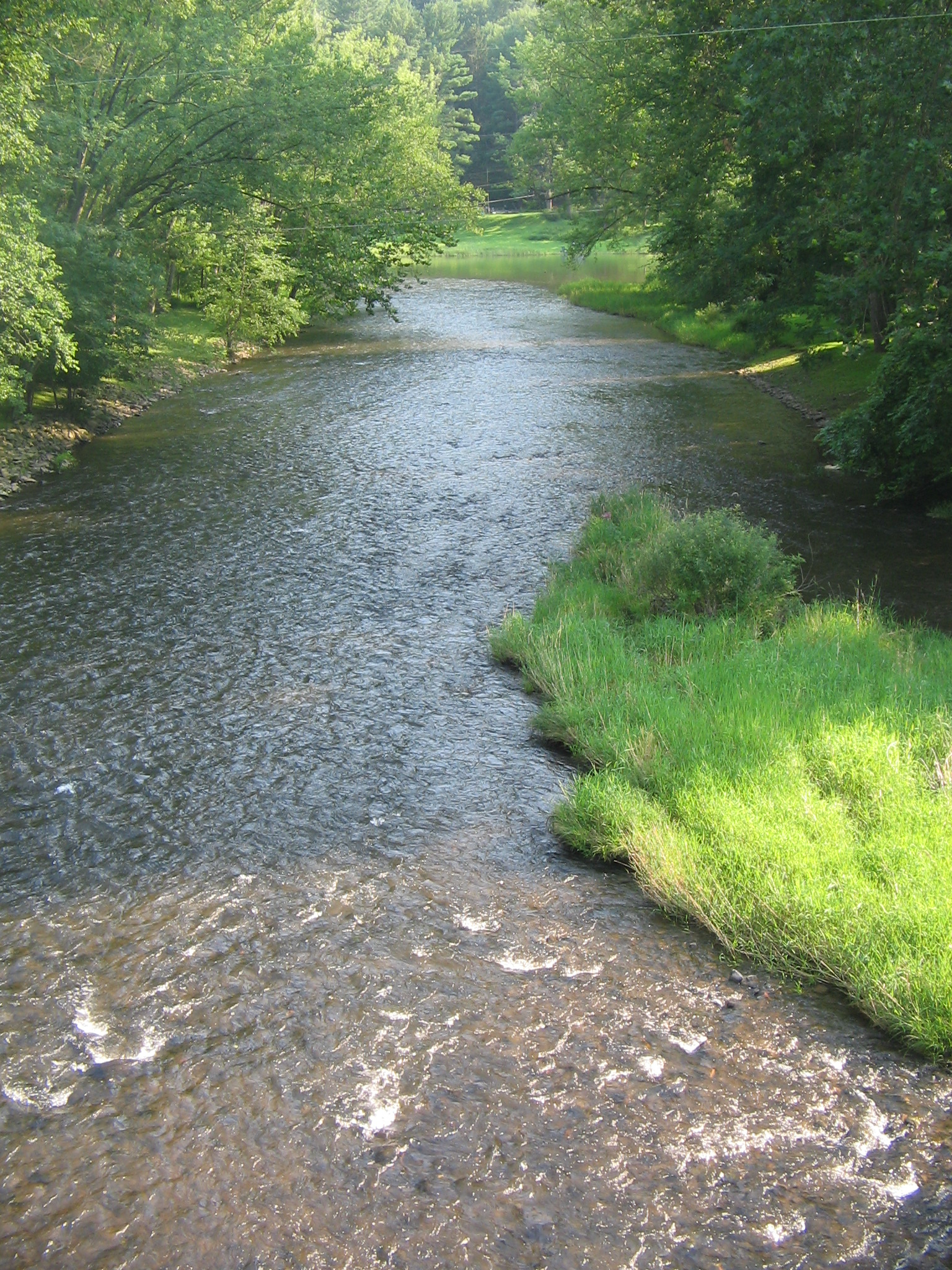
Little Pine Creek, looking downstream towards the mouth from the Pine Creek Rail Trail bridge over it in the village of Waterville, Cummings Township, Lycoming County.

Little Pine Creek is a tributary of Pine Creek in Lycoming County, Pennsylvania, in the United States. It is approximately 15.8 miles (25.4 km) long and flows through Pine Township and Cummings Township.

== Course ==
Little Pine Creek begins at the confluence of Texas Creek and Blockhouse Creek in Pine Township. It flows roughly southwest, parallel to Pennsylvania Route 284 and receives the tributaries Bear Run, Bonell Run, and Lick Run. The creek then passes through English Center. Further downstream, it receives the tributaries Coal Run, Callahans Run, and Otter Run. The creek then enters Cummings Township, where it passes through a dam known as the Little Pine Dam. On the southern side of the dam, it turns south and meanders several miles until it crosses Pennsylvania Route 44 and reaches its confluence with Pine Creek.

Little Pine Creek joins Pine Creek 13.84 miles (22.27 km) upstream of its mouth.

== Geography and watershed ==
The watershed of Little Pine Creek has an area of 180 square miles (470 km^{2}).

Little Pine Creek is said to resemble a smaller version of Pine Creek. The velocity of its waters is also faster than those of Pine Creek. The creek's valley is narrow and resembles a canyon in its lower reaches. Groves of sycamore and summer camps are found along the valley.

A dam that is 120 feet (37 m) high is on Little Pine Creek.

== Recreation ==
It is possible to canoe on 15.6 miles (25.1 km) of Little Pine Creek during snowmelt or within four days of heavy rain. The difficulty rating of the creek is between A and 2-. The scenery along it is described as "good" by Edward Gertler in his book Keystone Canoeing.

Little Pine Creek flows through Little Pine Creek State Park for part of its length.

== See also ==
- List of rivers of Pennsylvania
