= Antrim, Pennsylvania =

Unincorporated community in Pennsylvania, US

- Unincorporated community
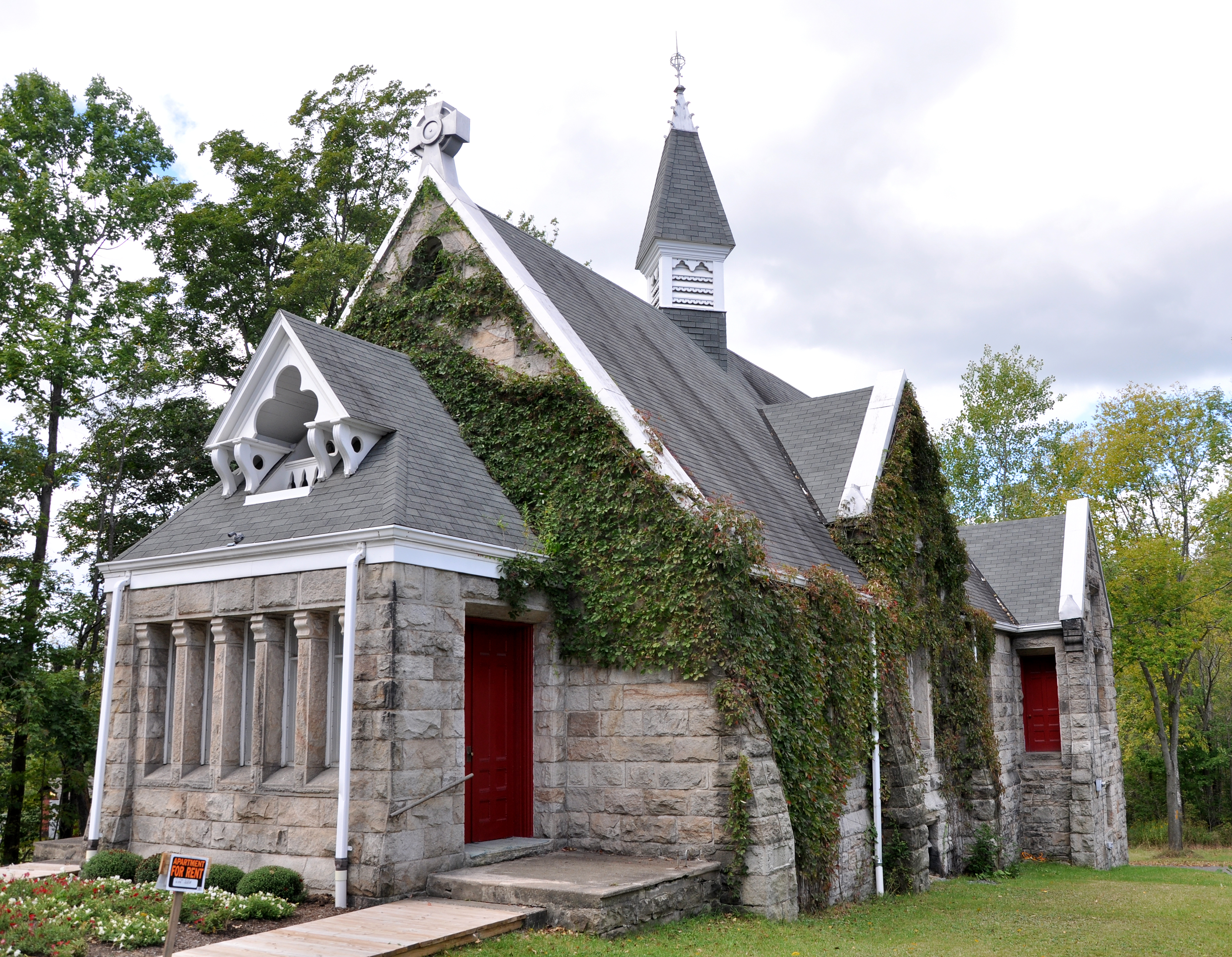
- Trinity Church Antrim on Main Street

- Location within Pennsylvania
- Coordinates: 41°38′02″N 77°17′13″W
- Country: United States
- State: Pennsylvania
- County: Tioga
- Elevation: 1,654 ft (504 m)
- Time zone: UTC-5 (Eastern (EST))
  - Summer (DST): UTC-4 (EDT)
- ZIP: 16901
- Area code: 570
- GNIS feature ID: 1168343

Antrim is an unincorporated community in Duncan Township, Tioga County, in the U.S. state of Pennsylvania. It lies slightly east of Pennsylvania Route 287 between Williamsport and Wellsboro. It is named for County Antrim in Ireland.
