= Pennsylvania Route 287 =

State highway in Pennsylvania, US

Pennsylvania Route 287
- Major highways in northern Pennsylvania with PA 287 in red

Route information
- Maintained by PennDOT
- Length: 63.965 mi (102.942 km)
- Existed: 1961–present

Major junctions
- South end: Future I-99 / US 220 in Piatt Township
- PA 973 in Salladasburg; PA 184 in Pine Township; PA 284 in Pine Township; PA 414 in Hoytville; PA 660 in Wellsboro; US 6 in Wellsboro; PA 249 in Middlebury Township; I-99 / US 15 in Tioga Township; PA 328 in Tioga Junction
- North end: PA 49 in Lawrenceville

Location
- Country: United States
- State: Pennsylvania
- Counties: Lycoming, Tioga

Highway system
- Pennsylvania State Route System; Interstate; US; State; Scenic; Legislative
← PA 286	→ PA 288
← I-84	PA 84	→ PA 85

Pennsylvania Route 287 (PA 287) is a 63.9-mile-long (102.8 km) state highway in the Tioga Valley of Pennsylvania, United States. PA 287 runs from an intersection with U.S. Route 220 (US 220) in the community of Larrys Creek in Piatt Township, Lycoming County, north to an intersection with PA 49 just south of the New York state line in Lawrenceville, Tioga County. The route follows Larrys Creek through several isolated communities, including Salladasburg and English Center, before working its way towards Hoytville, where it meets PA 414. The route ends up in Wellsboro, where it meets US 6, and reaches Tioga.

The alignment of PA 287 has been successor to a set of plank roads from Larrys Creek to Lawrenceville. The southern plank road, known as the Larrys Creek Plank Road, dates back to 1850 as short highway from Larrys Creek to Salladasburg, and was completely gone by 1900. The second part followed the Tioga and Lawrenceville Plank Road, which although is named from Tioga to Lawrenceville, went from Wellsboro to Tioga. The portion to Lawrenceville was never constructed. The route also followed several postal routes in the area. In 1911, the Sproul Road Bill was passed, and PA 287 became segments of Legislative Route 22, Legislative Route 106, and Legislative Route 353. In 1924, the northernmost portion was designated Route 4 and the Susquehanna Trail. This was changed to part of US 220 in 1926.

In 1928, US 111 was designated, and along with Pennsylvania Route 84, consisted of the alignment of PA 287. US 111 was redesignated as part of US 15. The highway was redesignated as PA 287 in 1961 when PA 84 was decommissioned in favor of Interstate 84 (I-84). The route was extended from Tioga to Lawrenceville in 2008, when the construction of US 15 was finished to the New York state line, and PA 287 was extended to PA 49.

== History ==
=== Old roads ===
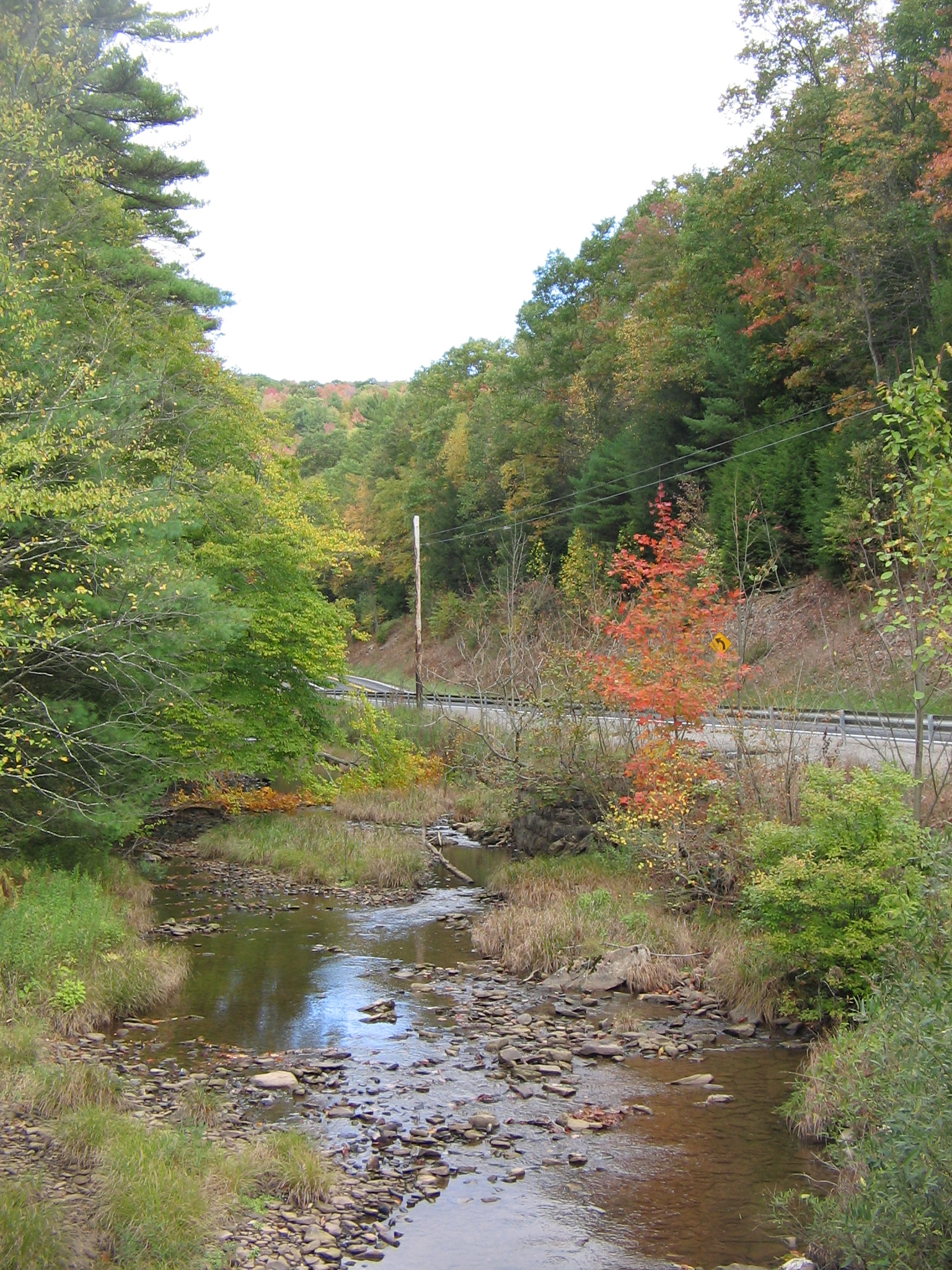
PA 287 follows the Larrys Creek. The highway is visible in the back of the picture.

Much of the current-day alignment for PA 287 has been constructed through many different post, plank and turnpike roads in Lycoming and Tioga counties. The earliest known plank road in the area of the current day highway dates back to 1810, when a mail postal route was created along current day PA 287 from Wellsboro to Willardsburg (later known as Tioga). The mail was delivered once a week on horseback for several years, with the service discontinued in 1818. That year, the service was changed to a semi-weekly service for delivery two times a week on horseback. In 1824, this service was also discontinued when the mail route began to be used by coaches three times a week. This service was used and then decommissioned by 1835, when a new system, which stretched from Wellsboro and past Willardsburg to the community of Lawrenceville, was established.

This route followed the alignment of PA 287, making stops in Middlebury Center, Holliday, Willardsburg and Mitchell's Creek before ending in Lawrenceville. This mail route was truncated back to Willardsburg in 1840, when the nearby Corning and Blossburg Railroad was completed. The stagecoach lines started working along the three-day process for about ten years, when the nearby Tioga and Wellsboro Plank Road was completed, which made stagecoaches run daily. Along with numerous competition, the service was discontinued in 1872, when the Lawrenceville and Wellsboro Railroad was completed. At that time, the stagecoach lines has ceased operation. By 1883, the only piece of mail routes in the area of Tioga County was a piece near Middlebury Center, but was not as large as the process once was.

Although the Corning and Blossburg Railroad had served as a good travel connection between Wellsboro and Lawrenceville (the Tioga Valley), several communities in the Crooked Creek Valley felt they were not well accommodated. At that time, in locations where railroads were not a feasible option, the construction of plank roads became a highly popular option. In 1848, the Pennsylvania State Legislature approved and chartered construction of a brand new plank road in the valley, to be called the Tioga and Elmira Plank Road, following the alignments of current-day PA 287, PA 328 and New York State Route 328 to Elmira, New York. Construction was unable to start in 1848, so a supplement to the charter was amended on April 5, 1849, which extended the work period to continue until 1856. Yet another supplement was added in 1850, when the Tioga and Lawrenceville Plank Road was chartered on May 14.

This new plank road also had the ability to extend their plank road down to Wellsboro, which repealed the acts of 1848 and 1849. The plank road was contracted and completed in a timely fashion down to Wellsboro from Tioga. In 1851, the plank road was complete from Wellsboro to Tioga, and the thoroughfare became highly used by people transporting lumber, agriculture and merchandise. This helped farmers and producers in the communities of Middlebury Center, Holliday and Delmar (now the area of Wellsboro Junction). The plank road would eventually get worn out from use, and the route was eventually changed from a plank road to a high use turnpike. The 17 miles (27 km) long piece of plank road, created in the original charter from Tioga to Lawrenceville, was never constructed.

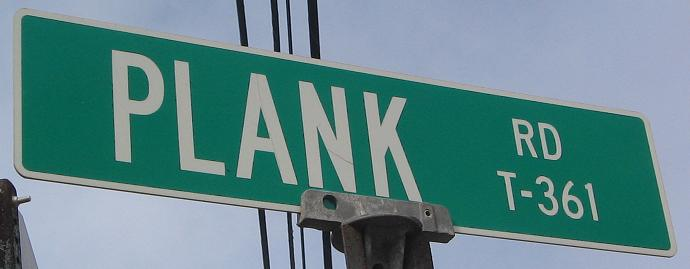
Plank Road (Township Road 361) blade sign. This is the remaining piece of the plank road along Larrys Creek, but the alignment is now pavement.

The southernmost portion of PA 287 was the location of a third plank road, this time beginning at the mouth of Larrys Creek in the eponymous community to the current day location of English Center. The road was first considered during the early 19th century; James Williamson, a strong local entrepreneur lived in these areas and it is assumed that the road builders in this area of Lycoming County were in favor of his suggestions. On May 8, 1850, the Pennsylvania State Legislature chartered a brand new plank road along the riverbank of Larrys Creek. The stock of the plank road was 20 shares of $40.00 (1850 USD). Williamson himself was awarded the job as contractor, and in 1850, using full advantage of woodsmen who were unemployed, low wages, and wasted hemlock log trees, began construction.

By 1851, the plank road had been constructed all the way to the community of Salladasburg. With the 8 feet (2.4 m)-wide plank road came several tollhouses along the entire route to pay charge for using the roadway. A movable barrier was also installed, so people could not gain access without payment. The plank road was finished and prospered for many years. The common transport on the road was bark and hides, along with hauling leather over to the Larrys Creek Railroad. On June 1, 1889, a major flood hit the area around the plank road, and when things were all said and done, it had experienced extensive damage. In places where damage had occurred, the road was replaced by graded dirt roads. In 1900, the remains of the plank road remained only from Salladasburg to the Larrys Creek Railroad Station. Later that year, a petition was raised to make this remaining piece of road free to access. The case was closed in support of the motion and the plank road company shut down forever.

=== Designation of PA 84 ===
Pennsylvania Route 84
- Location: Larrys Creek – Tioga
- Existed: 1928–1961

On May 31, 1911, the state of Pennsylvania signed the Sproul Road Bill, which started a drastic state takeover of highways around the commonwealth. Originally, only several routes were assigned around the state. The bill had approved a road from Wellsboro to the New York state line, which was designated as Legislative Route 22. At the time, this was the only state-maintained portion of PA 287 that was in use. By 1915, more of PA 287 was taken over by the state, with the portion from the current-day intersection with PA 414 in Morris Township to the intersection with PA 660 in Wellsboro becoming designated as Legislative Route 106, where it reached Legislative Route 22 and 21. In 1916, the portion from Legislative Route 23 (now the intersection with US 220) in Larrys Creek to the community of Brookside was taken over as Legislative Route 353.

The designations remained in place until 1924, when actual route designations were assigned in the commonwealth. The part that was later made as part of US 15, which was then changed to an alignment of Route 287, was designated as PA 4 (over the Susquehanna Trail). The route received another designation in 1926, upon the creation of United States Highways across the country. The portion from Tioga to an intersection with the current day US 15 was designated as part of US 220.

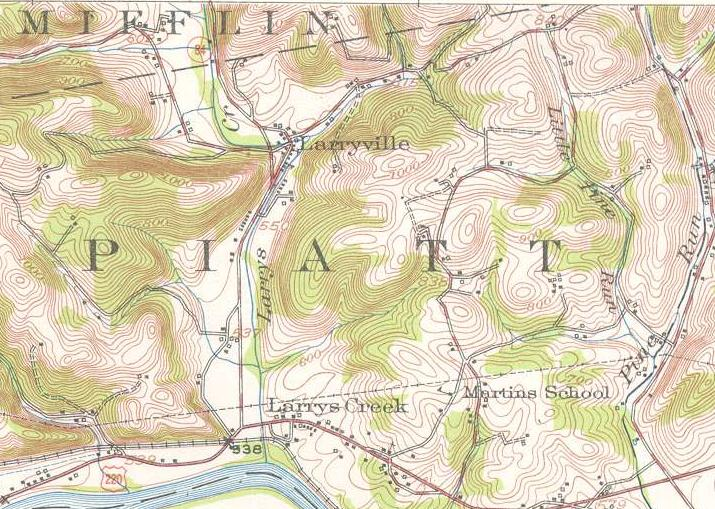
A 1953 United States Geological Survey quadrangle marking PA 84, the precedent to PA 287

This remained in place for only two years, and when the Pennsylvania Department of Highways redesignated highways across the entire commonwealth, the alignment of the US 220 portion was redesignated as US 111, while the entire alignment of PA 287 from the Larrys Creek to Tioga was redesignated as PA 84. The entire alignment of PA 84 consisted of an intersection with US 220 in Larrys Creek to US 111 in Tioga, where the highway terminated. In 1930, the concurrent piece of Legislative Route 4 was decommissioned, and the alignment of the highway remained as US 111. The portion from Tioga north remained as US 111 until 1936, when the highway was renumbered to US 15.

In that time, several intersections along PA 287 tied in with several former state highways. During the 1928 numbering, the intersection with PA 414 in Hoytville was designated as PA 893, a local intersection in Antrim was designated as PA 961, and the intersection in Somers Lane was designated as PA 826. The routes were decommissioned in 1955, 1946, and 1941 respectively. After 1946, when a mass decommissioning of state highways occurred, PA 84 remained in place for another 15 years, when the plans arose for I-84, which duplicated the state highway. Because of this duplication, PA 84 was reassigned as PA 287.

=== US 15 conversion ===
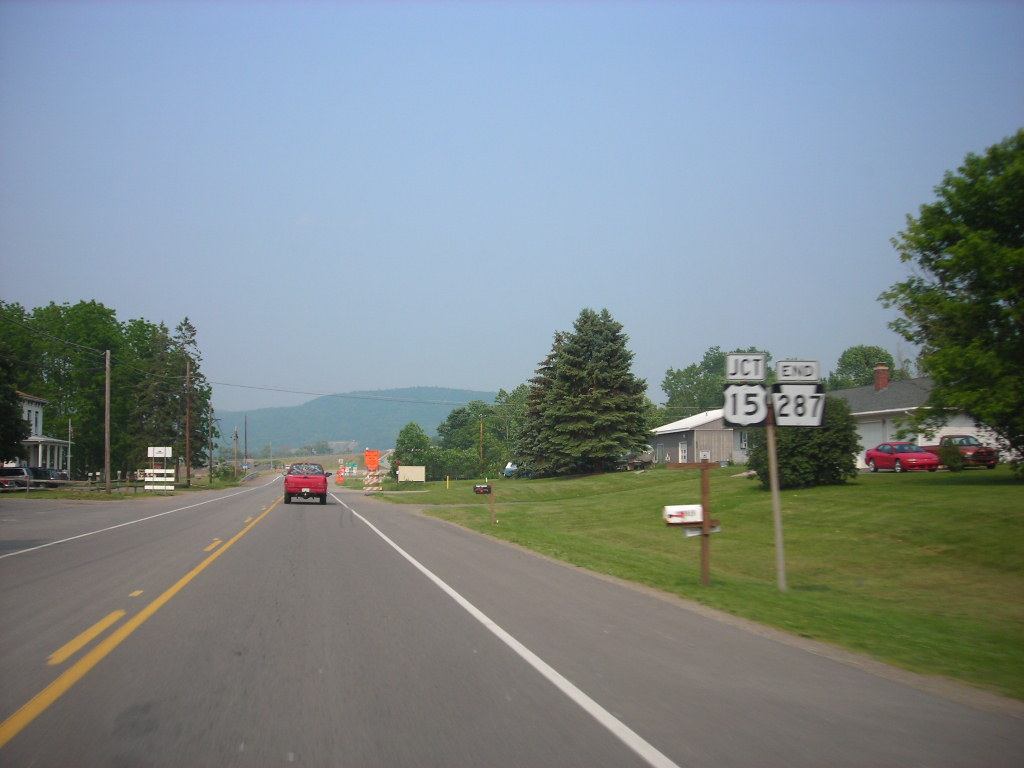
Original northern terminus of PA 287 at US 15 (the Appalachian Thruway)

During the 1960s, plans developed to widen US 15 for safety precautions. Construction progressed fast, reaching the Lycoming County line in 1968. At the time, PA 287 terminated at an intersection with US 15 at the Hammond Reservoir. Ten years later, US 15 was completed up to Tioga, and that year, the Pennsylvania Department of Transportation extended PA 287 to the new interchange. At that point, US 15 followed the northernmost alignment of PA 287 to Lawrenceville. This interchange was completed in late 2000 with an opening ceremony by then-governor Tom Ridge.

With the proposal for the brand new I-99 following US 15's alignment, construction was upgraded once again, and a new alignment for US 15 was started in 2005. The alignment was constructed for the final 5 miles (8.0 km) from Tioga to the state line. With the alignment's completion, US 15 was realigned onto the newly opened freeway on October 1, 2008. The entire project cost $102 million (2008 USD), including one new interchange and the completion of the PA 287 interchange in Tioga.

== Route description ==
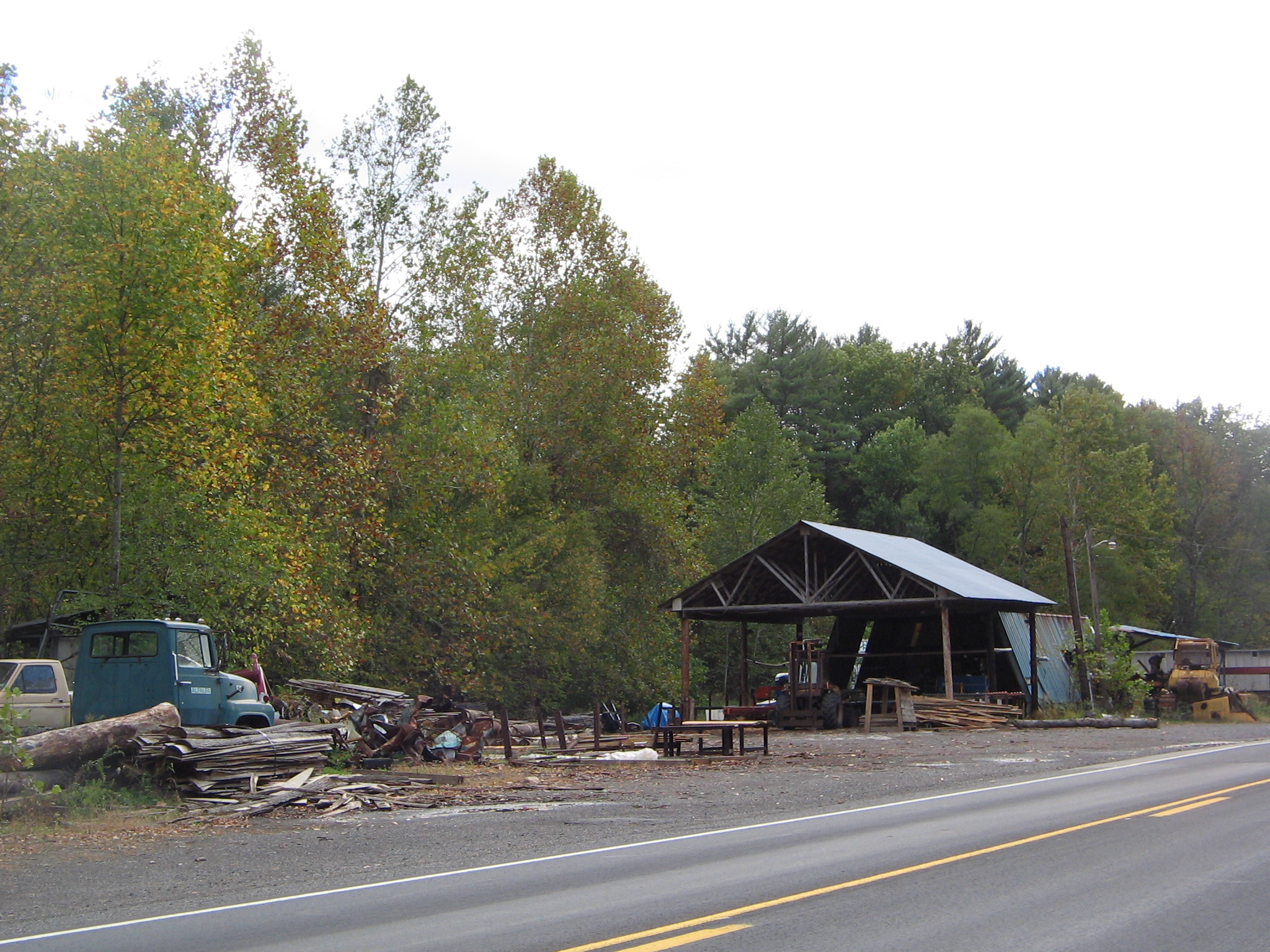
Sawmill along PA 287 in Mifflin Township

=== Lycoming County ===
PA 287 begins at an interchange with westbound US 220 in the Piatt Township community of Larrys Creek. The route heads north, following a former plank road through the rural areas to the west of Williamsport. After a while, the roadway becomes moderately developed, following residential houses for a short distance. The route enters the community of Larrysville, where the route turns to the northwest through a line of forests. PA 287 intersects with Zinck Road, where the roadway becomes highly developed, following the route past residential homes and a large factory. The route crosses through a small patch of forests and enters Mifflin Township, where it intersects with PA 973. PA 973 becomes concurrent with PA 287 here, entering the community of Salladasburg, where the two highways fork. PA 287 continues northward on the right-of-way, while PA 973 heads to the northeast along Main Street. At an intersection with Dochter Street, a connector to PA 973, PA 287 turns to the northwest and leaves Salladasburg.

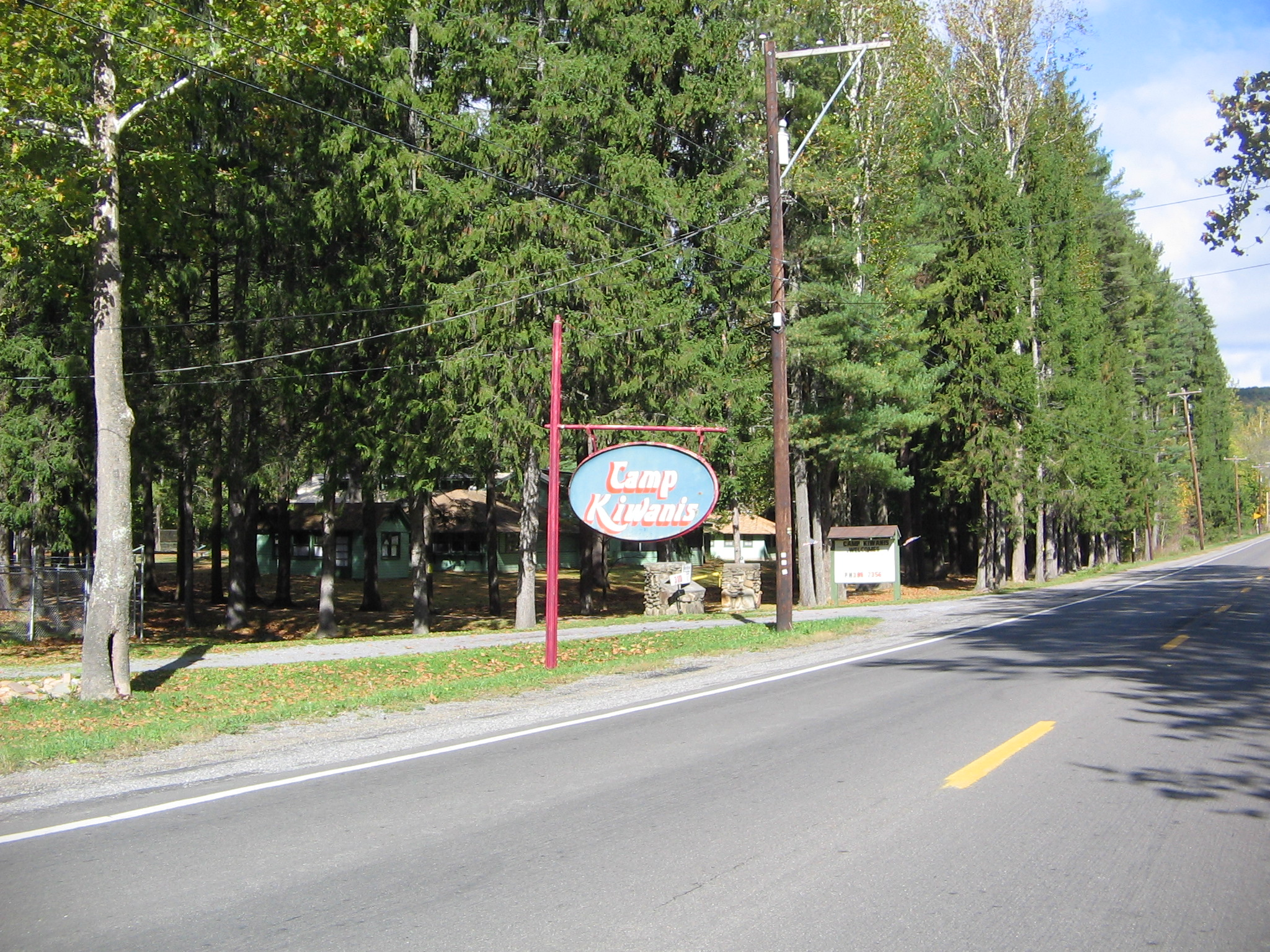
Sign along PA 287 for Camp Kiwanis in Salladasburg

PA 287 continues northward after leaving Salladasburg, paralleling PA 973 for a short distance until the two highways turn away. PA 287 heads northward, passing through deep patches of forests. This alignment and surroundings remain the same for several miles, passing a few local roads. The deep forests begin to clear as the highway enters the community of Brookside. In Brookside, PA 287 winds along a deep field, intersecting with the southern terminus of PA 184, which heads to the northeast. The route turns to the northwest, paralleling with Hughes Road, which merges in soon after. The highway continues northward in the fields north of Brookside until after Hughes Road, where it enters deep forests once again.

PA 287 winds around curves, until the intersection with Lick Run Road, where it turns to the northwest, entering the isolated community of English Center. In English Center, the route intersects with Little Pine Creek Road, where PA 287 turns to the north. The route returns to the deep forests, intersecting with PA 284. PA 287 turns to the northwest at that intersection, continuing through the deep forests. After several miles, the route turns to the northeast, passing to the west of a large pond. The forests began to clear as PA 287 enters the community of Pine Township, where the route continues northward, through fields and tree patches. At an intersection with Granger Lane, PA 287 crosses the county line into Tioga County.

=== Tioga County ===
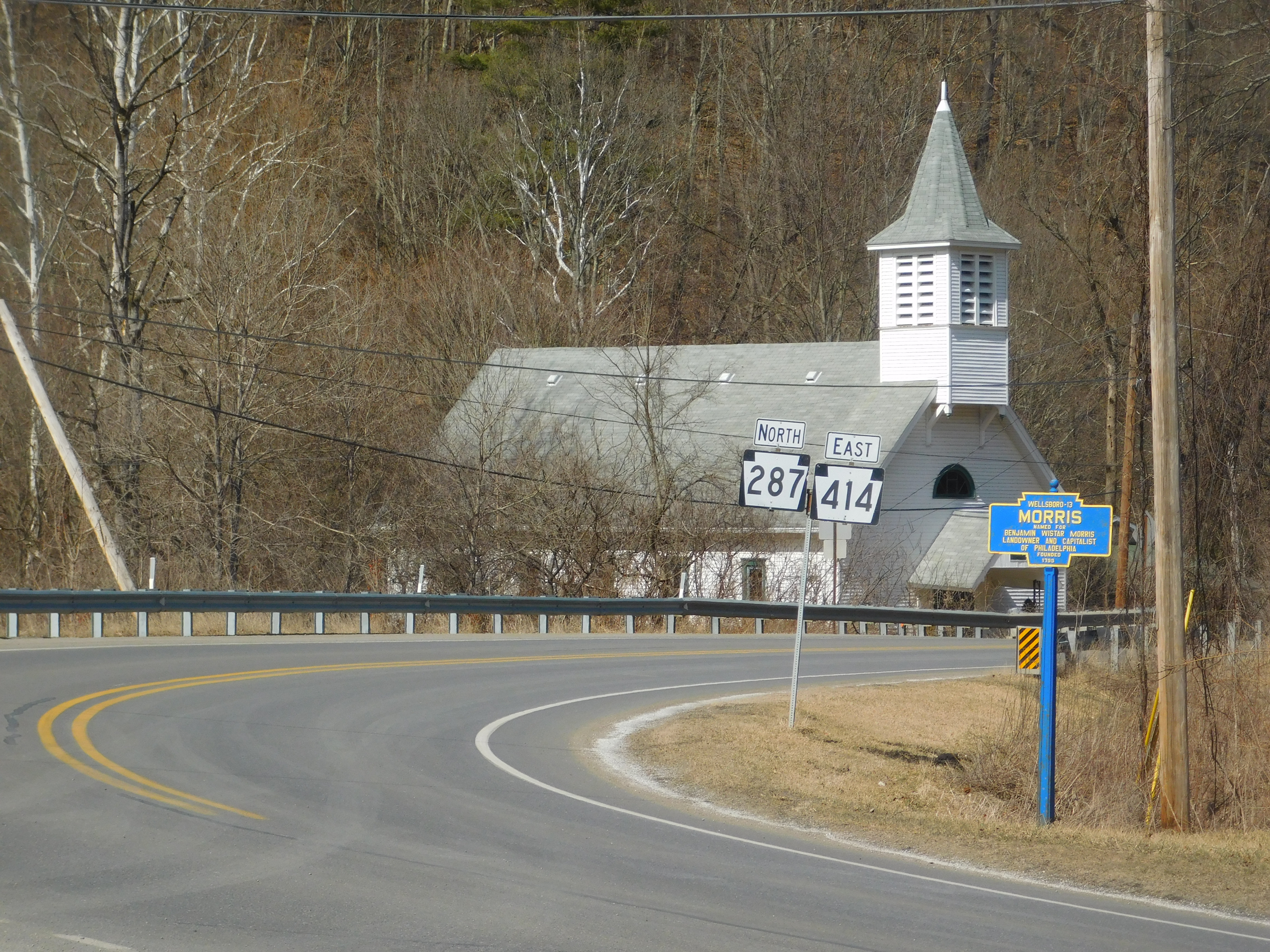
Signage along PA 287 and PA 414 in Hoytville

After entering Tioga County, PA 287 continues to the north, entering the community of Texas, which mainly consists of large fields. The highway continues along this right-of-way, passing a large factory before entering the community of Mount Pleasant. At an intersection with Mount Pleasant Road, PA 287 turns to the northeast, bending around deep forests. The route crosses Hurney Hill Road, which is where the highway turns to the northwest. When the highway makes a curve to the northeast, PA 287 enters the community of Hoytville.

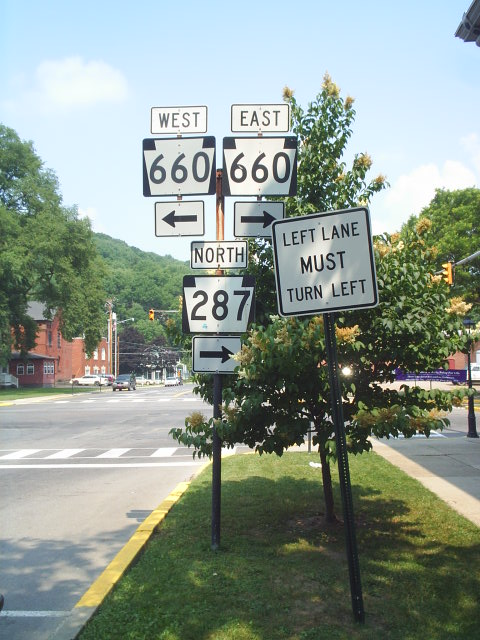
Wellsboro signage for the PA 287 and PA 660 concurrency

In Hoytville, PA 287 intersects with PA 414, which becomes concurrent with PA 287 for a distance. PA 287 and PA 414 continue to the northeast, working its way along the residential homes in Hoytville. A short distance later, the highways enter the highly developed area in Hoytville in Morris Township. At an intersection in the center of the community, PA 287 turns to the north while PA 414 turns to the south, with the two highways splitting. PA 287 turns to the northeast, leaving the downtown area of Morris Township. After Morris Township, most of the route becomes surrounded by forests, except for a distance with residential homes following the northbound lanes. The surroundings return to the deep forests in both directions, with PA 287 continuing northward for several miles.

PA 287 begins to parallel a waterway, entering the community of Antrim, which is surrounded mainly by forests. After Antrim, the highway continues northward through the deep forests for several miles, until entering the community of Knapp. In Knapp, PA 287 continues to the northeast, passing several fields and intersecting with a local road towards Broughton Hollow. At an intersection with Dean Hill Road, the highway turns to the northeast through the fields, entering Coolidge Hollows, a small farming community. At an intersection with Sweetbriar Road, PA 287 turns to the north, passing some homes before turning to the northeast into the farmlands once again. Approaching the intersection with Shumway Hill Road, the highway makes a gradual bend to the northwest, passing a large pond to the west, where it gains the name of Central Avenue as the route enters the community of Wellsboro.

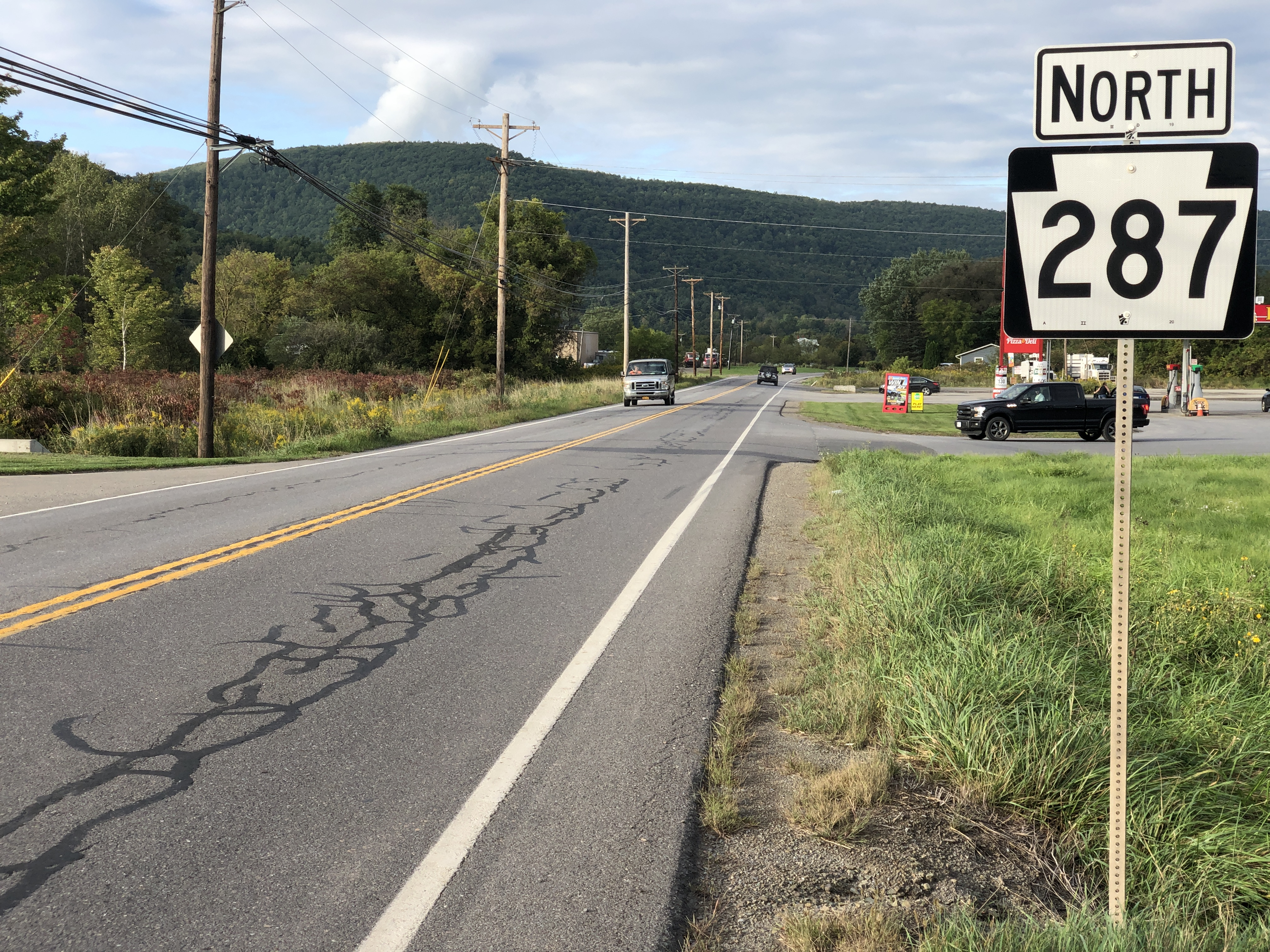
PA 287 northbound at Catlin Hollow Road in Middlebury Township

PA 287 heads along Central Avenue through a highly developed business and residential community until the intersection with PA 660 (Main Street) adjacent to the Tioga County Courthouse, where the highway turns eastward on a concurrency with PA 660. PA 287 and PA 660 continue to the northeast along Main Street in the center of the community, where the two highways intersect with US 6. At the US 6 intersection, PA 660 turns along US 6 east while PA 287 continues along US 6 westbound. US 6 and PA 287 head to the northeast through the community center, passing to the east of Wellsboro Cemetery before the two highways turn to the northwest along Tioga Street. At an intersection with Hillboldt Road, PA 287 and US 6 leave Wellsboro. The two highways enter Stokesdale, a residential community before a fork in the highway, with US 6 turning towards the west and PA 287 towards the north.

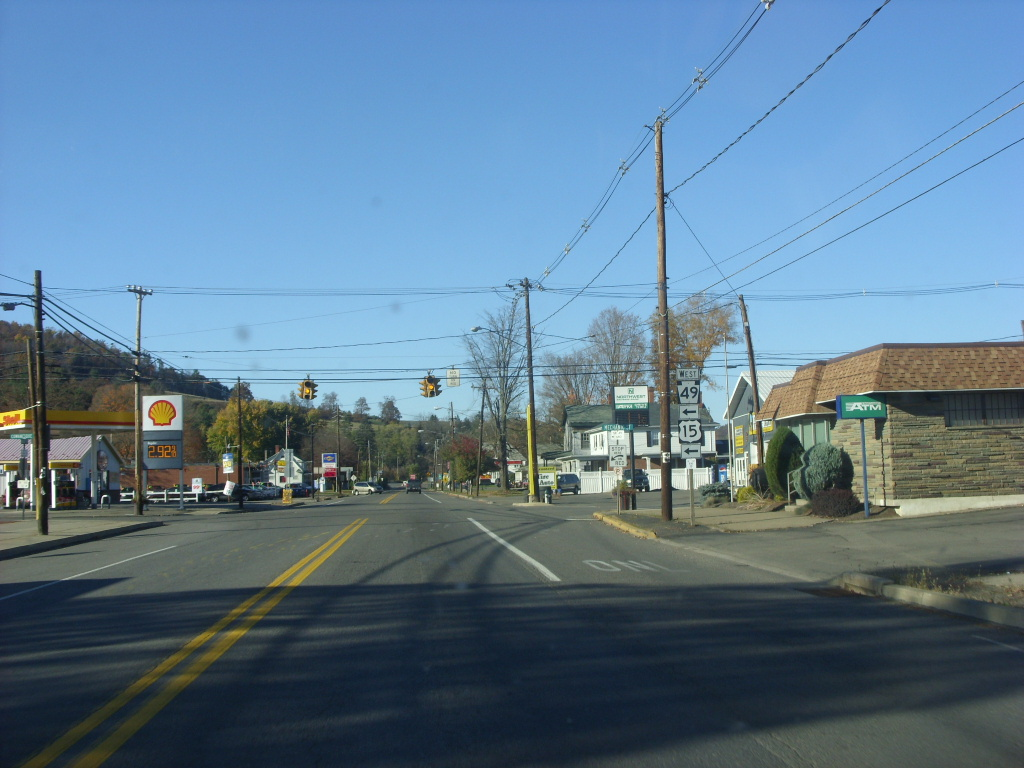
PA 287 at PA 49 in Lawrenceville

PA 287, after the split with US 6, heads to the northeast, entering the community of Wellsboro Junction. Wellsboro Junction is mainly fields, with the route heading as the main highway. After passing a few factories, PA 287 turns to the northeast and out of Wellsboro Junction. The highway passes a large pond, as well as a few residential homes. PA 287 continues along the rural alignment, entering a small community of residential homes and fields. The route continues to the northeast, entering the community of Middlebury Center, where it intersects with the terminus of PA 249 and Mill Plank Road. The route turns to the northeast in the barren residential community. The route crosses over a river and heads on a straight northeast alignment, passing through a residential community. A short distance later, PA 287 turns to the northeast, paralleling a railroad. The route widens to three lanes where it passes a large field. PA 287 turns to the north, reaching the northern terminus of the nearby railroad. The route heads to the north, crossing the Tioga Dam along the Hammond Reservoir and entering the community of Crooked Creek.

The route continues northward along the eastern shore of the reservoir, until the northern end of the reservoir, where it turns to the east, entering the municipality of Tioga. In Tioga, PA 287 heads along Wellsboro Street in a moderately developed part of the community until turning to the north on North Main Street. PA 287 continues along North Main Street until leaving Tioga. A short distance later, PA 287 interchanges with US 15 (the Appalachian Thruway). PA 287 continues along the former alignment of US 15 into Mitchell Creek, a small community. The route heads northward, entering Beeman which consists of a local business center. In the center, PA 287 intersects with the western terminus of PA 328. The route intersects with Somers Lane before entering the community of Somers Lane, which is a barren area. The route heads to the northwest along the Tioga River, crossing another railroad, and soon over the river. After the river, PA 287 enters the municipality of Lawrenceville, where the highway intersects with PA 49's eastern terminus. At that intersection, PA 287 terminates, with the right-of-way continuing the short distance as State Route 1015 to the New York state line.

== Major intersections ==
County	Location	mi	km	Destinations	Notes
Lycoming	Piatt Township	0.000	0.000	Future I-99 / US 220	Southern terminus
Lycoming	Salladasburg	3.606	5.803	PA 973 west – Waterville	Southern end of concurrency with PA 973
Lycoming	Salladasburg	3.664	5.897	PA 973 east – Salladasburg	Northern end of concurrency with PA 973
Lycoming	Pine Township	12.631	20.328	PA 184 east – Steam Valley	Western terminus of PA 184
Lycoming	Pine Township	17.588	28.305	PA 284 east – Buttonwood	Western terminus of PA 284
Tioga	Hoytville	27.691	44.564	PA 414 west – Blackwell, Waterville	South end of concurrency with PA 414
Tioga	Morris Township	28.371	45.659	PA 414 east – Liberty	North end of concurrency with PA 414
Tioga	Wellsboro	40.082	64.506	PA 660 west (Main Street) – Ansonia	South end of concurrency with PA 660
Tioga	Wellsboro	40.275	64.816	US 6 east / PA 660 east (East Avenue) – Mansfield	North end of concurrency with PA 660; southern end of concurrency with US 6
Tioga	Delmar Township	42.884	69.015	US 6 west – Galeton	Northern end of concurrency with US 6
Tioga	Middlebury Township	47.581	76.574	PA 249 north – Keeneyville, Knoxville	Southern terminus of PA 249
Tioga	Tioga Township	58.749– 58.772	94.547– 94.584	I-99 / US 15 – Corning, Mansfield	Exit 191 on I-99
Tioga	Tioga Junction	61.025	98.210	PA 328 east – Elmira	Western terminus of PA 328
Tioga	Lawrenceville	63.965	102.942	PA 49 west (Cowanesque Street) to US 15 – Elkland	Northern terminus; eastern terminus of PA 49
1.000 mi = 1.609 km; 1.000 km = 0.621 mi: Concurrency terminus
