= Pine Township, Lycoming County, Pennsylvania =

Township in Pennsylvania, US

- Township
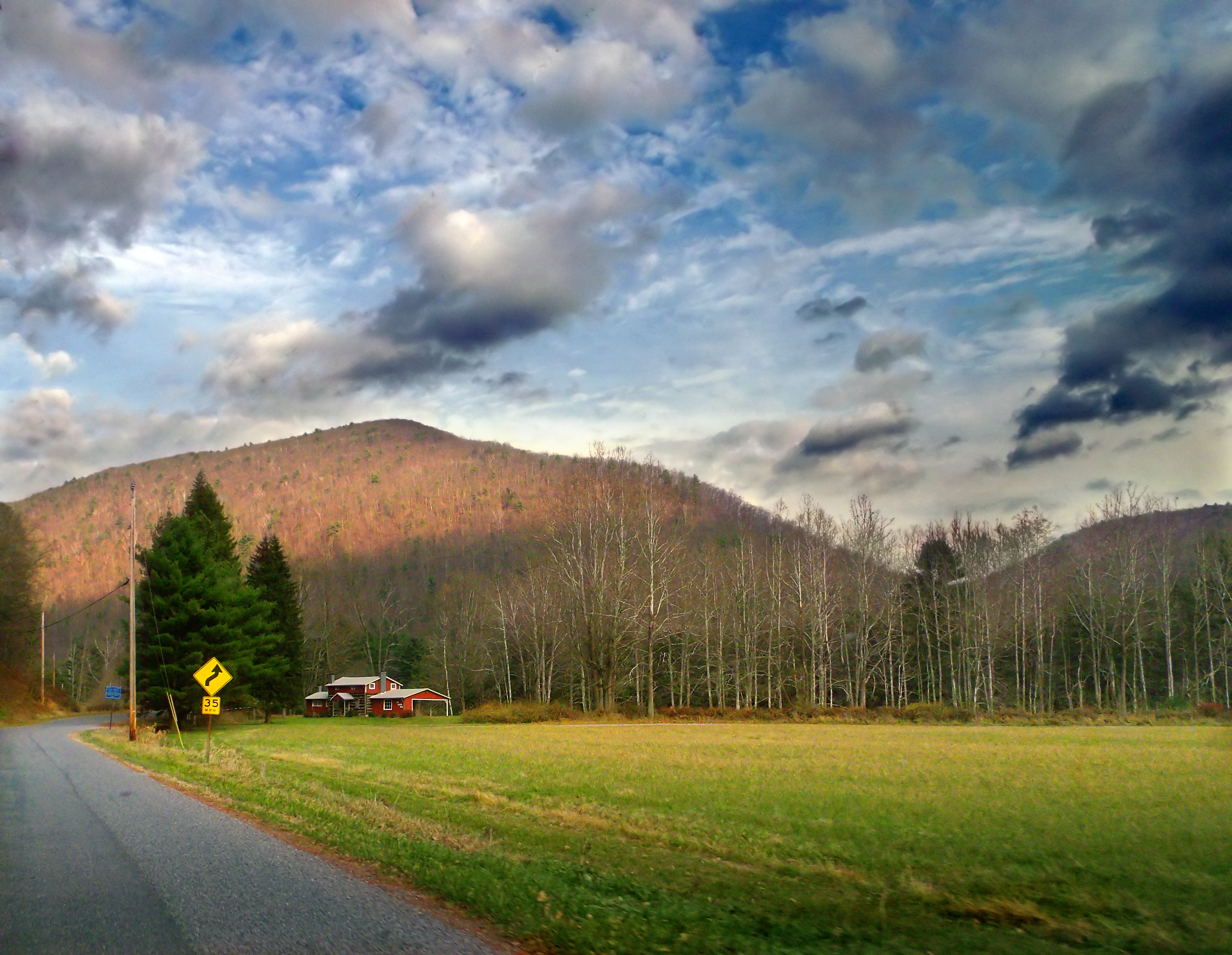
- Along Little Pine Creek in the township

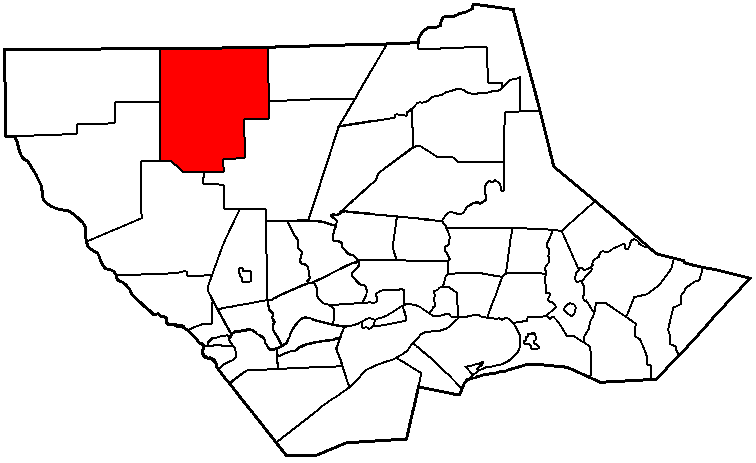
- Map of Lycoming County, Pennsylvania highlighting Pine Township

- Map of Lycoming County, Pennsylvania
- Coordinates: 41°27′50″N 77°17′39″W
- Country: United States
- State: Pennsylvania
- County: Lycoming
- Settled: 1807
- Incorporated: 1857

Area
  - Total: 75.07 sq mi (194.43 km^{2})
  - Land: 74.75 sq mi (193.59 km^{2})
  - Water: 0.33 sq mi (0.85 km^{2})
- Elevation: 1,857 ft (566 m)

Population (2020)
  - Total: 260 ▼
  - Estimate (2021): 258
  - Density: 3.9/sq mi (1.52/km^{2})
- Time zone: UTC-5 (Eastern (EST))
  - Summer (DST): UTC-4 (EDT)
- FIPS code: 42-081-60328
- GNIS feature ID: 1216769
- Website: www.pinetownshiplycomingco.org

Pine Township is a township in Lycoming County, Pennsylvania, United States. The population was 260 at the 2020 census, down from 294 in 2010. It is part of the Williamsport Metropolitan Statistical Area.

== History ==
Pine Township was formed from parts of Brown, Cummings and Cogan House townships on January 27, 1857. It was originally going to be called "Kingston Township", for the Kingston House that was in English Center, but the name was changed to "Pine" in recognition of the vast stands of pine trees that covered much of the township.

The geography and geology of Pine Township have played an important role in its history. Pine Township lies within the southern limits of the most recent ice age. This land was once covered with glaciers. As the glaciers receded they scoured the land creating a moraine, knob-like hills, and kettle holes. Some of these kettles are at the top of the hill. This has caused the unusual formation of a swamp at the top of a hill. The effects of glaciation created soil characteristics that limited successful farming, and the steep hillsides in the township also cut down on the amount of farmable land. Instead, trees have thrived in Pine Township. The old-growth forests were harvested in the mid-to-late 19th century during the lumber era that swept throughout the hills and valleys of Pennsylvania. Massive stands of hemlock and pine were chopped down and floated down Little Pine and Pine creeks to the sawmills of Williamsport. Since the end of the lumbering era, a thriving second growth forest has grown throughout Pine Township.

John Norris and his wife were among the first to settle in Pine Township. They opened a "seminary" or school for girls in the wilderness. During the years it was opened it was one of very few schools in such a remote part of the country to focus on educating teenaged girls.

A failed colony known as "English Settlement" plays a role in the history of northern Lycoming County. The Reverend John Hey, who claimed to be part of the "Independent Church of England", dreamt of acquiring a vast amount of land in the wilderness and establishing a utopia. Hey and some investing partners acquired 110,859 acres (448.63 km^{2}) of land for $21,757 in 1805. Hey next travelled to England to convince his countrymen, mostly from Chard, Somerset, to settle his new colony. Fifteen families agreed to move to Pine Township. When they arrived they did not find the paradise that was described to them by John Hey. What they found was a wilderness of massive trees, rocks and rocky soil. The Englishmen were not prepared for this. They had no experience with clearing any land for farming, and the land that they managed to clear was too rocky for farming. The English Settlement was abandoned ten years after its founding. Those who managed to survive moved to more fertile land in the nearby area.

The villages of Oregon Hill and English Center were founded by survivors of the failed English Settlement. Oregon Hill, at an elevation of 1,700 feet (520 m) in the northern part of the township, was the location of two churches, a blacksmith shop, and two stores along with several homes. The settlers of Oregon Hill were surprised to find that the land in the area was fertile unlike much of the surrounding land. English Center on Little Pine Creek was a milling town.

The English Center Suspension Bridge was added to the National Register of Historic Places in 1978.

== Geography ==
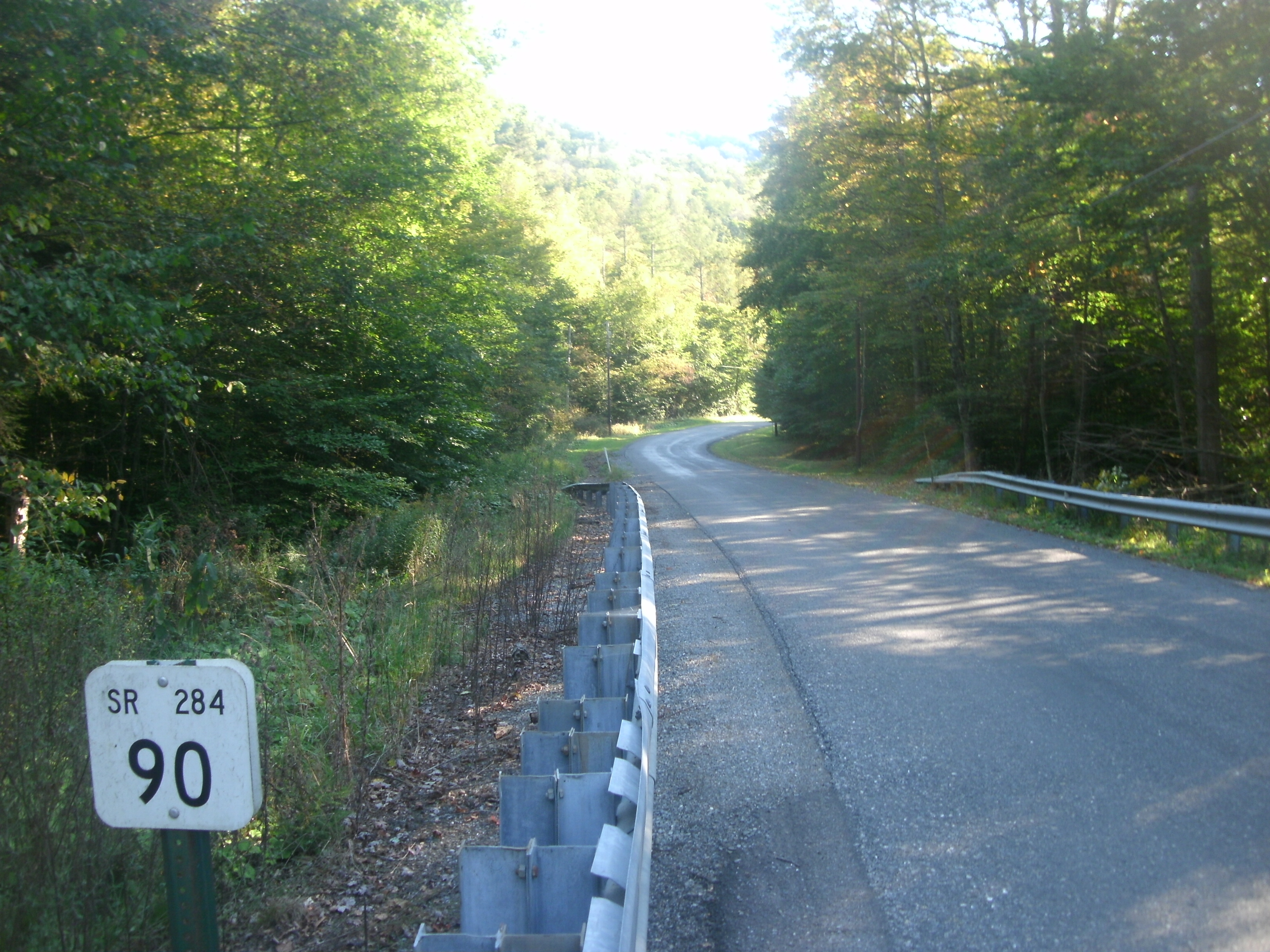
Route 284 heading westbound through Pine Township as a narrow two-lane road

Pine Township is in northern Lycoming County, bordered by Tioga County to the north, Jackson Township to the east, Cogan House Township to the southeast, Cummings Township to the southwest, and McHenry and Brown townships to the west. Pennsylvania Route 287 crosses the township, leading north 23 miles (37 km) to Wellsboro and south 12 miles (19 km) to Salladasburg. Williamsport, the Lycoming county seat, is 29 miles (47 km) to the southeast via PA-287 and U.S. Route 220. Pennsylvania Route 284 begins at PA-287 just north of English Center and leads northeast 8 miles (13 km) to U.S. Route 15, the Appalachian Thruway, at Buttonwood in Jackson Township.

According to the United States Census Bureau, Pine Township has a total area of 75.1 square miles (194.4 km^{2}), of which 74.7 square miles (193.6 km^{2}) are land and 0.3 square miles (0.8 km^{2}), or 0.44%, are water. Little Pine Creek runs through the center of the township, forming a steep-sided valley approximately 1,000 feet (300 m) deep and draining all but the northwest corner of the township. Little Pine Creek begins in the eastern part of the township at the confluence of Texas Creek and Blockhouse Creek and flows southwest through English Center to join Pine Creek in Cummings Township. Streams in the northwestern corner of Pine Township flow directly to Pine Creek.

== Demographics ==
Historical population
Census	Pop.	Note	%±
2010	294		—
2020	260		−11.6%
2021 (est.)	258		−0.8%
U.S. Decennial Census

As of the census of 2000, there were 329 people, 148 households, and 95 families residing in the township. The population density was 4.3 people per square mile (1.7/km^{2}). There were 397 housing units at an average density of 5.2/sq mi (2.0/km^{2}). The racial makeup of the township was 99.09% White and 0.91% Native American. Hispanic or Latino of any race were 0.30% of the population.

There were 148 households, out of which 19.6% had children under the age of 18 living with them, 57.4% were married couples living together, 4.1% had a female householder with no husband present, and 35.8% were non-families. 27.7% of all households were made up of individuals, and 16.9% had someone living alone who was 65 years of age or older. The average household size was 2.22 and the average family size was 2.71.

In the township the population was spread out, with 15.8% under the age of 18, 5.2% from 18 to 24, 25.2% from 25 to 44, 28.6% from 45 to 64, and 25.2% who were 65 years of age or older. The median age was 47 years. For every 100 females there were 112.3 males. For every 100 females age 18 and over, there were 108.3 males.

The median income for a household in the township was $34,886, and the median income for a family was $36,111. Males had a median income of $30,833 versus $18,750 for females. The per capita income for the township was $16,938. About 2.1% of families and 4.0% of the population were below the poverty line, including 7.8% of those under age 18 and none of those age 65 or over.

== Education ==
It is in the Wellsboro Area School District.
