= Salladasburg, Pennsylvania =

Borough in Pennsylvania, US

- Borough
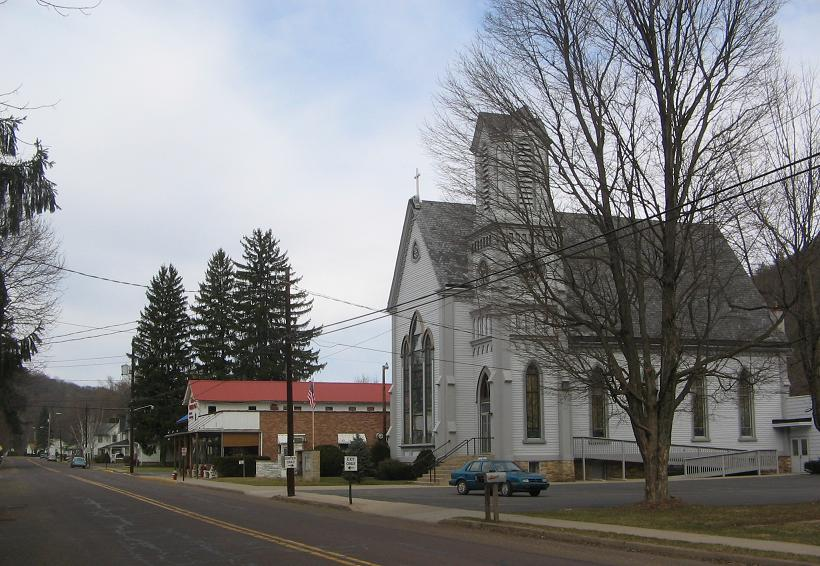
- Salladasburg United Methodist Church and Cohick's Trading Post

- Location of Salladasburg in Lycoming County, Pennsylvania.

- Map of Pennsylvania highlighting Lycoming County
- Coordinates: 41°16′40″N 77°13′33″W
- Country: United States
- State: Pennsylvania
- County: Lycoming
- Settled: 1837
- Incorporated (borough): 1884

Area
  - Total: 0.79 sq mi (2.05 km^{2})
  - Land: 0.78 sq mi (2.01 km^{2})
  - Water: 0.012 sq mi (0.03 km^{2})
- Elevation: 653 ft (199 m)

Population (2020)
  - Total: 254 ▲
  - Estimate (2021): 252
  - Density: 289.4/sq mi (111.75/km^{2})
- Time zone: UTC-5 (Eastern Time Zone (North America))
  - Summer (DST): UTC-4 (EDT)
- ZIP code: 17740
- Area code: 570
- FIPS code: 42-67616
- GNIS feature ID: 1186873

Salladasburg is a borough in Lycoming County, Pennsylvania, United States. The population was 252 at the 2020 census, making it the smallest borough in Lycoming County. It is part of the Williamsport, Pennsylvania Metropolitan Statistical Area.

Salladasburg is located on Larrys Creek, at the confluence of the Second Fork of Larrys Creek. It is also located at the intersection of Pennsylvania Route 287 and Pennsylvania Route 973.

== History ==
Salladasburg was laid out by Jacob P. Sallada in 1837. He started the town with lots for homes and built a church for use by Lutherans and Presbyterians only. The population of Salladasburg was 374 as of the 1890 census and is now set at just 238 residents. Since 2013, the official princess of Salladasburg has been Kathleen Sallada. The borough had a number of stores and shops, one hotel, a gristmill, and tannery. There were two schools and three churches. Salladasburg was incorporated as a borough by the Court of Quarter Sessions of the Peace of Lycoming County, Pennsylvania on January 12, 1884.

== Geography ==
Salladasburg is located at 41°16′40″N 77°13′33″W (41.277733, -77.225907). It is surrounded by Mifflin Township. As the crow flies, Lycoming County is approximately 130 miles (209 km) northwest of Philadelphia and 165 miles (266 km) east-northeast of Pittsburgh.

According to the United States Census Bureau, the borough has a total area of 0.8 square miles (2.1 km^{2}), all land.

== Demographics ==
Historical population
Census	Pop.	Note	%±
1880	312		—
1890	374		19.9%
1900	261		−30.2%
1910	280		7.3%
1920	208		−25.7%
1930	227		9.1%
1940	237		4.4%
1950	250		5.5%
1960	255		2.0%
1970	239		−6.3%
1980	273		14.2%
1990	301		10.3%
2000	260		−13.6%
2010	238		−8.5%
2020	250		5.0%
2021 (est.)	252	▲	0.8%

As of the census of 2000, there were 260 people, 105 households, and 70 families residing in the borough. The population density was 333.7 inhabitants per square mile (128.8/km^{2}). There were 113 housing units at an average density of 145.0 per square mile (56.0/km^{2}). The racial makeup of the borough was 99.23% White, and 0.77% from two or more races.

There were 105 households, out of which 30.5% had children under the age of 18 living with them, 48.6% were married couples living together, 13.3% had a female householder with no husband present, and 33.3% were non-families. 25.7% of all households were made up of individuals, and 7.6% had someone living alone who was 65 years of age or older. The average household size was 2.48 and the average family size was 2.99.

In the borough the population was spread out, with 27.7% under the age of 18, 7.7% from 18 to 24, 28.1% from 25 to 44, 21.9% from 45 to 64, and 14.6% who were 65 years of age or older. The median age was 36 years. For every 100 females there were 92.6 males. For every 100 females age 18 and over, there were 93.8 males.

The median income for a household in the borough was $30,000, and the median income for a family was $32,500. Males had a median income of $26,458 versus $28,125 for females. The per capita income for the borough was $16,122. About 11.8% of families and 14.9% of the population were below the poverty line, including 21.4% of those under the age of eighteen and 9.5% of those sixty five or over.

== See also ==
History of Lycoming County, Pennsylvania
