= List of tributaries of Larrys Creek =

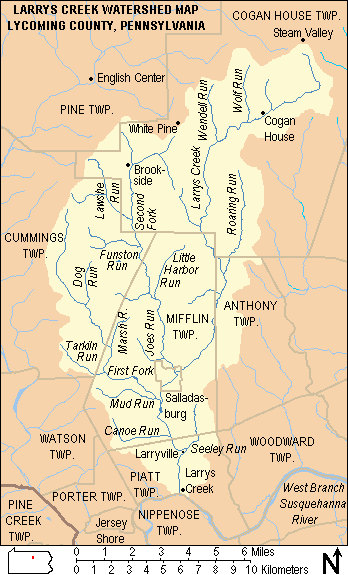
Map of the Larrys Creek watershed, showing inhabited places and major tributaries

There are 42 named tributaries of Larrys Creek, which is a 22.9 mile (36.9 km) long stream in Lycoming County in the U.S. state of Pennsylvania. Larrys Creek is a tributary of the West Branch Susquehanna River and part of the Chesapeake Bay drainage basin; its watershed drains 89.1 square miles (231 km^{2}) in six townships and a borough. Despite being clear-cut in the 19th century, as of 2008 the Larrys Creek watershed is 83.1% forest and 15.7% agricultural.

The named tributaries within the watershed are presented here in three lists. Larrys Creek itself has 18 named tributaries, which are the subject of the first list. The First Fork and Second Fork of Larrys Creek are the two main tributaries of Larrys Creek, and they have multiple tributaries of their own. The second list gives the First Fork's eight named tributaries, and the third list gives the Second Fork's nine named tributaries. Finally there are seven named streams in the watershed which are tributaries of tributaries of the three main branches, and they are presented after each list. There is one such stream for Larrys Creek itself, two for the First Fork, and four for the Second Fork. There are also tributaries without names, which are not included in these lists.

Each list follows the same format. The first column gives the name—27 of the tributaries are named streams, while the remaining 15 are unnamed streams in named valleys: i.e. 13 hollows, one cove, and one swale. Tributaries which are themselves unnamed, but which are in a named valley are given the name of the feature in quotation marks, for example: "Pond Hollow". The first column also notes whether the tributary enters its parent stream on the right bank or left bank. The second column in each list gives the river miles, which is the distance from the mouth of the tributary to the mouth of its parent stream (Larrys Creek or the First or Second Fork). The third column gives the area of the drainage basin or watershed for that stream. The next four columns give the latitude and longitude and the elevation of the mouth and source of each tributary, and the final column has remarks, mostly about location.

== Tributaries ==
Larrys Creek flows south from the dissected Allegheny Plateau to the Ridge-and-valley Appalachians. It rises in Cogan House Township and flows south to Green Mountain. There it turns southwest and flows under the Cogan House Covered Bridge, which is on the National Register of Historic Places and one of only three remaining covered bridges in Lycoming County. At Buckhorn Mountain it turns south through Pennsylvania State Game Lands (SGL) No. 114 and flows through Mifflin and Anthony Townships, passing between Coal Mountain and Harris Point. From Mifflin Township it enters the borough of Salladasburg, where it receives the Second Fork, and just south of the borough the First Fork joins the creek. These two largest tributaries drain parts of Pine, Cogan House, Cummings, and Mifflin Townships (there are named streams in the Larrys Creek watershed in all but Pine Township). Piatt Township is the last municipality the creek flows through and it enters the West Branch Susquehanna River there.

The five largest direct tributaries in the Larrys Creek watershed are the First and Second Forks of Larrys Creek, Roaring Run, Wendell Run and Wolf Run. The Second Fork of Larrys Creek is the largest tributary, with a watershed of 24.9 square miles (64 km^{2}) or 28.0% of the total watershed. The First Fork is next largest, with a watershed of 17.6 square miles (46 km^{2}) or 19.8% of the total. Roaring Run accounts for 5.7% of the total watershed (5.1 square miles or 13.2 km^{2}) and other tributaries are less than 5% of the total area.

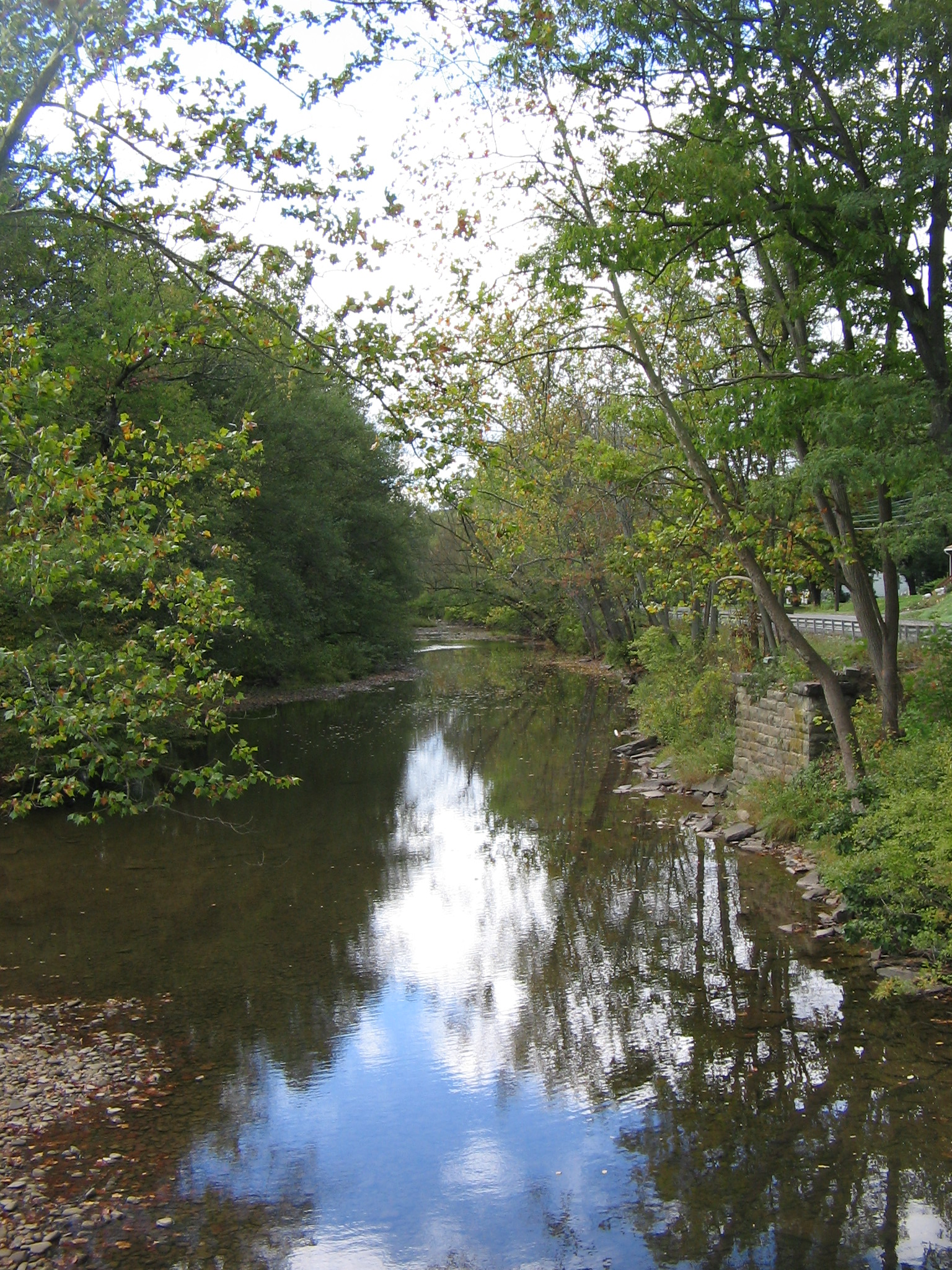
Larrys Creek in
Piatt Township

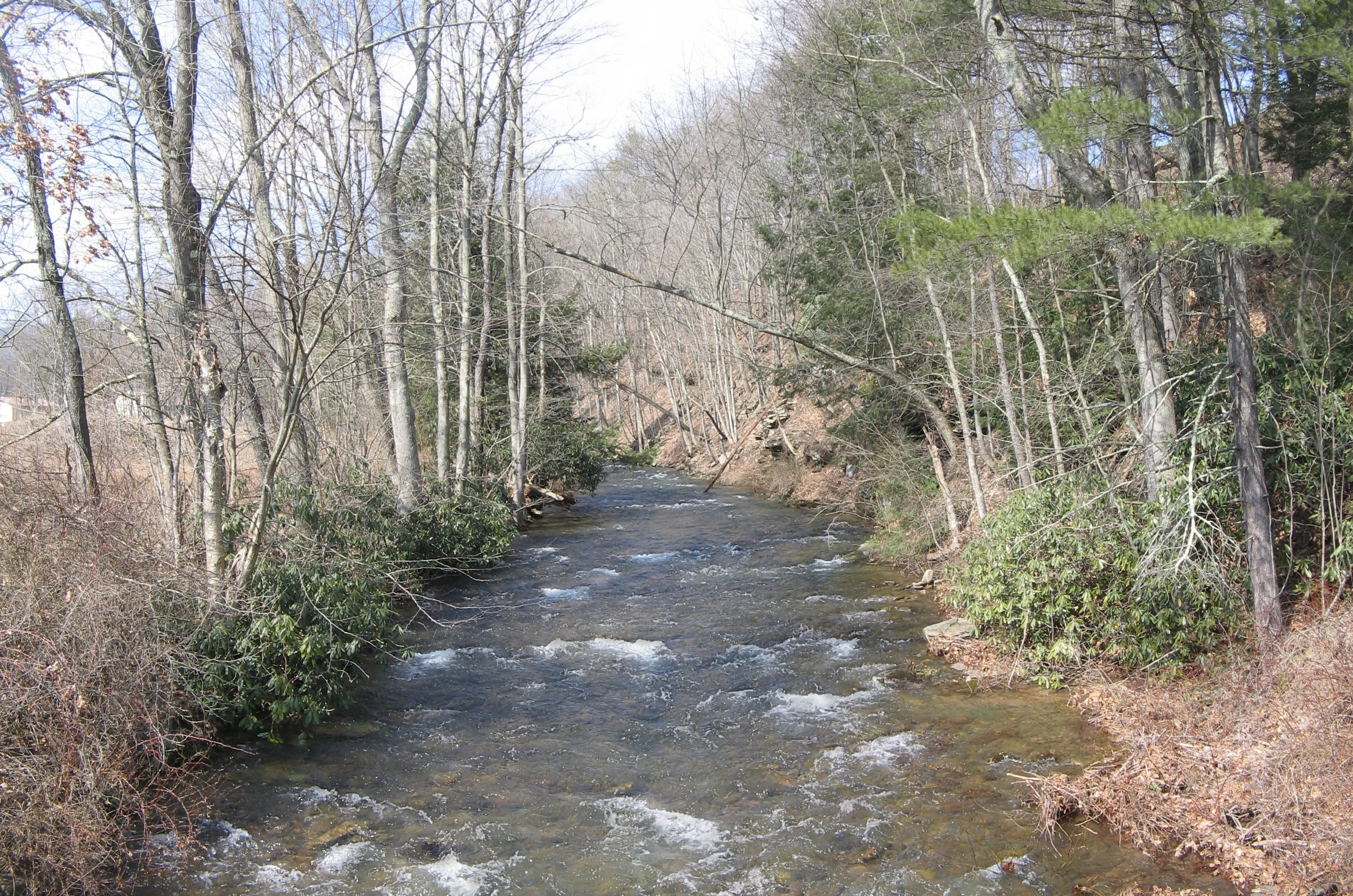
First Fork
Larrys Creek

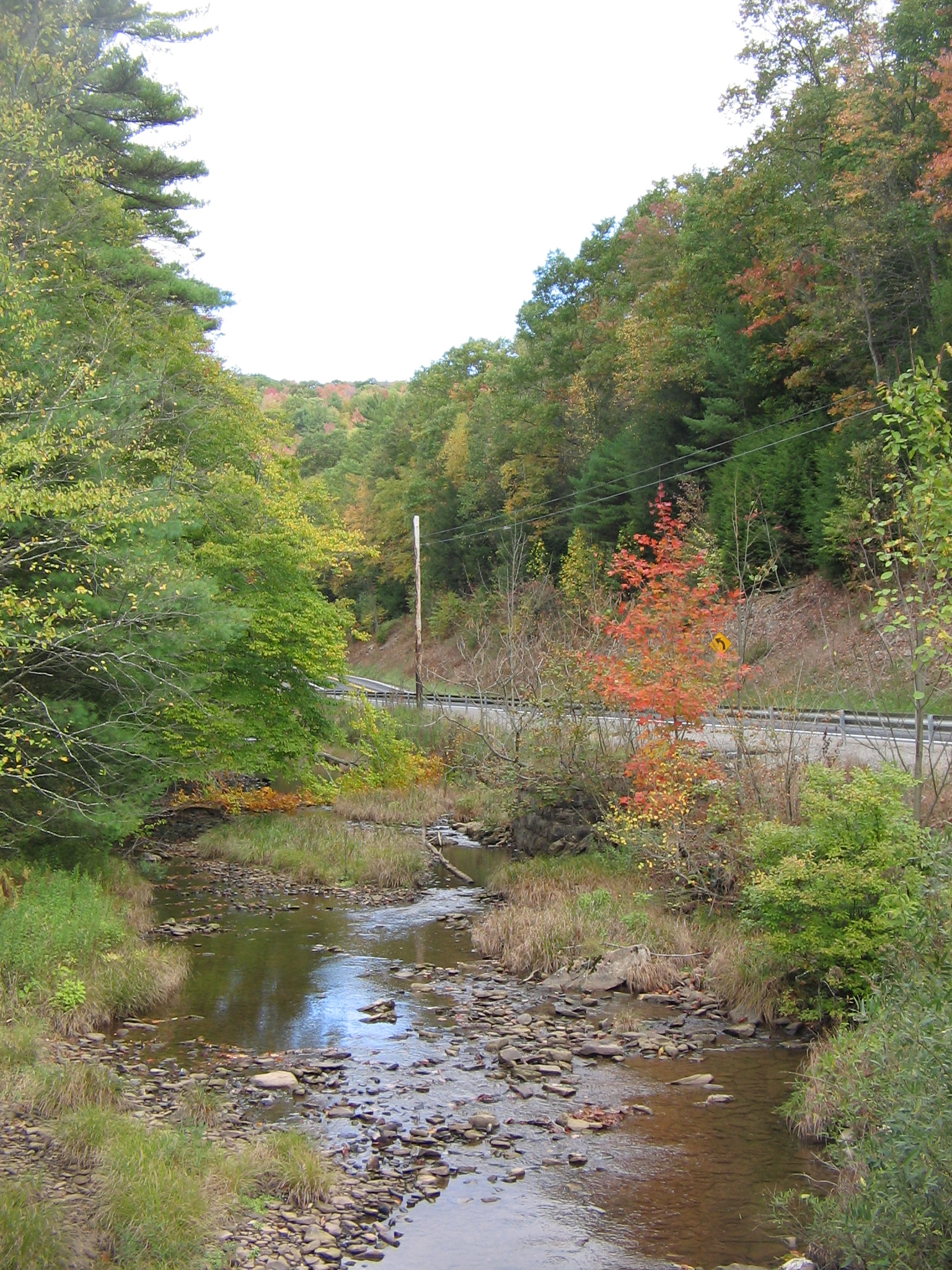
Second Fork
Larrys Creek

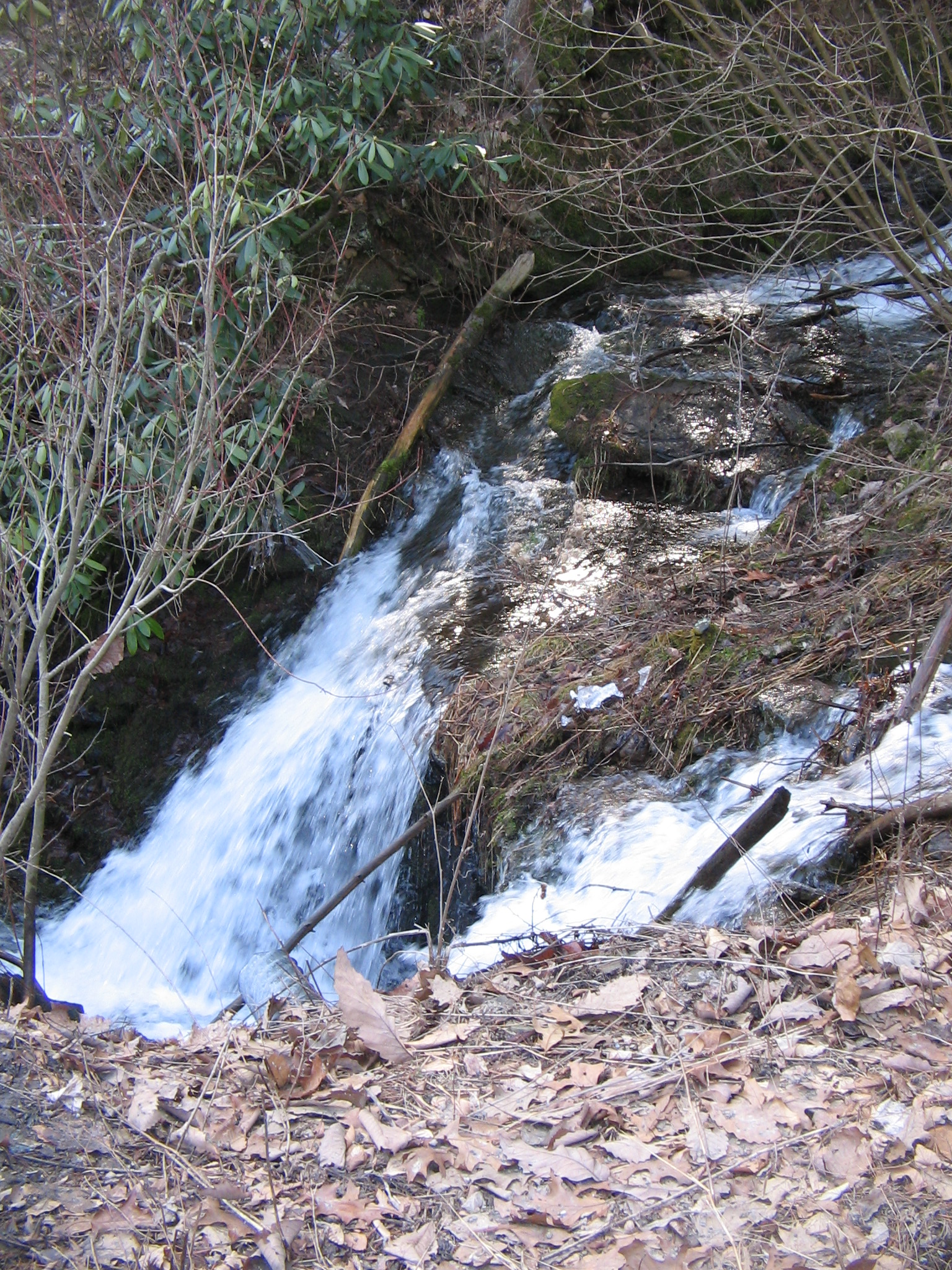
Waterfall in
Kline Hollow

=== Main stem tributaries ===
Named tributaries of the main stem of Larrys Creek
Name, bank	River miles (km)	Watershed area in square miles (km^{2})	Mouth coordinates	Mouth elevation in feet (m)	Source coordinates	Source elevation in feet (m)	Remarks
Mouth	0 mi (0 km)	89.1 mi^{2} (230.8 km^{2})	41°13′00″N 77°13′13″W	515 ft (157 m)	--	--	Larrys Creek enters the West Branch Susquehanna River in Piatt Township at the hamlet of Larrys Creek.
Seeley Run, left bank	1.82 mi (2.93 km)	1.46 mi^{2} (3.78 km^{2})	41°14′26″N 77°12′56″W	554 ft (169 m)	41°15′56″N 77°12′23″W	1005 feet (306 m)	Mouth at the village of Larryville in Piatt Township, source in Mifflin Township
Canoe Run, right bank	2.82 mi (4.54 km)	2.11 mi^{2} (5.46 km^{2})	41°14′50″N 77°13′35″W	577 ft (176 m)	41°15′21″N 77°15′57″W	928 feet (283 m)	Entirely within Piatt Township
First Fork Larrys Creek,^{[a]} right bank	4.20 mi (6.76 km)	17.60 mi^{2} (45.58 km^{2})	41°15′54″N 77°13′57″W	617 ft (188 m)	41°22′14″N 77°17′45″W	2,040 feet (622 m)	Mouth just south of Salladasburg in Piatt Township, source in Cummings Township
Second Fork Larrys Creek,^{[b]} right bank	5.76 mi (9.27 km)	24.90 mi^{2} (64.49 km^{2})	41°16′53″N 77°13′24″W	666 ft (203 m)	41°24′34″N 77°13′19″W	1,670 feet (509 m)	Mouth in Salladasburg, source in Cogan House Township near the village of White Pine
Mash Run, right bank	9.54 mi (15.35 km)	1.19 mi^{2} (3.08 km^{2})	41°19′21″N 77°11′28″W	873 ft (266 m)	41°19′03″N 77°12′56″W	1,635 feet (498 m)	Mouth in Anthony Township, source in Mifflin Township, just north of Harris Point
"Pond Hollow", left bank	9.90 mi (15.93 km)	0.40 mi^{2} (1.04 km^{2})	41°19′40″N 77°11′15″W	919 ft (260 m)	41°20′08″N 77°10′35″W	1,690 feet (515 m)	Entirely in Anthony Township, on the west side of Coal Mountain
"Spook Hollow", right bank	10.38 mi (16.70 km)	0.77 mi^{2} (1.99 km^{2})	41°19′57″N 77°11′26″W	935 ft (285 m)	41°20′24″N 77°12′47″W	1,640 feet (500 m)	Mouth in Anthony Township, source in Mifflin Township in SGL No. 114
Roaring Run, left bank	10.40 mi (16.74 km)	5.11 mi^{2} (13.23 km^{2})	41°20′01″N 77°11′22″W	937 ft (286 m)	41°23′27″N 77°10′43″W	1,795 feet (547 m)	Mouth in Anthony Township, source in Cogan House Township, on the west side of Coal Mountain
"Cramer Hollow", right bank	11.28 mi (18.15 km)	0.37 mi^{2} (0.96 km^{2})	41°20′37″N 77°11′47″W	984 ft (300 m)	41°20′32″N 77°12′55″W	1,605 feet (489 m)	Mouth in Anthony Township, source in Mifflin Township in SGL No. 114
"Pot Lick Hollow", left bank	11.56 mi (18.60 km)	0.41 mi^{2} (1.06 km^{2})	41°20′51″N 77°11′49″W	1,027 ft (313 m)	41°21′29″N 77°11′05″W	1,700 feet (518 m)	Mouth in Mifflin Township, source in Cogan House Township, entirely in SGL No. 114, on the west side of Coal Mountain
"Match Pine Hollow", right bank	11.99 mi (19.30 km)	0.22 mi^{2} (0.57 km^{2})	41°21′05″N 77°12′08″W	1,033 ft (315 m)	41°21′19″N 77°12′55″W	1,680 feet (514 m)	Entirely in Mifflin Township, mouth in SGL No. 114, on the west side of Coal Mountain
"Watt Hollow", left bank	12.34 mi (19.86 km)	0.40 mi^{2} (1.04 km^{2})	41°21′22″N 77°12′13″W	1,083 ft (330 m)	41°22′08″N 77°11′31″W	1,770 feet (539 m)	Mouth at the border of Mifflin and Cogan House Townships, source in Cogan House Township, mouth in SGL No. 114
Long Run, right bank	12.58 mi (20.25 km)	1.85 mi^{2} (4.79 km^{2})	41°21′33″N 77°12′20″W	1,122 ft (342 m)	41°22′51″N 77°13′02″W	1,885 feet (575 m)	Entirely in Cogan House Township
Wendell Run,^{[c]} right bank	16.20 mi (26.07 km)	2.89 mi^{2} (7.49 km^{2})	41°24′14″N 77°11′40″W	1,283 ft (391 m)	41°26′13″N 77°11′47″W	1,525 feet (465 m)	Entirely in Cogan House Township, mouth just upstream of Cogan House Covered Bridge
Crayton Hollow Run, left bank	16.88 mi (27.17 km)	0.38 mi^{2} (0.98 km^{2})	41°24′37″N 77°11′14″W	1,322 ft (403 m)	41°24′02″N 77°10′40″W	1,780 feet (543 m)	Entirely in Cogan House Township, on the north side of Buckhorn Mountain
Wolf Run, right bank	17.96 mi (28.90 km)	2.22 mi^{2} (5.75 km^{2})	41°24′52″N 77°10′24″W	1,352 ft (412 m)	41°27′07″N 77°10′36″W	1,635 feet (498 m)	Entirely in Cogan House Township
Dibber Hollow Run, left bank	18.42 mi (29.64 km)	0.33 mi^{2} (0.85 km^{2})	41°24′59″N 77°10′01″W	1,358 ft (414 m)	41°24′24″N 77°09′43″W	1,740 feet (530 m)	Entirely in Cogan House Township, on the north side of Green and Buckhorn Mountains, with the mouth just downstream of village of Cogan House
Birch Run, left bank	19.15 mi (30.82 km)	0.74 mi^{2} (1.92 km^{2})	41°25′16″N 77°09′15″W	1,394 ft (425 m)	41°24′18″N 77°09′04″W	1,770 feet (539 m)	Entirely in Cogan House Township, on the north side of Green Mountain with the mouth just upstream of the village of Cogan House
Source	22.9 mi (36.9 km)	0 mi^{2} (0 km^{2})	--	--	41°27′13″N 77°08′12″W	1,740 ft (530 m)	The source of Larrys Creek is in Cogan House Township, just south of the hamlet of Steam Valley.

Wendell Run, itself a tributary of Larrys Creek, has one named tributary: Buck Run.

Named tributary of Wendell Run
Name, bank	River miles (km)	Watershed area in square miles (km^{2})	Mouth coordinates	Mouth elevation in feet (m)	Source coordinates	Source elevation in feet (m)	Remarks
Buck Run, left bank (of Wendell Run)	1.40 mi (2.25 km)	0.45 mi^{2} (1.17 km^{2})	41°25′26″N 77°11′55″W	1,411 ft (430 m)	41°25′55″N 77°11′12″W	1600 feet (488 m)	Entirely in Cogan House Township

=== First Fork tributaries ===
The First Fork is the second largest tributary and has its source in Cummings Township. It flows south-southeast passing to the southwest of Little Round Top and Puterbaugh Mountain, then leaves the dissected Allegheny Plateau at Fishery Point. It then enters Mifflin Township, where it joins Larrys Creek just south of Salladasburg, 4.2 miles (6.8 km) from the mouth. Historically, much of the First Fork was protected as part of the Ogontz Lodge, a private hunting and fishing club.

The four largest tributaries of the First Fork are: Tarkiln Run with a watershed of 2.71 square miles (7.0 km^{2}) or 15.4% of the First Fork watershed; Mud Run with 2.22 square miles (5.75 km^{2} or 12.6%); Dog Run with 1.82 square miles (4.71 km^{2} or 10.3%); and Marsh Run with 0.96 square miles (2.49 km^{2} or 5.5%). All other tributaries are less than 5% of the total area.

Named tributaries of the First Fork of Larrys Creek
Name, bank	River miles (km)	Watershed area in square miles (km^{2})	Mouth coordinates	Mouth elevation in feet (m)	Source coordinates	Source elevation in feet (m)	Remarks
Mouth	0 mi (0 km)	17.60 mi^{2} (45.58 km^{2})	41°15′54″N 77°13′57″W	617 ft (188 m)	--	--	The First Fork enters Larrys Creek just south of Salladasburg in Piatt Township.
Mud Run, right bank	0.32 mi (0.51 km)	2.22 mi^{2} (5.75 km^{2})	41°16′01″N 77°14′12″W	643 ft (196 m)	41°16′22″N 77°16′47″W	1,000 feet (305 m)	Entirely in Mifflin Township
Tarkiln Run,^{[c]} right bank	2.82 mi (4.54 km)	2.71 mi^{2} (7.02 km^{2})	41°16′52″N 77°16′20″W	827 ft (252 m)	41°18′12″N 77°18′26″W	1,785 feet (544 m)	Mouth in Mifflin Township, source in Cummings Township, starts on the west side of Fishery Point
Marsh Run, left bank	3.88 mi (6.24 km)	0.96 mi^{2} (2.49 km^{2})	41°17′41″N 77°16′03″W	948 ft (289 m)	41°18′38″N 77°15′40″W	1,775 feet (541 m)	Entirely in Mifflin Township, on the west side of Puterbaugh Mountain
Buckhorn Run, left bank	4.80 mi (7.72 km)	0.80 mi^{2} (2.07 km^{2})	41°18′17″N 77°16′33″W	1,066 ft (325 m)	41°19′13″N 77°16′08″W	1,635 feet (498 m)	Entirely in Cummings Township, on the west side of Puterbaugh Mountain
"Pond Lick Cove", right bank	5.16 mi (8.30 km)	0.21 mi^{2} (0.54 km^{2})	41°18′27″N 77°16′50″W	1,119 ft (341 m)	41°18′36″N 77°17′43″W	1,810 feet (552 m)	Entirely in Cummings Township
Dog Run,^{[c]} left bank	5.88 mi (9.46 km)	1.82 mi^{2} (4.71 km^{2})	41°19′00″N 77°17′07″W	1,220 ft (372 m)	41°20′34″N 77°16′47″W	1,675 feet (511 m)	Entirely in Cummings Township, on the west side of Puterbaugh Mountain
"Hickory Swale", right bank	6.30 mi (10.14 km)	0.45 mi^{2} (1.17 km^{2})	41°19′08″N 77°17′32″W	1,309 ft (399 m)	41°18′58″N 77°18′35″W	1,925 feet (587 m)	Entirely in Cummings Township
"Jacobs Hollow", left bank	7.00 mi (11.27 km)	0.34 mi^{2} (0.88 km^{2})	41°19′40″N 77°17′57″W	1,430 ft (436 m)	41°20′07″N 77°17′28″W	1,760 feet (536 m)	Entirely in Cummings Township, just south of Little Round Top
Source	c. 10.4 mi (16.7 km)	0 mi^{2} (0 km^{2})	--	--	41°22′14″N 77°17′45″W	2,040 feet (622 m)	The source of the First Fork is in Cummings Township, north of Cummings Spring and Little Round Top.

There are two named tributaries of the First Fork which have their own named tributary: Tarkiln Run has Ritter Run; and Dog Run has Little Dog Run.

Named tributaries of named tributaries of the main stem of Larrys Creek
Name, bank	River miles (km)	Watershed area in square miles (km^{2})	Mouth coordinates	Mouth elevation in feet (m)	Source coordinates	Source elevation in feet (m)	Remarks
Ritter Run, right bank (of Tarkiln Run)	0.74 mi (1.19 km)	1.17 mi^{2} (3.03 km^{2})	41°16′59″N 77°17′02″W	984 ft (300 m)	41°17′53″N 77°18′19″W	1700 feet (518 m)	Entirely in Cummings Township
Little Dog Run, left bank (of Dog Run)	0.28 mi (0.45 km)	0.63 mi^{2} (1.63 km^{2})	41°19′12″N 77°16′57″W	1,293 ft (394 m)	41°19′57″N 77°16′23″W	1810 feet (552 m)	Entirely in Cummings Township, on the west side of Puterbaugh Mountain

=== Second Fork tributaries ===
The Second Fork is the largest tributary and rises in Cogan House Township near the village of White Pine. It runs south through the village of Brookside, then along the east side of Henson Ridge and Puterbaugh Mountain through Cummings and Mifflin Townships. It leaves the dissected Allegheny Plateau at Clapp Point and ends in Salladasburg, where it joins Larrys Creek 5.8 miles (9.3 km) from the mouth. In 1851 a plank road was built from the mouth along Larrys Creek to Salladasburg, then followed the Second Fork as far as the village of English Centre in Pine Township. There was also a spur along the First Fork into Anthony Township and perhaps further. An 1889 flood destroyed much of the plank road, and it ceased operation as a toll road in 1900. Today Pennsylvania Route 287 follows its course along the entire length of the Second Fork. Over 6,000 acres (2,400 ha) along it belongs to the private "Larrys Creek Fish and Game Club".

The three largest tributaries of the Second Fork are: Lawshe Run with a watershed of 3.39 square miles (8.8 km^{2}) or 13.6% of the Second Fork watershed; Funston Run with 2.50 square miles (6.48 km^{2} or 10.0%); and Little Harbor Run with 2.14 square miles (5.54 km^{2} or 8.6%). All other tributaries are less than 5% of the total area.

Named tributaries of the Second Fork of Larrys Creek
Name, bank	River miles (km)	Watershed area in square miles (km^{2})	Mouth coordinates	Mouth elevation in feet (m)	Source coordinates	Source elevation in feet (m)	Remarks
Second Fork Larrys Creek, right bank	5.76 mi (9.27 km)	24.90 mi^{2} (64.49 km^{2})	41°16′53″N 77°13′24″W	666 ft (203 m)	--	--	The Second Fork enters Larrys Creek in the borough of Salladasburg.
Joes Run, right bank	0.68 mi (1.09 km)	0.86 mi^{2} (2.23 km^{2})	41°17′18″N 77°13′49″W	702 ft (214 m)	41°18′00″N 77°14′59″W	1,480 feet (451 m)	Entirely in Mifflin Township, mouth is just north of Salladasburg, starts on the south side of Puterbaugh Mountain
"Kline Hollow", right bank	2.54 mi (4.09 km)	0.55 mi^{2} (1.42 km^{2})	41°18′46″N 77°14′06″W	830 ft (253 m)	41°18′51″N 77°14′58″W	1,600 feet (488 m)	Entirely in Mifflin Township, on the east side of Puterbaugh Mountain
Little Harbor Run,^{[c]} left bank	3.22 mi (5.18 km)	2.14 mi^{2} (5.54 km^{2})	41°19′13″N 77°14′12″W	873 ft (266 m)	41°21′00″N 77°13′02″W	1,500 feet (457 m)	Entirely in Mifflin Township, north of Clapp Point
Harbor Run, right bank	3.54 mi (5.70 km)	0.60 mi^{2} (1.55 km^{2})	41°19′24″N 77°14′27″W	896 ft (273 m)	41°19′20″N 77°15′59″W	1,645 feet (501 m)	Mouth in Mifflin Township, source in Cummings Township, on the east side of Puterbaugh Mountain
"De France Hollow", left bank	5.42 mi (8.72 km)	0.76 mi^{2} (1.97 km^{2})	41°20′53″N 77°14′49″W	1,050 ft (320 m)	41°21′30″N 77°13′36″W	1,685 feet (514 m)	Mouth in Cummings Township, part in Mifflin Township, source in Cogan House Township
Funston Run,^{[c]} right bank	5.52 mi (8.88 km)	2.50 mi^{2} (6.48 km^{2})	41°20′55″N 77°14′54″W	1,053 ft (321 m)	41°21′05″N 77°15′37″W	1,184 feet (361 m)	Entirely in Cummings Township, north of Henson Ridge; a variant name is Francis Run
"Cold Spring Hollow", left bank	5.94 mi (9.56 km)	0.67 mi^{2} (1.74 km^{2})	41°21′14″N 77°15′02″W	1,099 ft (335 m)	41°21′48″N 77°13′52″W	1,680 feet (512 m)	Mouth in Cummings Township, source in Cogan House Township
Lawshe Run,^{[c]} right bank	6.58 mi (10.59 km)	3.39 mi^{2} (8.78 km^{2})	41°21′43″N 77°15′10″W	1,112 ft (339 m)	41°23′38″N 77°17′09″W	1,675 feet (511 m)	Mouth and source in Cogan House Township, part in Cummings Township
"Thompson Hollow", left bank	7.04 mi (11.33 km)	0.55 mi^{2} (1.42 km^{2})	41°22′07″N 77°15′11″W	1,178 ft (359 m)	41°22′04″N 77°14′07″W	1,795 feet (547 m)	Entirely in Cogan House Township
Source	c. 11.1 mi (17.9 km)	0 mi^{2} (0 km^{2})	--	--	41°24′34″N 77°13′19″W	1,670 feet (509 m)	The source of the Second Fork is in Cogan House Township south of the village of White Pine.

There are four named tributaries of the Second Fork which have their own named tributaries: Funston Run is formed by the confluence of Right Fork Funston Run with Left Fork Funston Run; Little Harbor Run has "Little Sandy Hollow"; and Lawshe Run has "Bear Hollow".

Named tributaries of named tributaries of the Second Fork of Larrys Creek
Name, bank	River miles (km)	Watershed area in square miles (km^{2})	Mouth coordinates	Mouth elevation in feet (m)	Source coordinates	Source elevation in feet (m)	Remarks
Right Fork Funston Run, right bank	0.72 mi (1.16 km)	1.00 mi^{2} (2.59 km^{2})	41°21′05″N 77°15′37″W	1,184 ft (361 m)	41°22′01″N 77°16′52″W	1910 feet (582 m)	Entirely in Cummings Township, north of Henson Ridge
Left Fork Funston Run, left bank	0.72 mi (1.16 km)	1.06 mi^{2} (2.75 km^{2})	41°21′05″N 77°15′37″W	1,184 ft (361 m)	41°21′43″N 77°17′13″W	1905 feet (581 m)	Entirely in Cummings Township, north of Henson Ridge
"Little Sandy Hollow", left bank (of Little Harbor Run)	0.06 mi (0.10 km)	0.66 mi^{2} (1.71 km^{2})	41°19′18″N 77°14′12″W	915 ft (279 m)	41°20′09″N 77°12′48″W	1,610 feet (491 m)	Entirely in Mifflin Township, source in Pennsylvania State Game Lands (SGL) No. 114, north of Clapp Point
"Bear Hollow", left bank (of Lawshe Run)	1.42 mi (2.29 km)	1.27 mi^{2} (3.29 km^{2})	41°22′33″N 77°16′16″W	1,296 ft (395 m)	41°22′45″N 77°17′47″W	2100 feet (640 m)	Entirely in Cogan House Township

== See also ==
- List of rivers of Pennsylvania

== Notes ==
a. The First Fork of Larrys Creek has eight named tributaries and is the subject of the second list.
b. The Second Fork of Larrys Creek has nine named tributaries and is the subject of the third list.
c. This stream has at least one named tributary of its own. See the small table directly after this list for details.
