= Anthony Township, Pennsylvania =

Anthony Township may refer to:

- Anthony Township, Lycoming County, Pennsylvania
- Anthony Township, Montour County, Pennsylvania
