= Cogan House Covered Bridge =

Covered bridge in Pennsylvania, US

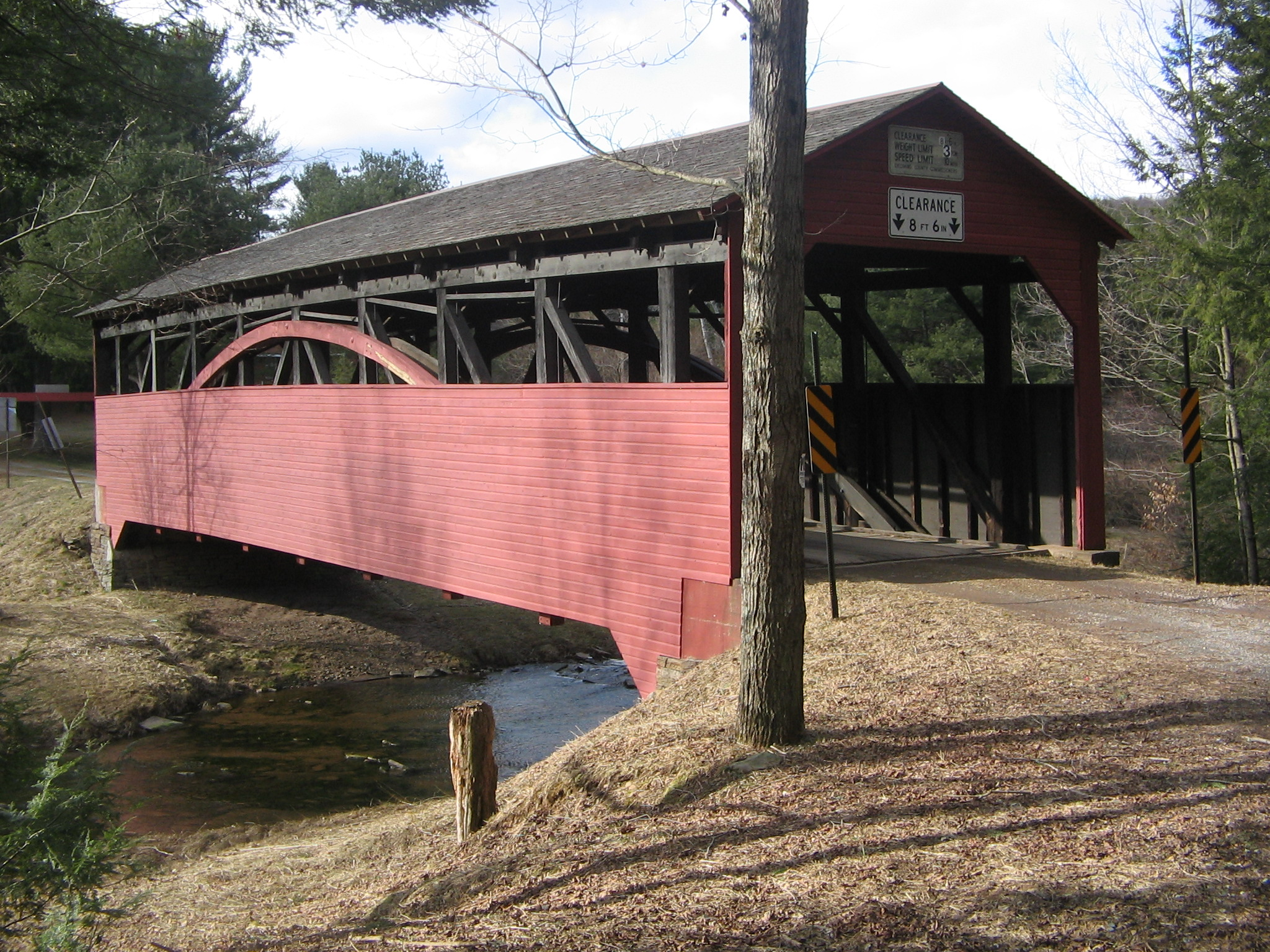
- Coordinates: 41°23′54″N 77°12′03″W
- Carries: Township 784
- Crosses: Larrys Creek
- Locale: Lycoming, Pennsylvania, United States
- Official name: Cogan House Covered Bridge
- Other name: Buckhorn
- Named for: Cogan House Township
- Maintained by: Lycoming County
- NBI Number: 417208078401120

Characteristics
- Design: National Register of Historic Places
- Total length: 94.2 ft (28.7 m)
- Width: 19.6 ft (6.0 m)
- Height: 8.5 ft (2.6 m)
- Load limit: 3 tons (2.7 t)

History
- Constructed by: Valentine Meyers (or Meyer)
- Built: 1877
- Cogan House Covered Bridge
- U.S. National Register of Historic Places
- MPS: Covered Bridges of Bradford, Sullivan and Lycoming Counties TR
- NRHP reference No.: 80003567
- Added to NRHP: July 24, 1980

Location
- Interactive map of Cogan House Covered Bridge

The Cogan House Covered Bridge is a Burr arch truss covered bridge over Larrys Creek in Cogan House Township, Lycoming County, Pennsylvania, United States. It was built in 1877 and is 94 feet 2 inches (28.7 m) long. The bridge was placed on the National Register of Historic Places in 1980 and underwent a major restoration in 1998. The Cogan House bridge is named for the township and village of Cogan House, and is also known by at least four other names: Buckhorn, Larrys Creek, Day's, and Plankenhorn.

The Cogan House Covered Bridge was constructed by a millwright who assembled the timber framework in a field next to the sawmill, before it was reassembled at the bridge site. It was the only bridge on Larrys Creek that survived the flood of June 1889, and one of only a handful that were left intact in the county. Although the bridge used to carry a steady flow of tannery and sawmill traffic, the clearcutting of the surrounding forests meant the end of those industries by the early 20th century.

Since then much of the surrounding area has reverted to second growth forest, and the one-lane bridge is now on a dead end road in a remote valley with little traffic. It is the oldest and longest of the three covered bridges remaining in the county. Despite the 1998 restoration and other repairs, as of 2009 the bridge structure's sufficiency rating on the National Bridge Inventory was 17.2 percent and its condition was deemed "basically intolerable requiring high priority of corrective action".

== Names ==
The covered bridge is 1.4 miles (2.3 km) south of Pennsylvania Route 184 on Campbell Road (Township Road 784), 0.1 miles (0.2 km) past the intersection with Covered Bridge Road. Its official name on the National Register of Historic Places (NRHP) is "Cogan House Covered Bridge". It is the only covered bridge ever built in Cogan House Township and the name comes from the township, as well as the village of Cogan House, which is northeast of the bridge. Cogan House Township and the village are named for David Cogan, who settled on Larrys Creek in 1825. Cogan was one of the few settlers in the area for many years and grew tired of living nearly alone in the wilderness. In 1842 he abandoned his homestead, as did a neighbor named Carter. Their houses were used by hunters and travelers and the name Cogan's House was given to the area. Cogan House Township was formed from parts of Jackson and Mifflin Townships on December 6, 1843.

Since the bridge's 1998 restoration, the Lycoming County Commissioners have officially called it the "Buckhorn Covered Bridge". The name comes from the bridge's location at the base of Buckhorn Mountain, and from the road to the former village of Buckhorn, which crossed the creek on it. This is the name used on the official plaque erected by the commissioners to mark its restoration and placement on the NRHP, despite the different name used on the Register itself. The commissioners chose "Buckhorn Covered Bridge" based on one of the names used in Benjamin and June Evans' 1993 book Pennsylvania's Covered Bridges: A Complete Guide. Historically, the commissioners used "Cogan House Covered Bridge" as the official name.

Historian Milton W. Landis uses "Larrys Creek Covered Bridge" since it crosses Larrys Creek, and notes this was the name used by other local historians. Larrys Creek is named for Larry Burt, who was the first settler at the mouth of the creek when the surveyors came through in 1769. Landis acknowledges the "Cogan House" name, and says the bridge has also been known by the names of "several tenants who lived in the little farm adjacent" to it.

While Landis does not give these different names, two other names for the bridge are known and may come from some of these tenants. The first of these is "Day's Bridge" and it is clear that this is another name for the Cogan House Covered Bridge. The second of these, "Plankenhorn Bridge", is a name in a list of existing and vanished covered bridges in Lycoming County. Although the association of this name with the Cogan House Covered Bridge is not made explicitly, it is described as still standing on Larrys Creek and being north of a bridge in Mifflin Township. This is the only known covered bridge that meets those criteria.

== History ==
=== Background ===
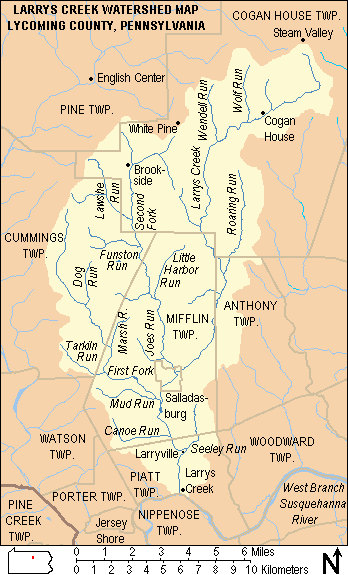
Map of the covered bridge's location on Larrys Creek

The first covered bridge in the United States was built over the Schuylkill River in Philadelphia, Pennsylvania in 1800. Some of the first Burr arch truss covered bridges were also built in the state. Pennsylvania is estimated to have once had at least 1,500 covered bridges, and is believed to have had the most in the country between 1830 and 1875. In 2001 Pennsylvania had more surviving historic covered bridges than any other state, with 221 remaining in 40 of the commonwealth's 67 counties.

Covered bridges were a transition between stone and cast-iron and steel bridges. In 19th-century Pennsylvania, lumber was an abundant resource for bridge construction, but did not last long when exposed to weather and the elements. The roof and enclosed sides of covered bridges protected the structural elements, allowing some of these bridges to survive well over a century. A Burr arch truss consists of a load-bearing arch sandwiching multiple King posts, resulting in a bridge which is both stronger and more rigid than one built using either element alone.

In 1850 a plank road was built in Lycoming County, from the mouth of Larrys Creek to the borough of Salladasburg, Pennsylvania. It was later extended north along the Second Fork of Larrys Creek as far as the unincorporated villages of Brookside and White Pine in Cogan House Township, and eventually went as far as the large tannery in the village of English Center in Pine Township on Little Pine Creek. Another branch of the plank road followed Larrys Creek itself north from Salladasburg. While its exact length is unknown, Landis reports it may have reached nearly to the site of the covered bridge.

Before there was a bridge, there was a ford at the site where the bridge was later built. Wagons of finished leather and raw hides came from and went to the English Center tannery via White Pine, seeking to avoid traffic on the plank road along the Second Fork. Other traffic went to and from a large sawmill at White Pine and other mills to the west and north. Traffic from the north crossed Larrys Creek, and continued either east over Buckhorn Mountain to the Williamsport and Elmira Railroad at the village of Cogan Station on Lycoming Creek, or south down the road along Larrys Creek. This road led to a tannery on Larrys Creek about 1 mile (1.6 km) south of the ford, and to the plank road along the main branch of the creek. The plank road was a toll road and connected with another railroad, the West Branch Division of the Pennsylvania Canal, and the West Branch Susquehanna River at the creek's mouth.

Because the ford was often impassable in winter or bad weather, or during high water, a petition from the citizens of Cogan House Township for a bridge to be built was filed in September 1876. They asked the county to build the bridge as it was beyond the resources of the township to do so. The petition was read on September 30, 1876, and three viewers were appointed on November 3 to examine the site and report back. The viewers reported back in favor of building the bridge on November 25. On January 23, 1877, the county grand jury approved the report and the construction of the bridge.

=== Construction and description ===
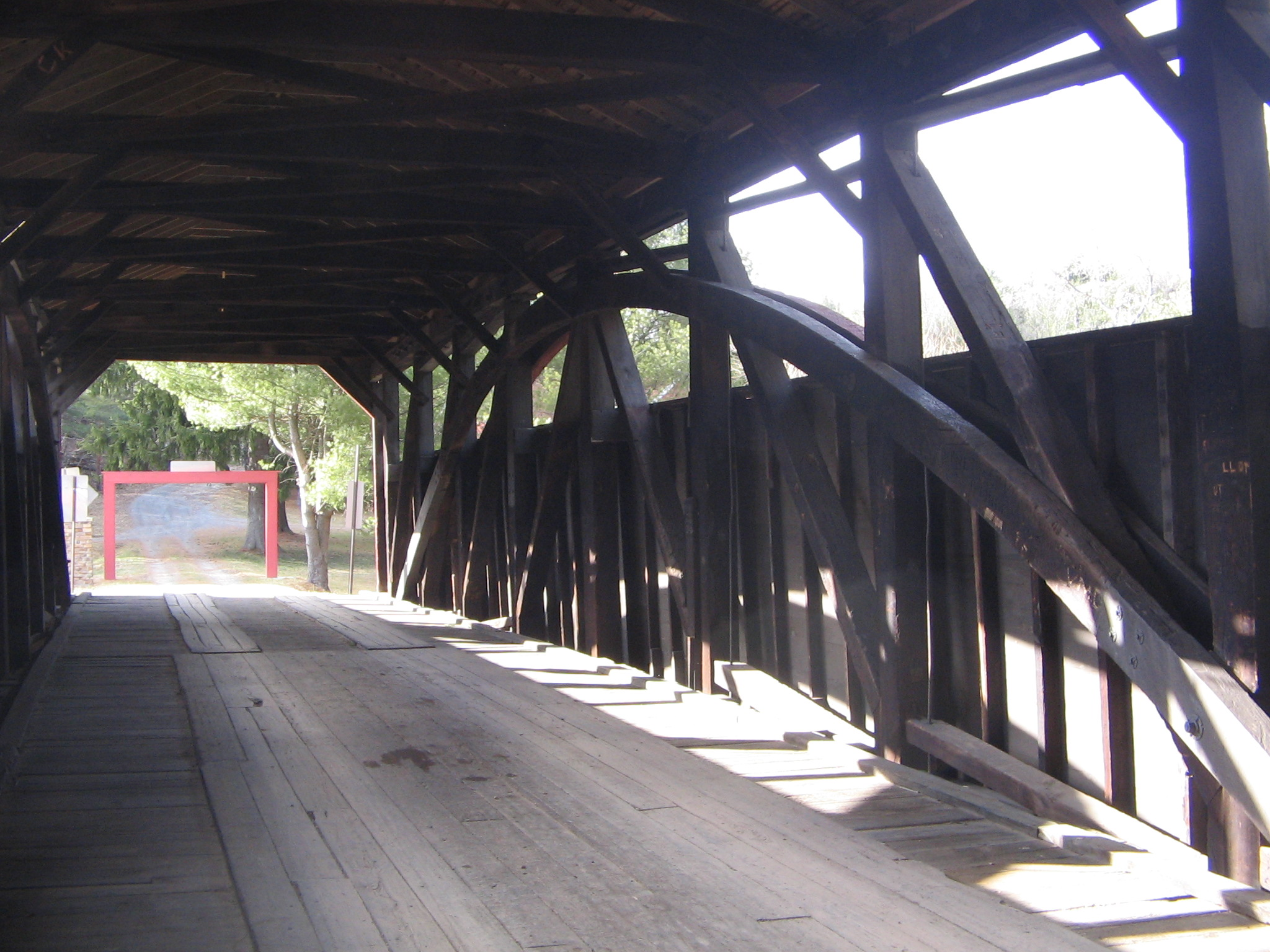
Interior view of a Burr Arch and timber framing; the red metal framework beyond the west entrance prevents vehicles larger than the posted limits from entering.

Landis is not certain if the bridge was built in 1877 or 1878, but every other source that mentions the date agrees it was 1877. Valentine ("Tine") Meyers (or Meyer), a millwright and resident of the hamlet of Quiggleville in Lycoming Township, built the bridge. The timbers for the bridge were cut at an "up and down", steam powered sawmill owned by Robert Wood, a short distance north of the bridge site. The head sawyer at the mill was John Mecum. The wood used was pine, cut in nearby forests and hauled in ox carts to the mill. The largest timbers used in the bridge are up to 16 feet (4.9 m) long.

Meyers is not believed to have had much experience building bridges and set about construction in a unique manner. The timber framework was first assembled in a field next to the sawmill, with each new piece bolted into place after being cut. If a piece did not fit, more careful measurements were made and a new piece was cut and tested. The outlines of the sections for curved beams for the Burr arch were first marked with chalk on the wood, then the saw crew lifted and guided it by hand against the sawblade to cut the curve. After the framework was completed in the field, it was taken apart, loaded onto the same ox carts used to bring the logs to the mill, and taken to the bridge site. There the framework was reassembled on the bridge abutments. Bolts were used to hold all of the large pieces together, while cross-pieces and small braces were nailed in place.

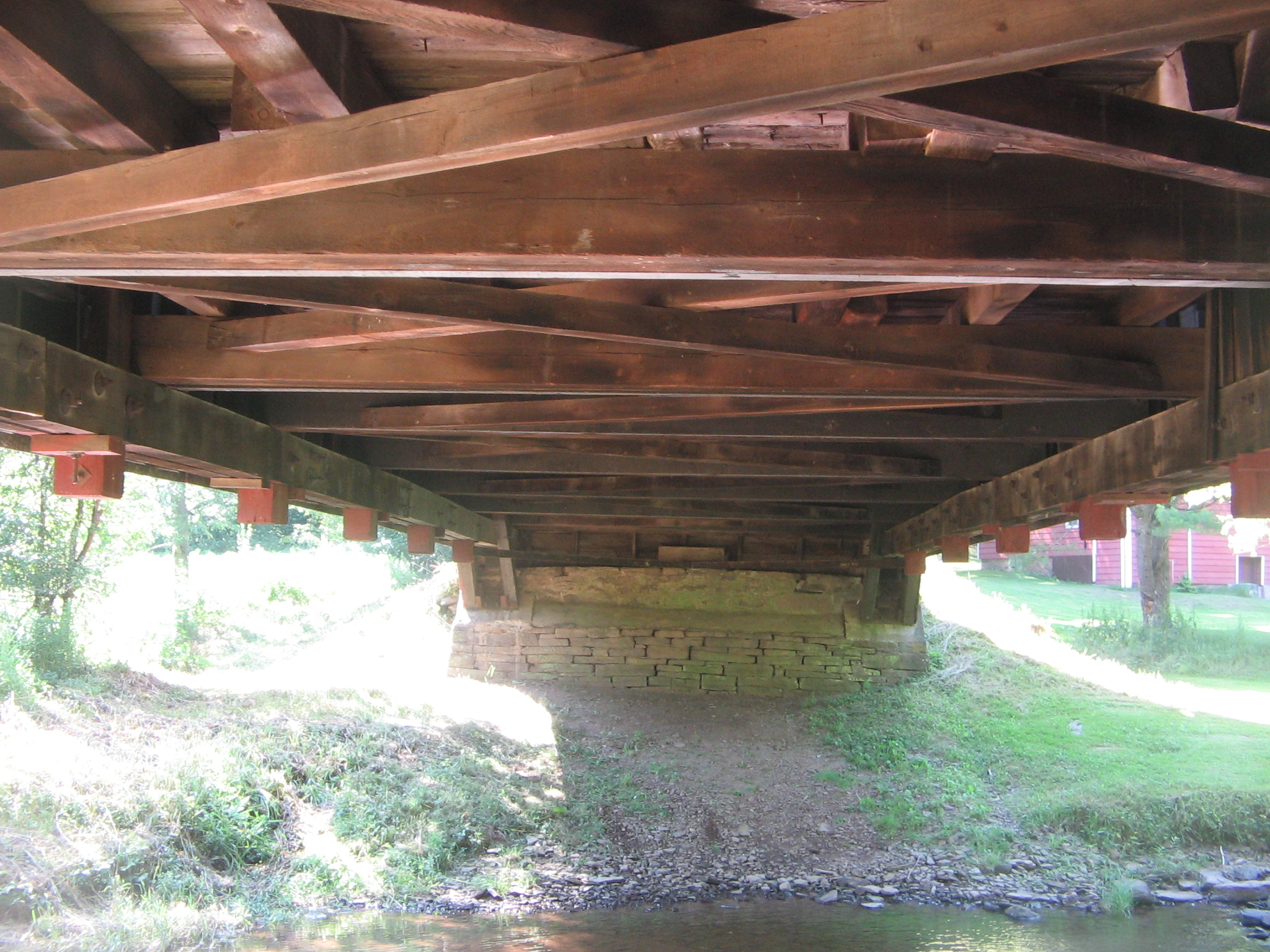
Underside of the bridge looking west

The Cogan House Covered Bridge was added to the NRHP in 1980 and was listed on the 2009 National Bridge Inventory (NBI). According to the NBI, the covered bridge is 94 feet 2 inches (28.7 m) long, with a roadway 14 feet 5 inches (4.4 m) wide, and a maximum load of 7.2 short tons (6.5 t). According to the NRHP, the bridge's "road surface width" is 19 feet 7 inches (6.0 m), the load is 4.0 short tons (3.6 t), and the clearance height is 10 feet 6 inches (3.2 m). The width is only sufficient for a single lane of traffic. As of 2011, the clearance height posted on the bridge itself has been reduced to 8 feet 6 inches (2.6 m), and the posted maximum load has been reduced to 3.0 short tons (2.7 t). According to Landis, the top of the Burr arch is nearly 11 feet (3.4 m) above the floor of the bridge.

The covered bridge rests on the original stone abutments, which have since been reinforced with concrete made of cement. The bridge deck is made of crosswise planking, overlaid with runners in the western half and lengthwise planking in the eastern half. The upper part of the portals and the clapboard siding is made of pine boards, and stops 3 feet (0.9 m) below the roof line. Although the bridge was painted red as part of its 1998 restoration, in 1964 it was described as unpainted, and it does not seem to have been painted in 1980, as the NRHP nomination form describes how "its rough horizontal siding ... help[s] this small bridge blend into the surrounding forest". The roof was originally covered with wooden shingles. The bridge does not have parapets and has "no steel reinforcements".

=== Use and restoration ===
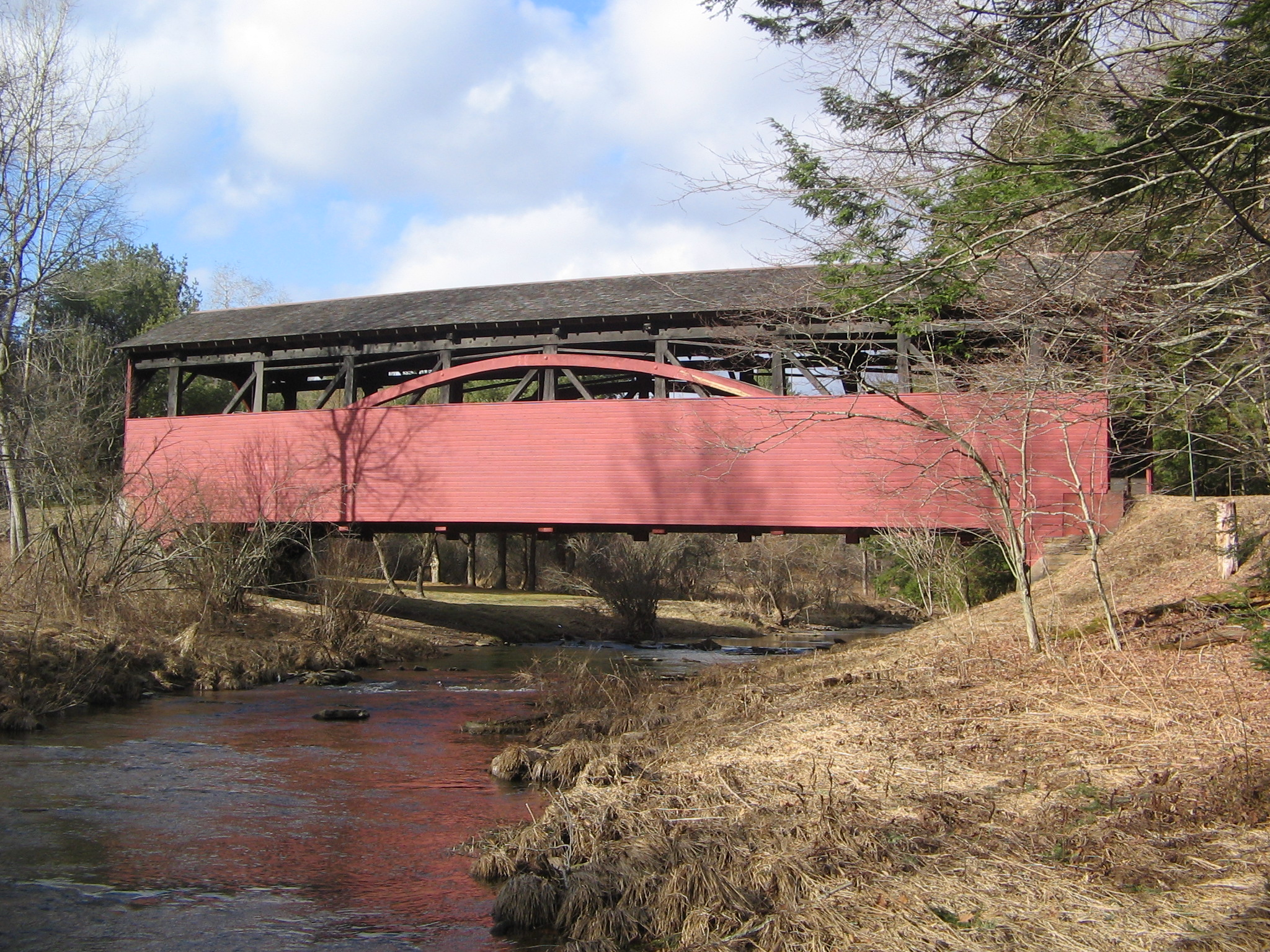
View of the bridge over Larrys Creek, with the Burr arch (red) and Kingposts (black) visible above the siding

The Cogan House Covered Bridge was the only one on Larrys Creek to survive a major flood on June 1, 1889, which washed out most other bridges throughout Lycoming County. A large fallen maple tree formed a dam across Larrys Creek, just upstream of the bridge; this dam blocked debris and diverted the brunt of the floodwaters. The same flood destroyed the Larrys Creek plank road and the canal at the creek's mouth. The same storm system also caused the Johnstown Flood, which killed over 2,200 people.

After the flood the plank road was only reconstructed as far north as Salladasburg, so for a time all the traffic from the English Center tannery went over the bridge on the way to the railroad at Cogan Station. However, the virgin timber which supplied the local tanneries and sawmills was all clear-cut within several years of the flood. Without timber, the industries that used the roads leading to the bridge closed and the local villages declined, or, in the case of Buckhorn, disappeared.

By 1900, there were four remaining covered bridges on Larrys Creek: going upstream they were at the hamlet of Larryville in Piatt Township, at or near Mud Run in Mifflin Township, in Salladasburg, and in Cogan House Township. As of 2011, the Cogan House Covered Bridge is the oldest and longest of three 19th-century covered bridges remaining in Lycoming County (the others are the Buttonwood Covered Bridge in Jackson Township over Blockhouse Creek, and the Lairdsville Covered Bridge in Moreland Township over Little Muncy Creek).

The bridge had "needed repairs" made in 1964, and the original stone abutments were reinforced with concrete prior to 1966. It was added to the NRHP on July 24, 1980 in a Multiple Property Submission of seven Covered Bridges of Bradford, Sullivan and Lycoming Counties, and was "painted and creosoted" in 1981. The 1980 NRHP form and Zacher's 1994 book both list the bridge's condition as good. The Lycoming County Commissioners had the bridge "rehabilitated" in 1998, at a cost of $105,493. The general contractor for the restoration was Lycoming Supply Inc., which replaced some structural beams with treated southern pine and the "Dutch lap" or clapboard siding with white pine. The purlins and rafters were reconstructed using treated yellow pine, and support a new roof of cedar shake shingles. The deck and floor of the bridge were solid and required few repairs. The bridge was painted red, and a stone pillar was built with plaques marking the restoration and the bridge's inclusion on the NRHP.

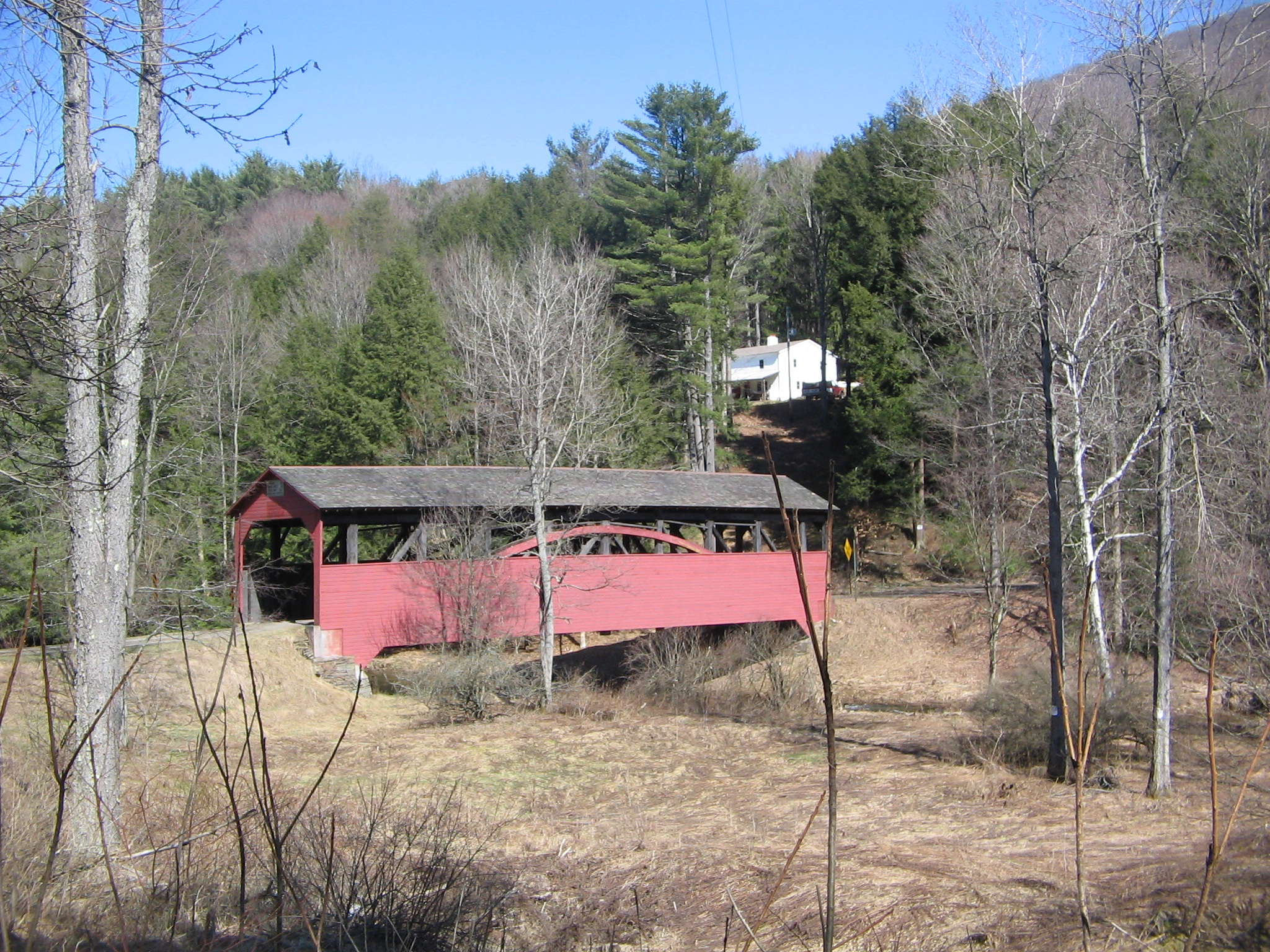
View of the bridge and Larrys Creek from the southwest, with the private hunting cabin (white) on Buckhorn Mountain behind it

Because the bridge is listed on the NRHP, the Pennsylvania Historical and Museum Commission had to approve the renovation. Pennsylvania Department of Transportation (PennDOT) and Federal Highway Administration (FHWA) funds helped pay for the work done. The dedication ceremony was held on October 30, 1998, with Lycoming County Commissioner Russell Reitz and PennDOT Director of Municipal Services Thomas Lyons cutting a plank on wooden sawhorses with an old crosscut saw as the ribbon cutting ceremony. The other county commissioners and the local state representative and state senator were also present and spoke, as did a representative of the "Theodore Burr Covered Bridge Society of Pennsylvania".

In August 2000 an inspection revealed that one of the timber arches of the Cogan House Covered Bridge was damaged by a vehicle which was over the weight limit crossing the bridge. A propane delivery truck making a delivery to the private hunting cabin served by the bridge is thought to have caused the damage. Lycoming Supply Inc. won the bid to do the repair work in December, at a cost of $6,300. Before the repair the bridge remained open and was safe to use. The Evans' 2001 book describes the condition of the bridge as excellent.

Despite the restoration and repairs, the 2009 FHWA National Bridge Inventory found the sufficiency rating of the bridge structure to be 17.2 percent.^{[a]} The inventory found the condition of the bridge deck and the substructure was satisfactory, while the superstructure was poor. It further found that the bridge's foundations were "determined to be stable for assessed or calculated scour conditions", however the railings "do not meet currently acceptable standards". Its overall condition was deemed "basically intolerable requiring high priority of corrective action"; the 2006 NBI estimated the cost to improve the bridge at $143,000.

The bridge is still used, although the public dirt road to it ends in a cul de sac on the east side. A gated private road continues to the private hunting camp and provides access to Pennsylvania State Game Lands No. 114. The bridge has a posted speed limit of 10 miles per hour (16 km/h) and its average daily traffic was ten vehicles in 2009. Pennsylvania's Covered Bridges: A Complete Guide notes that despite being "located in a rather remote area, it is worth the trip to see this beautifully restored historic treasure."

== Bridge data ==
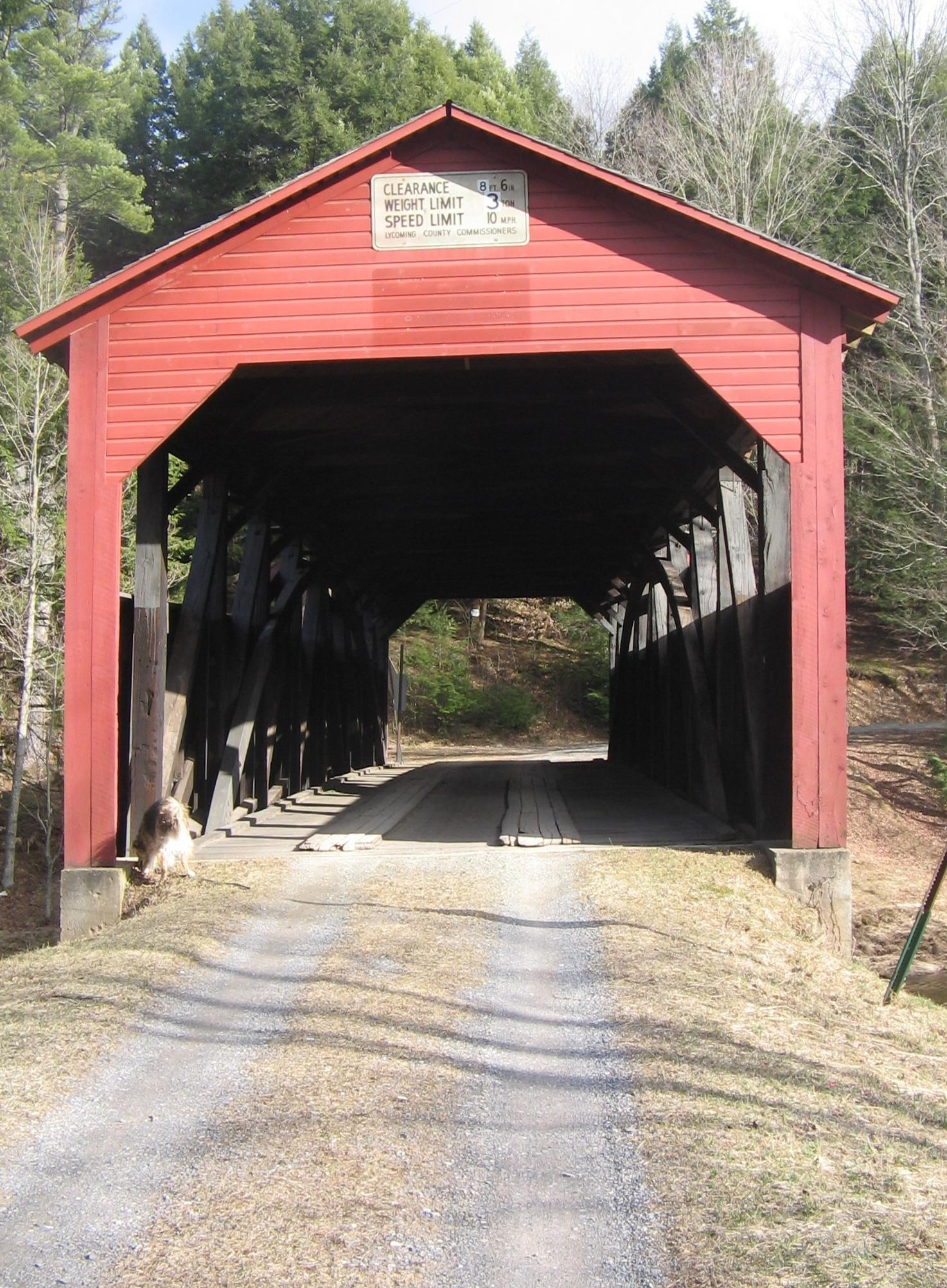
The west entrance to the bridge with posted height and weight limits

The following table is a comparison of published measurements of length, width and load recorded in five different sources using different methods, as well as the name or names cited. The NBI measures bridge length between the "backwalls of abutments" or pavement grooves and the roadway width as "the most restrictive minimum distance between curbs or rails". The NRHP form was prepared by the Pennsylvania Historical and Museum Commission (PHMC), which surveyed county engineers, historical and covered bridge societies, and others for all the covered bridges in the commonwealth. The Evans visited every covered bridge in Pennsylvania in 2001 and measured each bridge's length (portal to portal) and width (at the portal) for their book. The data in Zacher's book was based on a 1991 survey of all covered bridges in Pennsylvania by the PHMC and the Pennsylvania Department of Transportation, aided by local government and private agencies. The article uses primarily the NBI and NRHP data, as they are national programs.

Variants in Forksville Covered Bridge data
Length feet (m)	Width feet (m)	Load short tons (MT)	Name(s) used	Source (Year)
95 feet (29.0 m)	17 feet 6 inches (5.3 m)	3.0 short tons (2.7 t)	Larrys Creek, Cogan House	Landis (1966, 1981)
94 feet 2 inches (28.7 m)	14 feet 5 inches (4.4 m)	7.2 short tons (6.5 t)	Cogan House	NBI (2009)
93 feet (28.3 m)	19 feet 7 inches (6.0 m)	4.0 short tons (3.6 t)	Cogan House	NRHP (1980)
91 feet 10 inches (28.0 m)	17 feet 3 inches (5.3 m)	NA	Cogan House, Buckhorn	Evans (2001)
81 feet (24.7 m)	19 feet 7 inches (6.0 m)	NA	Cogan House	Zacher (1994)

== See also ==
- List of covered bridges on the National Register of Historic Places in Pennsylvania
- List of tributaries of Larrys Creek

== Note ==
a. The National Highway Administration established the sufficiency rating, which can vary from a low of 0 to a high of 100, as a way to prioritize federal funding for bridges. The rating is calculated for bridges over 20 feet (6.1 m) long, based on "structural adequacy, whether the bridge is functionally obsolete, and level of service provided to the public". Federal funds are available for replacement of bridges with a rating of 50 or below, while those with a rating of 80 or below qualify for rehabilitation. In 2009, Pennsylvania had 22,280 bridges on the NBI, of which 43.8 percent were either structurally deficient (27.2 percent) or functionally obsolete (16.6 percent).
