= Larrys Creek =

Tributary of the West Branch Susquehanna River

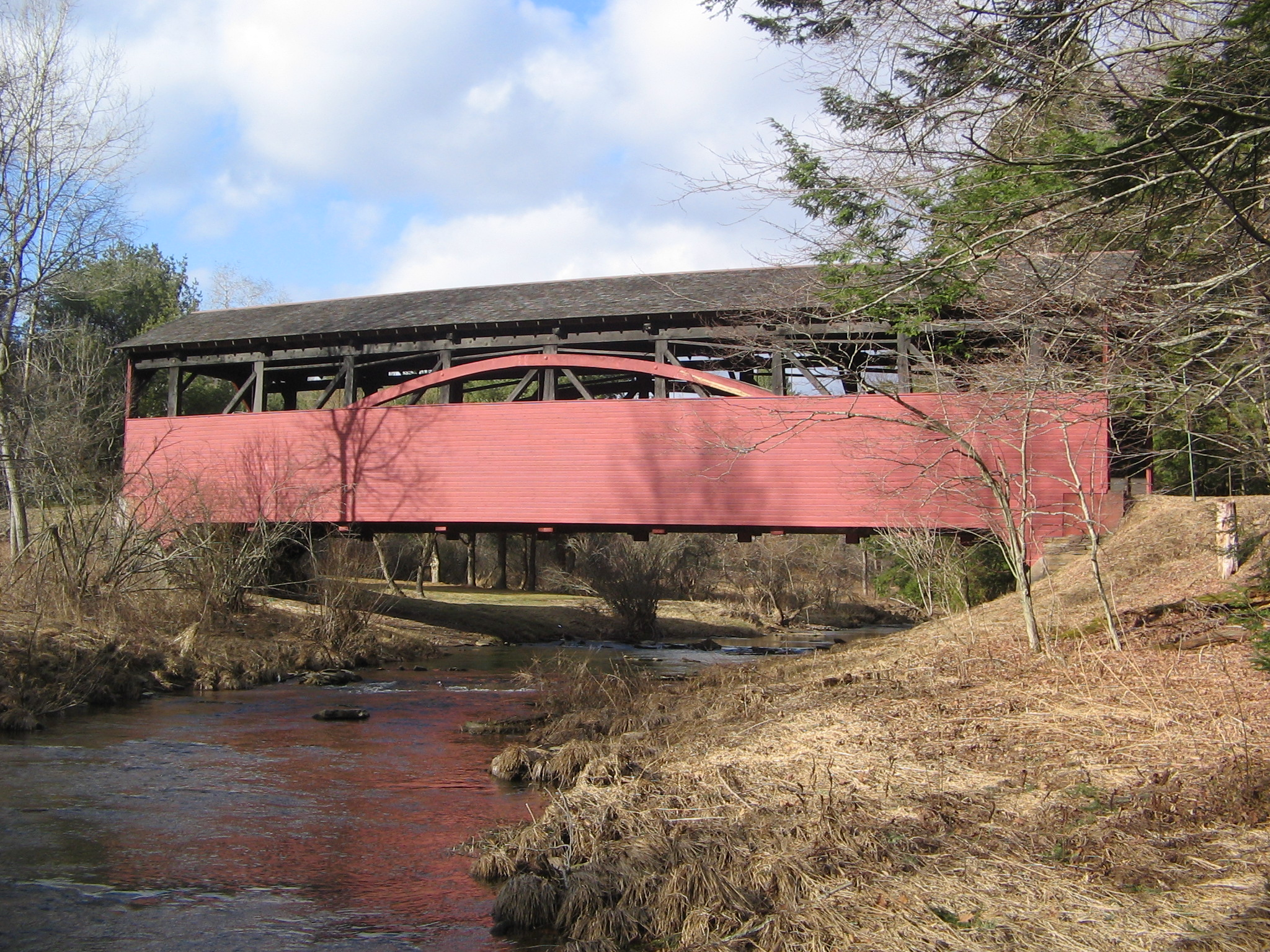
- Larrys Creek and the Cogan House Covered Bridge in Cogan House Township, Pennsylvania

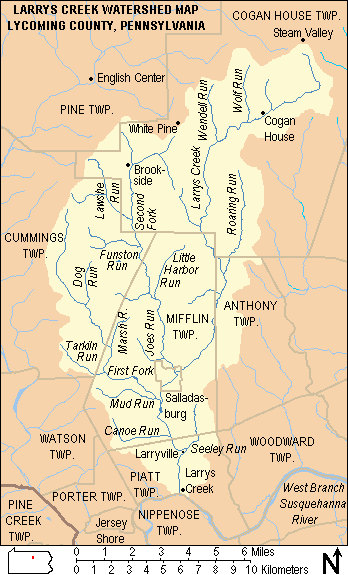
- Map showing Larrys Creek, its major tributaries and watershed

- Location of the Mouth of Larrys Creek in Lycoming County, Pennsylvania
- Etymology: Larry Burt, first settler

Location
- Country: United States
- State: Pennsylvania
- County: Lycoming

Physical characteristics
- Source: near the hamlet of Steam Valley
  - location: Cogan House Township, Lycoming County, Pennsylvania
  - coordinates: 41°27′13″N 77°08′12″W
  - elevation: 1,740 ft (530 m)
- Mouth: West Branch Susquehanna River
  - location: Piatt Township, Lycoming County, Pennsylvania
  - coordinates: 41°13′00″N 77°13′13″W
  - elevation: 515 ft (157 m)
- Length: 22.9 mi (36.9 km)
- Basin size: 89.1 mi^{2} (231 km^{2})
- Discharge
  - location: Mouth
  - average: 66.0 cu ft/s (1.87 m^{3}/s)
  - minimum: 8.8 cu ft/s (0.25 m^{3}/s)
  - maximum: 114 cu ft/s (3.2 m^{3}/s)
- Discharge
  - location: Cogan House
  - average: 10.8 cu ft/s (0.31 m^{3}/s)

Larrys Creek is a 22.9-mile-long (36.9 km) tributary of the West Branch Susquehanna River in Lycoming County in the U.S. state of Pennsylvania. A part of the Chesapeake Bay drainage basin, its watershed drains 89.1 square miles (231 km^{2}) in six townships and a borough. The creek flows south from the dissected Allegheny Plateau to the Ridge-and-valley Appalachians through sandstone, limestone, and shale from the Devonian, Mississippian, and Pennsylvanian periods.

The valley's first recorded inhabitants were the Susquehannocks, followed by the Lenape and other tribes. The Great Shamokin Path crossed the creek near its mouth, where Larry Burt, the first Euro-American settler and the man who gave the creek its present name, also lived by 1769. In the 19th century, the creek and its watershed were a center for logging and related industries, including 53 sawmills, grist mills, leather tanneries, coal and iron mines. A 1903 newspaper article claimed "No other stream in the country had so many mills in so small a territory". For transportation, a plank road ran along much of the creek for decades, and two "paper railroads" were planned, but never built.

As of 2006, the Larrys Creek watershed is 83.1% forest and 15.7% agricultural (a reforestation of land clear-cut in the 19th century). Nearly 9,000 acres (3,600 ha) of second-growth forest are protected public and private land for hunting and trout fishing, with more land protected in parts of Tiadaghton State Forest. Pollution from past industrial use is gone and Larrys Creek "has an exceptionally scenic, ultra-highwater, whitewater run" for canoeing. Despite agricultural runoff and small amounts of acid mine drainage, water quality is quite good, and a water filtration plant on Larrys Creek supplies over 2500 customers.

== Name ==
Larrys Creek is named for Larry Burt, the first European settler in the area, who lived near the mouth of the creek outside what is now the hamlet of Larrys Creek in Piatt Township. He traded with the indigenous peoples, and, according to a tradition reported by Meginness (1892), he had a Native American wife. Larry Burt was already there when surveyors came through in 1769 (after the land was purchased by the colonial government of Pennsylvania on November 5, 1768, as part of the "New Purchase" in the first Treaty of Fort Stanwix), but disappeared sometime soon after, perhaps moving west with the Native Americans who left the area.

Larrys Creek is the only major creek in Lycoming County for which a Native American name is unknown. As of 2006, it is the only stream named "Larrys Creek" on USGS maps of the United States and in the USGS Geographic Names Information System. The possessive apostrophe is not part of the official name of the creek, although records from the 19th century often spell it as "Larry's Creek" (as do some highway bridge signs today).

Today the creek has given its name to the hamlet at its mouth, as well as the village of "Larryville" further upstream. Before it became a borough, Salladasburg was also known as "Larrys Creek" (from the name of its post office). The "First Fork" and "Second Fork" of Larrys Creek are named in the order in which they are encountered traveling upstream, with "Fork" here denoting a major tributary. "Lawshe Run", the major tributary of the Second Fork, is named for Robert Lawshe, who established a tannery in Salladasburg in 1848. "Seeley Run", a minor tributary entering the creek at Larryville, is named for Mr. Seely, who built the first sawmill on Larrys Creek in 1796. While the USGS uses "Seeley Run", it is still "Seely Run Road" that follows the stream. The First Fork, Canoe Run, Joes Run, and Wolf Run also have roads named for them.

== Course ==
Larrys Creek is the only major watershed in Lycoming County entirely within the county. Measured directly, Lycoming County is about 130 miles (210 km) northwest of Philadelphia and 165 miles (266 km) east-northeast of Pittsburgh. It is 53.0 miles (85.3 km) from the mouth of Larrys Creek along the West Branch Susquehanna River to its confluence with the Susquehanna River at Northumberland, Pennsylvania. The source of Larrys Creek is in northern Lycoming County in Cogan House Township, just south of the hamlet of Steam Valley, at an elevation of 1,740 feet (530 m) It flows west-southwest through the village of Cogan House, and then under the Cogan House Covered Bridge.

The creek next heads due south through Pennsylvania State Game Lands Number 114. There it runs for about 3 miles (4.8 km) with only a trail or unimproved road beside it. It passes through Mifflin Township for a short distance and heads southeast into Anthony Township, where it leaves the State Game Lands and passes a water filtration plant; there is a dam 8.5 feet (2.6 m) tall and 52.5 feet (16.0 m) wide here. Further south, it receives Roaring Run (on the left bank). Roaring Run receives the only acid mine drainage in the watershed and enters Larrys Creek 10.4 miles (16.7 km) from the mouth.

Larrys Creek then heads southwest back into Mifflin Township, where it passes through the borough of Salladasburg, with Pennsylvania Route 973 running parallel to the creek from the township line to the borough. At Salladasburg, Larrys Creek receives its major tributary, the Second Fork of Larrys Creek, on the right bank 5.8 miles (9.3 km) from the mouth.

The Second Fork rises in Cogan House Township near the village of White Pine and runs south through the village of Brookside, then a few miles through Cummings Township, and last through Mifflin Township and Salladasburg. Lawshe Run is its major tributary. Pennsylvania Route 287 runs parallel to the Second Fork its whole length, and continues parallel to Larrys Creek from Salladasburg south to its terminus on U.S. Route 220 (near the creek's mouth).

Just south of Salladasburg, Larrys Creek receives the First Fork of Larrys Creek, 4.2 miles (6.8 km) from the mouth. The First Fork has its source in Cummings Township and flows south-southeast into Mifflin Township. 2.8 miles (4.5 km) from its mouth Larrys Creek receives Canoe Run. Both these tributaries enter on the right bank.

Larrys Creek then enters Piatt Township, flowing east around a ridge and through the village of Larryville where it receives Seeley Run on the left bank, 1.5 miles (2.4 km) from the mouth. It next flows back southwest, then south to the hamlet of Larrys Creek and finally into the West Branch Susquehanna River, 2.6 miles (4.2 km) east of the borough of Jersey Shore, at an elevation of 515 feet (157 m). U.S. Route 220 and the Lycoming Valley Railroad cross the creek on separate bridges just north of its mouth. The direct distance between the source and mouth is only 16.9 miles (27.2 km). The difference in elevation between source and mouth, 1,225 feet (373 m), divided by the length of the creek, 22.9 miles (36.9 km), gives the average drop in elevation per unit length of creek or relief ratio of 53.5 feet per mile (10.1 m/km). The meander ratio is 1.08, so the creek is fairly straight in its bed.

=== Discharge ===
From 1960 to 1979, the United States Geological Survey (USGS) operated one stream gauge on Larrys Creek at the village of Cogan House, for the uppermost 6.8 square miles (18 km^{2}) of the watershed. The mean discharge measured at this site from 1961 to 1978 was 10.8 cubic feet per second (0.31 m^{3}/s), with a peak discharge of 1,130 cubic feet per second (32 m^{3}/s) and peak gauge height of 5.29 feet (1.61 m), both on June 22, 1972, during Hurricane Agnes. The USGS also estimated mean monthly and annual groundwater recharge at the Cogan House stream gauge. Using data from 1961 to 1977, the upper and lower annual recharge estimates were 18.1 to 14.5 inches (46 to 37 cm), and the greatest monthly recharge was in March, with 20.1% of the annual total.

The USGS also measured discharge at the village of Larrys Creek, very near the creek's mouth, as part of water quality measurements on seven occasions between 1970 and 1975. The average discharge was 66.0 cubic feet per second (1.87 m^{3}/s), and ranged from a high of 114 cubic feet per second (3.2 m^{3}/s) to a low of 8.8 cubic feet per second (0.25 m^{3}/s). Lycoming County operates a stream gauge at Salladasburg as part of the county-wide flood warning system. It only measures the water height (not discharge) and had a peak gauge height of 8.0 feet (2.4 m), on September 18, 2004, during Hurricane Ivan.

== Geology ==
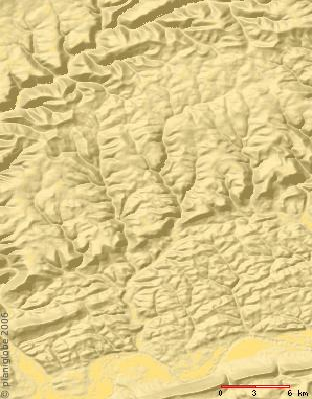
Relief map of the Larrys Creek Watershed in the dissected Allegheny Plateau

Larrys Creek is in a sandstone, limestone, and shale mountain region, with the source in the dissected Allegheny Plateau and the mouth in the Ridge-and-valley Appalachians. The southern part of the Larrys Creek watershed has sedimentary surface rocks from the Devonian period, with a large area from the Mississippian period in the north of the watershed and a small Pennsylvanian period region within this area. The Cogan House anticline runs north of and parallel to the upper part of the creek. Iron ore within the watershed was mined south of Salladasburg and along Canoe Run in the 19th century; there are also deposits on Puterbaugh Mountain.

Larrys Creek is in a narrow valley formed by mountains and hills, with steep to moderate slopes. The channel pattern is regular, with a dendritic drainage pattern. South of its source, the creek turns to flow southwest along the northern edge of Green Mountain, turns south into the State Game Lands at Buckhorn Mountain, and flows south along the western edge of Coal Mountain. The only named peak on the west bank of Larrys Creek itself is Harris Point, where it leaves the dissected Allegheny Plateau.

The Second Fork flows south along the eastern side of Henson Ridge, then east of Puterbaugh Mountain. The only named peak on the east bank of the Second Fork is Clapp Point, which marks the boundary of the dissected plateau and is southwest of Harris Point. The First Fork flows past the southwest edge of Little Round Top and then continues on the southwest side of Puterbaugh Mountain. Fishery Point is at the southern end of the Allegheny Plateau, just west of the First Fork. The three features named Point are each part of the Allegheny Front, the edge of the Allegheny Plateau.

The Larrys Creek watershed has two deposits of low volatile bituminous coal along Roaring Run and a small, deep natural gas field. A potentially large source of natural gas is the Marcellus Shale, which lies 1.5 to 2.0 miles (2.4 to 3.2 km) below the surface here and stretches from New York through Pennsylvania to Ohio and West Virginia. Estimates of the total natural gas in the black shale from the Devonian era range from 168 to 516 trillion cubic feet (4.76 to 14.6 trillion m^{3}), with at least 10 percent considered recoverable. In November 2007, drilling within the Larrys Creek watershed started in Mifflin Township, just west of Salladasburg, with a 1.5 miles (2.4 km) deep well. A second well was drilled in Mifflin Township in December 2007, and by February 2008 every well drilled in Lycoming County was producing natural gas. The Marcellus Shale requires special techniques to fracture the rock and release the gas, including pumping sand and water into the well, and, in some cases, horizontal drilling.

== Watershed ==
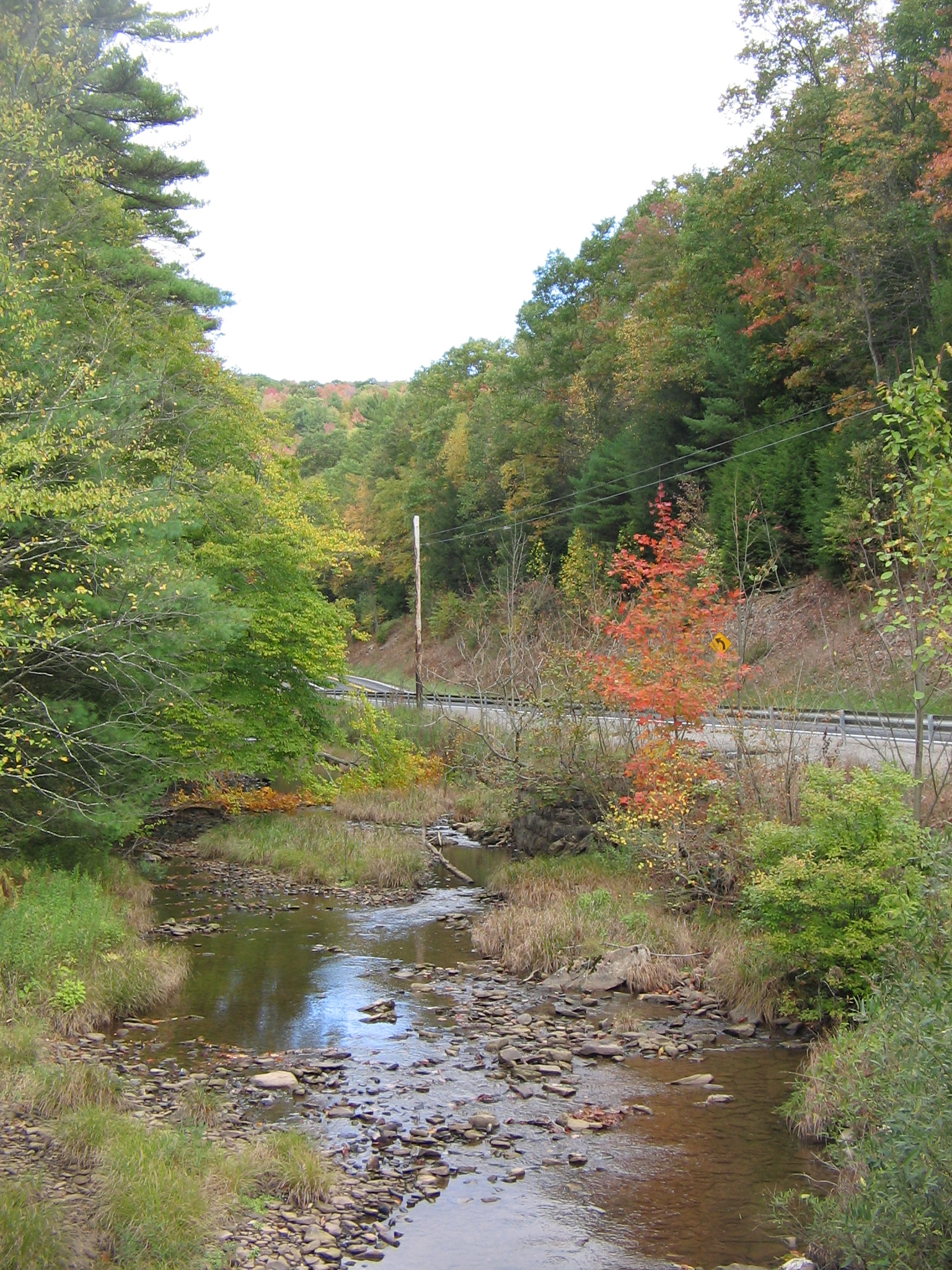
Second Fork is the largest tributary; Pennsylvania Route 287 runs parallel to it for its entire length

The Larrys Creek watershed is entirely in Lycoming County and accounts for 7.17% of the county by area. It is the only major creek whose watershed is entirely in the county, and lies between the Pine Creek watershed (including Little Pine Creek) 5.2 miles (8.4 km) to the west and the Lycoming Creek watershed 11.9 miles (19.2 km) to the east (as measured on the river).

The Larrys Creek watershed has a total population of 2,513 (as of 2000) and a total area of 89.1 square miles (231 km^{2}). Of that area, 74 square miles (190 km^{2}) are forested and 14 square miles (36 km^{2}) are given to agricultural uses. Larrys Creek is the largest creek in Lycoming County without its own watershed association.

=== Tributaries ===
The major smaller streams in the Larrys Creek watershed include the First and Second Forks, Roaring Run, Lawshe Run, and Canoe Run. The Second Fork is the largest tributary, with a watershed of 24.9 square miles (64 km^{2}) or 28.0% of the total watershed. The First Fork is next largest, with a watershed of 17.6 square miles (46 km^{2}) or 19.8% of the total. Roaring Run accounts for 5.7% of the total watershed with 5.1 square miles (13 km^{2}) and other tributaries are less than 5% of the total.

Starting at the mouth, the tributaries of Larrys Creek are: Seeley Run, Canoe Run, First Fork Larrys Creek, Second Fork Larrys Creek, Mash Run, "Pond Hollow", "Spook Hollow", Roaring Run, "Cramer Hollow", "Pot Lick Hollow", "Match Pine Hollow", "Watt Hollow", Long Run, Wendell Run, Crayton Hollow Run, Wolf Run, Dibber Hollow Run, and Birch Run (unnamed streams in a named feature are given as the name of the feature in quotation marks).

=== Water quality, pollution, and filtration plant ===
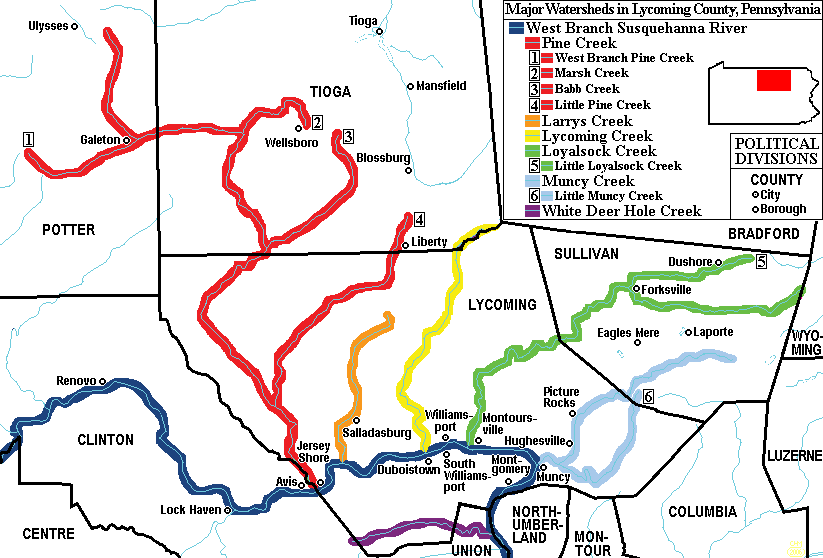
West Branch Susquehanna River (dark blue) and Major Streams in Lycoming County, Pennsylvania; Larrys Creek (orange) is the second major creek entering the river in the county, between the Pine Creek (including Little Pine Creek) (red) and Lycoming Creek (yellow) watersheds

The clear-cutting of forests in the 19th century adversely affected the ecology of the Larrys Creek watershed and its water quality. Polluting industries on the creek and its tributaries during that period included coal and iron mines and tanneries. As of 2006, water quality in Larrys Creek is quite good, although two small unnamed tributaries of Roaring Run do receive acid mine drainage from an abandoned coal mine. Agricultural runoff is another source of pollution. Effluent limits for Larrys Creek in Mifflin Township for the 5-day test for carbonaceous biochemical oxygen demand (CBOD_{5}) are 25 mg/L, while fecal coliform bacteria count limits are 200 per 100 mL in May through September, and 2000 per 100 mL in October through April.

The mean annual precipitation for Larrys Creek is 40 to 42 inches (1,000 to 1,100 mm). According to the Pennsylvania Fish and Boat Commission: "Pennsylvania receives the most acid deposition of any state in the nation because, in addition to being the third highest producer of the gases that cause acid deposition, we are also located downwind from the highest concentration of air pollution emitters." The region's geology gives it a relatively low capacity to neutralize added acid. This makes the creek especially vulnerable to increased acidification from rain, which poses a threat to the long-term health of the plants and animals in the creek.

The Jersey Shore Area Joint Water Authority's water filtration plant is on Larrys Creek, near the border between Mifflin and Anthony Townships. The plant has been there since at least 1914 and provides water from the creek to 2,500 industrial and residential customers in the boroughs of Jersey Shore and Salladasburg, as well as Anthony, Mifflin, Nippenose, Piatt, and Porter Townships in southwestern Lycoming County, and Pine Creek Township in the southeastern part of neighboring Clinton County, Pennsylvania.

=== Recreation ===
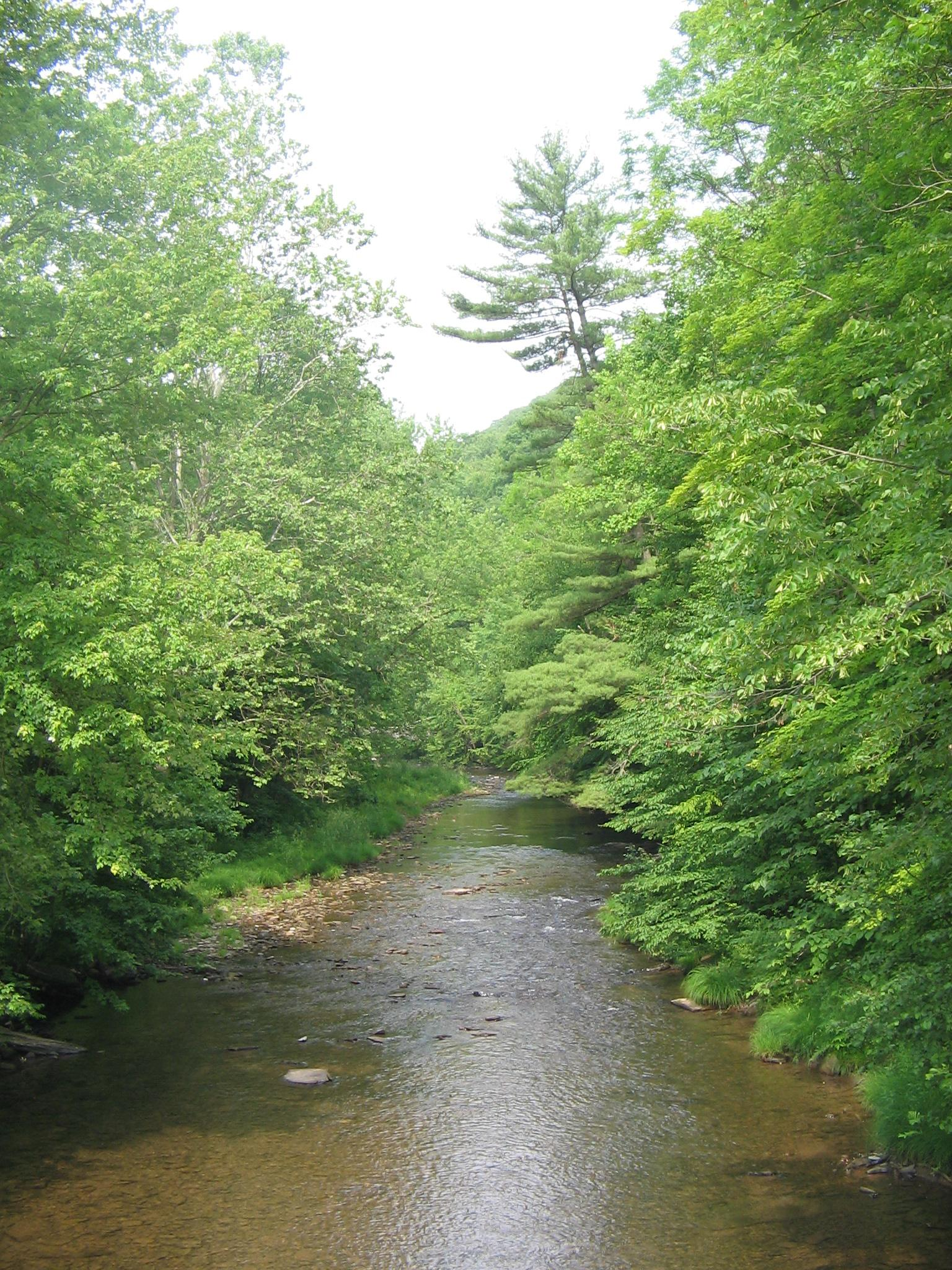
Larrys Creek in Salladasburg is state approved and stocked for trout fishing in season

There are at least two camps along Larrys Creek. "Camp Kiwanis" has a main lodge, four cabins, picnic pavilion, and various recreational facilities on 50 acres (20 ha) on Route 287, 1.0 mile (1.6 km) south of Salladasburg in Mifflin Township. It is operated as a service by the Williamsport Kiwanis and rented out for fire department training, Girl Scouts, weddings, church, and other groups. Further south along the creek in Piatt Township is the New Tribes Mission camp for preparing Christian missionaries for field work with indigenous peoples in remote parts of the world. The training at the camp lasts one year.

Edward Gertler writes in Keystone Canoeing that Larrys Creek "has an exceptionally scenic, ultra-highwater, whitewater run that is really worthy of your attention". Canoeing and kayaking on Larrys Creek are possible when the water is high enough (in Spring and after hard rain), with 8.0 miles (12.9 km) of Class 3 whitewater on the International Scale of River Difficulty from Township Road 786 south through the State Game Lands to Route 973, and 7.4 miles (11.9 km) of Class 1 to 2 whitewater south from PA 973 to U.S. 220.

In addition to the 2,881 acres (1,166 ha) in State Game Lands No. 114, opportunities for hunting and fishing are available in the areas of Tiadaghton State Forest in the western part of the watershed, along the First and Second Forks. In 2002, a Pennsylvania Department of Conservation and Natural Resources (DCNR) report on "State Forest Waters with Special Protection" rated the First Fork as a "High Quality-Cold Water Fishery". A stretch of Larrys Creek from the water company filtration plant (near the border between Mifflin and Anthony Townships) to 1.0 mile (1.6 km) downstream of the confluence with the First Fork has been designated as approved trout waters by the Pennsylvania Fish and Boat Commission. This means the waters will be stocked with trout and may be fished during trout season.

There are also private hunting and fishing clubs and cabins along Larrys Creek and its tributaries. The largest is the "Larrys Creek Fish and Game Club", incorporated August 1, 1906, which owns over 6,000 acres (2,400 ha) along Route 287 on the Second Fork. As of 2006, the club has 55 active and 15 honorary members (all male). The club promotes conservation and stocks its 7 miles (11 km) of trout stream with three to four thousand brook and brown trout each year. The club's facilities include a trapshooting range and a helipad, to aid in medical evacuations from its remote location.

Another large private club is the Ogontz Lodge on the First Fork, established by banker Jay Cooke about 1884 for fishing and hunting. Cooke owned nearly the whole First Fork, 9.2 miles (14.8 km) long, with the main "Lodge" 1.2 miles (1.9 km) from the mouth, and a smaller "Upper Cabin" 5 miles (8.0 km) upstream of that. Herbert Hoover found solitude at the Ogontz Lodge as a guest of Jay Cooke III three times: in June, 1918 (just before leaving for Europe as head of the American Food Administration), mid-May, 1928 (just before his selection as the Republican presidential candidate), and finally in late May, 1930 (as President of the United States). Other notable guests at the Ogontz Lodge include Theodore Roosevelt Jr. and Katharine Hepburn, and it is still in operation as of 2007.

== History ==
=== Early inhabitants ===
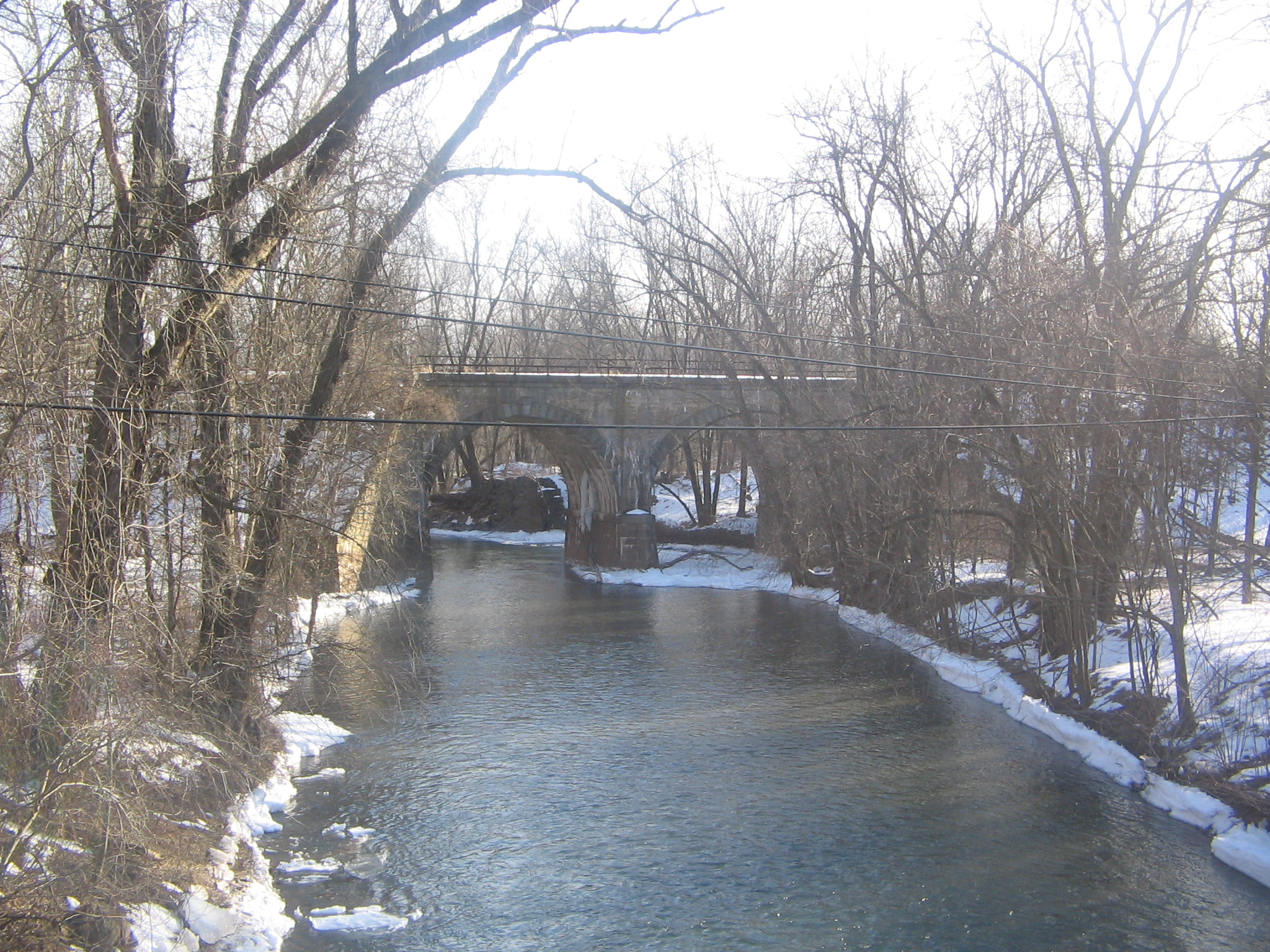
The Lycoming Valley Railroad bridge near the mouth, where the Great Shamokin Path crossed Larrys Creek and Larry Burt lived

Two Clovis points found in the Salladasburg area in a "stream site" are the earliest evidence of human activity along Larrys Creek (circa 10,000 BCE). The earliest recorded inhabitants of the Susquehanna River valley were the Iroquoian speaking Susquehannocks. Their name meant "people of the muddy river" in Algonquian. Decimated by diseases and warfare, they had died out, moved away, or been assimilated into other tribes by the early 18th century. The lands of the West Branch Susquehanna River Valley were then chiefly occupied by the Munsee phratry of the Lenape (or Delaware), and were under the nominal control of the Five (later Six) Nations of the Iroquois. The Great Shamokin Path crossed the creek at a ford near its mouth; however, no trails of the indigenous peoples are recorded as having followed Larrys Creek north.

On November 5, 1768, the British acquired the "New Purchase" from the Iroquois in the Treaty of Fort Stanwix, opening what is now Lycoming County to settlement. However, the Line of Property (or Purchase Line) border defined by "Tiadaghton Creek" dividing colonial and Native American lands was disputed. The colonists claimed this was Pine Creek, the Iroquois and other tribes that it was Lycoming Creek. Larrys Creek was in the disputed territory between these, so the illegal settlers there were part of the "Fair Play Men" system of self-government, with their own Declaration of Independence from Britain on July 4, 1776.

In the Revolutionary War, settlements throughout the Susquehanna valley were attacked by Loyalists and Native Americans allied with the British. After the Wyoming Valley battle and massacre in the summer of 1778 (near what is now Wilkes-Barre) and smaller local attacks, the "Big Runaway" occurred throughout the West Branch Susquehanna valley. Settlers fled feared and actual attacks by the British and their allies. Homes and fields were abandoned, with livestock driven along and a few possessions floated on rafts on the river east to Muncy, then further south to Sunbury. The abandoned property was burnt by the attackers. Some settlers soon returned, only to flee again in the summer of 1779 in the "Little Runaway". Sullivan's Expedition helped stabilize the area and encouraged resettlement, which continued after the war.

On April 13, 1795, Lycoming County was formed from Northumberland County, prompting further growth. In 1800, the "State Road" was the second major road built in the county and followed part of Larrys Creek in Cogan House Township as it ran from Newberry (the western part of Williamsport today) north to the Pennsylvania-New York state line near Painted Post, New York. Larrys Creek had a bridge near the mouth by 1806, the first of the major creeks in the county for which a bridge is mentioned.

=== Lumber ===
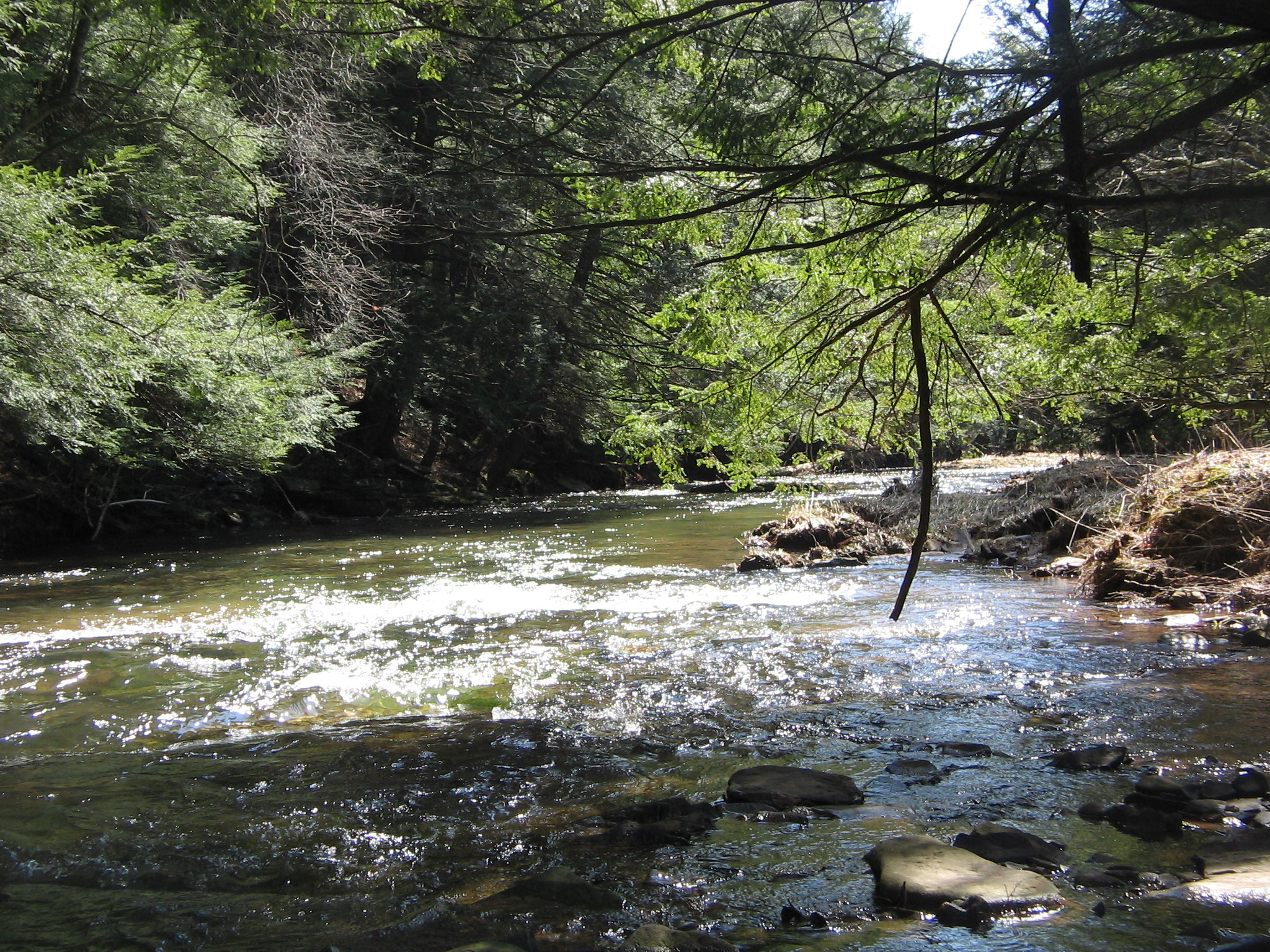
Larrys Creek in Cogan House Township, heading south through State Game Lands 114

Like all creeks in Lycoming County, Larrys Creek served as an area for settlers to establish homesteads and farms. As logging became a major industry in the mid-19th century, the creek was a source of power for sawmills and other mills. The first sawmill on the creek, in what is now Mifflin Township, was built in 1799. The relatively low flow of water in the creek did not allow rafts of logs to be floated downstream to the river and the lumber boom at Williamsport (as they were on Pine Creek to the west).

This and the lack of logging railroads along the creek led to the development of many small sawmills: the Larrys Creek watershed once had 53 sawmills within 22 miles (35 km) of the mouth (as well as other industries of the time). No other stream in the country had so many sawmills in so small a territory. Twelve sawmills were on the Second Fork, six on the First Fork, one each on Canoe Run and Lawshe Run, and the rest were on Larrys Creek itself. Eight were structures rebuilt on the site of previous sawmills, and only four were steam powered (the rest were water powered). The earliest of these sawmills was built in 1796 (near Seeley Run), the last in 1902 (on Lawshe Run), and by 1903 just two mills were still standing and only one of those was operating.

Lumbering removed the tree trunks, but left many flammable limbs, branches, and stumps behind. On May 2, 1872, a large forest fire destroyed the villages of Carter and Gould, 6 miles (9.7 km) north of Salladasburg on Larrys Creek in Mifflin Township. There are large tracts of second growth forest and small lumber companies still operate in the watershed today.

=== Paper railroads ===
Two "paper railroads" were proposed for Larrys Creek: the "Larry's Creek Railroad and Coal Company", incorporated June 24, 1839 to hold 2,000 acres (8.1 km^{2}) and operate up to 7 miles (11 km) of railroad from the mouth of the creek north to the coal mines; and the "Jersey Shore, Pine Creek & State Line Railroad", incorporated on April 11, 1853, to run north from Jersey Shore up Pine Creek to Tioga or Long Run, and thence to the New York state line. Its charter was amended April 4, 1854 to run up Marsh Creek (then known as the Third Fork Pine Creek) and Crooked Creek to the Tioga Railroad, and again on March 26, 1856, to run up Little Pine Creek (then known as First Fork Pine Creek) to the Larrys Creek Plank Road and then up Blockhouse Creek to Blossburg. It was still an active corporation in 1865, but the charter of the "Jersey Shore, Pine Creek and Buffalo Railway" in 1870 (New York City-Reading interests) superseded it. Neither railroad was actually ever built. The only railroad in the watershed is the Lycoming Valley Railroad, which runs parallel to the river and crosses the creek just north of the mouth.

=== Plank road ===
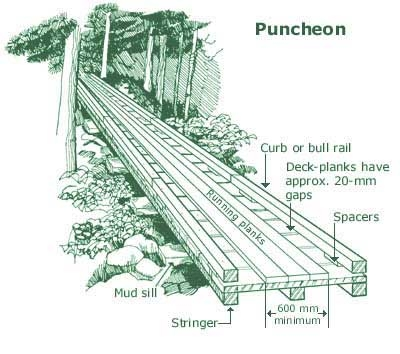
Diagram of a plank road or puncheon

In 1851 a plank road or puncheon was built along Larrys Creek from the village of Larrys Creek at the creek's mouth north to Salladasburg, then later along the Second Fork and on to the village of Brookside in Cogan House Township. It was later extended north to the village of White Pine and finally to the village of English Center in Pine Township (along the current course of Pennsylvania Route 287). A spur of the plank road along Larrys Creek into Anthony Township was also built, but it is not known how far it extended. (Landis claims it may have run nearly as far north as the covered bridge in Cogan House Township). The plank road was a toll road run by "The Larrys Creek Plank Road Company", a corporation founded May 8, 1850. It served the sawmills, grist mills, mines, and leather tanneries along the creek. There was a connection to the railroad and the West Branch Division of the Pennsylvania Canal at the hamlet of Larrys Creek, as well as the West Branch Susquehanna River.

Hemlock logs were used to build the plank road. At that time, the tree's bark was a major source of tannin used to tan leather. The wood was not used much for lumber, so hundreds of thousands of stripped hemlock logs were normally left to rot. There were sawmills and experienced lumber workers available from the local timber industry.

The earth under the plank road was first graded, then ties (similar to those used for railroad tracks) were set into the ground. Next long narrow stringers (similar to rails on a railroad track) were nailed to the ties, with a distance between stringers of about 6 feet (1.8 m). The road surface consisted of planks about 8 feet (2.4 m) wide nailed to the stringers and was fairly smooth. The road had turnoffs (as it was not wide enough for horse-drawn vehicles to pass each other). Toll houses were at regular intervals, with variable tolls for pedestrians, riders on horseback and various carts and wagons. No toll schedule has survived.

The plank road was operational for about 38 years when a major flood on June 1, 1889, washed out much of it. The flood also destroyed the canal at the creek's mouth. The same storm system caused the Johnstown Flood, which killed over 2200 people. The Cogan House Covered Bridge was the only one on Larrys Creek to survive the flood, as a fallen tree formed a protective dam just upstream. The 90 feet (27 m) long Burr arch truss bridge was built in 1877, listed on the National Register of Historic Places in 1980, rehabilitated in 1998, and is today one of just three left in the county.

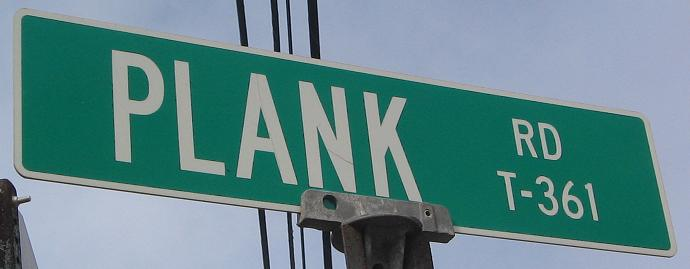
Today, the name is all that remains of the Larrys Creek Plank Road

By then most of the original forests in the county had been clear-cut, so no cheap source of wood was available as before. While the road from Salladasburg south to the West Branch Susquehanna River was repaired and rebuilt, the rest was not. In 1900 the county courts recognized a petition to end tolls on this last portion of the road. The corporation was dissolved and the road and its maintenance passed to the county. As sections of plank road wore out they were replaced by graded dirt and gravel, so that it soon became a regular road. The plank road operated as a toll road for about 49 years. Today only the "Plank Road" name survives, in a 0.6 miles (0.97 km) section of road that runs north from U.S. Route 220, parallel to Route 287.

== See also ==
- List of rivers of Pennsylvania
