= Cogan House Township, Lycoming County, Pennsylvania =

Township in Pennsylvania, US

Cogan House Township, Pennsylvania
- Township
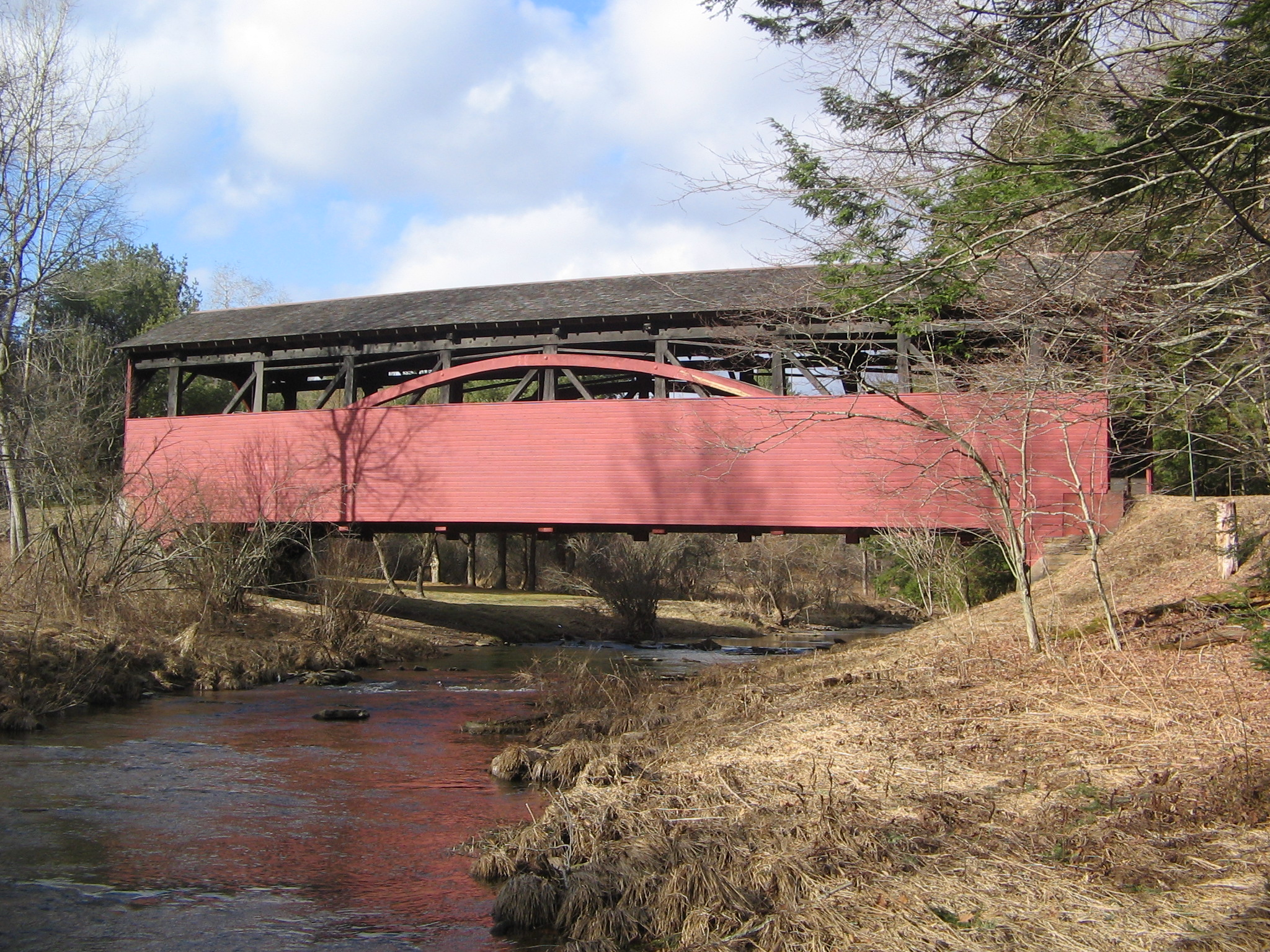
- Cogan House Covered Bridge over Larrys Creek in Cogan House Township

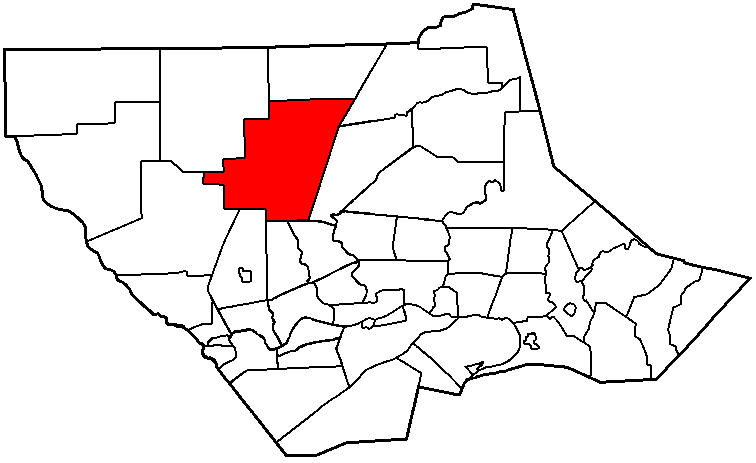
- Map of Lycoming County, Pennsylvania highlighting Cogan House Township

- Map of Lycoming County, Pennsylvania
- Coordinates: 41°24′57″N 77°11′21″W
- Country: United States
- State: Pennsylvania
- County: Lycoming
- Settled: 1825
- Incorporated: 1843

Area
  - Total: 69.98 sq mi (181.26 km^{2})
  - Land: 69.92 sq mi (181.09 km^{2})
  - Water: 0.069 sq mi (0.18 km^{2})
- Elevation: 1,273 ft (388 m)

Population (2020)
  - Total: 930 ▼
  - Estimate (2021): 928
  - Density: 13.4/sq mi (5.19/km^{2})
- Time zone: UTC-5 (Eastern Time Zone (North America))
  - Summer (DST): UTC-4 (EDT)
- ZIP code: 17771
- Area code: 570
- FIPS code: 42-081-14872
- GNIS feature ID: 1216745
- Website: coganhousetwp.org

Cogan House Township is a township in Lycoming County, Pennsylvania, United States. The population was 930 at the 2020 census. It is part of the Williamsport, Pennsylvania Metropolitan Statistical Area.

== History ==
Cogan House Township was formed from parts of Jackson and Mifflin townships on December 6, 1843.

The source of Larrys Creek is in Cogan House Township, just south of the hamlet of Steam Valley. It flows west-southwest through the village of Cogan House, and then under the Cogan House Covered Bridge. The bridge is also known as the "Buckhorn Covered Bridge" (for a nearby mountain and vanished village) or the "Larrys Creek Covered Bridge" (for the creek it crosses). A petition from the citizens of Cogan House Township for a bridge to be built was filed on September 4, 1876. The 90-foot-long (27 m) Burr arch truss bridge was built in 1877 and rehabilitated in 1998, and is on the National Register of Historic Places. Larrys Creek was vitally important to the economic development of Cogan House Township. During the height of the lumber era that swept through Pennsylvania in the mid-to-late 19th century, the creek was used to float logs from the hills of the township to the lumber industry in nearby Williamsport on the West Branch Susquehanna River.

The township is named for David Cogan, a pioneer who settled on Larrys Creek in 1825. Cogan was one of the few settlers in the area for many years, but wearying of his isolation, he left his homestead in 1842, as did a neighbor named Carter. Cogan's and Carter's houses were used by hunters and travellers. The name "Cogan's House" was given to the area and then to the township.

In the spring of 1843, the following men were the first officials named to run the township: Justice of the Peace-Joseph Stryker; Supervisors-John Aikin and G. Botts; School Directors-Joseph Stryker, John Weigel, Benjamin Quimby, Paul Stryker, Charles Straub, and G. Botts. Descendants of some of these men still live in the township.

The area was home to fine timber and an abundance of game in the 1800s. The township became one of the best lumbering districts in the county and soon sawmills began to spring up. James Wood, Isaiah Hayes, F. Whitlock and Mr. Schuyler operated some of the earliest local mills.

The virgin trees that once covered these hills were harvested to feed the lumber mills of Williamsport. However, by the early 1900s only stumps from the giant trees remained. The land no longer held economic interest for the lumber barons. Many of the men who came to work in the woods and at the sawmills had married and created families while living in the township. Some decided to stay on and try their hand at subsistence farming. Slowly, the family farm took root in the sawdust left behind by the woodcutters.

The settlements at Brookside, White Pine, Cogan House, Beech Grove, Green Mountain, Steam Valley and on Buckhorn Mountain took shape. Many grew into villages where a horse could be shod, supplies bought at the general store, mail and newspapers picked up, a vote cast at election time and gossip exchanged. Churches and schools were built to accommodate the spiritual and educational needs of the community.

By 1900 Cogan House Township was home to five churches, five post offices, seven schools, two general stores and a thriving population. During the 20th century this mostly agrarian society was redefined through war, modern transportation, better roads, advanced communication systems, the lure of higher wages in far away places, and the consolidation of schools and churches. The township population decreased to 521 as of the 1970 census and has since climbed back to over 900.

== Geography ==
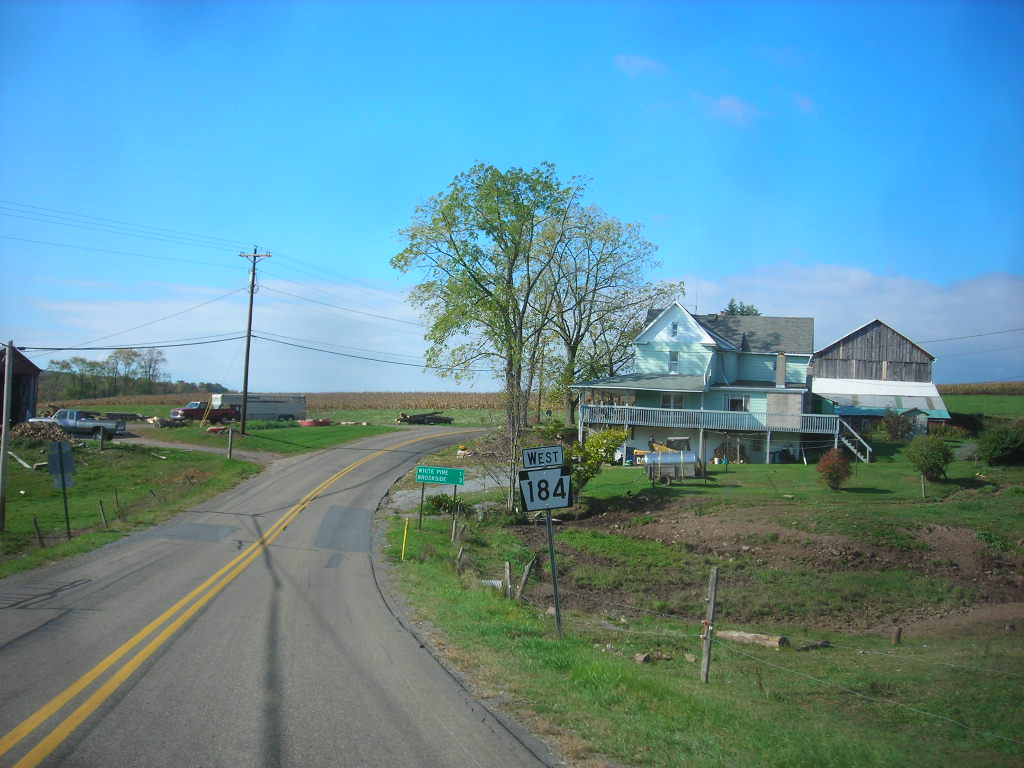
Route 184 heading westbound through Beech Grove

Cogan House Township is in north-central Lycoming County and is bordered by Cummings Townships to the southwest, Pine Township to the northwest, Jackson Township to the north, McIntyre Township to the northeast, Lewis Township to the east, Lycoming Township to the southeast, and Anthony and Mifflin townships to the south. U.S. Route 15, the Appalachian Thruway, crosses the northeastern part of the township, with interchanges at Green Mountain Road and Pennsylvania Route 184. US-15 leads south 22 miles (35 km) to Williamsport, the county seat, and north 28 miles (45 km) to Mansfield. PA-184 is entirely in the township, leading from US-15 at Steam Valley in the northeast to Pennsylvania Route 287 at Brookside in the west. PA-287 leads north 27 miles (43 km) to U.S. Route 6 at Wellsboro and south 12 miles (19 km) to U.S. Route 220 at the West Branch Susquehanna River.

According to the United States Census Bureau, the township has a total area of 70.0 square miles (181.3 km^{2}), of which 69.9 square miles (181.1 km^{2}) are land and 0.1 square miles (0.2 km^{2}), or 0.10%, are water. Larrys Creek rises near Steam Valley and proceeds southwestward through the township on its 25-mile (40 km) journey to the West Branch of the Susquehanna. A number of other streams meander through the township as well. Hoagland Run, in the southeastern part of the township, flows southeastward to Lycoming Creek, another tributary of the West Branch. A few small streams such as Flicks Run and Bear Run in the northwestern part of the township flow northwestward to Pine Creek, yet another West Branch tributary.

== Demographics ==
Historical population
Census	Pop.	Note	%±
1900	1,142		—
1910	885		−22.5%
1920	630		−28.8%
1930	516		−18.1%
1940	609		18.0%
1950	610		0.2%
1960	633		3.8%
1970	521		−17.7%
1980	819		57.2%
1990	807		−1.5%
2000	974		20.7%
2010	955		−2.0%
2020	930		−2.6%
2021 (est.)	928		−0.2%
U.S. Decennial Census

As of the census of 2000, there were 974 people, 359 households, and 273 families residing in the township. The population density was 13.9 people per square mile (5.4/km^{2}). There were 451 housing units at an average density of 6.5/sq mi (2.5/km^{2}). The racial makeup of the township was 99.38% White, 0.10% African American, 0.10% Native American, 0.10% from other races, and 0.31% from two or more races. Hispanic or Latino of any race were 0.51% of the population.

There were 359 households, out of which 29.8% had children under the age of 18 living with them, 68.0% were married couples living together, 4.7% had a female householder with no husband present, and 23.7% were non-families. 18.1% of all households were made up of individuals, and 7.5% had someone living alone who was 65 years of age or older. The average household size was 2.66 and the average family size was 3.08.

In the township the population was spread out, with 24.9% under the age of 18, 7.6% from 18 to 24, 26.9% from 25 to 44, 27.9% from 45 to 64, and 12.6% who were 65 years of age or older. The median age was 39 years. For every 100 females there were 102.5 males. For every 100 females age 18 and over, there were 103.6 males.

The median income for a household in the township was $36,172, and the median income for a family was $40,192. Males had a median income of $31,875 versus $20,350 for females. The per capita income for the township was $15,345. About 8.0% of families and 9.5% of the population were below the poverty line, including 10.3% of those under age 18 and 9.7% of those age 65 or over.
