= Anthony Township, Lycoming County, Pennsylvania =

Township in Pennsylvania, US

- Township
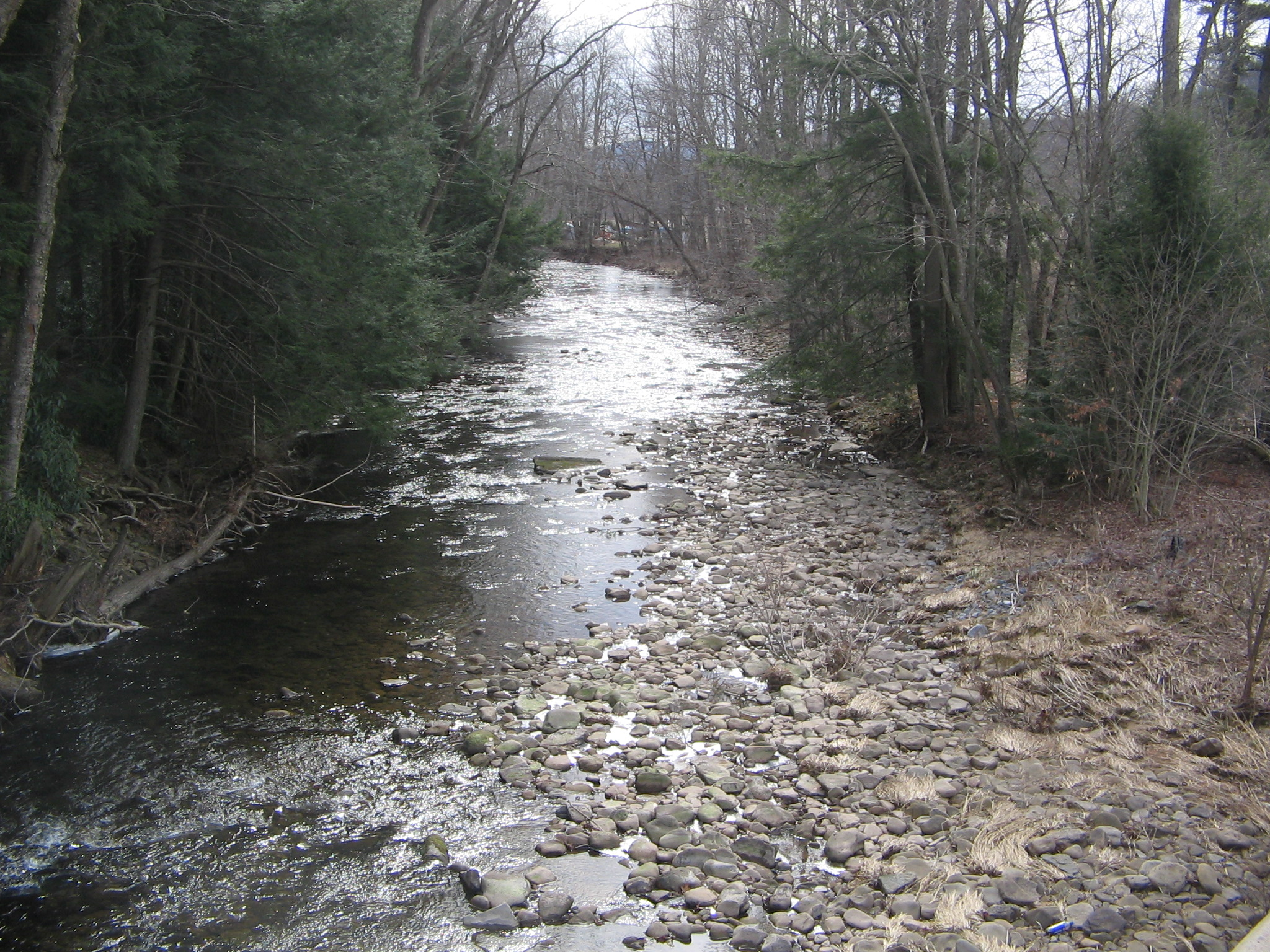
- Larrys Creek passing through Anthony Township

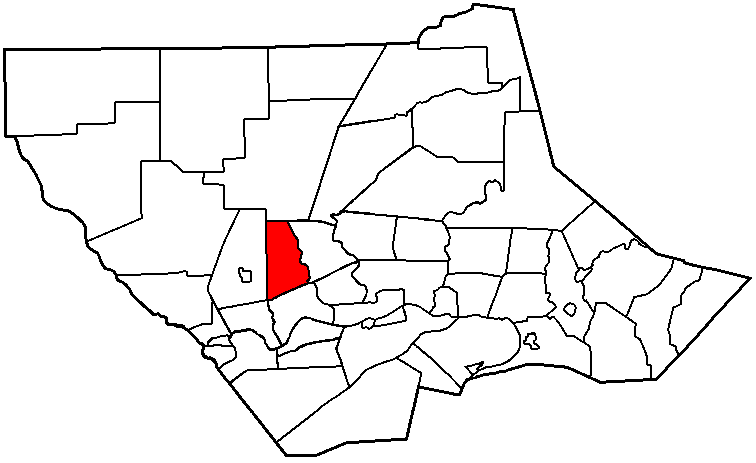
- Map of Lycoming County, Pennsylvania, highlighting Anthony Township

- Map of Lycoming County, Pennsylvania
- Coordinates: 41°17′29″N 77°10′16″W
- Country: United States
- State: Pennsylvania
- County: Lycoming
- Settled: 1770
- Formed: 1844

Area
  - Total: 15.59 sq mi (40.39 km^{2})
  - Land: 15.56 sq mi (40.30 km^{2})
  - Water: 0.035 sq mi (0.09 km^{2})
- Elevation: 1,066 ft (325 m)

Population (2020)
  - Total: 866 ▲
  - Estimate (2021): 861
  - Density: 56.3/sq mi (21.74/km^{2})
- Time zone: UTC-5 (Eastern Time Zone (North America))
  - Summer (DST): UTC-4 (EDT)
- FIPS code: 42-081-02656
- GNIS feature ID: 1216738

Anthony Township is a township in Lycoming County, Pennsylvania, United States. The population was 866 at the 2020 census. It is part of the Williamsport, Pennsylvania Metropolitan Statistical Area.

== History ==
Anthony Township was formed from part of Lycoming Township on September 7, 1844, by the Court of Quarter Sessions of the Peace of Lycoming County. It is named in honor of Joseph B. Anthony, who was a judge in Lycoming County at the time.

When colonial settlers first arrived in what is now Anthony Township, they were outside the western boundary of what was then the Province of Pennsylvania. These settlers were not under the jurisdiction or protection of any type from any of the Thirteen Colonies. They became known as the Fair Play Men. These men established their own form of government, known as the "Fair Play System", with three elected commissioners who ruled on land claims and other issues for the group. In a remarkable coincidence, the Fair Play Men made their own Declaration of Independence from Britain on July 4, 1776, beneath the "Tiadaghton Elm" on the banks of Pine Creek.

A German Baptist congregation was incorporated on February 8, 1879, under the title of the "German Baptist Church of Anthony Township". It was one of the first German Baptist churches founded in America, along with two other churches in Lycoming County, one on Blooming Grove Road north of Williamsport and the other in Fairfield Township near Montoursville. These churches were more commonly known as the Dunker or Dunkard Churches for their practice of immersing believers three times, once each in the names of the Father, of the Son, and of the Holy Spirit.

A spur of the plank road along Larrys Creek was built into Anthony Township, but it is not known how far it extended. (Landis claims it may have run nearly as far north as the covered bridge in Cogan House Township).

== Geography ==
Anthony Township is bordered by Cogan House Township to the north, Lycoming Township to the east, Woodward Township to the south and Mifflin Township to the west. By road, Anthony Township is about 10 miles (16 km) northwest of Williamsport, 170 miles (270 km) northwest of Philadelphia and 190 miles (310 km) east-northeast of Pittsburgh.

According to the United States Census Bureau, the township has a total area of 15.6 square miles (40 km^{2}), of which 0.03 square miles (0.08 km^{2}), or 0.22%, are water. The northeastern part of the township is drained by Stony Run, an eastward-flowing tributary of Hoaglund Run, which runs east to Lycoming Creek, a southward-flowing tributary of the West Branch of the Susquehanna River. The remainder of the township is drained by direct southward-flowing tributaries of the West Branch: Larrys Creek in the northwest, Pine Run in the southwest, and Quenshukeny Run in the southeast.

== Demographics ==
Historical population
Census	Pop.	Note	%±
2010	865		—
2020	866		0.1%
2021 (est.)	861		−0.6%
U.S. Decennial Census

As of the census of 2000, there were 904 people, 306 households, and 260 families residing in the township. The population density was 57.0 inhabitants per square mile (22.0/km^{2}). There were 319 housing units at an average density of 20.1/sq mi (7.8/km^{2}). The racial makeup of the township was 99.45% White, 0.33% Asian, and 0.22% from two or more races. Hispanic or Latino of any race were 0.44% of the population.

There were 306 households, out of which 37.3% had children under the age of 18 living with them, 77.1% were married couples living together, 5.6% had a female householder with no husband present, and 15.0% were non-families. 10.1% of all households were made up of individuals, and 4.2% had someone living alone who was 65 years of age or older. The average household size was 2.95 and the average family size was 3.19.

In the township the population was spread out, with 27.0% under the age of 18, 7.4% from 18 to 24, 32.9% from 25 to 44, 23.5% from 45 to 64, and 9.3% who were 65 years of age or older. The median age was 37 years. For every 100 females there were 108.3 males. For every 100 females age 18 and over, there were 108.2 males.

The median income for a household in the township was $44,583, and the median income for a family was $47,431. Males had a median income of $32,875 versus $20,096 for females. The per capita income for the township was $15,932. About 5.8% of families and 7.2% of the population were below the poverty line, including 7.6% of those under age 18 and 17.6% of those age 65 or over.
