= Piatt Township, Pennsylvania =

Township in Pennsylvania, US

Piatt Township, Lycoming County, Pennsylvania
- Township
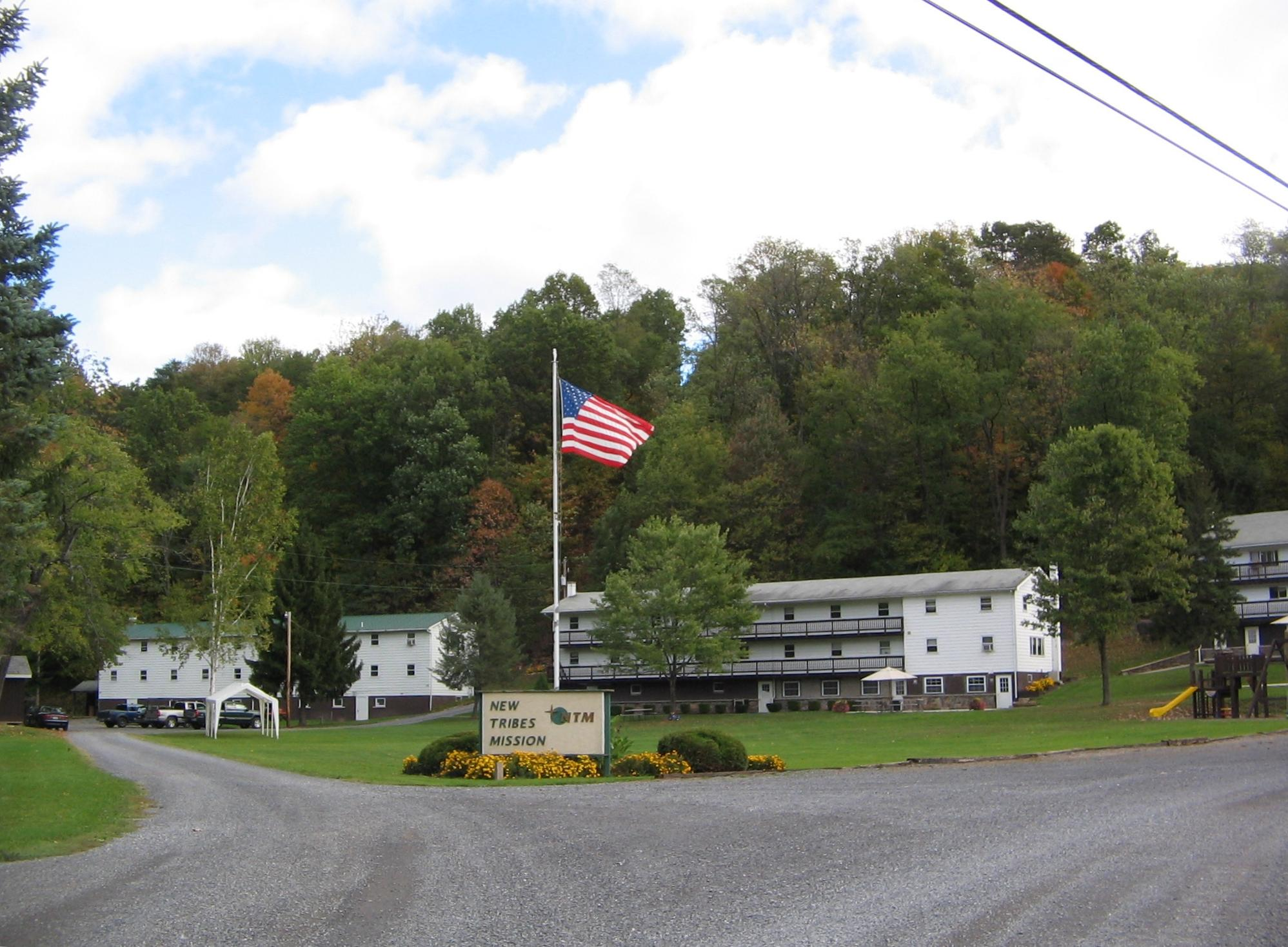
- New Tribes Mission Camp along Larrys Creek in Piatt Township

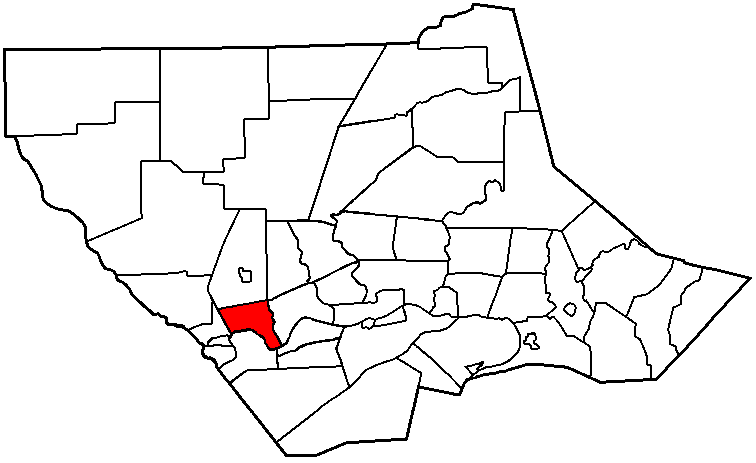
- Map of Lycoming County, Pennsylvania highlighting Piatt Township

- Map of Lycoming County, Pennsylvania
- Coordinates: 41°13′12″N 77°13′8″W
- Country: United States
- State: Pennsylvania
- County: Lycoming
- Settled: 1769
- Incorporated: 1857

Area
  - Total: 10.09 sq mi (26.14 km^{2})
  - Land: 9.77 sq mi (25.31 km^{2})
  - Water: 0.32 sq mi (0.83 km^{2})
- Elevation: 571 ft (174 m)

Population (2020)
  - Total: 1,045 ▼
  - Estimate (2021): 1,039
  - Density: 118/sq mi (45.6/km^{2})
- Time zone: UTC-5 (Eastern (EST))
  - Summer (DST): UTC-4 (EDT)
- ZIP code: 17740
- Area code: 570
- FIPS code: 42-081-60128
- GNIS feature ID: 1216768
- Website: piatttownship.org

Piatt Township (/ˈpaɪ.ət/ PY-ət) is a township in Lycoming County, Pennsylvania, United States. The population was 1,045 at the 2020 census. It is part of the Williamsport Metropolitan Statistical Area.

== History ==
Piatt Township was formed from part of Mifflin Township by the Court of Quarter Sessions of the Peace of Lycoming County on April 30, 1857. The new township encompassed what was the southernmost part of Mifflin Township. Piatt Township is named for William Piatt, an associate judge in Lycoming County when the township was created.

When colonial settlers first arrived in what is now Piatt Township they were outside the western boundary of what was then the Province of Pennsylvania. These settlers were not under the jurisdiction or protection of any type from any of the Thirteen Colonies. They became known as the Fair Play Men. These men established their own form of government, known as the "Fair Play System", with three elected commissioners who ruled on land claims and other issues for the group. In a remarkable coincidence, the Fair Play Men made their own Declaration of Independence from Britain on July 4, 1776, beneath the "Tiadaghton Elm" on the banks of Pine Creek.

In the American Revolutionary War, settlements throughout the Susquehanna valley, including Piatt Township, were attacked by Loyalists and Native Americans allied with the British. After the Wyoming Valley battle and massacre in the summer of 1778 (near what is now Wilkes-Barre) and smaller local attacks, the "Big Runaway" occurred throughout the West Branch Susquehanna valley. Settlers fled feared and actual attacks by the British and their allies. Homes and fields were abandoned, with livestock driven along and a few possessions floated on rafts on the river east to Muncy, then further south to Sunbury. The abandoned property was burnt by the attackers. Some settlers soon returned, only to flee again in the summer of 1779 in the "Little Runaway". Sullivan's Expedition helped stabilize the area and encouraged resettlement, which continued after the war.

Larrys Creek, which bisects Piatt Township, is named for Larry Burt, the first settler in the area, who lived near the mouth of the creek near what is now the hamlet of Larrys Creek. He traded with the indigenous peoples and according to tradition had a Native American wife. Burt was already there when surveyors came through in 1769 (after the land was purchased in the first Treaty of Fort Stanwix), but disappeared sometime soon after, perhaps moving west with the Native Americans who left the area.

Other settlers soon followed Burt to what is now Piatt Township. They settled along the banks of Larrys Creek near where the creek flows into the West Branch Susquehanna River. Peter Duffy was one of the most prominent of the early settlers. He settled with his family at the mouth of Larrys Creek in August 1784. Duffy's journey from County Kildare, Ireland, was a long and difficult struggle. He left from Dublin in July 1775 during the early years of the American Revolution. Duffy was an acquaintance of Major John Pitcairn. Pitcairn was with the Royal Marines and was part of the British force that was occupying Boston at the outset of the Revolution. Pitcairn was killed at the Battle of Bunker Hill. This left Duffy without a point of contact in the Thirteen Colonies.

Duffy and his family landed in Philadelphia in August 1775. After a short stay in the Philadelphia area, he and his family moved further inland to Lancaster County. The family spent seven years in the Lancaster area before moving to Coxestown, now known as Susquehanna Township, just north of Harrisburg in Dauphin County. The Duffys owned a home along the banks of the Susquehanna River for about a year before it was flooded and accidentally burned in the winter of 1784. Duffy did not lot this stop him. He gathered his family and migrated further still into the Pennsylvania frontier. The Duffy family was joined by the Stewart family on their trip from Dauphin County to Lycoming County. Both families settled down to the east of what is now Jersey Shore. The Stewarts settled on the southern side of the West Branch Susquehanna River in Nippenose Township and the Duffys settled on the opposite shore in Piatt Township.

Duffy built his home near where the Great Shamokin Path crossed Larrys Creek. This path became an important road in the settlement of the West Branch Susquehanna Valley. Early pioneers trekked up the road as they continued to move ever westward. Duffy opened an inn that soon became an important stopping point for the pioneers. Duffy was unable to enjoy his prominence for very long. Late one evening, a pack of wolves attacked him along the Great Shamokin Path, and while he fended them off and returned home, he was weakened by the cold and the effort of defending himself. He came down with a severe and fatal cold.

Duffy's widow Martha was left to manage the inn with the help of her children, whose numbers were soon reduced by the February 1807 death of their firstborn son James in an accident at a wedding party at Culbertson's Mill in Duboistown. Martha Duffy was left with her four remaining children. Her second daughter, Catharine, had married and moved with her husband to Meadville in Crawford County. The oldest daughter, Mary Ann, took over management of the inn. Bernard operated the family owned sawmill on Pine Creek, Margaret managed the Duffy family home, and Peter, the son, managed the family farm. These four Duffy children never married and spent the rest of their lives living together in the family home in Piatt Township.

The area of land along the West Branch and Larrys Creek was previously known as "Level Corner". Many of the early settlers were attracted to this area of fertile farmland. Isaac Smith migrated to Piatt Township from Chester County. Smith was a millwright and farmer. Robert Covenhoven was another prominent early settler. He was a veteran of the American Revolution, having fought at the battles of Trenton and Princeton. Covenhoven had returned to the West Branch Valley just before the Big Runaway. Upon hearing of the approaching raiding Indians and Loyalist, Covenhoven rode west along the ridge of Bald Eagle Mountain to warn settlers at Fort Antes (opposite what is now Jersey Shore) and the western part of the valley. Covenhoven is listed as a Fair Play Man and one of the signers of the Tiadaghton Declaration of Independence. Following the Great Runaway, Covenhoven continued to serve as a scout for the Patriot forces on the Pennsylvania frontier. At the conclusion of the war he settled with his wife at Level Corner. They raised a family of three sons and five daughters. Covenhoven lived to the age of 90 and is buried in Northumberland, where he went to live with his daughter Nancy after his wife Mercy's death.

== Geography ==
Piatt Township is in western Lycoming County and is bordered by Mifflin Township to the north, Anthony Township at the northeastern corner, Woodward Township to the east, the West Branch Susquehanna River to the south, and Porter Township to the west. U.S. Route 220 crosses the southern part of the township, passing through the hamlet of Larrys Creek, leading east 12 miles (19 km) to Williamsport and southwest 14 miles (23 km) to Lock Haven. Pennsylvania Route 287 begins at US-220 at Larrys Creek and leads north 4 miles (6 km) to Salladasburg, passing through Larryville in the northern part of the township.

According to the United States Census Bureau, Piatt Township has a total area of 10.1 square miles (26.1 km^{2}), of which 9.8 square miles (25.3 km^{2}) are land and 0.3 square miles (0.8 km^{2}), or 3.17%, are water. Larrys Creek crosses the center of the township, joining the West Branch Susquehanna River at the township's southern border. Stewards Run drains the western part of the township, flowing directly to the West Branch, and Pine Run and its tributary Little Pine Run form the township's eastern border, with Pine Run also flowing directly to the West Branch.

== Demographics ==
Historical population
Census	Pop.	Note	%±
2010	1,180		—
2020	1,045		−11.4%
2021 (est.)	1,039		−0.6%
U.S. Decennial Census

As of the census of 2000, there were 1,259 people, 453 households, and 331 families residing in the township. The population density was 127.8 inhabitants per square mile (49.3/km^{2}). There were 511 housing units at an average density of 51.9 per square mile (20.0/km^{2}). The racial makeup of the township was 99.21% White, 0.08% African American, 0.32% Asian, and 0.40% from two or more races. Hispanic or Latino of any race were 0.16% of the population.

There were 453 households, out of which 36.2% had children under the age of 18 living with them, 59.6% were married couples living together, 8.8% had a female householder with no husband present, and 26.9% were non-families. 21.0% of all households were made up of individuals, and 8.4% had someone living alone who was 65 years of age or older. The average household size was 2.66 and the average family size was 3.10.

In the township the population was spread out, with 26.8% under the age of 18, 8.4% from 18 to 24, 34.6% from 25 to 44, 19.0% from 45 to 64, and 11.1% who were 65 years of age or older. The median age was 35 years. For every 100 females there were 99.5 males. For every 100 females age 18 and over, there were 101.1 males.

The median income for a household in the township was $37,596, and the median income for a family was $41,842. Males had a median income of $31,101 versus $20,052 for females. The per capita income for the township was $15,842. About 8.2% of families and 8.4% of the population were below the poverty line, including 6.1% of those under age 18 and 8.0% of those age 65 or over.
