= West Branch Susquehanna Valley =

Low-lying area in central Pennsylvania, USA

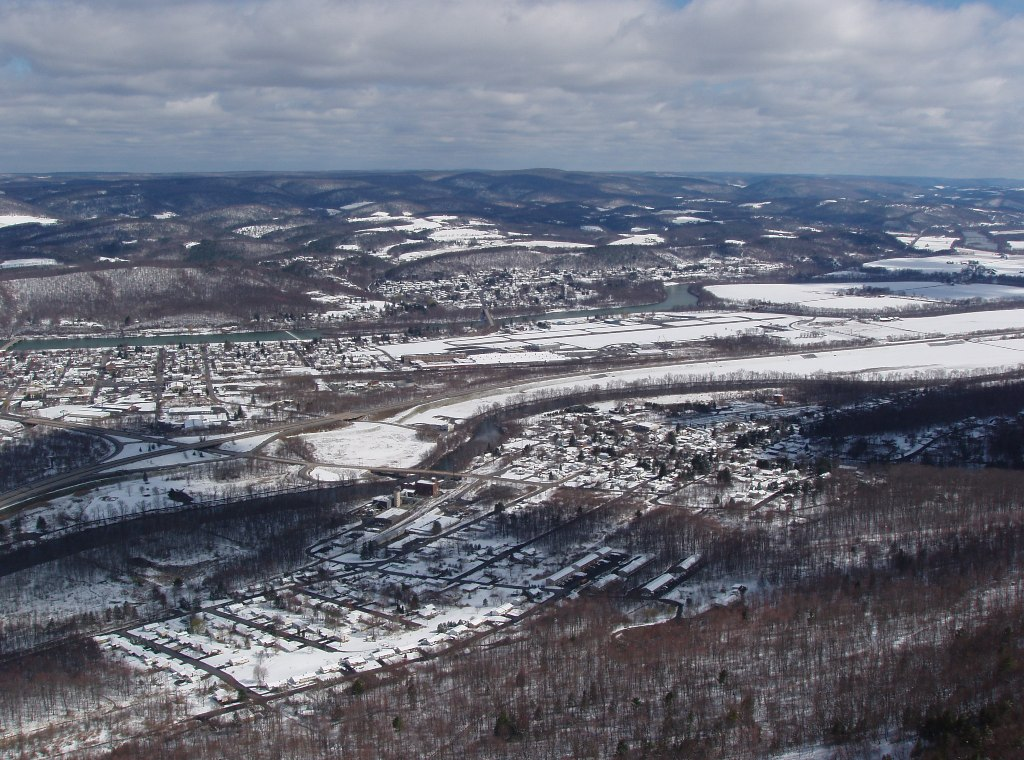
The West Branch Susquehanna Valley looking north from above the Bald Eagle Mountain ridge with Castanea and Bald Eagle Creek (in foreground) and Lock Haven, William T. Piper Memorial Airport, the West Branch Susquehanna River, and the foothills of the Allegheny Front (in background)

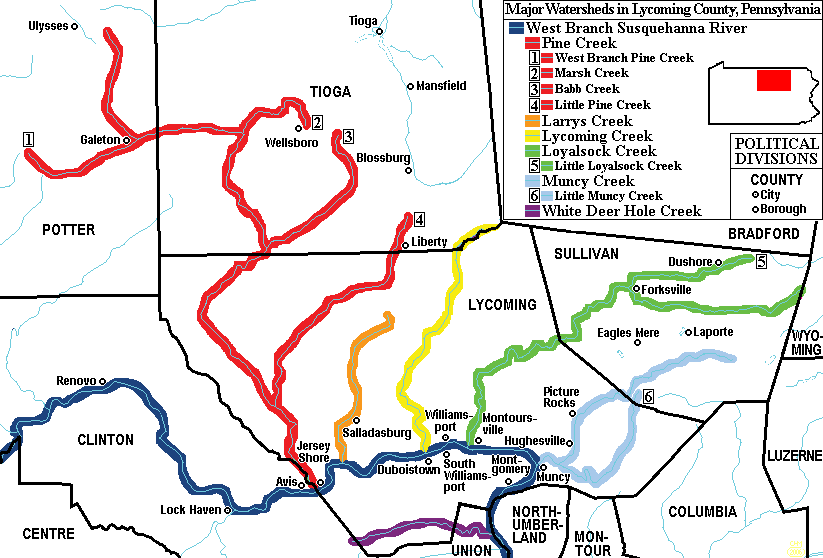
Map of the West Branch Susquehanna River (dark blue) and major streams in the West Branch Susquehanna Valley

The West Branch Susquehanna Valley of central Pennsylvania, United States, in the Ridge-and-valley Appalachians, is the low-lying area draining into the West Branch Susquehanna River southeast of the Allegheny Front, northeast of the Bald Eagle Valley, southwest of the Wyoming Valley and north of the water gap formed between Shamokin Mountain and Montour Ridge.

The river enters the valley after emerging from a deep gorge in the Allegheny Plateau above Lock Haven, then turns east entering a broad alluvial flood plain, where it receives the Bald Eagle Creek after passing the town. The flood plain lies at the foot of the Bald Eagle Mountain ridge, with large fertile farm fields in and around the river's meanders and islands. The valley above the flood plain is a series of knolls below the plateau. Further down the valley, the river receives Pine Creek which has also entered the valley from a deep gorge, Pine Creek Gorge (also known as the Grand Canyon of Pennsylvania). East of Williamsport, the Bald Eagle ridge ends, the river turns south, and the valley opens up and follows the river to the water gap at Lewisburg.

In Clinton and Lycoming Counties, it is northeast of the Bald Eagle Valley and runs from Lock Haven to Williamsport.

== History ==
The lands along the West Branch were vital hunting grounds and agricultural lands for Native Americans. During Pennsylvania's great lumbering era, the most significant log drive was conveyed on the West Branch of the Susquehanna River. The Susquehanna's West Branch Canal Division further shaped the corridor, linking towns and villages and providing vital opportunities for commerce. Finally, railroads in the corridor fused the links between communities and commerce within the corridor.

=== Otstonwakin ===
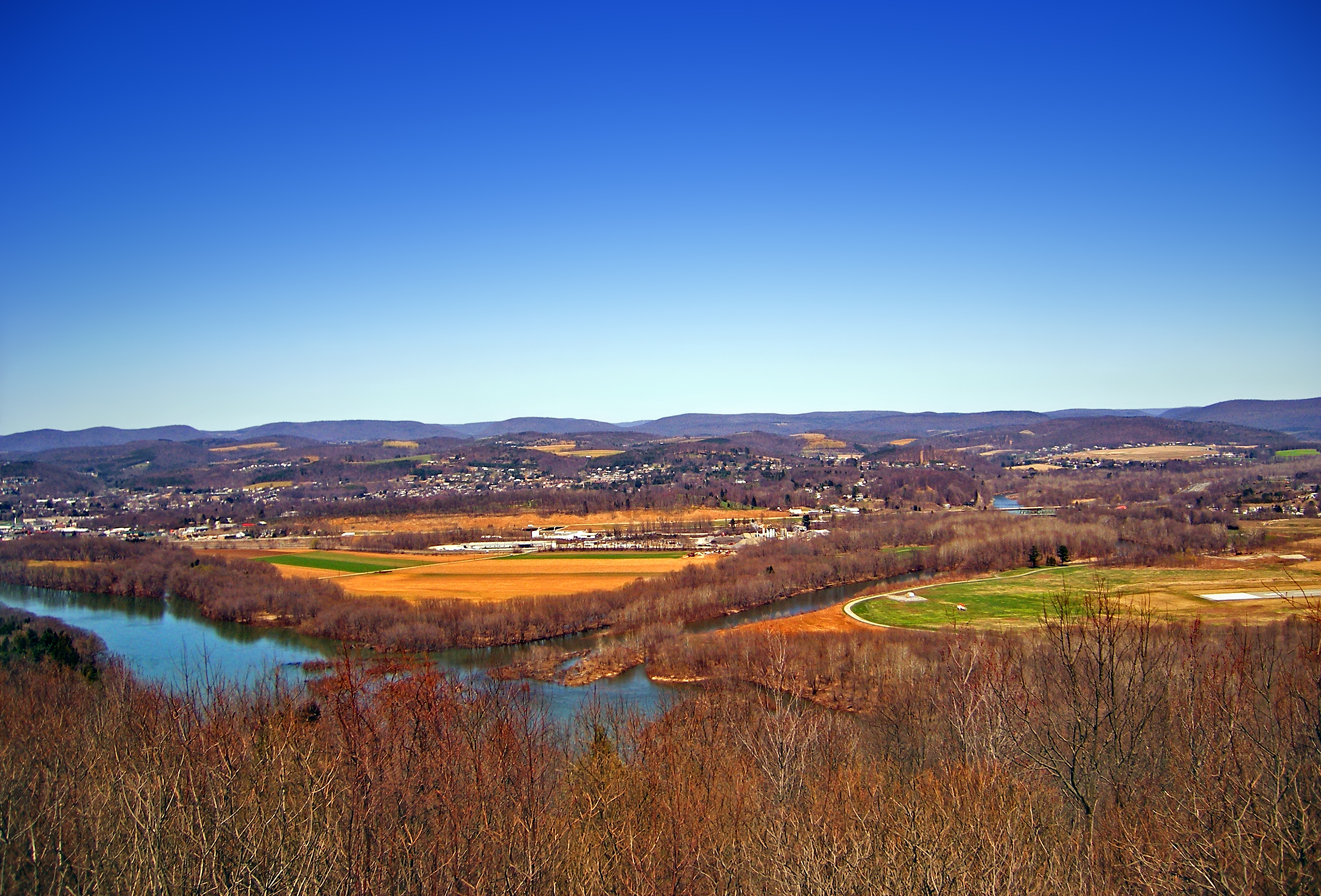
Madame Mountour's was located at the mouth of Loyalsock Creek on the west branch of the Susquehanna River

Madame Montour's village of Otstonwakin or Ostuagy was a vitally important location during the settlement of what is now Lycoming County. Her village at the mouth of Loyalsock Creek on the West Branch Susquehanna River was an important stopping point for the Moravian missionaries who were spreading the gospel throughout the wilderness of Pennsylvania during the 1740s. Count Zinzendorf, a missionary being guided by Conrad Weiser with the permission of Shikellamy came to Ostuagy in 1742.

Madame Montour was known to be a friend of the British. She welcomed the white men who were beginning to migrate into the West Branch Susquehanna River Valley. She also had a great amount of influence with the various Indian tribes they were feeling the pressure of colonial expansion. Madame Montour remained loyal to the British despite several attempts by the French to bring her over to their side. Historians note that this was remarkable as the British colonial government sometimes went as long as a year without paying her for her services.

=== Early inhabitants ===
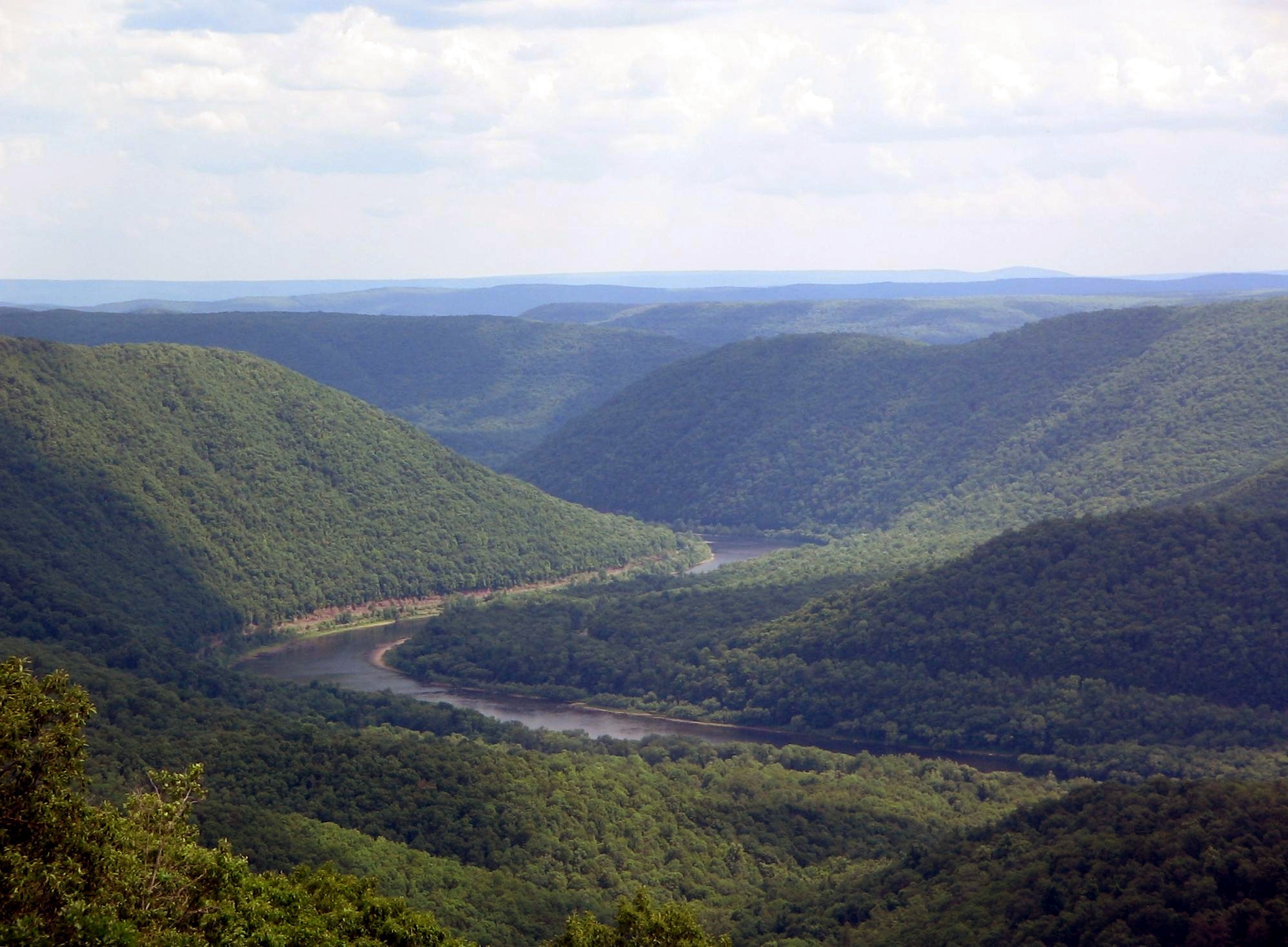
West Branch Susquehanna Valley seen from Hyner View State Park in Clinton County, Pennsylvania

The first recorded inhabitants of the west branch of the Susquehanna River valley were the Iroquoian speaking Susquehannocks. Their name meant "people of the muddy river" in Algonquian. Decimated by diseases and warfare, they had died out, moved away, or been assimilated into other tribes by the early 18th century. The lands of the West Branch Susquehanna River Valley were then chiefly occupied by the Munsee phratry of the Lenape (or Delaware), and were under the nominal control of the Five (later Six) Nations of the Iroquois.

The British purchased land from the Iroquois in the Treaty of Fort Stanwix of 1768, opening what is now Lycoming County to settlement. However, the Line of Property (or Purchase Line) border defined by "Tiadaghton Creek" dividing colonial and Native American lands was disputed. The colonists claimed this was Pine Creek, the Iroquois and other tribes Lycoming Creek. The area between Pine and Lycoming Creeks was disputed territory. The illegal settlers there were part of the "Fair Play Men" system of self-government, with their own Declaration of Independence from Britain on July 4, 1776.

In the American Revolutionary War, settlements throughout the Susquehanna Valley were attacked by Loyalists and Native Americans allied with the British. After the Wyoming Valley battle and massacre in the summer of 1778 (near what is now Wilkes-Barre) and smaller local attacks, the "Big Runaway" occurred throughout the West Branch Susquehanna valley. Settlers fled feared and actual attacks by the British and their allies. Homes and fields were abandoned, with livestock driven along and a few possessions floated on rafts on the river east to Muncy, then further south to Sunbury. The abandoned property was burnt by the attackers. Some settlers soon returned, only to flee again in the summer of 1779 in the "Little Runaway". Sullivan's Expedition helped stabilize the area and encouraged resettlement, which continued after the war.

=== Fair Play Men ===
The Fair Play Men were illegal settlers (squatters) who established their own system of self-rule from 1773 to 1785 in the West Branch Susquehanna River valley of Pennsylvania in what is now the United States. Because they settled in territory claimed by Native Americans, they had no recourse to the Pennsylvania colonial government. Accordingly, they established what was known as the Fair Play System, with three elected commissioners who ruled on land claims and other issues for the group. In a remarkable coincidence, the Fair Play Men made their own declaration of independence from Britain on July 4, 1776, beneath the "Tiadaghton Elm" on the banks of Pine Creek.

=== Fort Antes ===
Fort Antes was a stockade surrounding the home of Colonel John Henry Antes, built circa 1778 in Revolutionary Pennsylvania in the United States. The fort was built under the direction of Colonel Antes, who was a member of the Pennsylvania militia. It was on the east side of Antes Creek, overlooking and on the left bank of the West Branch Susquehanna River on a plateau in Nippenose Township south of modern-day Jersey Shore in western Lycoming County. The local militia held the fort for a short period of time until it was ordered to abandon Fort Antes during the Big Runaway by Colonel Samuel Hunter. Despite being abandoned and attempts by the attacking British forces to burn it down, Fort Antes was one of only two structures in the valley to survive the Big Runaway.

=== Susquehanna Boom ===
The Susquehanna Boom was a system of cribs in the West Branch Susquehanna River designed to hold timber in the river until it could be processed at one of the nearly 60 sawmills along the West Branch Susquehanna River between Lycoming and Loyalsock Creeks in Lycoming County, Pennsylvania in the United States. The boom was constructed in 1846 under the supervision of James H. Perkins. A boom is a chain or line of connected floating timbers extended across a river, lake, or harbor (as to obstruct passage or catch floating objects). The Susquehanna Boom extended seven miles upstream from Duboistown to the village of Linden in Woodward Township. The boom was constructed by creating a series of man-made islands known as "cribs". These cribs built of local mountain stone and sunken timber were stretched diagonally across the river, beginning on the south side near Duboistown and ending on the north side near Linden. The boom was made of 352 separate cribs that were 22 feet high. The boom was opened and closed at the upper end by a device known as a "sheer boom." It was 1,000 feet long and was controlled with a hand-powered windlass. The sheer boom gathered the logs into the main boom that was capable of holding up to 300 million board feet (710,000 m^{3}) of logs. The lower end of the boom was where the logs were sorted. The mills in Williamsport, South Williamsport, and Duboistown each had their own distinctive brand burnt into the logs. The men working at the end of the boom would sort the logs according to their corresponding brand and float them into the correct holding pond along the bank of the river. During the height of the lumber industry in Lycoming County, 1861–1891, the various mills produced 5.5 billion board feet (13,000,000 m^{3}) of lumber. Williamsport became one of the most prosperous cities in Pennsylvania and in the United States. Men like James H. Perkins, Peter Herdic, and Mahlon Fisher became millionaires while many of the men who actually worked in the river struggled to survive on the wages paid to them by the lumber barons.

== Principal towns in the West Branch Susquehanna Valley ==
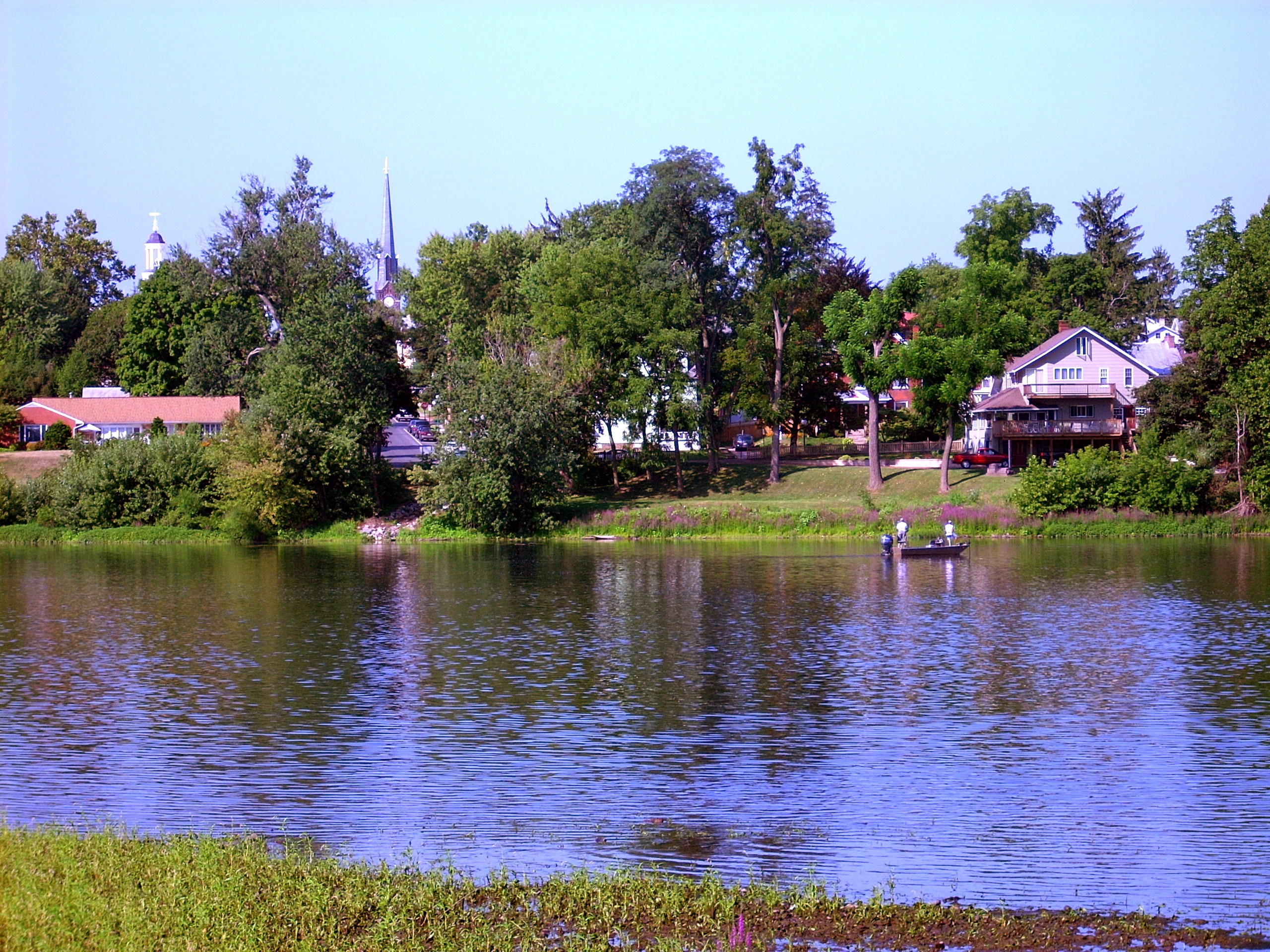
Lewisburg, Pennsylvania seen from Mays Drive In on the opposite bank of the west branch of the Susquehanna River

From west to east, down stream along the West Branch Susquehanna River:

- Lock Haven
- Jersey Shore
- Williamsport
- Montoursville
- Muncy
- Montgomery
- Watsontown
- Milton
- Lewisburg
