= Woodward Township, Lycoming County, Pennsylvania =

Township in Pennsylvania, US

- Township
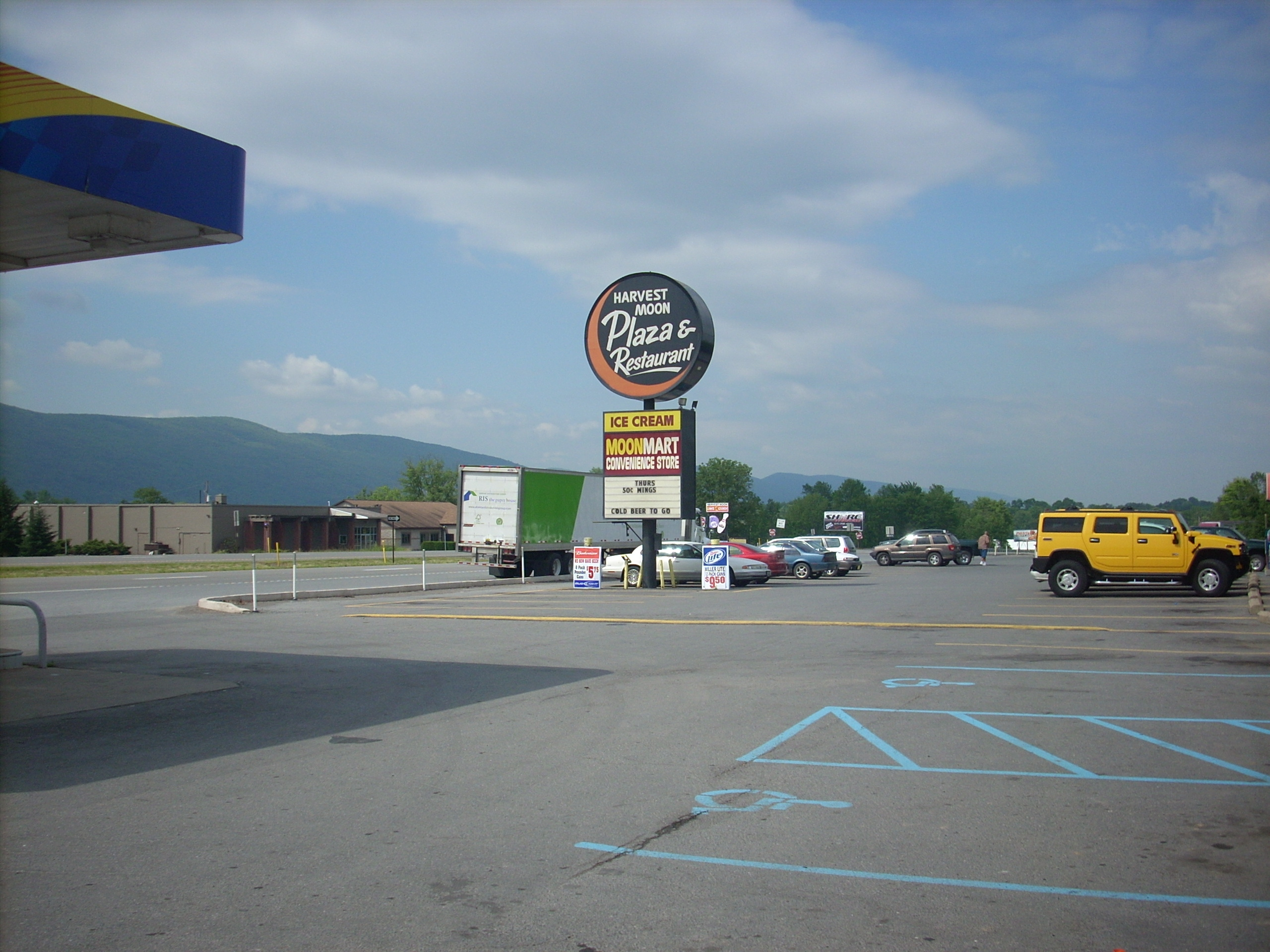
- The Harvest Moon is a Woodward Township landmark on U.S. Route 220.

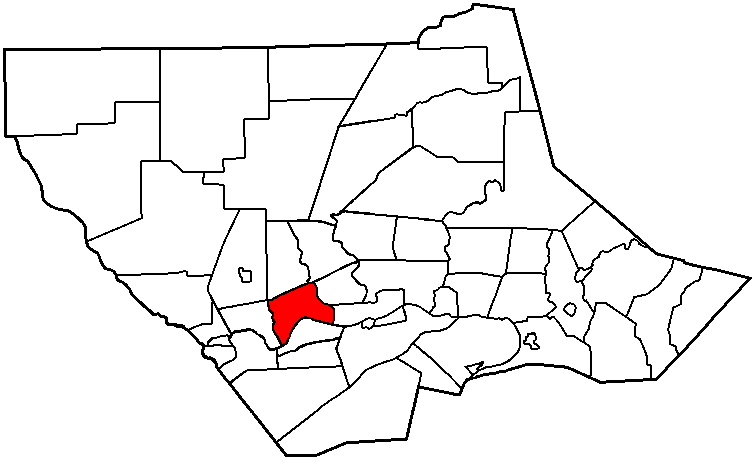
- Map of Lycoming County, Pennsylvania highlighting Woodward Township

- Map of Lycoming County, Pennsylvania
- Coordinates: 41°13′47″N 77°8′38″W
- Country: United States
- State: Pennsylvania
- County: Lycoming
- Settled: 1772
- Incorporated: 1855

Area
  - Total: 13.54 sq mi (35.07 km^{2})
  - Land: 12.98 sq mi (33.62 km^{2})
  - Water: 0.56 sq mi (1.45 km^{2})
- Elevation: 768 ft (234 m)

Population (2020)
  - Total: 2,043 ▼
  - Estimate (2021): 2,033
  - Density: 166.9/sq mi (64.45/km^{2})
- Time zone: UTC-5 (Eastern (EST))
  - Summer (DST): UTC-4 (EDT)
- FIPS code: 42-081-86456
- GNIS feature ID: 1216778
- Website: woodwardtownship.org

Woodward Township is a township in Lycoming County, Pennsylvania, United States. The population was 2,043 at the 2020 census, down from 2,200 in 2010. It is part of the Williamsport Metropolitan Statistical Area.

== History ==
Woodward Township was formed on November 23, 1855, by dividing Anthony Township. It is named for Apollos Woodward, an associate judge in Williamsport at the time. The population of Woodward Township was 817 at the 1890 census, and had grown to 2,200 as of the 2010 census. The township, which is bisected by Quenshukeny Run, is semi-rural in nature. The northern parts of the township are less heavily populated than the southern sections, which lie on U.S. Route 220 and serve as a suburb for Williamsport and Jersey Shore.

When Woodward Township was first settled by migrants from Europe it was outside the boundaries of the Province of Pennsylvania. These settlers were not under the rule or protection of the colonial government in Philadelphia. Together they formed their own form of government that was administered by a group of pioneers known as the Fair Play Men. These early settlers banded together to provide law and order to a land that was wild and dangerous.

Brattan Caldwell, a native of County Kildare, Ireland, migrated to the Thirteen Colonies in 1770. He arrived in Philadelphia and from there moved to Lancaster County. He joined with other pioneers and followed the Susquehanna River and its West Branch into the frontier. Caldwell and the other settlers arrived in what is now Woodward Township in 1772. They cleared land along the river and its tributaries. Caldwell married Elcy Hughes in the winter of 1775 on the south side of the river in Nippenose Township. This part of the West Branch Susquehanna Valley was under the jurisdiction and protection of the colonial government of Pennsylvania. The Hughes were married by a Northumberland County justice of the peace. It was the first marriage to take place in the settlements west of Lycoming Creek.

In the Revolutionary War, settlements throughout the Susquehanna valley were attacked by Loyalists and Native Americans allied with the British. After the Wyoming Valley battle and massacre in the summer of 1778 (near what is now Wilkes-Barre) and smaller local attacks, the "Big Runaway" occurred throughout the West Branch Susquehanna valley. Settlers fled feared and actual attacks by the British and their allies. Homes and fields were abandoned, with livestock driven along and a few possessions floated on rafts on the river east to Muncy, then further south to Sunbury. The abandoned property was burnt by the attackers. Some settlers soon returned, only to flee again in the summer of 1779 in the "Little Runaway". Sullivan's Expedition helped stabilize the area and encouraged resettlement, which continued after the war. Brattan Caldwell and his family fled to Lancaster County and did not return to their land until after Sullivan's Expedition. Caldwell obtained legal rights to the land he had settled in 1784 following the second Treaty of Fort Stanwix.

Linden is the only village in Woodward Township. It sprung up as a shanty town during the construction of the Pennsylvania Canal. The contractors building the canal built the shanty town for the laborers who were building the canal.

== Geography ==
Woodward Township is southwest of the center of Lycoming County and is bordered by Anthony Township to the north, Lycoming Township at the northeast corner, Old Lycoming Township and the city of Williamsport to the east, the West Branch Susquehanna River to the south (with Susquehanna Township south of the river), and Piatt Township to the west. The township contains the unincorporated communities of Glosser View, Linden, and Pine Run. The township offices are in Linden.

U.S. Route 220 crosses the southern part of the township as it travels the West Branch Susquehanna River valley. The highway leads east 8 miles (13 km) to Williamsport and west 7 miles (11 km) to Jersey Shore. Harrisburg, the state capital, is 91 miles (146 km) to the south.

According to the United States Census Bureau, the township has a total area of 13.6 square miles (35.1 km^{2}), of which 13.0 square miles (33.6 km^{2}) are land and 0.54 square miles (1.4 km^{2}), or 4.13%, are water. The township is drained by the West Branch Susquehanna River and three tributaries: from west to east, Pine Run, Quenshukeny Run, and Daugherty Run.

== Demographics ==
Historical population
Census	Pop.	Note	%±
2010	2,200		—
2020	2,043		−7.1%
2021 (est.)	2,033		−0.5%
U.S. Decennial Census

As of the census of 2000, there were 2,397 people, 946 households, and 693 families residing in the township. The population density was 182.2 inhabitants per square mile (70.3/km^{2}). There were 1,010 housing units at an average density of 76.8 per square mile (29.7/km^{2}). The racial makeup of the township was 98.25% White, 0.75% African American, 0.17% Native American, 0.17% Asian, 0.08% from other races, and 0.58% from two or more races. Hispanic or Latino of any race were 0.17% of the population.

There were 946 households, out of which 30.4% had children under the age of 18 living with them, 59.6% were married couples living together, 8.9% had a female householder with no husband present, and 26.7% were non-families. 21.4% of all households were made up of individuals, and 7.7% had someone living alone who was 65 years of age or older. The average household size was 2.53 and the average family size was 2.92.

In the township the population was spread out, with 23.5% under the age of 18, 8.6% from 18 to 24, 28.5% from 25 to 44, 27.1% from 45 to 64, and 12.3% who were 65 years of age or older. The median age was 39 years. For every 100 females there were 99.6 males. For every 100 females age 18 and over, there were 99.3 males.

The median income for a household in the township was $35,398, and the median income for a family was $38,750. Males had a median income of $30,345 versus $19,500 for females. The per capita income for the township was $15,659. About 6.8% of families and 8.5% of the population were below the poverty line, including 9.7% of those under age 18 and 6.6% of those age 65 or over.
