= Big Runaway =

June-July 1778 mass exodus

The Big Runaway
- Part of the American Revolutionary War
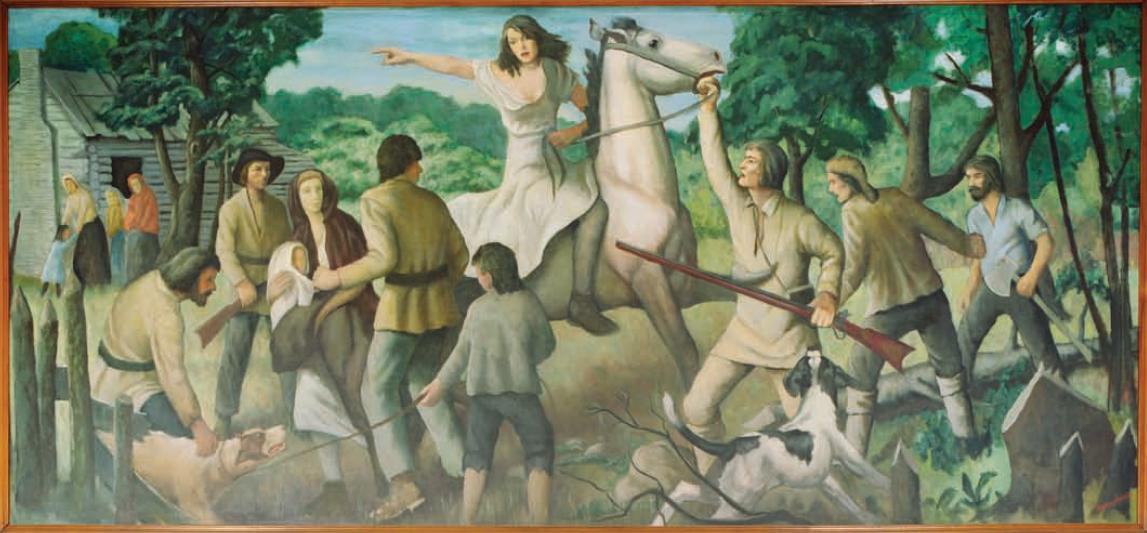
Date	July 1778
Location	Pennsylvania
Result	British victory, American evacuation of the West Branch Susquehanna Valley

Belligerents
Great Britain: Haudenosaunee Confederacy; Mohawk; Seneca; Cayuga; Lenape	United States

Commanders and leaders
	Samuel Hunter

The Big Runaway was a mass evacuation in June and July 1778 of European settlers from the frontier regions of North Central Pennsylvania during the American Revolutionary War. It was precipitated by a series of raids against local settlements on the northern and western branches of the Susquehanna River by Loyalist troops and British-allied Indians, which prompted Patriot militia commanders to order the evacuation. Most of the settlers relocated to Fort Augusta near modern-day Sunbury, Pennsylvania at the confluence of the northern and western branches of the Susquehanna River, while their abandoned houses and farms were all burnt as part of a scorched earth policy.

Some settlers returned soon after, but the Loyalist and Indians renewed their raids in the following year, leading to a second evacuation known as The Little Runaway. These attacks on the Pennsylvania frontier led to retaliatory raids by the Continental Army against the Native Americans, including Sullivan's Expedition, which destroyed more than 40 Haudenosaunee villages and killed thousands of non-combatants.

== Background ==
In 1768, the Colony of Pennsylvania and the Haudenosaunee Confederacy signed the Treaty of Fort Stanwix, in which the boundary between colonial and Haudenosaunee lands was adjusted in the colony's favor in exchange for some financial considerations and other guarantees. Settlers soon began arriving in the area (known as the "New Purchase") and increased settlements along the West Branch of the Susquehanna helped lead to the formation of Northumberland County in 1772. The settlements along the river were in what are now parts of Northumberland, Union, Lycoming, and Clinton Counties.

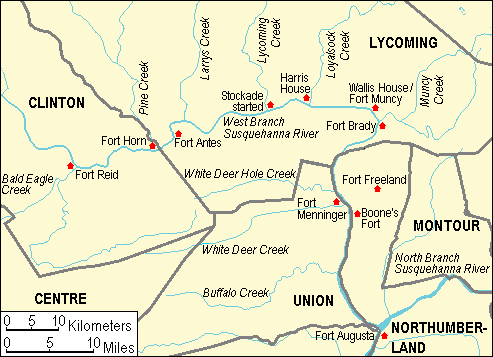
Map of fortifications and streams in north-central Pennsylvania during the Big Runaway. Modern county borders are shown for orientation.

The New Purchase territory extended as far west as "Tiadaghton Creek". The identity of this creek was disputed, with the colonists claiming it was Pine Creek (further west, giving them more territory), while the Haudenosaunee claimed it was Lycoming Creek (further east). The colonial government recognized Lycoming Creek as the boundary, so settlements made to its west violated the treaty. Despite this, there were settlers west of Lycoming Creek and west of Pine Creek about to modern-day Lock Haven. Because they fell outside the colony's bounds, the settlers in this area received no protection or government from the colony, so they formed their own system of self-rule, known as the Fair Play system.

When the American Revolutionary War broke out in 1775, most of the settlers in that area favored independence from Great Britain and supported the Patriot cause. About 75 soldiers from the territory that became Lycoming County served in the Continental Army, but the West Branch of the Susquehanna valley soon became a front in the war as well. According to tradition, the Fair Play Men made their own Declaration of Independence from Britain at the mouth of Pine Creek on July 4, 1776, unaware of the Continental Congress' declaration.

There had always been tensions between the settlers and natives, with some attacks, especially in the "Fair Play" area. This became more serious in the winter of 1777–78, when two settlers were killed by Native Americans in separate incidents, and then two Native Americans in a party of nine were killed by Colonel John Henry Antes and his men in a skirmish. Later a party of Native American raiders who had plundered along Buffalo Creek, near Lewisburg in Union County, were stopped near modern Jersey Shore in Lycoming County and their booty was recovered.

== British-Haudenosaunee planning ==
As part of General John Burgoyne's failed 1777 campaign for the Hudson River, the British in Quebec recruited large numbers of Native Americans, some of whom participated in Burgoyne's campaign. Quebec's Governor Guy Carleton had previously restricted their use in Quebec territory (which at that time encompassed the Haudenosaunee lands now in Pennsylvania) and specifically refused to release supplies for expeditions beyond the treaty line. Carleton was, however, ordered by Secretary of State George Germain to expand recruitment in May 1777. This Carleton did, encouraging and funding John Butler at Fort Niagara for the purpose. During the winter of 1777–78, Butler, Mohawk leader Joseph Brant, and Seneca leaders Cornplanter and Sayenqueraghta planned operations for the 1778 campaign season. These allies could not immediately agree on actions to take, but in a December 1777 meeting the Haudenosaunee expressed a desire to launch "a very formidable irruption with their whole collected force" against the frontier. The Seneca leaders in particular sought to target the Susquehanna's west branch, since it provided access to their lands in what is now western New York. After first campaigning further south (in what is now West Virginia and southwestern Pennsylvania), parties of Seneca, Cayuga, and Lenape warriors began moving into the upper Susquehanna valley.

== Raiding campaign ==
On May 16, 1778, three settlers were killed by Native Americans near the mouth of Bald Eagle Creek, and three men, seven women, and several children were captured by Native Americans in two attacks over the next four days. Later in May, three settler families on Loyalsock Creek were wiped out: their cabins were burnt, two were killed, and fourteen disappeared, presumed captured by Native Americans. In separate incidents in late May, three settlers (a man, woman and boy) were taken prisoner near modern Linden in Woodward Township, and three Fair Play men were killed (while one escaped) as they tried to get a boat to evacuate their families to Fort Horn at the mouth of Pine Creek. Near modern Lock Haven a skirmish led to the wounding of one Native American and one Fair Play man.

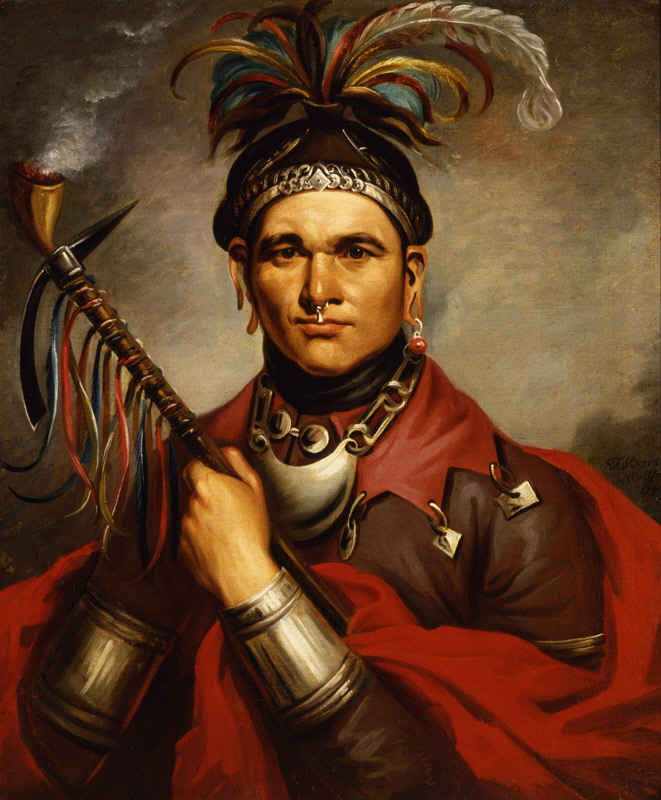
Seneca war chief Cornplanter

The local militias were short of men (as many had joined the army), weapons, and supplies. The Supreme Executive Council of Pennsylvania was focused on supplying the army and levied taxes, which were in some cases more than the net worth of the individual settlers. Despite pleas from the settlers for more assistance, the colonial government did not send help initially, but as the West Branch Susquehanna valley became a new theater of the war, the council reconsidered the matter. On May 21, 1778, it pledged to send the settlers "one hundred fire arms of which thirty-one are rifles" from Harris's Ferry (modern Harrisburg), plus another "seventy rifles [which] had been obtained from the Continental store", as well as allocating 500 pounds of lead (for bullets) and 250 pounds of gunpowder to the settlers. They also asked that General George Washington send 250 riflemen from the army to assist the defense of the frontier. However, none of this aid arrived in time to help the settlers.

Primitive forts and smaller fortified houses gave the settlers some protection. From west to east, these included Fort Reed (at modern-day Lock Haven), Fort Horn (at the mouth of Pine Creek), Antes Fort (opposite modern Jersey Shore), a fortified house near the mouth of Lycoming Creek (modern Williamsport), the fortified Harris house near the mouth of Loyalsock Creek (modern Montoursville), Fort Muncy and the fortified Brady House (both near modern Muncy), and Fort Freeland (near modern Turbotville). As the situation worsened, more settlers moved temporarily to the forts and fortified houses. They were still vulnerable when they had to return to their homes and farms to tend to their crops and livestock.

June 10, 1778, has been called the "bloodiest day" in the history of Lycoming County, with three separate attacks on parties of settlers. Two of these attacks were along Loyalsock Creek and the third was near Lycoming Creek. In the first incident a party of twelve, including a friendly Native American and a black man, set out from the fortified Wallis house near modern Muncy to look for stolen horses. Robert Covenhoven, a guide and former soldier, was sent as a messenger to order the party's return. When the party's commander, Captain Berry, refused to turn back, Covenhoven joined the party as a guide and scout. No horses were found, and returning via the same route they had taken earlier (against the advice of Covenhoven) the party was ambushed. Some were killed immediately, six were captured (including the black man, who was burned at the stake), and Covenhoven and a few others escaped. Meanwhile, a second party of three men had set out the same day from the Wallis house to retrieve cattle from the Thomson farm. They were ambushed there by a group of Native Americans and at least one Tory, with two settlers killed and the third wounded and taken prisoner. Yet another party was bringing supplies to the westernmost forts, heard the shots of this attack, but were too late to help.

Later that same day, a party of sixteen settlers on its way to Lycoming Creek were attacked in what is now Williamsport. In what became known as the "Plum Tree Massacre", twelve of the sixteen were killed and scalped, including two women and six children. Two girls were taken prisoner, and a boy and a girl escaped and made it to settlements on Lycoming Creek. They were so frightened by the attack that they were unable to communicate clearly where it occurred. Later search parties found all the victims of the three attacks. It was thought that all the attacks were the work of one group of Native Americans and Tories that had come south along Lycoming Creek on the Sheshequin Path.

== Mass evacuation ==
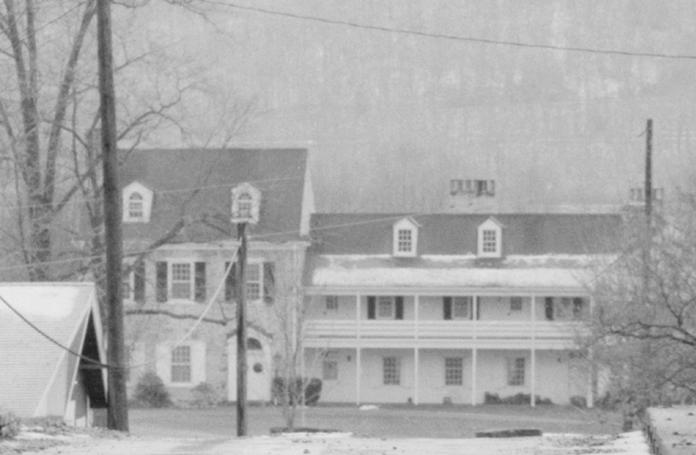
The stone Wallis House (seen here in 1984) was one of only two structures to survive the attacks, and is now the oldest building in Lycoming County

All of these attacks and the lack of military help from the Pennsylvania government disheartened the settlers along the West Branch of the Susquehanna. In the early summer of 1778 news came of a group of Native American warriors, perhaps accompanied by Loyalist and British soldiers, heading for the West Branch Susquehanna River valley to destroy all the settlements there. This news was provided by a friendly Native American named Job Chiiloway at Fort Reed (modern Lock Haven), who was then murdered as he slept, by a drunk settler engaged in target shooting. The Battle of Wyoming on July 3, 1778, near what is now Wilkes-Barre, triggered false rumours of a widespread massacre of women and children. This news caused the local authorities to order the evacuation of the whole West Branch valley.

At least two riders braved attacks to warn their fellow settlers. Rachel Silverthorn volunteered (when no man would) to leave the relative safety of Fort Muncy (in Muncy Township). She rode along Muncy Creek and the Wyalusing Path and warned settlers, who fled to the safety of Fort Muncy. Her own family's cabin was later burnt to the ground. Robert Covenhoven, who had served under George Washington in the Continental Army and survived the attacks of June 10, rode west along the ridge of Bald Eagle Mountain to warn settlers at Fort Antes (opposite what is now Jersey Shore) and the western part of the valley. Covenhoven is listed as a Fair Play Man and one of the signers of the Tiadaghton Declaration of Independence.

Most settlers had already gathered at the small forts and fortified houses for safety, but now the forts and the settlers' homes and fields were abandoned, with livestock driven along and a few possessions floated on rafts on the river east to what is now Muncy, then further south to Fort Augusta at what is now Sunbury. Women and children rode on the rafts, while the men walked on the river bank to protect them and to drive along the livestock they had been able to save. Their abandoned property was burnt by the attackers. Some settlers reported fleeing at night with the glow of their burning settlements lighting the sky behind them.

Fort Horn and the other Fair Play Men settlements were all destroyed. In the New Purchase, only Fort Antes (made of hard-to-burn peeled oak logs) and the stone Wallis House survived the flames. The property losses were estimated at £40,000, and there were deaths among the settlers. Colonel Samuel Hunter, the commander of Fort Augusta, was roundly criticized for ordering the evacuation. Many at the time felt that military assistance would have allowed the settlers to withstand the attackers.

== Aftermath ==
Some settlers soon returned, a few while the ruins of their homes still smoldered. Many of those who fled were recent immigrants from New Jersey, fleeing the war there. Many of those had been poorly equipped and were ill-equipped to withstand attacks, and simply returned to New Jersey. The government of Pennsylvania sent military aid. Colonel Thomas Hartley built Fort Muncy to protect returning settlers. On September 24, 1778, he led a force of about 200 men up the Sheshequin Path on Lycoming Creek to the North Branch of the Susquehanna to strike back against the Haudenosaunee. Hartley's expedition covered about 300 miles (500 km) in two weeks, defeated several bands of Haudenosaunee and destroyed a few native villages. This proved the feasibility of operating in the Haudenosaunee territory and preceded the Continental Army's major expedition into Haudenosaunee territory the next year.

In the summer of 1779, General John Sullivan led an expedition that went up the North Branch of the Susquehanna and destroyed at least forty Native American villages in New York and Pennsylvania in a scorched earth campaign. The Native Americans were aware of Sullivan's plans and launched their own attack on the West Branch of the Susquehanna, hoping to draw off Sullivan or even attack him from behind. Their attacking force was discovered as it descended the Sheshequin Path along Lycoming Creek by Robert Covenhoven, sent as a scout again. The authorities ordered a second evacuation, so that those settlers who had returned did so only to flee a second time in the summer of 1779, in what became known as the "Little Runaway". The second force was about 200 Native Americans and 100 British and Tory soldiers and attacked the valley again. While the evacuation was less panicked this time, Fort Freeland (near modern Turbotville and Watsontown) did not evacuate. It is unclear if they failed to receive the order to evacuate or ignored it, but over half of the settlers who had fled there were killed, with most of the rest taken prisoner. In any case, Sullivan's expedition and the harsh winter that followed it helped reduce attacks, stabilized the area, and encouraged resettlement. The Little Runaway and Sullivan's Expedition also led to an increased commitment by the government to the security of the frontier.

== Fortifications ==
- Fort Augusta - at the confluence of the Susquehanna River in Northumberland County. This stronghold was the headquarters of the militia in the Susquehanna Valley. The settlers fled here during the Big Runaway.
- Boone's Fort - a stockaded gristmill owned by Hawkins Boone, the cousin of Daniel Boone.
- Fort Menninger - near the mouth of White Deer Creek in what is now Union County
- Fort Freeland - in north central Northumberland County near Turbotville
- Fort Brady - the fortified home of Captain John Brady near Muncy in what is now southern Lycoming County.
- Fort Muncy - the fortified home of Samuel Wallis in what is now Muncy Township just a few miles from Fort Brady.
- Harris House - a fortified home near the mouth of Loyalsock Creek also in Lycoming County.
- Stockade Started - this stockade was never completed. It was along Lycoming Creek in the west end of Williamsport
- Fort Antes - a stockade surrounding the fortified home of Colonel John Henry Antes in Nippenose Township south of modern Jersey Shore.
- Fort Horn - at the mouth of Pine Creek in eastern Clinton County
- Fort Reid - at the mouth of Bald Eagle Creek near modern-day Lock Haven in Clinton County, Pennsylvania.
