= Fort Antes =

- Location within Pennsylvania
- 41°11′28″N 77°14′19″W
- Location: Nippenose Township, Pennsylvania, USA
- Nearest city: Jersey Shore, Pennsylvania

History
- Built: 1777 or 1778

Site notes
- Area: 0.75 acres (3,000 m^{2})

Fort Antes was a stockade surrounding the home of Colonel John Henry Antes, built circa 1778 in Revolutionary Pennsylvania in the United States. The fort was built under the direction of Colonel Antes, who was a member of the Pennsylvania militia. It was on the east side of Antes Creek, overlooking and on the left bank of the West Branch Susquehanna River on a plateau in Nippenose Township south of modern day Jersey Shore in western Lycoming County. The local militia held the fort for a short period of time until it was ordered to abandon Fort Antes during the Big Runaway by Colonel Samuel Hunter. Despite being abandoned and attempts by the attacking British forces to burn it down, Fort Antes was one of only two structures in the valley to survive the Big Runaway.

== John Henry Antes ==
John Henry Antes settled along the West Branch Susquehanna River circa 1772. His property was on the very edge of the Pennsylvania frontier. Antes’ neighbors on the north side of the West Branch Susquehanna and west of Lycoming Creek were outside the jurisdiction of the colonial government of Pennsylvania. They banded together to form the Fair Play Men. Antes, as a Justice of the Peace for what was then Northumberland County, worked closely with the Fair Play Men. He conducted their weddings and his stockade provided some protection against raids conducted by local Native Americans, who began fighting back against the encroachment of the Europeans. Antes built a gristmill along Antes Creek in 1773. It was the most advanced construction of any kind in frontier north-central Pennsylvania. John Henry Antes served as a Justice of the Peace from July 29, 1775, until January 24, 1776, when he was appointed captain of 58 militiamen under Colonel James Potter. After participating in a raid conducted by Colonel William Plunket against settlers from Connecticut in the Wyoming Valley near Wilkes-Barre, Antes returned to his gristmill, home and future fort in mid-1777. He also was promoted to Lieutenant Colonel that same year.

== Frontier Outpost ==
The Lenape allies of the British began conducting raids on the Pennsylvania frontier soon after the outset of the American Revolution. An attack at the mouth of Pine Creek in December 1777 and another attack further upstream, near modern Lock Haven, prompted action by Pennsylvania's militia to try to protect the frontiersmen on the West Branch Susquehanna River. Colonel Samuel Hunter ordered Colonel Antes to gather a force of men from the West Branch Valley to gather at Antes' property. The men of the militia built a stockade that was at least 12 feet (4 m) high around the Antes home. The stockade enclosed approximately three quarters of an acre (3,000 m^{2}). Colonel Antes was forced to defend an extensive frontier that was under steady attack from Native American and Tory forces that were dispatched to Pennsylvania from Fort Niagara on Lake Ontario in New York.

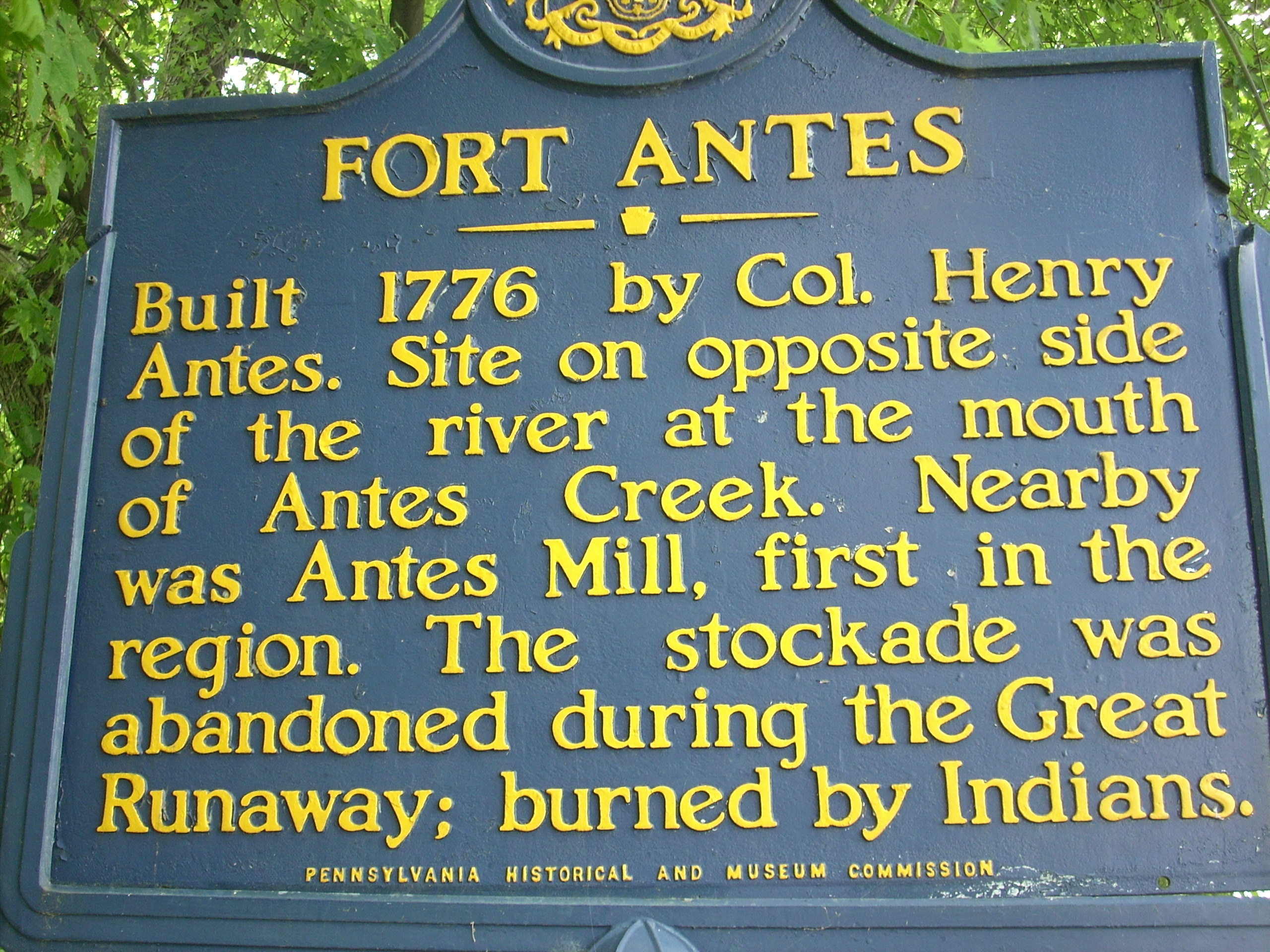
This historical marker for Fort Antes is in Jersey Shore, Pennsylvania, across the West Branch Susquehanna River from Nippenose Township.

Two settlers who were staying near Fort Antes were killed in June 1777. A party of four men and two women had left the safety of the fort and crossed the West Branch of the Susquehanna River to milk some cows that had been left there to pasture. Zephaniah Miller, Abel Cady, and James Armstrong left the riverbank and meadow to gather a cow who had wandered into the surrounding woods. These three men came under attack by a group of warriors who had been hiding in the woods. Sounds of fighting stirred the men at the fort. They crossed the river despite the objections of Colonel Antes who thought that the Native Americans might have set a trap. Upon reaching the other side of the river, the militiamen found Miller dead and Cady and Armstrong mortally wounded. Only Bouser and the women, one of them Cady's wife, survived the attack. This was just one of many attacks in the West Branch Valley that continued to make life more dangerous for the settlers, who were encroaching on tribal land.

All of these attacks and the lack of military help from the Pennsylvania government disheartened the settlers along the West Branch of the Susquehanna. News of impending attacks caused much worry among the settlers and the leaders of the militia. This news was provided by a friendly Native American named Job Chilloway at Fort Reed (modern Lock Haven), who had been converted to Christianity by Moravian missionaries. The Battle of Wyoming occurred on July 3, 1778 (near what is now Wilkes-Barre). A mass attack there overwhelmed small settler forts. Widely reported, but since discredited, reports of a massacre caused the local authorities to order the evacuation of the whole West Branch valley. Although Colonel Antes and his men were successful in building Fort Antes, they were forced to abandon their efforts in July 1778 during the Big Runaway. The raiding parties of Indians and Tories were too numerous for the militia and farmers to defend their lives and property.

== The Big Runaway ==
Robert Covenhoven, who had served under George Washington in the Continental Army, rode west along the ridge of Bald Eagle Mountain to warn settlers and the militia at Fort Antes. Covenhoven followed the ridge for two reasons: first, experience told him that the Native Americans would not be on the level summit of the ridge, thus making him safe from personal attack, and second, he would be able to scout the situation in the valley from atop the ridge. Covenhoven, who was joined by an unnamed employee of Culbertson's Mill in modern Duboistown, was able to see Fort Antes from the ridge. As he slowly approached the stockade, Covenhoven heard the report of a rifle shot and made a run for the fort thinking that he was under fire. This proved to be false - although there were Native Americans in the area and one did fire his weapon, the fire was not aimed at Robert Covenhoven. Instead, a young woman outside the stockade milking a cow was the target, as evidenced by the bullet hole that pierced the folds of her dress. After giving the orders that prompted the Big Runaway, Covenhoven returned to Fort Augusta. Covenhoven is listed as a Fair Play Man and one of the signers of the Tiadaghton Declaration of Independence. Following the war, he continued to serve as a scout on the frontier before retiring to Piatt Township on the north side of the West Branch Susquehanna River.

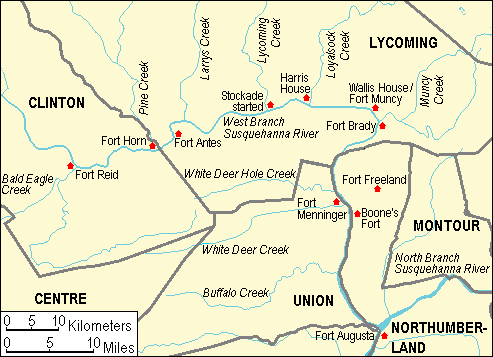
Map of fortifications and streams in north-central Pennsylvania during the Big Runaway. Fort Antes is in western Lycoming County on the south side of the West Branch Susquehanna River.

Most settlers had already gathered at Fort Antes, prior to Covenhoven's arrival, but now the fort and the settlers' homes and fields were abandoned, with livestock driven along and a few possessions floated on rafts on the river east to what is now Muncy, then further south to Fort Augusta at what is now Sunbury. Women and children rode on the rafts, while the men walked on the river bank to protect them and to drive along the livestock they had been able to save. Their abandoned property was burnt by the attackers. Some settlers reported fleeing at night, with the glow of their burning settlements lighting the sky behind them.

Fort Horn and the other Fair Play Men settlements were all destroyed. Only Fort Antes (made of hard-to-burn peeled oak logs) and the fortified Wallis House (made of stone) in Muncy Township survived the flames. The property losses were estimated at £40,000, and there were deaths among the settlers. Colonel Hunter, the commander of Fort Augusta who had ordered the mass evacuation, was criticized roundly. Many at the time felt that military assistance would have allowed the settlers to withstand the attackers.

== Post war years ==
Colonel Henry Antes was one of the first settlers to return to the West Branch Valley following the Big Runaway. He found that his mill had been destroyed, but that his home within the fort had not. Antes soon built a larger home on Antes Creek and the fort was abandoned. It gradually decayed before being dismantled. The ground was leveled and then farmed, and today there are no remnants of Fort Antes to be seen above the ground. Colonel Antes was elected the sheriff of Northumberland County in 1782, thirteen years before Lycoming County was established. John Henry Antes died on May 18, 1820, when he was 83 years old.

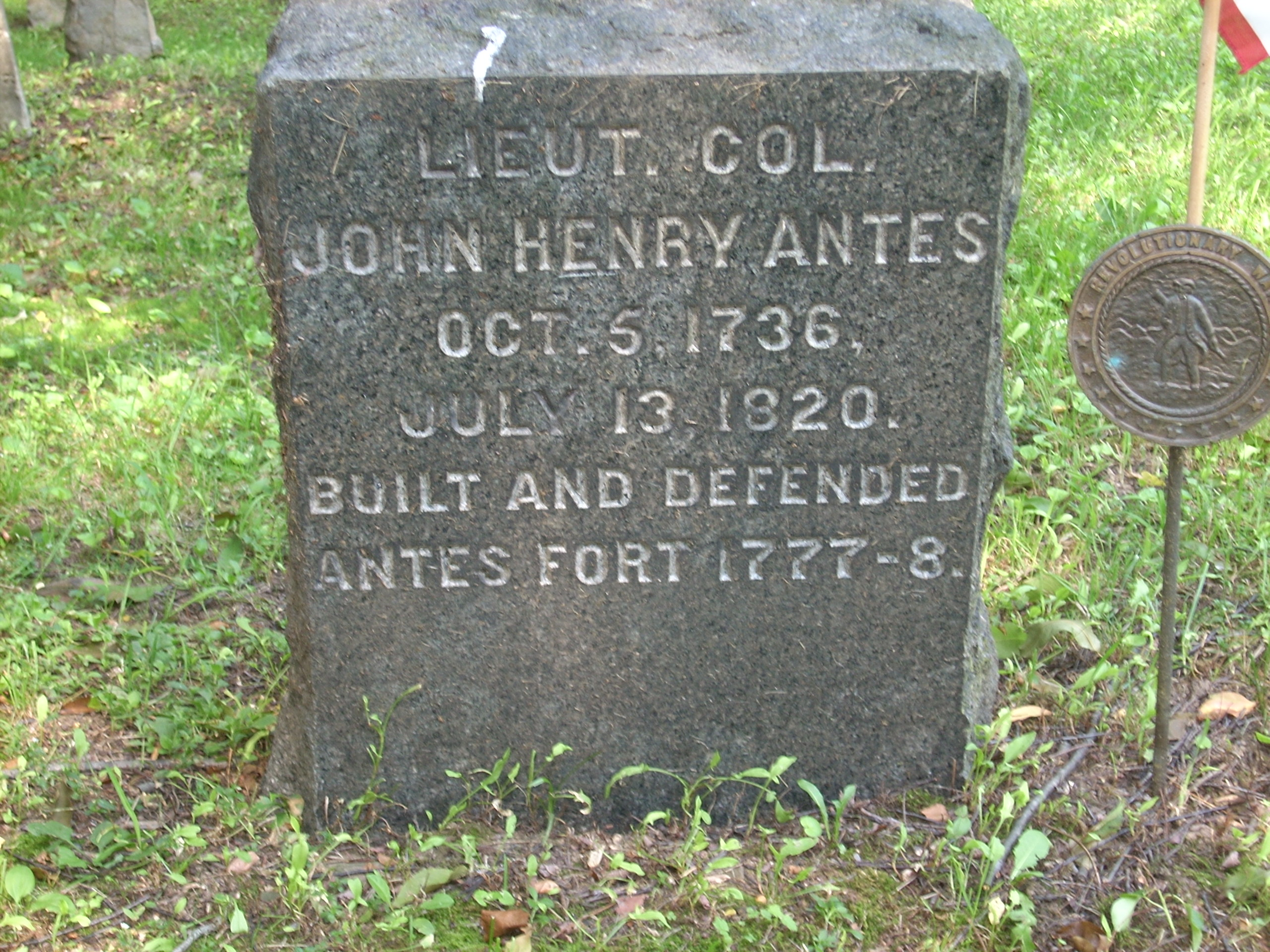
Colonel Antes' grave marker
