= West Branch Susquehanna River =

River in Pennsylvania, United States

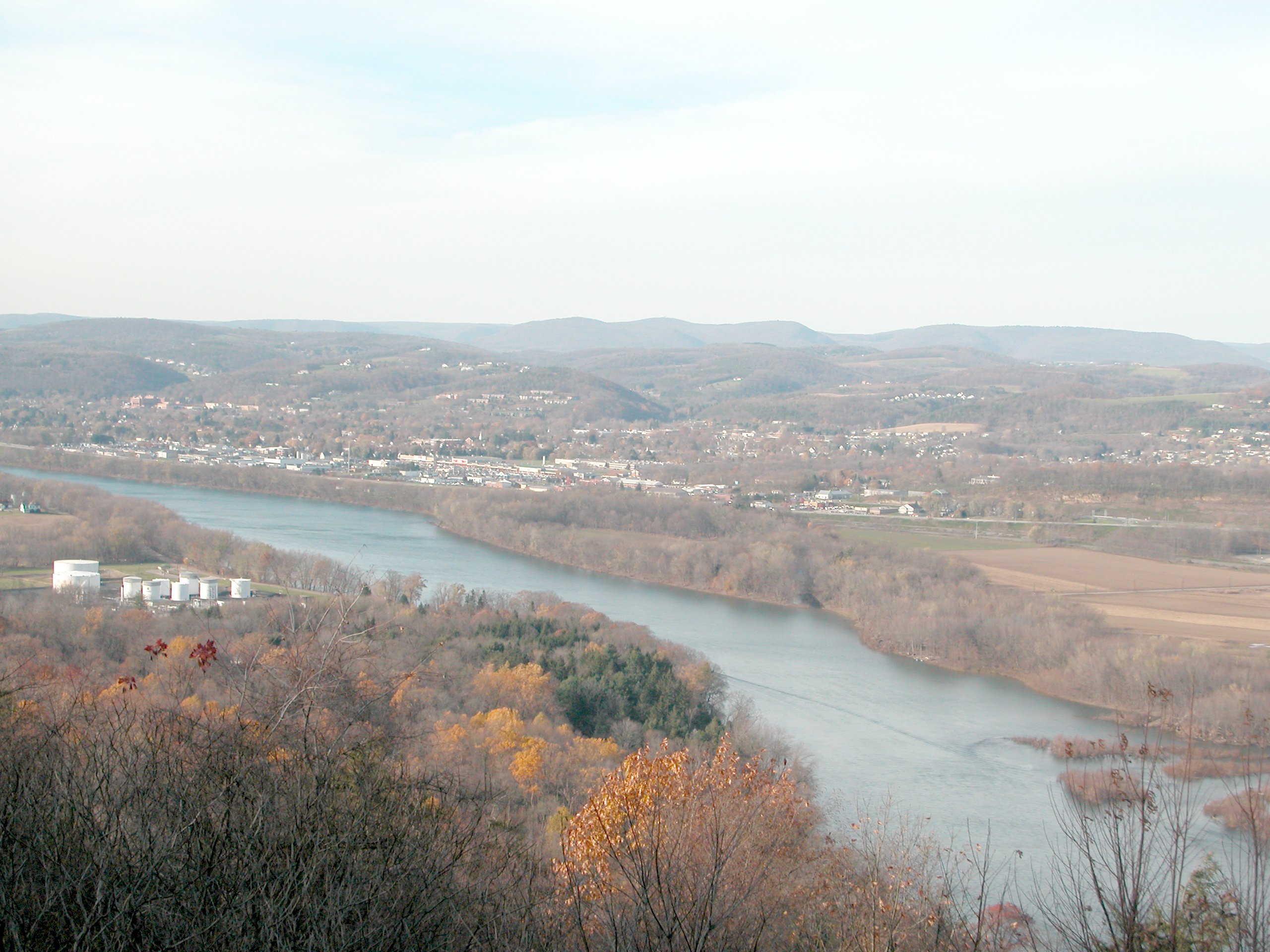
- The eastern side of Williamsport seen from the southeast on Bald Eagle Mountain. In the foreground is the West Branch of the Susquehanna River. Beyond Williamsport can be seen the higher part of the dissected Allegheny Plateau.

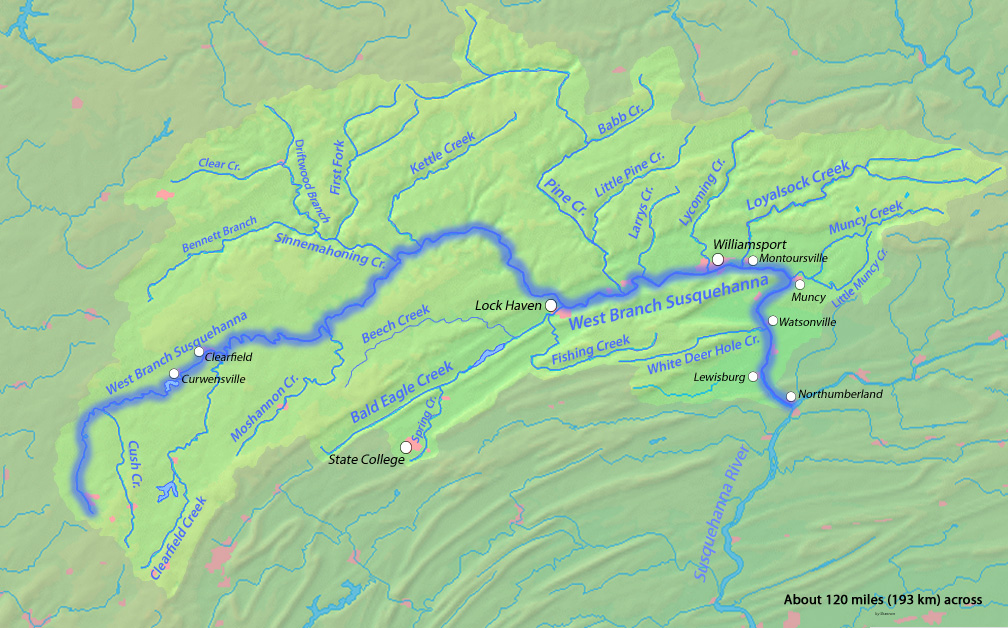
- Map of the West Branch Susquehanna River watershed

Location
- Country: United States
- State: Pennsylvania
- Region: Cambria County, Indiana County, Clearfield County, Clinton County, Centre County, Lycoming County, Northumberland County, Union County, Snyder County

Physical characteristics
- Source: Allegheny Mountains
  - location: Near Carrolltown, Cambria County
  - coordinates: 40.59871°N 78.72311°W
- Mouth: Susquehanna River
  - location: Northumberland, Northumberland County
  - coordinates: 40°52′55″N 76°47′51″W
  - elevation: 423 ft (129 m)
- Length: 243 mi (391 km), West-east
- Basin size: 6,847 sq mi (17,730 km^{2})
- Discharge
  - location: Lewisburg
  - average: 11,229 cu ft/s (318.0 m^{3}/s)
  - maximum: 287,000 cu ft/s (8,100 m^{3}/s)

Basin features
- River system: Susquehanna River
- Tributaries
  - left: Sinnemahoning Creek, Pine Creek, Larrys Creek, Lycoming Creek, Loyalsock Creek, Muncy Creek
  - right: Chest Creek, Anderson Creek, Clearfield Creek, Bald Eagle Creek, White Deer Hole Creek

The West Branch Susquehanna River is one of the two principal branches, along with the North Branch, of the Susquehanna River in the Northeastern United States. The North Branch, which rises in upstate New York, is generally regarded as the extension of the main branch, with the shorter West Branch being its principal tributary.

The West Branch, which is 243 miles (391 km) long, is entirely within the state of Pennsylvania, draining a large mountainous area within the Allegheny Plateau in the western part of the state. Along most of its course it meanders past mountain ridges and through water gaps, forming a large zigzag arc through central Pennsylvania around the north end of the Allegheny Mountains. In colonial times, the river valley provided an important route to the Ohio River valley. In the 19th century, its lower valley became a significant industrial heartland of Pennsylvania. In the 20th century, the upper reaches of the West Branch turned a yellow/orange color due to sulfurous drainage from nearby and abandoned deep bituminous coal mines.

== Course ==
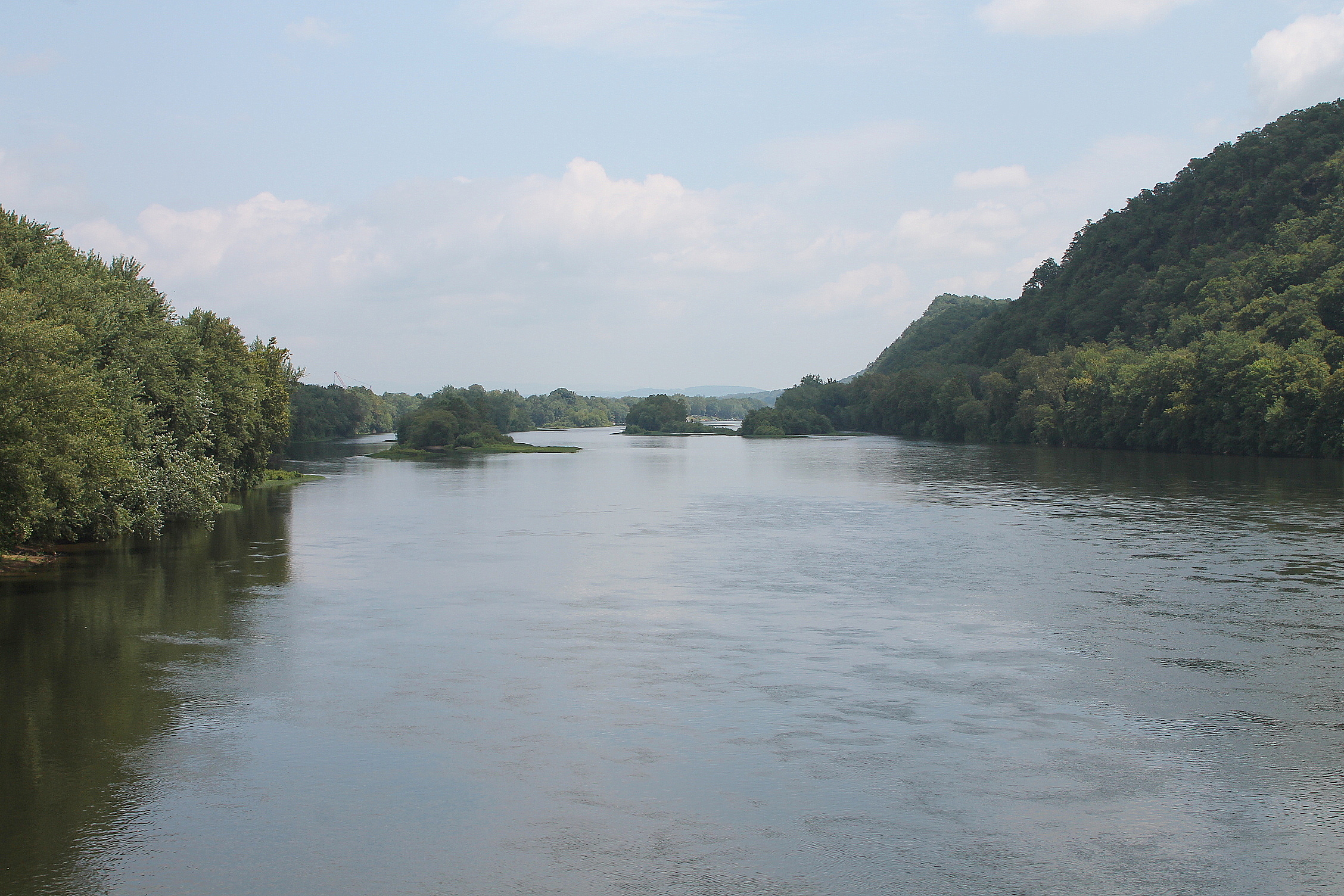
West Branch Susquehanna River near Montgomery, in Lycoming County

The West Branch rises on the west side of the Alleghenies in northwestern Cambria County, just outside the borough of Carrolltown. It flows generally north, crossing the eastern corner of Indiana County at Cherry Tree, then into southern Clearfield County. Near Mahaffey it turns generally northeast and flows past Curwensville and Clearfield. In northern Clinton County it turns to the southeast to Lock Haven. At Lock Haven, it turns east, flowing through the West Branch Susquehanna Valley along the foot of Bald Eagle Mountain ridge past Williamsport, the largest city on the river, then turns south at the end of the ridge. From there it winds around Muncy, emerging from a water gap between Montour Ridge and Shamokin Mountain and joining the north (main) branch of the Susquehanna from the northwest approximately 2 miles (3 km) north of Sunbury.

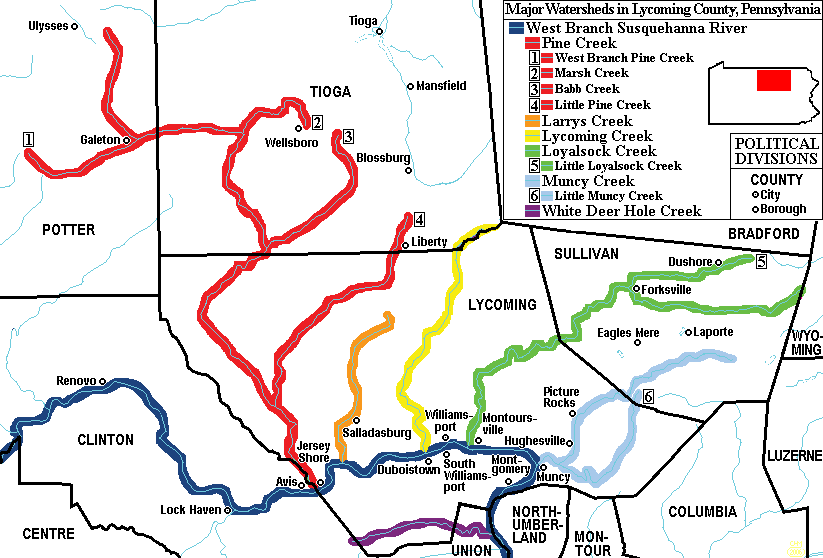
Map of the West Branch Susquehanna River (dark blue) and major tributaries in Lycoming County, Pennsylvania

=== Tributaries ===
From its upper reaches to its lower reaches, it receives:

- Chest Creek from the south at Mahaffey
- Anderson Creek from the west in Curwensville
- Clearfield Creek from the south 2 miles (3 km) east of Clearfield
- Moshannon Creek from the south 3.4 miles (5 km) south of Karthaus
- Sinnemahoning Creek from the northwest at Keating
- Fish Dam Run from the south 4 miles (6 km) southwest of Renovo, Pennsylvania
- Bald Eagle Creek from the southwest at Lock Haven
- Pine Creek and Larrys Creek from the north near Jersey Shore
- Lycoming Creek from the north at Williamsport
- Loyalsock Creek from the northeast at Montoursville
- Muncy Creek from the northeast at Muncy
- White Deer Hole Creek from the south at Allenwood.
- White Deer Creek from the west at White Deer next to the Watsontown River Bridge.
- Buffalo Creek from the west at Lewisburg.
- Chillisquaque Creek from the northeast at West Chillisquaque Township 5.01 miles (8.06 km) upriver of its mouth.

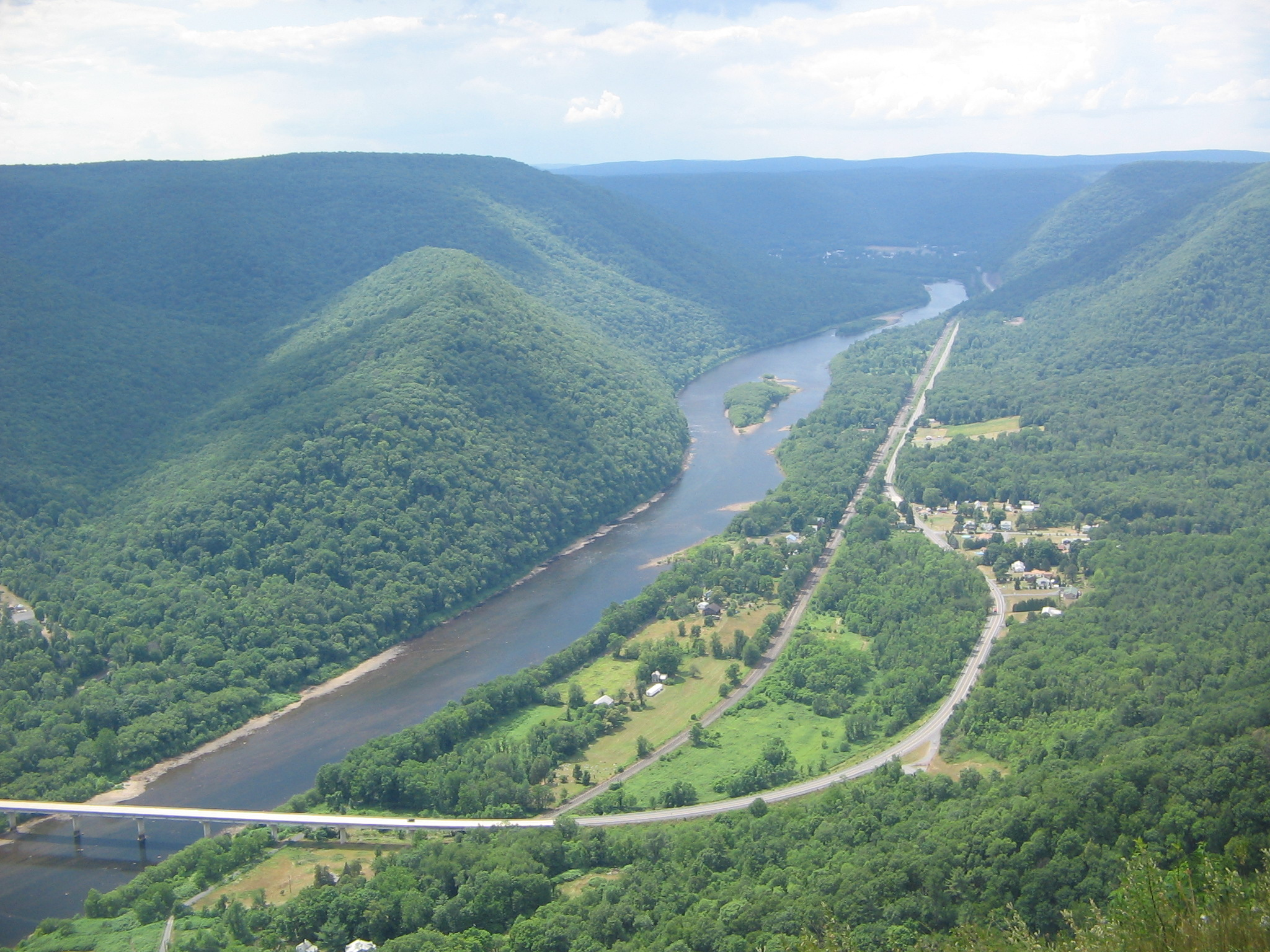
West Branch Susquehanna from Hyner View State Park in Clinton County, Pennsylvania

== History ==
Up through the early 19th century the river provided the principal canoe route across the Alleghenies connecting the Susquehanna and Ohio valleys, with a portage at Cherry Tree to Blacklick Creek, a tributary of the Conemaugh River. In the late 18th century, Cherry Tree marked the frontier between the Pennsylvania Colony and the Shawnee and Lenape lands to the west as specified by treaty.

The lands along the West Branch were vital hunting grounds and agricultural lands for Native Americans. During Pennsylvania's great lumbering era, the most significant log drive was conveyed on the West Branch of the Susquehanna River. The Susquehanna's West Branch Canal Division further shaped the corridor, linking towns and villages and providing vital opportunities for commerce. Finally, railroads in the corridor fused the links between communities and commerce within the corridor.

=== Early inhabitants ===
The first recorded inhabitants of the West Branch Susquehanna River valley were the Iroquoian-speaking Susquehannocks. Their name meant "people of the muddy river", from the Lenape name of the Susquehanna River, Siskuwihane (sisku "mud", hane "river"). Decimated by diseases and warfare, they had died out, moved away, or been assimilated into other tribes by the early 18th century. The lands of the West Branch Susquehanna River Valley were then chiefly occupied by the Munsee phratry of the Lenape (or Delaware) people and were under the nominal control of the Five (later Six) Nations of the Iroquois.

=== Colonial settlement ===
Madame Montour's village of Otstonwakin or Ostuagy was a vitally important location during the settlement of what is now Lycoming County. Her village at the mouth of Loyalsock Creek on the West Branch Susquehanna River was an important stopping point for the Moravian missionaries who were spreading the gospel throughout the wilderness of Pennsylvania during the 1740s. Count Zinzendorf, a missionary being guided by Conrad Weiser with the permission of Shikellamy, came to Ostuagy in 1742.

The British purchased land from the Iroquois in the Treaty of Fort Stanwix of 1768, opening what is now Lycoming County to settlement. However, the Line of Property (or Purchase Line) border defined by "Tiadaghton Creek" dividing colonial and Native American lands was disputed. The colonists claimed this was Pine Creek, the Iroquois and other tribes Lycoming Creek. The area between Pine and Lycoming creeks was disputed territory. The illegal settlers there were part of the "Fair Play Men" system of self-government, with their own Declaration of Independence from Britain on July 4, 1776.

In the American Revolutionary War, settlements throughout the Susquehanna valley were attacked by Loyalists and Native Americans allied with the British. After the Wyoming Valley battle and massacre in the summer of 1778 (near what is now Wilkes-Barre) and smaller local attacks, the "Big Runaway" occurred throughout the West Branch Susquehanna valley. Settlers fled feared and actual attacks by the British and their allies. Homes and fields were abandoned, with livestock driven along and a few possessions floated on rafts on the river east to Muncy, then further south to Sunbury. The abandoned property was burnt by the attackers. Some settlers soon returned, only to flee again in the summer of 1779 in the "Little Runaway". The Sullivan Expedition helped stabilize the area and encouraged resettlement, which continued after the war. In 1790, Timothy Matlack, Samuel Maclay and John Adlum were commissioned by the Supreme Executive Council of the Commonwealth of Pennsylvania to survey the headwaters of the Susquehanna and explore a route for a passageway to connect the West Branch with the waters of the Allegheny River.

The Fair Play Men were illegal settlers (squatters) who established their own system of self-rule from 1773 to 1785 in the West Branch Susquehanna River Valley of Pennsylvania. Because they settled in territory claimed by Native Americans, they had no recourse to the Pennsylvania colonial government. Accordingly, they established what was known as the Fair Play System, with three elected commissioners who ruled on land claims and other issues for the group. In a remarkable coincidence, the Fair Play Men made their own declaration of independence from Britain on July 4, 1776, beneath the "Tiadaghton Elm" on the banks of Pine Creek.

Fort Antes was a stockade surrounding the home of Colonel John Henry Antes, built circa 1778 in Revolutionary Pennsylvania in the United States. The fort was built under the direction of Colonel Antes, who was a member of the Pennsylvania militia. It was on the east side of Antes Creek, overlooking and on the left bank of the West Branch Susquehanna River on a plateau in Nippenose Township south of modern-day Jersey Shore in western Lycoming County. The local militia held the fort for a short period of time until it was ordered by Colonel Samuel Hunter to abandon Fort Antes during the Big Runaway. Despite being abandoned and attempts by the attacking British forces to burn it down, Fort Antes was one of only two structures in the valley to survive the Big Runaway.

=== Log boom ===
The Susquehanna Boom was a system of cribs in the West Branch Susquehanna River designed to hold timber in the river until it could be processed at one of the nearly 60 sawmills along the river between Lycoming and Loyalsock creeks in Lycoming County. The boom was constructed in 1846 under the supervision of James H. Perkins.

A boom is a chain or line of connected floating timbers extended across a river, lake, or harbor, so as to obstruct passage or catch floating objects. The Susquehanna Boom extended 7 miles (11 km) upstream from Duboistown to the village of Linden in Woodward Township. The boom was constructed by creating a series of man-made islands known as "cribs". These cribs built of local mountain stone and sunken timber were stretched diagonally across the river, beginning on the south side near Duboistown and ending on the north side near Linden. The boom was made of 352 separate cribs that were 22 feet (7 m) high. The boom was opened and closed at the upper end by a device known as a "sheer boom". It was 1,000 feet (300 m) long and was controlled with a hand-powered windlass. The sheer boom gathered the logs into the main boom that was capable of holding up to 300 million board feet (710,000 m^{3}) of logs. The lower end of the boom was where the logs were sorted. The mills in Williamsport, South Williamsport, and Duboistown each had their own distinctive brand burnt into the logs. The men working at the end of the boom would sort the logs according to their corresponding brand and float them into the correct holding pond along the bank of the river.

During the height of the lumber industry in Lycoming County, 1861–1891, the various mills produced 5.5 billion board feet (13 million m^{3}) of lumber. Williamsport became one of the most prosperous cities in Pennsylvania and in the United States. Men like James H. Perkins, Peter Herdic, and Mahlon Fisher became millionaires while many of the men who actually worked in the river struggled to survive on the wages paid to them by the lumber barons.

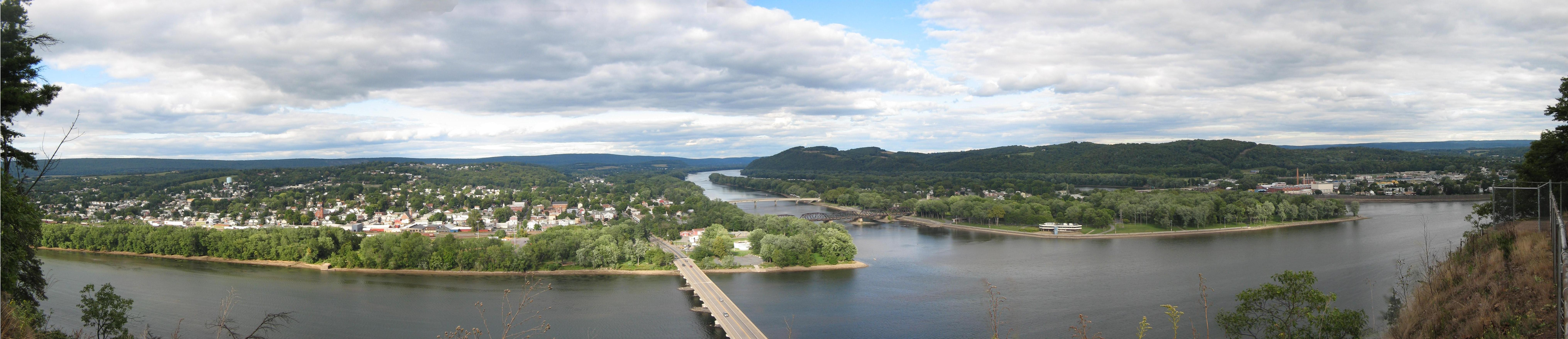
The confluence of the West Branch Susquehanna River (left) and North Branch (center) of the Susquehanna River, along with the borough of Northumberland (left) and city of Sunbury (far right). View is from the Shikellamy State Park Overlook and includes the Shikellamy State Park Marina unit on Packer Island (although the docks had already been taken in for the winter when this photo was taken).

== See also ==
- Shamokin Creek, next tributary of the Susquehanna River going downriver
- Lithia Springs Creek, next tributary of the Susquehanna River going upriver
- Hogback Bridge
- Bridge in Greenwood Township
- Parker Dam State Park
- List of rivers of Pennsylvania
- List of dams and reservoirs of the Susquehanna River
- List of crossings of the Susquehanna River
