= Fair Play Men =

Illegal settlers of western Pennsylvania

Tiadaghton Elm (Fair Play Men independence site)
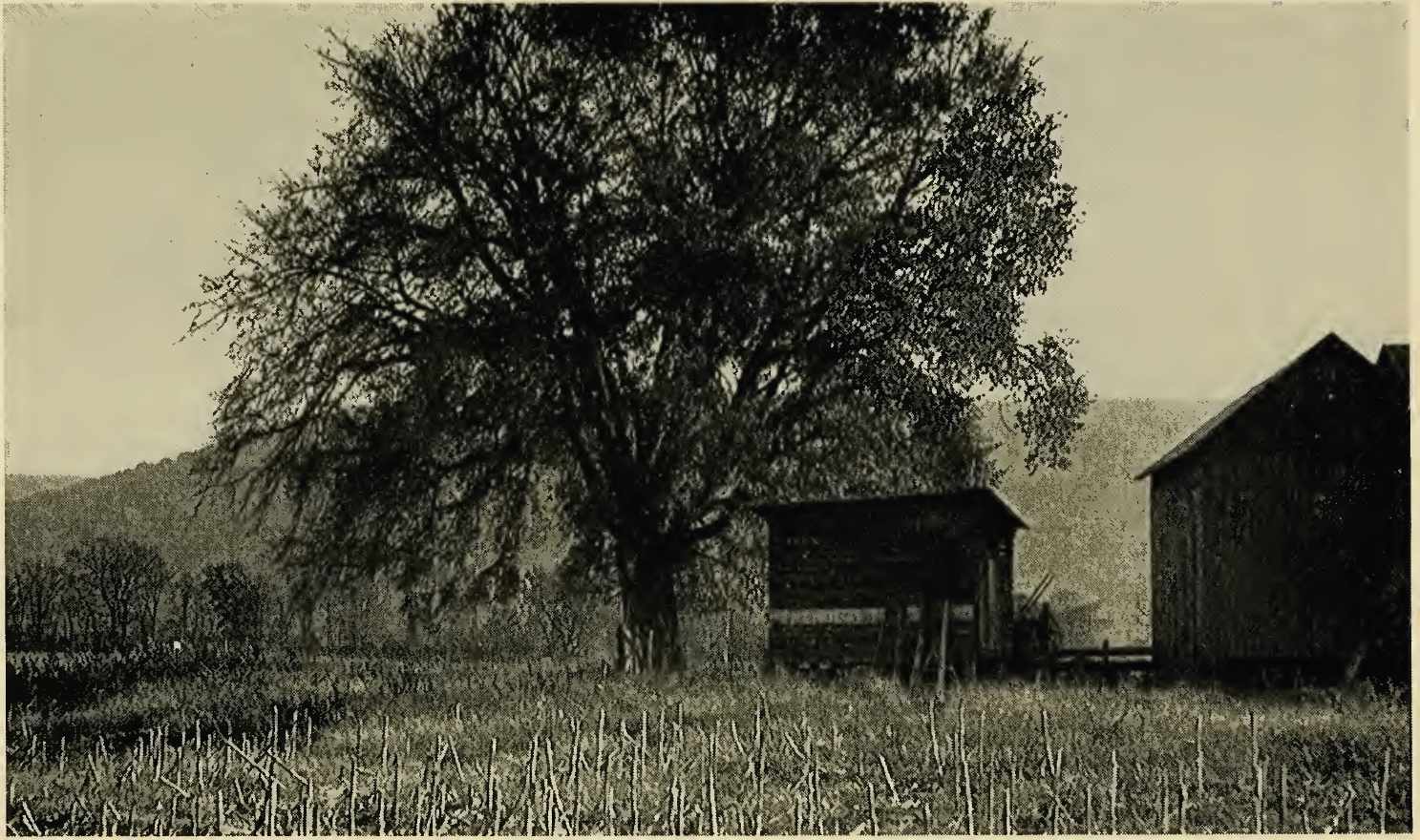
- The Tiadaghton Elm in 1939, site of the Fair Play Men's Declaration of Independence

- Location within Pennsylvania
- 41.18°N 77.27865°W
- Location: River Rd. (SR 1016 / old US 220), at Bonner Ln., SE of Avis, Pennsylvania
- Nearest city: Jersey Shore, Pennsylvania

The Fair Play Men were illegal settlers (squatters) who established their own system of self-rule from 1773 to 1785 in the West Branch Susquehanna River valley of Pennsylvania in what is now the United States. Because they settled in territory claimed by Native Americans, they had no recourse to the Pennsylvania colonial government. Accordingly they established what was known as the Fair Play System, with three elected commissioners who ruled on land claims and other issues for the group. In a remarkable coincidence, the Fair Play Men made their own declaration of independence from Britain on July 4, 1776 beneath the "Tiadaghton Elm" on the banks of Pine Creek.

== The 1768 Treaty of Fort Stanwix ==
The British colonial government purchased land from the Iroquois in the Treaty of Fort Stanwix of 1768, opening new lands in Pennsylvania and New York for settlement, including what is now Lycoming County, Pennsylvania. Lycoming County is about 100 mi (160 km) northwest of Philadelphia and about 165 mi (265 km) east-northeast of Pittsburgh.

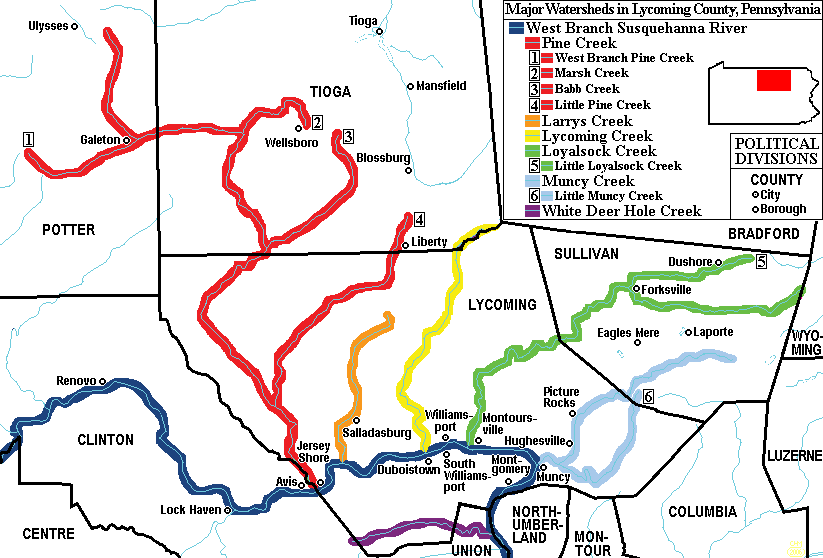
Map of the West Branch Susquehanna River (dark blue) and Major Streams in Lycoming County, Pennsylvania. Pine Creek (red) and Lycoming Creek (yellow) were each claimed to be "Tiadaghton Creek", the disputed boundary between Native American and colonial lands.

However, some of the treaty's Line of Property (or Purchase Line) border along the West Branch Susquehanna River was disputed. Part of the western border which divided colonial and Native American lands north of the river was defined by "Tiadaghton Creek". The colonists claimed this was Pine Creek (further west, giving them more land), the Iroquois and other tribes claimed it was Lycoming Creek (further east). The colonial government recognized the tribal claim and so all land west of Lycoming Creek was considered Native American and off bounds for settlement. Despite this, illegal settlers settled in the disputed area along the West Branch Susquehanna River, the west bank of Lycoming Creek, Larrys Creek, and especially at the mouth of Pine Creek.

== The Fair Play system ==
The settlers elected three commissioners each March who were responsible that everyone was dealt with fairly (hence the name "fair play"). Most of their rulings seem to have dealt with property issues, but they dealt with any legal or criminal cases in the Fair Play area. They granted permission for new settlers to enter the area, could take away a settler's land claim if they were absent more than six weeks (except for military service), and could expel a person (by setting them adrift in a canoe on the river). The commissioners' decisions were final and supposedly were never challenged. In 1776 the three commissioners of the Fair Play Men were Bratton Caldwell, John Walker, and James Brandon. They are the only commissioners whose names are now known and it is conjectured that they were the only three for the duration of the Fair Play system.

== The Pine Creek Declaration of Independence ==
The American Revolutionary War started in April 1775. Men from the area volunteered to serve in the Continental Army that year. Most of the settlers in the West Branch Susquehanna River valley were for the revolution. On July 4, 1776, the Fair Play Men met on the west bank of Pine Creek near the mouth of the West Branch Susquehanna River and declared their Independence from Britain. The traditional site for the declaration was beneath the "Tiadaghton Elm" tree, which stood until the 1970s in what is now Clinton County, Pennsylvania. This was west of Pine Creek in what was clearly Native American land.

Afterwards the Fair Play Men met in their own Fort Horn (near the elm tree) and chose to send two men with the news to Philadelphia, not knowing that the Second Continental Congress had declared independence there the same day. The two messengers, Patrick Gilfillen and Michael Quigley Jr., were ambushed and robbed by Native Americans and later jailed by Loyalists, but escaped and made it to Philadelphia on July 10. They returned a short time later to bring word of the United States Declaration of Independence.

== The Big Runaway ==
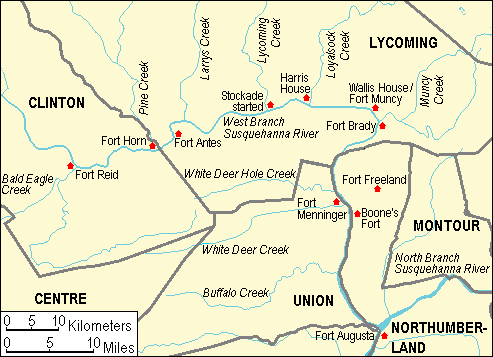
Map of fortifications and streams in north-central Pennsylvania during the Big Runaway. The Fair Play Men had two small forts: Fort Horn (at the mouth of Pine Creek) and Fort Reid (at the mouth of Bald Eagle Creek).

In the American Revolutionary War, settlements throughout the Susquehanna valley were attacked by Loyalists and Native Americans allied with the British. In the early summer of 1778 news came of a group of Native American warriors, perhaps accompanied by Loyalist and British soldiers, heading for the West Branch Susquehanna River valley to destroy settlements. There were many smaller incidents of violence against settlers, but on June 10, 1778 a party of sixteen settlers were attacked in what is now Williamsport. In what became known as the "Plum Tree Massacre", twelve of the sixteen were killed and scalped, including two women and six children. The Wyoming Valley Massacre occurred on July 3, 1778 (near what is now Wilkes-Barre). This news caused the local authorities to order the evacuation of the whole West Branch valley.

At least two riders braved attacks to warn their fellow settlers. Rachel Silverthorn volunteered (when no man would) to leave the relative safety of Fort Muncy (in Muncy Township). She rode along Muncy Creek and the Wyalusing Path and warned settlers, who fled to the safety of Fort Muncy. Her own family's cabin was later burnt to the ground. Robert Covenhoven, who had served under George Washington in the Continental Army, rode west along the ridge of Bald Eagle Mountain to warn settlers at Fort Antes (opposite what is now Jersey Shore) and the western part of the valley. Covenhoven is listed as a Fair Play Man and one of the signers of the Tiadaghton Declaration of Independence.

Most settlers had already gathered at five small forts for safety, but now the forts and the settlers' homes and fields were abandoned, with livestock driven along and a few possessions floated on rafts on the river east to what is now Muncy, then further south to Fort Augusta at what is now Sunbury. The abandoned property was burnt by the attackers. Some settlers reported fleeing at night with the glow of their burning settlements lighting the sky behind them. Fort Horn and the other Fair Play Men settlements were all destroyed.

Some settlers soon returned, only to flee a second time in the summer of 1779 in the "Little Runaway", when another force of Native Americans and British soldiers attacked the valley again. Also in 1779, Sullivan's Expedition destroyed at least forty Native American villages in New York and helped reduce attacks to stabilize the area and encourage resettlement.

== After the war ==
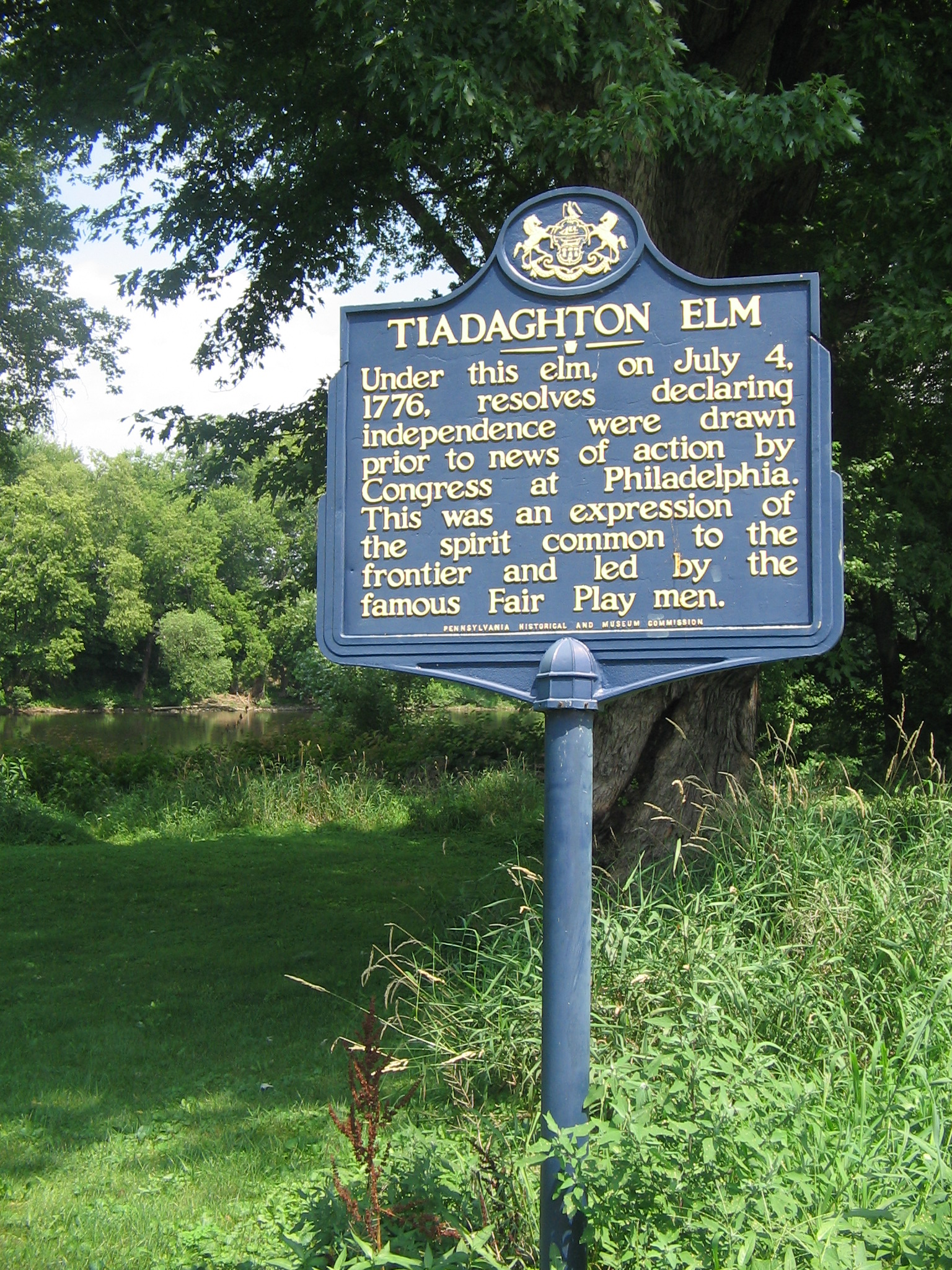
Pennsylvania Historical and Museum Commission marker at the site of the Tiadaghton Elm in 2006; the elm died in the 1970s.

The Fair Play Men and their system continued after the end of the war. In 1784, a second Treaty at Fort Stanwix ceded the Native American lands to the new government of the United States (and recognized Pine Creek as "Tiadaghton Creek"). When the land office opened in May 1785, the Fair Play men were no longer illegal settlers and their existing land claims were recognized.

== Legacy ==
There are no original written records from the Fair Play Men or their Declaration of Independence, although many later accounts exist. The two main theories that have been advanced to explain this are: first that any records were destroyed in the Great Runaway (only one house survived in the whole West Branch valley); or second that they kept no records to avoid incriminating themselves as they were illegal settlers. The riders to Philadelphia are supposed to have lost their copy of the Declaration of Independence when ambushed or later when jailed.

In the absence of primary written records, some modern historians have doubted whether the actual Tiadaghton Declaration of Independence took place on July 4, 1776, or whether it was made before knowledge of the United States Declaration of Independence in Philadelphia reached the Fair Play Men.

The closest borough to the "Tiadaghton Elm" site is Jersey Shore in Lycoming County, which has a week-long Town Meeting each year over the Fourth of July. The Town Meeting includes a procession of people dressed as the Fair Play Men and a Tiadaghton Elm ceremony.
