= Wellsboro and Corning Railroad =

American railroad company

Coordinates: 41.788360°N 77.302786°W

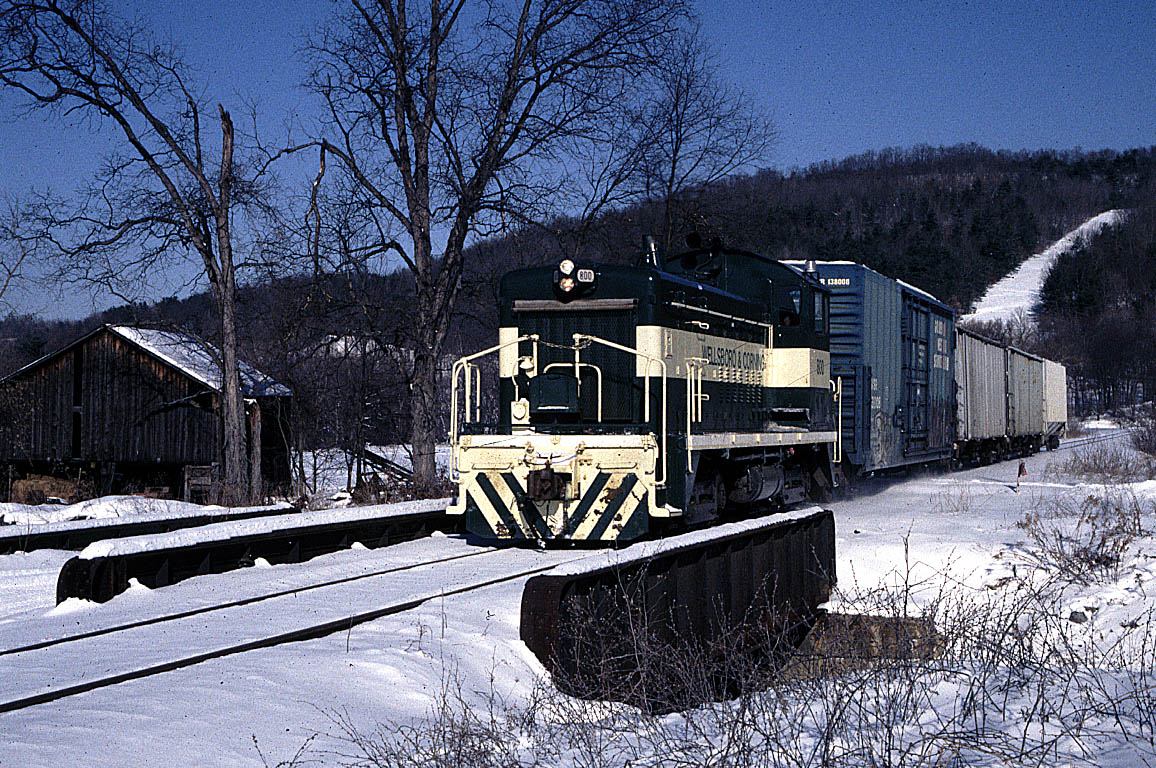
- WCOR train in 1995

Overview
- Parent company: Genesee & Wyoming
- Headquarters: Exton, Pennsylvania
- Reporting mark: WCOR
- Locale: Pennsylvania and New York
- Dates of operation: 1993–

Technical
- Track gauge: 4 ft 8 1/2 in (1,435 mm) standard gauge

The Wellsboro and Corning Railroad (reporting mark WCOR) is a 35-mile (56 km) shortline railroad that operates between Wellsboro, Pennsylvania and Corning, New York, passing through Tioga and Lawrenceville. It parallels Pennsylvania Route 287 and U.S. Route 15, following the valleys of Marsh Creek, Crooked Creek, and the Tioga River. The railroad connects with Norfolk Southern's Southern Tier Line at Corning.

The line was formerly part of the New York Central Railroad system, later acquired by Conrail, who sold the line to Growth Resources of Wellsboro in 1992. WCOR began operations in 1993, and was controlled by Richard Robey, owner of the North Shore Railroad System, until January 2008, when Myles Group of Exton, Pennsylvania bought the company. In April 2012, RailAmerica purchased a 20% share in the railroad. The Tioga Central Railroad operated tourist trains over the line between Wellsboro and Tioga until 2022. As of 2023, the line is owned by holding company Genesee & Wyoming.

== History ==
Most of the WCOR was once part of a main line connecting to the New York Central Railroad's Water Level Route at Lyons, New York. The north end of what would become the WCOR was built in 1841 by the Tioga Coal, Iron Mining & Manufacturing Company (later reorganized as the Blossburg & Corning Railroad), and extended from Corning south to Lawrenceville. The south end from Lawrenceville to Wellsboro was built by the Wellsboro & Lawrenceville Railroad, opening in 1871. The two railroads were combined in 1873 as the Corning, Cowanesque & Antrim Railroad. The main line, finished in 1883 by the Jersey Shore, Pine Creek & Buffalo Railway, branched off north of Wellsboro. The Corning, Cowanesque & Antrim was leased to Fall Brook Railroad in 1892, which was then leased to New York Central in 1899. Its successor the Geneva, Corning & Southern Railroad was absorbed by New York Central in 1914.

The publicly owned and operated Conrail retained the line when it began operations in 1976, but later abandoned it south of Wellsboro Junction, through Pine Creek Gorge (also known as the Grand Canyon of Pennsylvania), turning the line into a minor branch. Conrail sold the line to Growth Resources of Wellsboro in December 1992, who began operating the WCOR in January 1993. The Tioga Central Railroad, which had operated freight in Tioga County, New York until May 1992 (when the Owego & Harford Railway took over), began operating tourist trains in May 1994.

The Wellsboro and Corning Railroad was acquired by Genesee & Wyoming, a shortline railroad holding company, in 2012.

== Marcellus Shale and railroad operations ==
The railroad's geographic orientation covers one of the largest and most active portions of the Marcellus Shale formation, which is being actively explored for natural gas. This has resulted in customers referring to the railroad as the "Main Line to the Marcellus".

The railroad had its busiest year in more than two decades in 2009, fueled by demand from a booming natural gas industry in the region, which uses sand in hydraulic fracturing operations. The sand-hauling portion of the railroad's operations began in 2009, and made up 80% of their business in 2010.

== See also ==
- List of Pennsylvania railroads
