= Jersey Shore, Pine Creek and State Line Railroad =

The Jersey Shore, Pine Creek and State Line Railroad was a paper railroad planned in northern Pennsylvania.

The railroad was incorporated on April 11, 1853, to run from Jersey Shore, in Lycoming County, to the New York state line, up Pine Creek through Tioga, Potter and McKean Counties, or turning at Gaines from Pine Creek up Long Run to reach the state line. Alexander H. McHenry, a prominent local surveyor, was one of the original incorporators. Another was John A. Gamble, a resident of Jersey Shore and state Canal Commissioner. The charter was amended on April 4, 1854, to allow the railroad to build up the "third fork of Pine Creek" and down Crooked Creek to connect with the Tioga Railroad near Tioga. Another supplement, on March 25, 1856, allowed the railroad to build a branch up the "first fork of Pine Creek" to the Larrys Creek Plank Road at English Center and on up Blockhouse Creek to reach Blossburg, site of coal mines and the terminus of the Tioga Railroad. Despite this legislative activity, little work took place, and the company was quiescent for several years.

A revival of the corporation took place in 1864, directed by Francis Hughes. The charter was amended on April 14, 1864, to permit the construction of the branch to Tioga via Marsh Creek (the "third fork of Pine Creek") and Crooked Creek once the main line had been located as far as Manchester, on the third fork, and also allowed it to construct branches to the Philadelphia and Erie Railroad from Jersey Shore, or to any other railroad in Clinton or Lycoming Counties. A final amendment to the charter on March 21, 1865, allowed the company to change its name. While a new survey was run, the enterprise again failed to go forward.

A local history states that the "name was merged into the Jersey Shore, Pine Creek and Buffalo Railway" in 1870, but that railroad possessed a separate charter, and no corporate merger ever seems to have taken place. That company did succeed in building a line from Jersey Shore up Pine Creek and then Marsh Creek to a junction with the Fall Brook Railway, which had built south from Tioga. Some grading was done along Pine Creek to the west of Marsh Creek, but was sold to the Coudersport and Port Allegany Railroad and never completed as a through line.
