= Nittany and Bald Eagle Railroad =

Railway line in the United States of America

Overview
- Headquarters: Northumberland, PA
- Reporting mark: NBER
- Locale: Pennsylvania
- Dates of operation: 1984–

Technical
- Track gauge: 4 ft 8 1/2 in (1,435 mm) standard gauge

Other
- Website: Nittany and Bald Eagle Railroad

The Nittany and Bald Eagle Railroad (reporting mark NBER) is a short line railroad that operates 73 miles (117 km) of track in Blair, Centre, and Clinton counties in Pennsylvania in the United States. It is part of the North Shore Railroad System.

The line runs generally northeast between Tyrone (in Blair County) and Lock Haven (in Clinton County). Other communities served include Port Matilda, Milesburg (both in Centre County), and Mill Hall (in Clinton County). There is a spur at Milesburg that runs southeast to Bellefonte, then splits, with a track going northeast to Pleasant Gap and another going southwest to Lemont and State College (all in Centre County). There are 8 miles (13 km) of track in Blair County, 60 miles (97 km) in Centre County, and 5 miles (8.0 km) in Clinton County.

The rail line follows Bald Eagle Creek northeast in Centre and Clinton counties, and runs roughly parallel to U.S. Route 220 between Tyrone and Milesburg, and parallel to Pennsylvania Route 150 between Milesburg and Lock Haven. The spur to Bellefonte follows Pennsylvania Route 144 and the line from Lemont to Pleasant Gap follows Pennsylvania Route 26.

There are connections to the Norfolk Southern Railway at both Tyrone and Lock Haven as well as an indirect connection to Canadian Pacific Railway.

The system has trackage rights via the Norfolk Southern line. These allow the Nittany and Bald Eagle Railroad to connect via Lock Haven to the east and south with the Lycoming Valley Railroad at Muncy and the village of Linden in Woodward Township, Lycoming County, the Union County Industrial Railroad at Milton, the North Shore Railroad at Northumberland, and the Shamokin Valley Railroad at Sunbury.

== History ==
The line operated by the Nittany and Bald Eagle Railroad was formerly the Bald Eagle Valley Branch of the Pennsylvania Railroad Tyrone Division, later part of the Penn Central, and then Conrail. SEDA-COG JRA (Susquehanna Economic Development Association - Council of Governments Joint Rail Authority) was formed in July, 1983 to continue to provide rail service to communities whose rail lines Conrail had decided to abandon. In 1984 the JRA took over the line when Conrail abandoned it, and the Nittany and Bald Eagle Railroad was born (along with the North Shore Railroad). In 1989, more track was purchased, extending the Nittany and Bald Eagle line to Lock Haven. The name of the railroad comes from Mount Nittany in Centre County and Bald Eagle Creek.

== Bellefonte Historical Railroad Society (BHRS) ==
The Bellefonte Historical Railroad is a tourist/excursion railroad that also uses the line operated by the Nittany and Bald Eagle Railroad. Because Norfolk Southern also uses the line increasingly for coal and other traffic, the Bellefonte Historical Railroad "is thought to be the only volunteer operation in the country that runs in conjunction with a Class I railroad". Unfortunately this also hampers their ability to operate on the main line at times, as Class I traffic has the right of way.

The Bellefonte Historical Railroad has limited operations at this time and hosts special excursion runs. Their website is http://www.bellefontetrain.org.

== Awards ==
- In 2003, the Nittany and Bald Eagle Railroad won the American Shortline & Regional Railroad Association (ASLRRA) 2003 marketing award.
- In 2004, it was named "Short Line Railroad of the Year" by Railway Age magazine

== See also ==
- List of Pennsylvania railroads
- Stourbridge Railroad (also operated by Robey Railroads)

Preceded by San Joaquin Valley Railroad	Short Line Railroad of the Year; 2004	Succeeded by Cedar Rapids and Iowa City Railway
