= North Shore Railroad (Pennsylvania) =

Short line railroad in Pennsylvania

Overview
- Headquarters: Northumberland, PA
- Reporting mark: NSHR
- Locale: Pennsylvania
- Dates of operation: 1984–

Technical
- Track gauge: 4 ft 8 1/2 in (1,435 mm) standard gauge

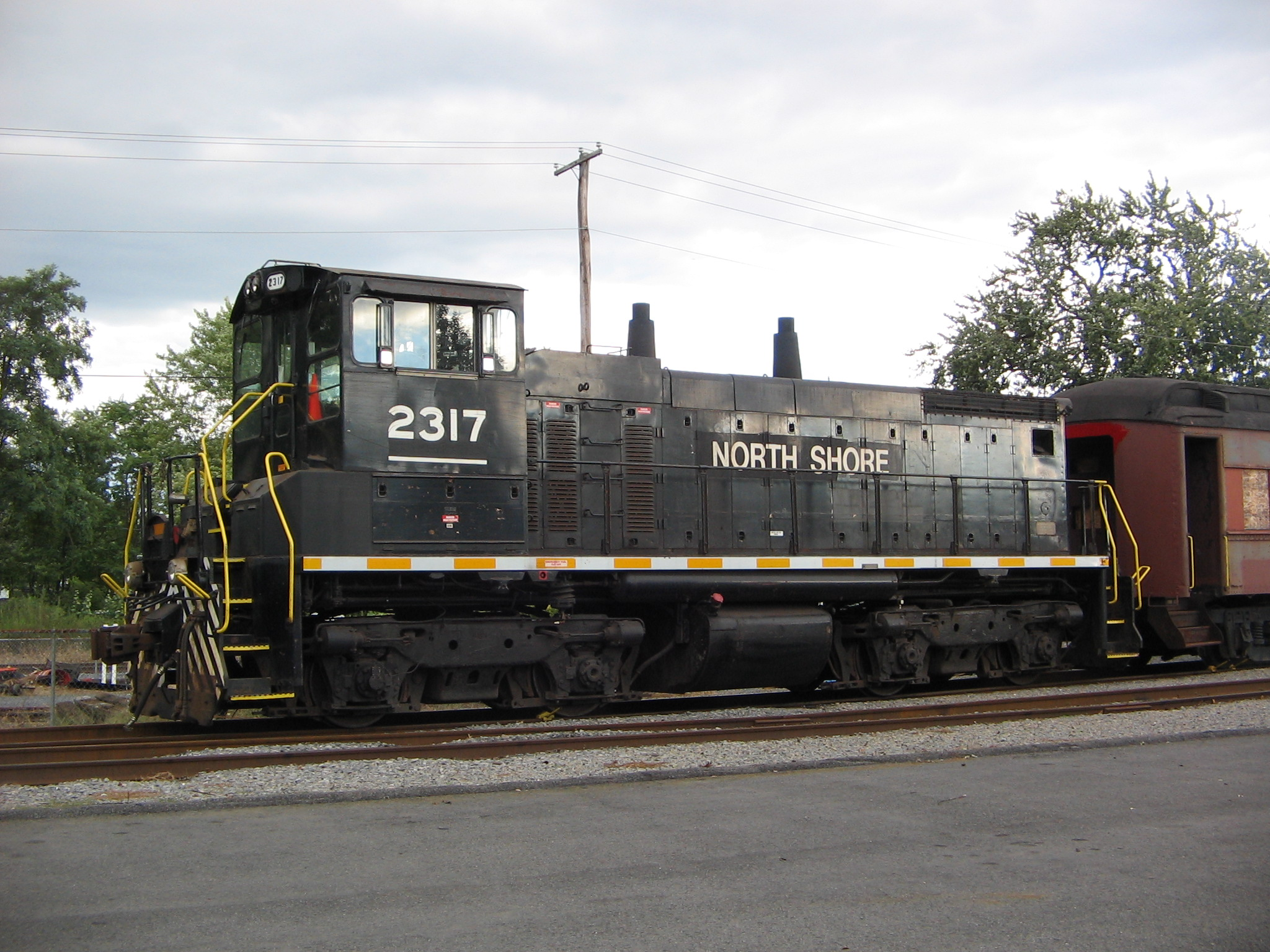
Engine 2317 at the North Shore Railroad corporate headquarters in Northumberland, Pennsylvania

The North Shore Railroad (reporting mark NSHR) is a short line railroad that operates 49.8 miles (80.1 km) of track in Snyder, Northumberland, Montour, Columbia, and Luzerne counties in Pennsylvania in the United States. The line runs generally northeast between Northumberland (in Northumberland County) and the unincorporated village of Beach Haven in Salem Township (in Luzerne County).

Other communities served include Selinsgrove, Kreamer (both in Snyder County), Danville (in Montour County), Bloomsburg, and Berwick (both in Columbia County).

The rail line runs generally northeast along the north shore of the North Branch of the Susquehanna River, roughly following U.S. Route 11. There are 10 miles (16 km) of SEDA-COG Joint Rail Authority track in Northumberland County, 12 miles (19 km) in Montour County, and 15 in Columbia County. Beach Haven is just east of Berwick and the Columbia County - Luzerne County line. The Selinsgrove Branch runs generally west across the Susquehanna River for 9 miles (14 km) to Kreamer, where the rail line terminates.

The corporate offices are located in Northumberland, where there is a connection to the Norfolk Southern Railway line.

== North Shore Railroad System ==
The North Shore Railroad gives its name to the North Shore Railroad System, which includes the following short lines:

- Juniata Valley Railroad (JVRR)*
- Lycoming Valley Railroad (LVRR)*
- Nittany and Bald Eagle Railroad (NBER)*
- North Shore Railroad (NSHR)*
- Shamokin Valley Railroad (SVRR)*
- Union County Industrial Railroad (UCIR)

The first five railroads (those marked with an asterisk, *) are owned by SEDA-COG JRA (Susquehanna Economic Development Association - Council of Governments Joint Rail Authority) and operated under contract by Robey Railroads, a private company. The North Shore and the Nittany and Bald Eagle Railroads were the first two railroads owned by the SEDA-COG JRA. Robey Railroads also operates UCIR. As of 2006, there are plans by Robey to consolidate these six lines as the Susquehanna Railroad Corporation, a non-operating holding company.

The system has trackage rights via the Norfolk Southern line. These allow the North Shore Railroad to connect to the south with the Shamokin Valley Railroad (at Sunbury) and the Selinsgrove Branch (at Selinsgrove Junction), and to the north and west with the Union County Industrial Railroad (at Milton), the Lycoming Valley Railroad (at Muncy and at Linden) and the Nittany and Bald Eagle Railroad (at Lock Haven).

== History ==
The North Shore Railroad's line first was built in 1852 as part of the Lackawanna and Bloomsburg Railroad. This was in turn acquired by the Delaware, Lackawanna and Western Railroad in 1873. The DL&W merged with the Erie Railroad in 1960, forming the Erie Lackawanna Railroad, and was absorbed into Conrail in 1976.

SEDA-COG JRA was formed in July, 1983 to continue to provide rail service to communities whose rail lines Conrail had decided to abandon. In 1984 the JRA took over the line along the north shore of the Susquehanna River from Northumberland to Beach Haven and renamed it the "North Shore Railroad".

On May 4, 2022, the SEDA-COG JRA purchased the Selinsgrove Industrial Track from Norfolk Southern for $371,200, adding 9 miles of track to the North Shore Railroad system.

== See also ==
- List of Pennsylvania railroads
- Stourbridge Railroad (operated by Robey Railroads 1990-2006)
- Wellsboro and Corning Railroad (operated by Robey Railroads until 2008)
