= Shawmut Line =

Shawmut Line can mean:

- Pittsburg and Shawmut Railroad, also known as the Shawmut Line
- Pittsburg, Shawmut and Northern Railroad, also known as the Shawmut Line
- Shawmut Branch of the MBTA Red Line in Boston, Massachusetts, formerly the Shawmut Branch Railroad
