= Shamokin Valley Railroad =

Railroad in Pennsylvania, USA

Overview
- Headquarters: Northumberland, Pennsylvania
- Reporting mark: SVRR
- Locale: Pennsylvania
- Dates of operation: 1989–

Technical
- Track gauge: 4 ft 8 1/2 in (1,435 mm) standard gauge

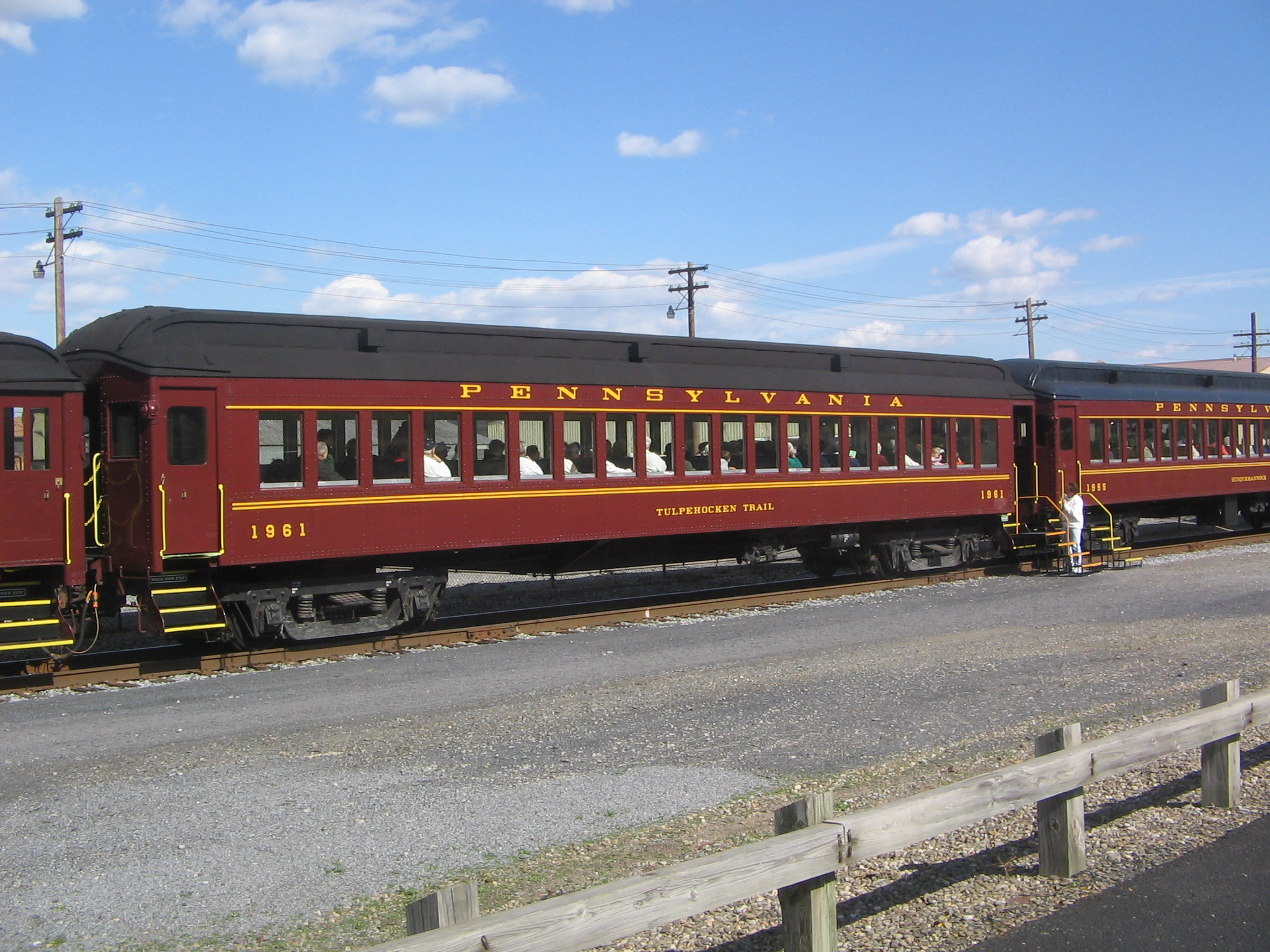
Restored 1920s Pennsylvania Railroad passenger cars used for tourist excursions on the Shamokin Valley Railroad.

The Shamokin Valley Railroad (reporting mark SVRR) is a short line railroad that operates 27 miles of track in southern Northumberland County, Pennsylvania in the United States. It is part of the North Shore Railroad System.

The line runs generally southeast between Sunbury and the unincorporated village of Mount Carmel Junction (just east of the borough of Mount Carmel in Mount Carmel Township). Other communities served include the villages of Paxinos (in Shamokin Township) and Weigh Scales (in Ralpho Township), and the city of Shamokin. The rail line runs east from Sunbury, then turns south through Paxinos and Weigh Scales to Shamokin, where it turns east again, always along or near Shamokin Creek and roughly following the route of Pennsylvania Route 61. It interchanges with the Reading Blue Mountain and Northern Railroad in Locust Summit.

The corporate offices are located in Northumberland, Pennsylvania. There is a connection to the Norfolk Southern Railway at Sunbury.

The system has trackage rights via the Norfolk Southern line. These allow the Shamokin Valley Railroad to connect to the north and west with the North Shore Railroad (at Northumberland), the Union County Industrial Railroad (at Milton), the Lycoming Valley Railroad at Muncy and the village of Linden (in Woodward Township, Lycoming County, and to the Nittany and Bald Eagle Railroad at Lock Haven.

== History ==
The line operated by the Shamokin Valley Railroad was formerly part of Conrail. SEDA-COG JRA (Susquehanna Economic Development Association - Council of Governments Joint Rail Authority) was formed in July, 1983 to continue to provide rail service to communities whose rail lines Conrail had decided to abandon. In 1989 the JRA took over the line when Conrail abandoned it, and the Shamokin Valley Railroad was born as its third railroad.

== See also ==
- List of Pennsylvania railroads
- Stourbridge Railroad (also operated by Robey Railroads)
