= Tioga Central Railroad =

Coordinates: 41.788323°N 77.30379°W

Tioga Central
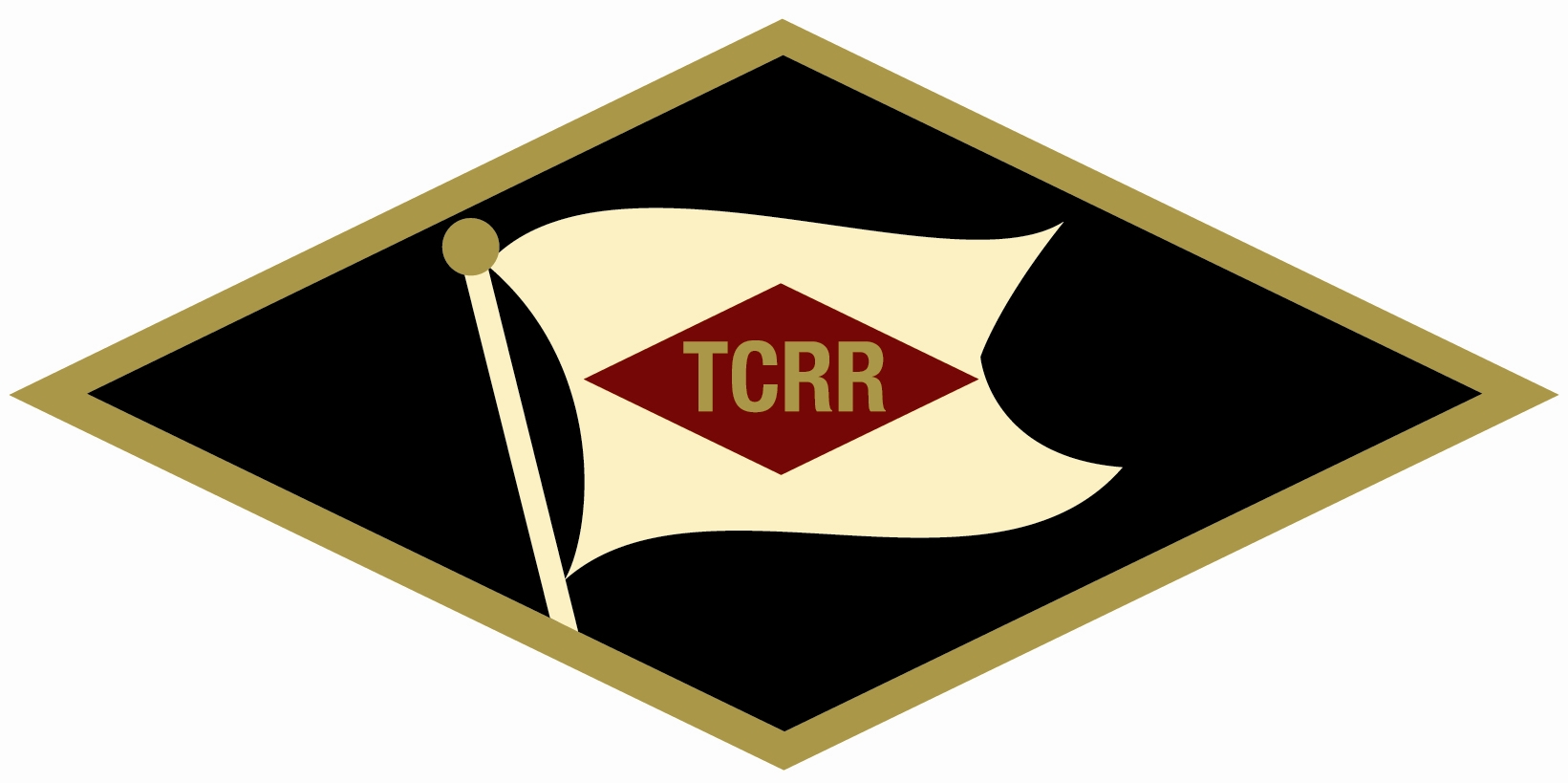

Overview
- Headquarters: Exton, Pennsylvania
- Locale: Tioga County, Pennsylvania
- Dates of operation: 1984–2019

Technical
- Track gauge: 4 ft 8 1/2 in (1,435 mm) standard gauge
- Length: 17 miles (27 km)

The Tioga Central Railroad was a heritage railroad that was formed in 1984 to operate seasonal passenger excursions on former Lehigh Valley Railroad track owned by Tioga County between Owego, Flemingville, and Newark Valley, N.Y. The operation later relocated to a portion of the Wellsboro and Corning Railroad between Wellsboro, Pennsylvania and Corning, New York. During the tourist season, which lasted from June to October, it operated excursion trains on a sector of this line, from Wellsboro, Pennsylvania to Tioga, Pennsylvania.

Due to COVID-19 capacity restrictions, the line suspended passenger operations during 2020 and 2021. In 2022 the railroad was reported to have permanently closed and its website was offline.

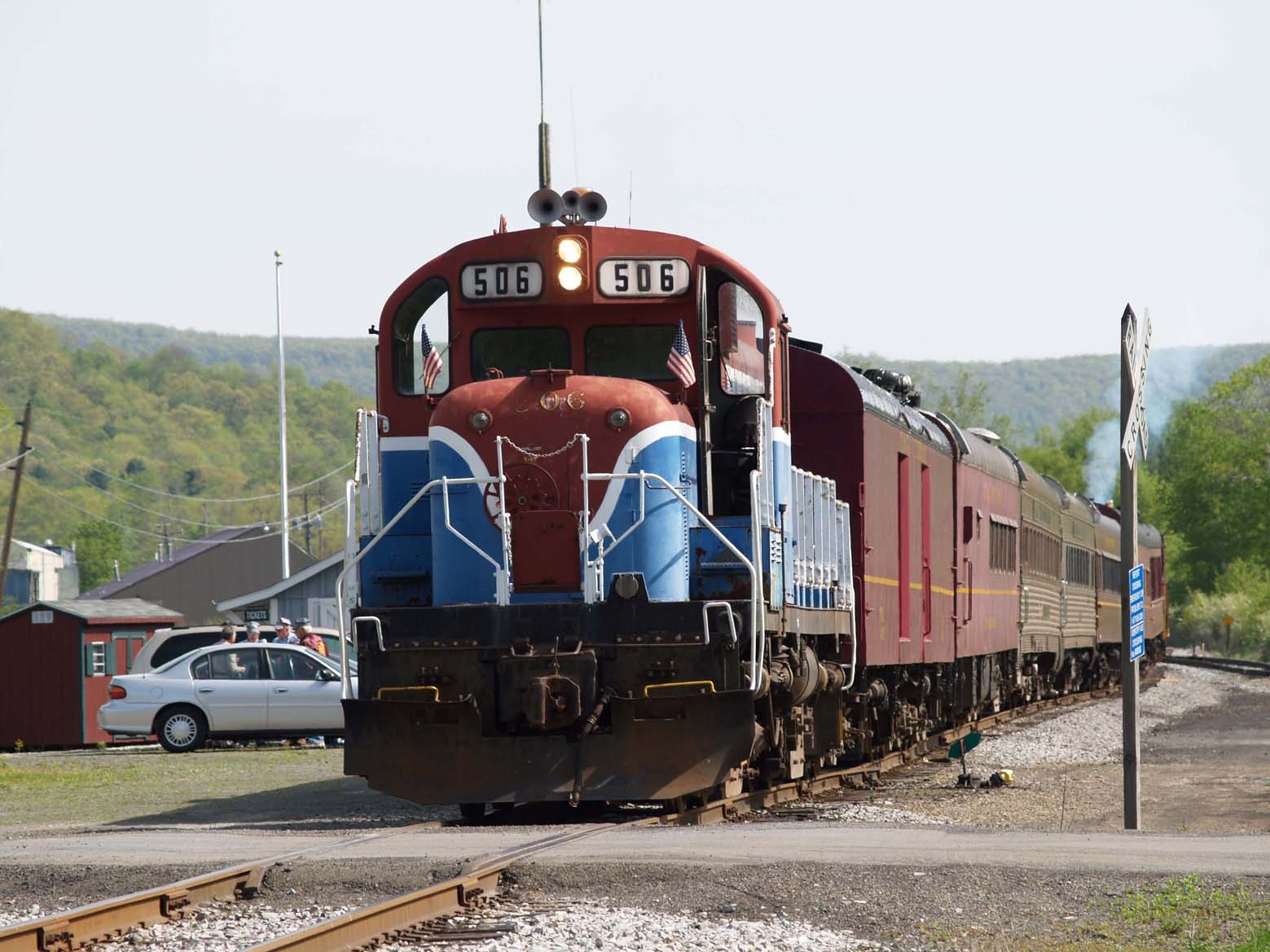
Tioga Central Railroad Engine No. 506 waiting to depart for a Saturday excursion

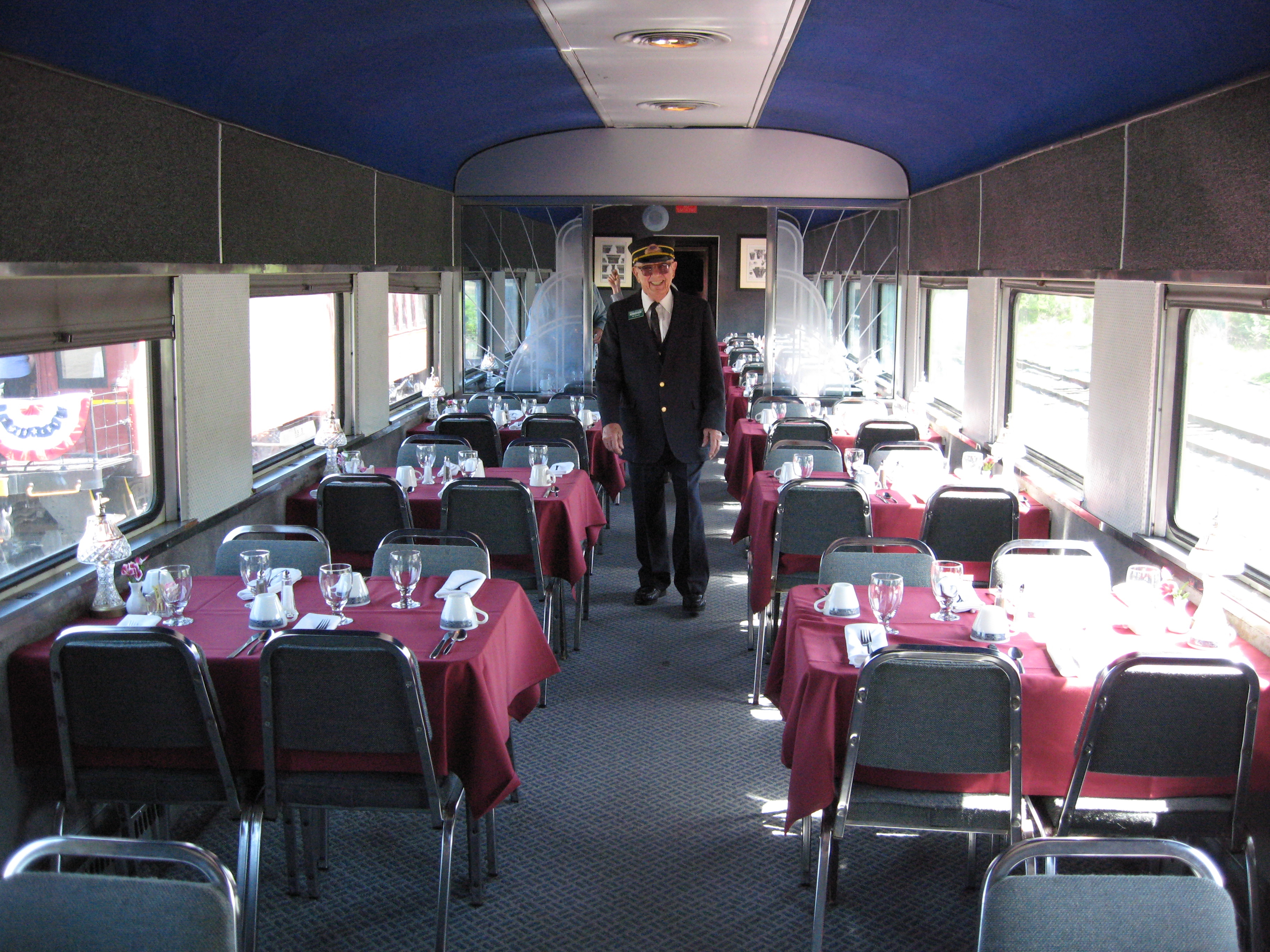
Dinner car for the All American BBQ Train with Ned, one of Tioga Central's conductors

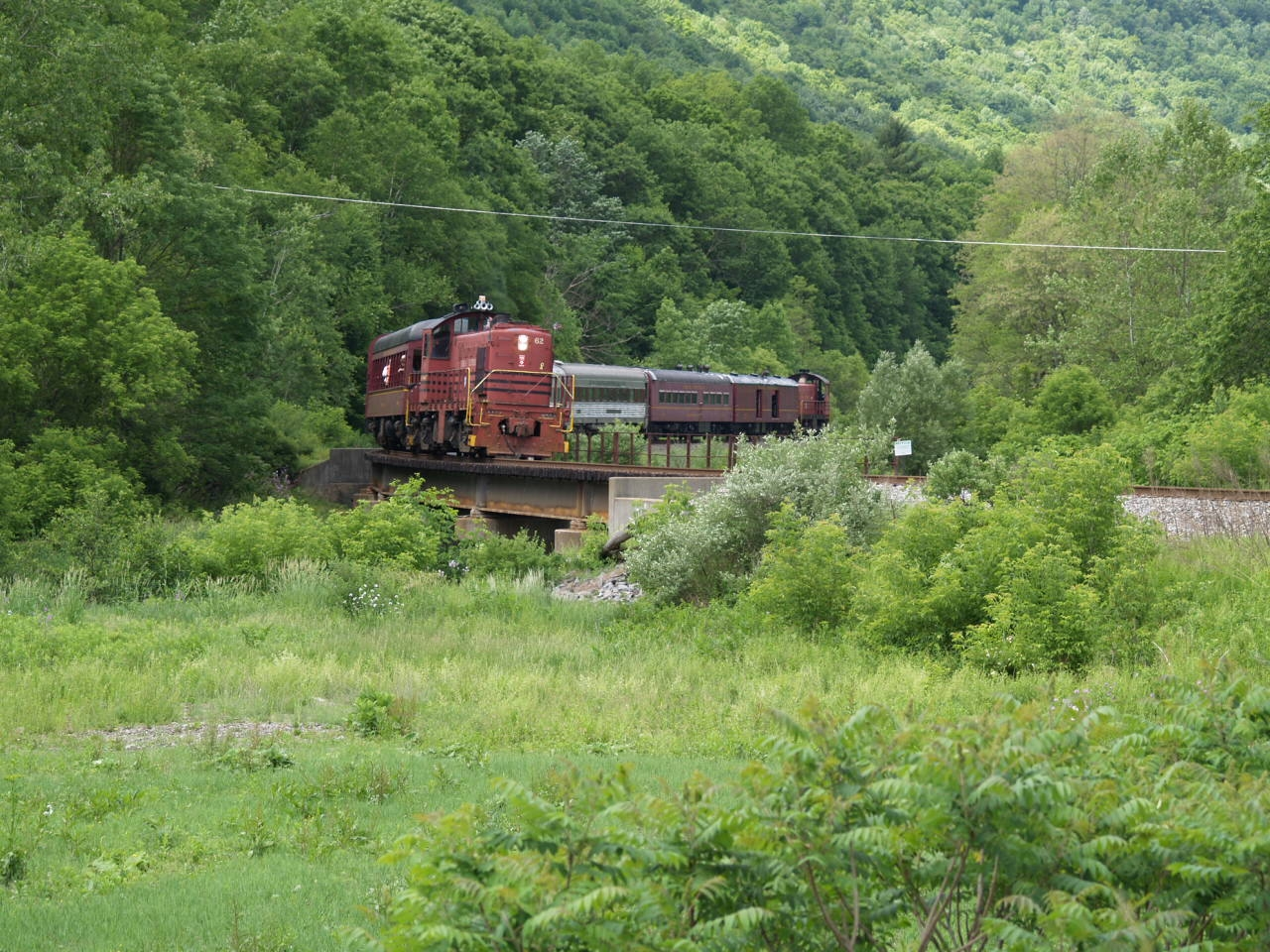
Tioga Central coming over Lawrenceville Bridge

== Rolling stock ==
- 14—An ALCO S-2. Built in 1947 in Schenectady, NY. #14 is a turbo-charged 6-cylinder, 1000 horsepower, 539 motor unit with Blunt trucks and friction bearings. It was acquired by the Tioga Central Railroad in 1984. Sold to Livonia, Avon and Lakeville Railroad in 2014. Currently active as LAL 14.
- 47—An ALCO RS-1. Built in 1945 for Washington Terminal Company. Became Amtrak #47 in 1984. Purchased by Tioga Central Railroad in 1986. Scrapped at Wellsboro in 2014.
- 62—An ALCO RS-1. Built in 1950, is a turbo-charged 6-cylinder, 1,000 horsepower (750 kW) unit with friction bearing trucks. First used on the Washington Union Terminal Railroad in Washington, DC. Purchased for service by the Wellsboro & Corning Railroad in 2007. Scrapped at Wellsboro in 2014.
- 240—An ALCO RS-1. Built in 1945 for New York, Susquehanna & Western Railroad. Purchased in 1980s by the Tioga Central and restored to NYS&W maroon and silver paint scheme with TCRR markings. Scrapped at Wellsboro in 2014.
- 506—An ALCO RS-3. First built as an ALCO RS3 for the Delaware & Hudson RR in 1952. Rebuilt in 1975 as an RS3U with a 2,000 horsepower (1,500 kW), turbo-charged V-12-cylinder unit with 26 brakes, dynamic brakes and GG bearings. Acquired by the Tioga Central Railroad in 1989 and renumbered #506. Sold to Livonia Avon & Lakeville Railroad and then to their sister railroad, The Western New York & Pennsylvania. It was in service as WNYP 406.
