= Jersey Shore, Pine Creek and Buffalo Railway =

Former American railroad

Overview
- Headquarters: Wellsboro
- Locale: Tioga County, Pennsylvania
- Dates of operation: 1883–1884
- Successor: Pine Creek Railway

Technical
- Track gauge: 4 ft 8 1/2 in (1,435 mm) standard gauge

The Jersey Shore, Pine Creek and Buffalo Railway was a railroad built in the early 1880s to give the New York Central and Hudson River Railroad access to the coal regions around Clearfield, Pennsylvania, United States.

It was originally planned as part of a connecting line between the East Coast of the United States and Buffalo, New York.

== Reading sponsorship ==
The railroad was incorporated on February 17, 1870 to run from the vicinity of Williamsport to Jersey Shore, up Pine Creek and down the Allegheny River to Port Allegany, as part of a route to Buffalo. While it was organized under a new charter, this represented a continuation of the Jersey Shore, Pine Creek and State Line Railroad project; that corporation had made surveys up Pine Creek with the aim of connecting with another railroad on the northern border of the state, possibly extending as far west as McKean County to do so. Sobieski Ross assumed the presidency of the company and began pushing grading from Jersey Shore towards Coudersport.

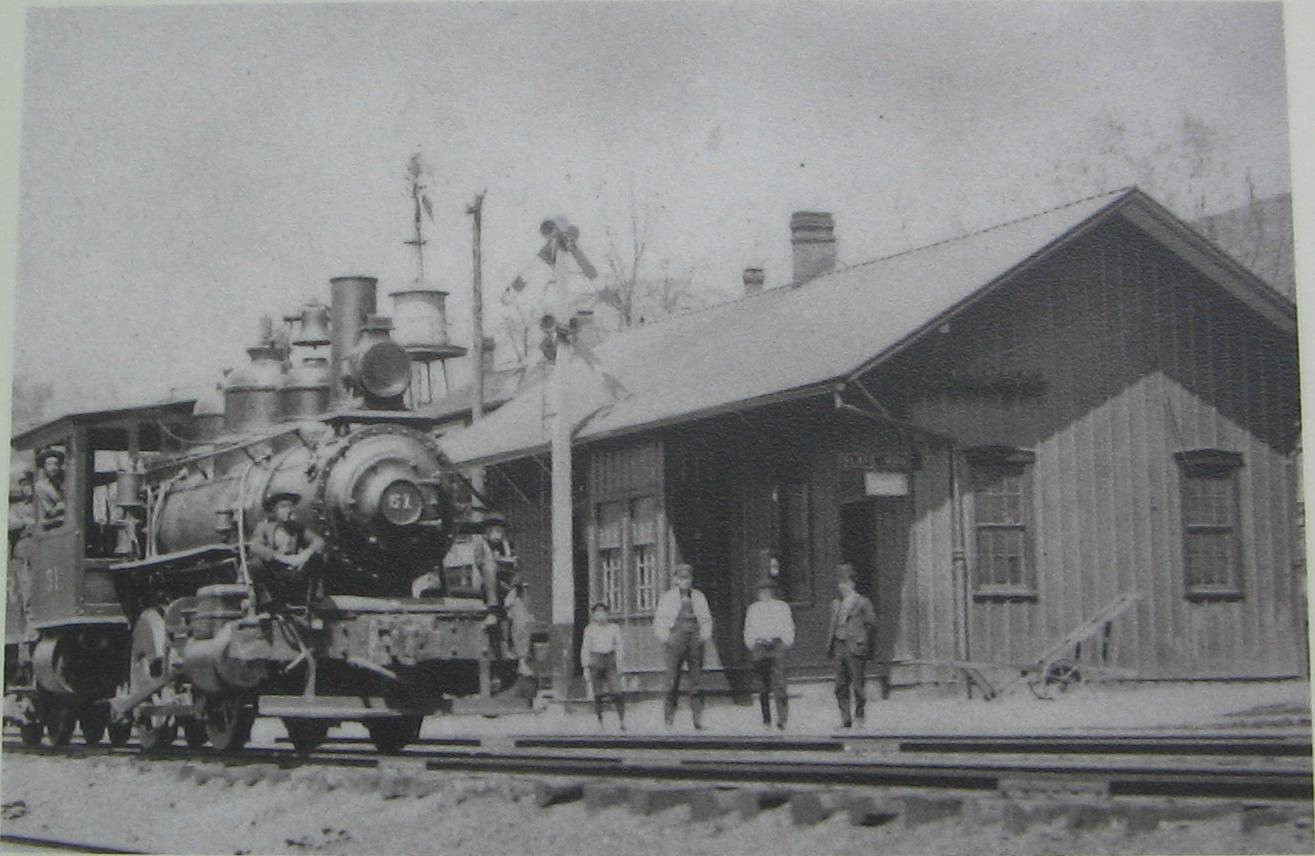
Locomotive and station of the Jersey Shore, Pine Creek and Buffalo Railway

On December 1, 1871, President Ross wrote to George B. McClellan, extolling the advantages of the route. McClellan was then president of the Atlantic and Great Western Railroad, which shipped petroleum to New York City over the Erie Railway. The Erie's service was felt to be unsatisfactory, and the A&GW potentially interested in a new partner. The eastern end of the A&GW was at Salamanca, New York, about 35 miles (56 km) from Port Allegany along the Allegheny River, and could easily be extended along the river to connect with the JSPC&B. At Newberry, near Williamsport, traffic could be routed onto the Catawissa Railroad and then the Central Railroad of New Jersey to reach the New York area.

Ross's letter gives a good idea of the route planned. He says that it would descend on the western side via Mill Creek, which meets the Allegheny River at Coudersport. The closest approach to the Pine Creek watershed would leave Mill Creek to climb along Nelson Run. A summit tunnel 2,300 feet (700 m) long was planned, which would suffice to carry a line from the headwaters of Nelson Run into Splash Dam Hollow, then down Lyman Run to the West Branch Pine Creek, reaching the main stream of Pine Creek at Galeton.

Besides the JSPC&B's value as a trunk line, Ross hopefully anticipated the development of traffic along the line from lumbering, coal mining, and iron manufacturing. In the end, only lumbering and tanning would play a significant role in the industry of the area. The coal beds along the Allegheny River west of Coudersport were proclaimed "worthless" by the State Geological Survey in 1885, nor could the local iron ore deposits be economically worked.

Another proposed railroad, the Rochester, Hornellsville, and Pine Creek Railroad, was chartered in 1872 and would have built south from Hornellsville, New York to the state line as part of a route from Hornellsville to Williamsport, which would have used the tracks of the JSPC&SL or JSPC&B for the portion in Pennsylvania. As originally contemplated, the Pennsylvania portion of the route would have run directly down the Pine Creek valley, but by the beginning of 1873, the RH&PC had decided that such a route would be uneconomical and had decided on a less direct route, reaching Pine Creek via the Wellsboro and Lawrenceville Railroad and an extension southwest from Antrim, Pennsylvania.

While grading of the JSPC&B began on June 12, 1873, the Panic of 1873 soon brought a halt to construction. The Gaines and State Line Railroad was chartered in 1875 with the intention of building north from the JSPC&B at Gaines to the state line to provide the link to the RH&PC. This line would have carried all the way to Geneva, New York, but was never completed. Sobieski Ross died in 1877, and was succeeded as president by John S. Ross.

== The New York Central and coal ==
During the early 1880s, the New York Central Railroad (NYC) and a consortium of coal companies from Tioga County, Pennsylvania and New York State embarked upon a bold venture. The coal companies were plagued by labor disputes, and the deposits they mined were diminishing. The NYC feared that its rival, the Pennsylvania Railroad, would use its control over coal shipments from central Pennsylvania to inflate the price of that fuel. The solution decided upon was that the coal companies, backed by the NYC, would build a new rail line into the Clearfield Coalfield and open new mines there. Coal would move north over the new line to the NYC. The JSPC&B would be a key link in the new extension. It would also link the NYC to its ally, the Philadelphia and Reading Railroad, via the latter's Catawissa Railroad subsidiary at Newberry.

George Magee, of the Fall Brook Coal Company, took control of the JSPC&B in 1881. He took advantage of a provision of the railroad's charter allowing for branches of up to thirty miles in any county traversed by the main line to build a new connection from the Fall Brook's Corning, Cowanesque & Antrim Railroad at Stokesdale Junction, near Wellsboro, and follow Marsh Creek to Pine Creek and the original JSPC&B route at Ansonia, and then pass downstream to Jersey Shore and the Reading connection at Newberry.

Magee and the NYC were not particularly interested in the remainder of the route to the west of Ansonia. He sold the roadbed from Coudersport to Port Allegany to a local group, which incorporated in 1882 as the Coudersport and Port Allegany Railroad and opened a line on the old grade between the two towns in its name in 1882. The JSPC&B continued construction on the route from Newberry to Stokesdale Junction, which ran through the spectacular Pine Creek Gorge (also known as the Grand Canyon of Pennsylvania) below Ansonia. The new line began regular service on June 4, 1883 and was opened over its whole length on July 1, 1883. The new line was not directly operated by the New York Central; rather, on December 18, 1882, it was leased to the Fall Brook Coal Company from the date of completion (officially June 30, 1883) for twenty years. The company's name was changed to the Pine Creek Railway on February 6, 1884.

Most of the rest of the planned route between Ansonia and Coudersport saw track laid by the Buffalo and Susquehanna Railroad and dependent logging lines; however, it was not connected so as to form a through route, and the summit tunnel was never built.

== Pine Creek Railway ==
Pine Creek Railway
Overview
- Locale: Tioga County, Pennsylvania
- Dates of operation: 1884–1909
- Successor: Geneva, Corning and Southern Railroad

Technical
- Track gauge: 4 ft 8 1/2 in (1,435 mm) standard gauge

As the Pine Creek Railway, the new line formed an important part of the Fall Brook's system. The Fall Brook already leased the Corning, Cowanesque & Antrim and a series of NYC-controlled lines in New York, giving it a continuous line from Tioga County to the NYC main line at Lyons, New York. On July 1, 1892, the Fall Brook Coal Company separated its railroad and coal interests, transferring the Pine Creek Ry. lease to the new Fall Brook Railway. However, the independent operation of these lines by the Fall Brook was not to last. In 1895, the NYC began to investigate buying out the Fall Brook, which now formed a vital link between the New York Central main line and the NYC-controlled Beech Creek Railroad at Jersey Shore. The NYC ultimately succeeded in buying up the Fall Brook Railway, and took over the Pine Creek Railway lease on May 1, 1899.

On February 4, 1909, the Pine Creek was merged with other elements of the former Fall Brook system to form the Geneva, Corning and Southern Railroad, which in turn was merged into the New York Central on December 22, 1914.

After the 1899 takeover, the former Fall Brook lines were operated by the NYC as the Fall Brook District, Pennsylvania Division. The Pine Creek line was one of those taken over by Conrail in 1976, but the last train ran on the route on October 7, 1988. After the removal of the tracks, the right-of-way was converted to the Pine Creek Rail Trail.

== Gallery ==
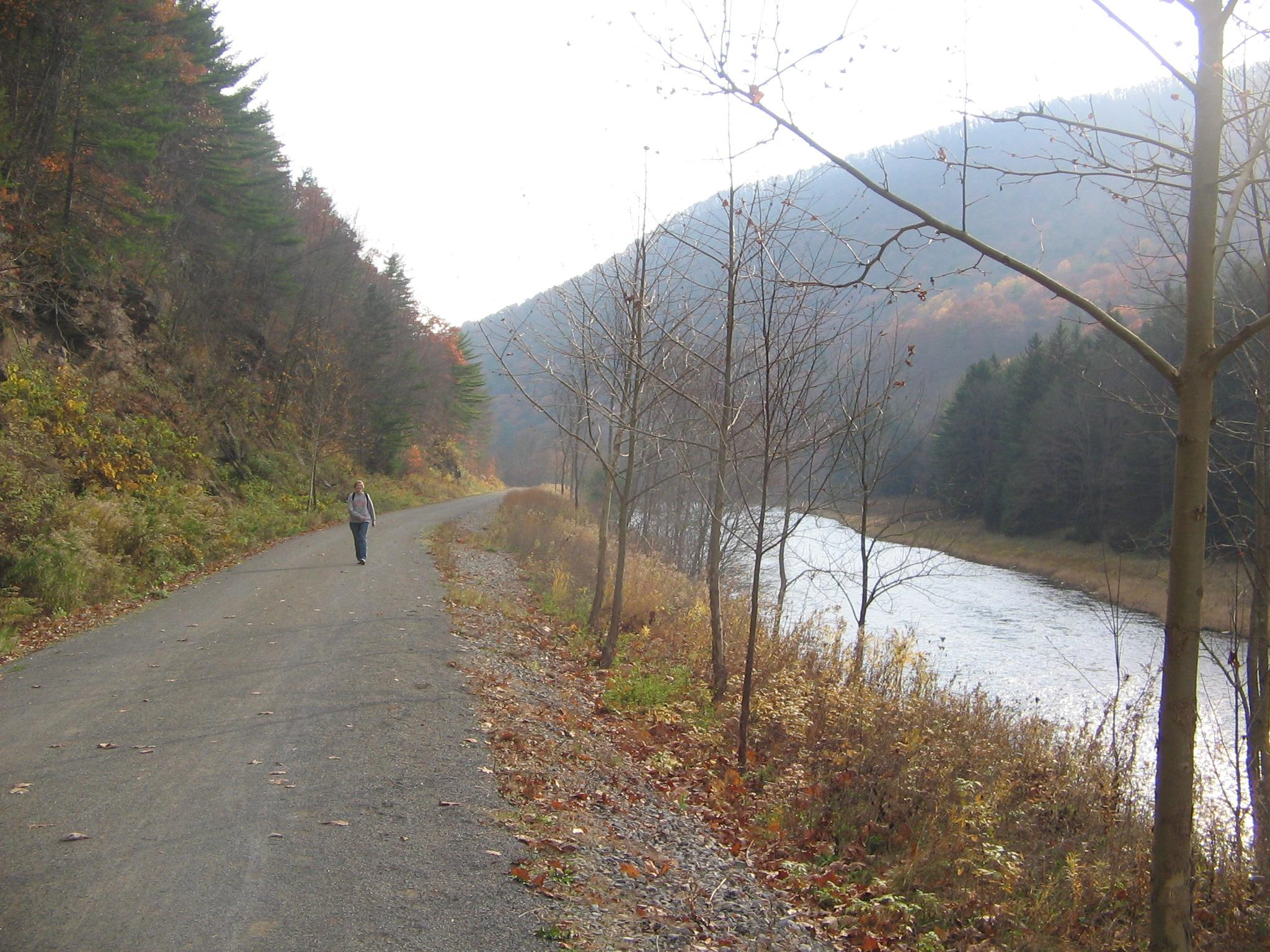
Former JSPC&B right-of-way along Pine Creek
