= Pittsburg and Shawmut Railroad =

Railway line

Overview
- Headquarters: Kittanning, Pennsylvania
- Reporting mark: PSR
- Locale: Brockway, Pennsylvania to Freeport, Pennsylvania
- Successor: Buffalo and Pittsburgh Railroad

Technical
- Track gauge: 4 ft 8 1/2 in (1,435 mm) standard gauge

The Pittsburg and Shawmut Railroad (reporting mark PSR), also known as the Shawmut Line, was a short line railroad company operating passenger and freight service on standard gauge track in central and southwestern Pennsylvania. Since 2004, it has been operated as part of the Buffalo and Pittsburgh Railroad, which is owned by Genesee & Wyoming Inc.

== History ==
The Pittsburg and Shawmut Railroad is often confused with the similarly named Pittsburg, Shawmut and Northern Railroad from which the P&S had its origins. Further adding to the confusion is the fact that both were nicknamed the Shawmut Line, both operated in roughly the same geographic area, and both used similar diamond logos during their history. In fact the two were separate and unrelated companies after their 1916 split.

The P&S operated on a single-track main line, with approximately 88 miles (140 km) of standard gauge track extending from Brockway, Pennsylvania to Freeport, Pennsylvania. The railroad operated using timetable and train orders without block systems until at least 1950. The main shops were located in Brookville, Pennsylvania.

=== Beginnings ===
The Pittsburg and Shawmut Railroad Company began life on July 21, 1903, as the Brookville and Mahoning Railroad, leased by the Pittsburg, Shawmut and Northern Railroad. When the PS&N declared bankruptcy in 1905, the B&M was spun off into a separate entity and was renamed in 1909 due to confusion with the Boston and Maine Railroad's initials. Coal was the principal commodity for the line for its entire existence. Doodlebugs and passenger trains ran on the route in the early years but had all been eliminated by 1939.

=== Recent history ===
By 1986, the Pittsburg & Shawmut had interchanges with Conrail at Brookville and Freeport, and with the Chessie System at Dellwood and West Mongrove.

The company acquired a ten-mile (16 km) section of Conrail track running from Sligo to Lawsonham in 1989 and reorganized it as the Red Bank Railroad. On December 31, 1991, the company purchased about 110 miles (180 km) of the Low Grade Secondary track from Lawsonham to Driftwood, Pennsylvania from Conrail and organized it as the Mountain Laurel Railroad.

The company began using the red Shawmut Line logo in the 1970s. It was identical to the old PS&N RR logo in everything but color.

=== Spelling of Pittsburg ===
The spelling of Pittsburgh as Pittsburg derives from the company's origins in the Pittsburg, Shawmut & Northern Railroad. That company was chartered in 1899 when the name of Pittsburgh, Pennsylvania was commonly spelled without the h. The United States Board on Geographic Names advocated the h-less spelling from 1891 to 1911 in an effort to standardize the spelling of place names in the United States.

== Management ==
Logo used after the takeover by G&W

The Arthur T. Walker Estate Corporation had direct control of the company until 1996, when the railroad was acquired by the Genesee & Wyoming. The Genesee & Wyoming operated the Pittsburg & Shawmut Railroad under its own banner until January 1, 2004, when it was absorbed into the Buffalo and Pittsburgh Railroad, another G&W company. Simultaneously, a new company with the same name was created to purchase the property, which is now operated by the BPRR. (The P&S also acquired the residual common carrier obligation on the lines.) Today, most of the railroad is gone. The B&P ran the last train between Brookville, PA and Reesedale, PA in January 2000, and removed the tracks between 2005 and 2006. The main line between Brookville and Brockway was removed in 2003.

== Locomotive roster ==
The Pittsburg & Shawmut operated with steam power until the entire steam roster was scrapped in favor of dieselization in late 1953. After 1953, motive power consisted of a fleet of EMD SW9 switcher locomotives and, later, EMD GP7s.

In the 1970s, the Pittsburg & Shawmut modified several aspects of the fleet to celebrate the United States Bicentennial: the warm yellow and red color scheme was replaced by red, white, and blue to resemble the nation's flag; locomotives were renumbered in honor of significant years in American history; and the locomotives were nicknamed after American historical figures and arms manufacturers.

Pittsburg & Shawmut Locomotive Roster
Last Engine No./Old Engine No.'s (Name)	Year built	Builder	Type	Wheel arrangement	Notes	Image
PS 104	1920	American Locomotive Company	E-1-S Class Atlantic	4-4-2	Scrapped November 1938	
PS 105	1920	American Locomotive Company	E-1-S Class Atlantic	4-4-2	Scrapped November 1938	
PS 200	1911	Baldwin Locomotive Works	J-Class Mikado	2-8-2	Scrapped, locomotive bell preserved and on display at the Jefferson County History Center.	
PS 201	1911	Baldwin Locomotive Works	J-Class Mikado	2-8-2	Scrapped November 1938	
PS 202	1913	Baldwin Locomotive Works	J-Class Mikado	2-8-2		
PS 203	1913	Baldwin Locomotive Works	J-Class Mikado	2-8-2		
PS 204	1913	Baldwin Locomotive Works	J-Class Mikado	2-8-2		
PS 205	1913	Baldwin Locomotive Works	J-Class Mikado	2-8-2	Scrapped November 1938	
PS 206	1913	Baldwin Locomotive Works	J-Class Mikado	2-8-2		
PS 207	1913	Baldwin Locomotive Works	J-Class Mikado	2-8-2		
PS 208	1913	Baldwin Locomotive Works	J-Class Mikado	2-8-2		
PS 209	1913	Baldwin Locomotive Works	J-Class Mikado	2-8-2		
PS 210	1913	Baldwin Locomotive Works	J-Class Mikado	2-8-2		
PS 211	1913	Baldwin Locomotive Works	J-Class Mikado	2-8-2	Scrapped November 1938	
PS 212	1914	Baldwin Locomotive Works	J1-Class Mikado	2-8-2		
PS 213	1914	Baldwin Locomotive Works	J1-Class Mikado	2-8-2		
PS 214	1914	Baldwin Locomotive Works	J1-Class Mikado	2-8-2		
PS 215	1914	Baldwin Locomotive Works	J1-Class Mikado	2-8-2		
PS 216	1914	Baldwin Locomotive Works	J1-Class Mikado	2-8-2		
PS 217	1914	Baldwin Locomotive Works	J1-Class Mikado	2-8-2		
PS 226	1911	Baldwin Locomotive Works	H-Class Consolidation	2-8-0		
PS 227	1911	Baldwin Locomotive Works	H-Class Consolidation	2-8-0	Scrapped November 1942	
PS 228	1911	Baldwin Locomotive Works	H-Class Consolidation	2-8-0	Scrapped December 1940	
PS 229	1911	Baldwin Locomotive Works	H-Class Consolidation	2-8-0	Scrapped November 1938	
PS 570/MON 570	1929	American Locomotive Company	J4 Class Mikado	2-8-2	Acquired from the Monon Railroad in 1947. Scrapped in 1953.	
PS 571/MON 571	1929	American Locomotive Company	J4 Class Mikado	2-8-2	Acquired from the Monon Railroad in 1949. Scrapped in 1953.	
PS 572/MON 572	1929	American Locomotive Company	J4 Class Mikado	2-8-2	Acquired from the Monon Railroad in 1949. Scrapped in 1953.	
PS 573/MON 573	1929	American Locomotive Company	J4 Class Mikado	2-8-2	Acquired from the Monon Railroad in 1947. Scrapped in 1953.	
PS 574/MON 574	1929	American Locomotive Company	J4 Class Mikado	2-8-2	Acquired from the Monon Railroad in 1947. Scrapped in 1953.	
PS 575/MON 575	1929	American Locomotive Company	J4 Class Mikado	2-8-2	Acquired from the Monon Railroad in 1947. Involved in a 1950 collision with a motor-truck in Timblin, PA, killing one employee and injuring one employee. Scrapped in 1953.	
PS 577/MON 577	1929	American Locomotive Company	J4 Class Mikado	2-8-2	Acquired from the Monon Railroad in 1947. Scrapped in 1953.	
PS 579/MON 579	1929	American Locomotive Company	J4 Class Mikado	2-8-2	Acquired from the Monon Railroad in 1949. Scrapped in 1953.	
PS 1775/PS 231 (Independence)	1953	EMD	SW9	B-B	Sold to the Lycoming Valley Railroad	Former P&S 1775 on the Lycoming Valley Railroad, 2006.
PS 1866/PS 232 (Oliver Winchester)	1953	EMD	SW9	B-B	As of April 28th, 2025, PS #1866 serves as AERC #1866 on the Albany & Eastern Railroad in Oregon.	
PS 1774/PS 233 (Ben Franklin)	1953	EMD	SW9	B-B	As of June 11, 2023, PS #1774 serves as PSCC #16 on the Pennsylvania & Southern Railroad in Chambersburg, PA.	
PS 1891/PS 234 (John Browning)	1953	EMD	SW9	B-B		
PS 1851/PS 235 (Sam Colt)	1953	EMD	SW9	B-B		
PS 1865/PS 236 (B. Tyler Henry)	1953	EMD	SW9	B-B	As of May 24th, 2025, PS #1865 serves as JVRR #2106 for the Juniata Valley Railroad in central Pennsylvania.	
PS 1949/PS 237 (Bill Ruger)	1953	EMD	SW9	B-B		
PS 1816/PS 238 (Eliphalet Remington)	1953	EMD	SW9	B-B	Sold to the Lycoming Valley Railroad	
PS 1776/PS 239 (Betsy Ross)	1953	EMD	SW9	B-B	Sold to the Lycoming Valley Railroad	
PS 357/RDG 608 (Dan Wesson)	1953	EMD	GP7	B-B	Rather than a year, this locomotive's number is a reference to the .357 Magnum, invented by Dan B. Wesson. Locomotive purchased from the Reading Railroad in 1975, set aside in 1981, and scrapped in March 1986.	
PS 10/CR 5672/PC 5672/NYC 5817	1953	EMD	GP7	B-B	Purchased from Conrail in 1981. First in service for the P&S in 1982.	
PS 11/CR 5818/PC 5818/NYC 5818/C&O 5720	1951	GMD	GP7	B-B	Purchased from Conrail in 1981. First in service for the P&S in 1985.	
