= Cowanesque River =

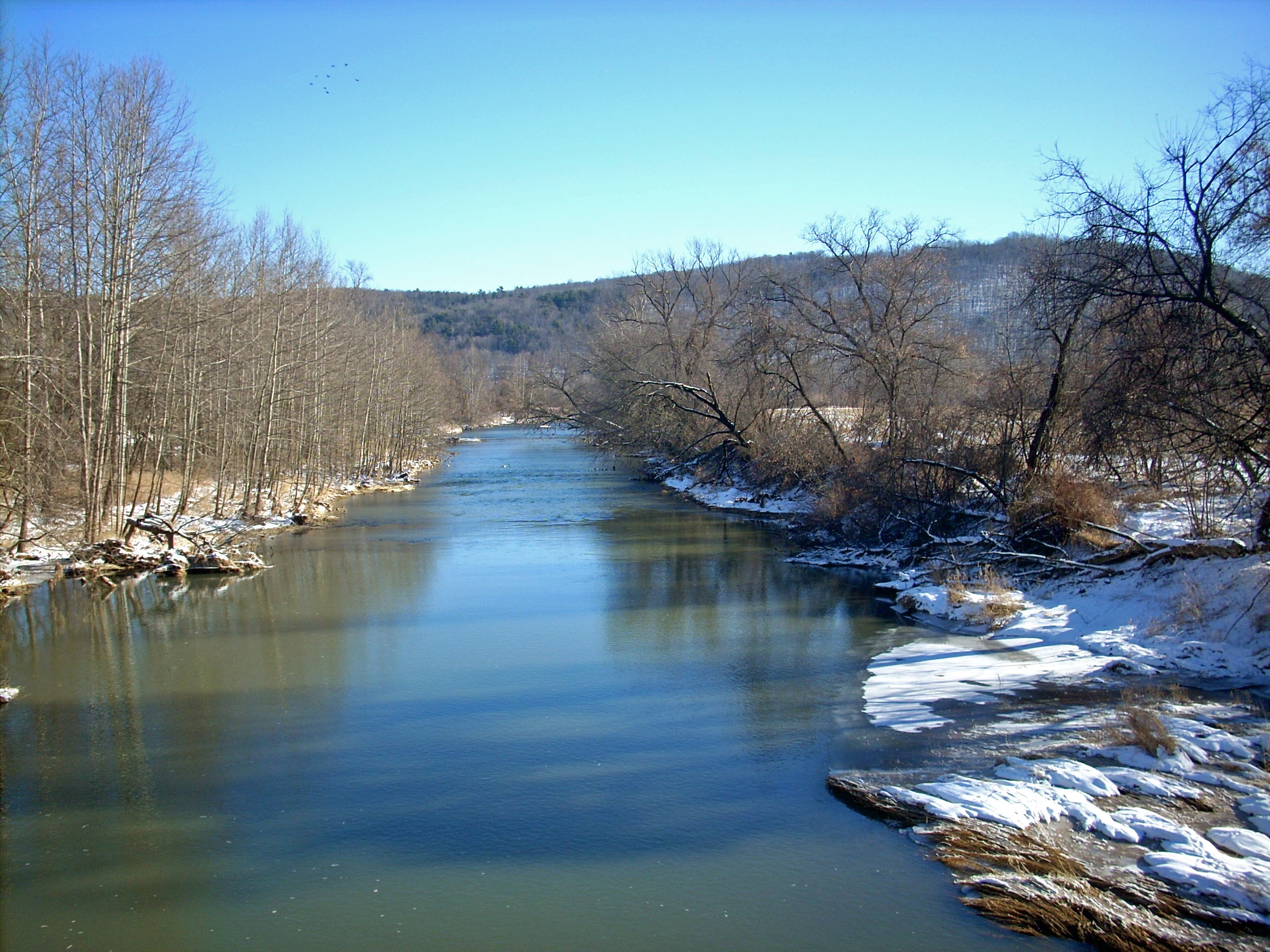
- Cowanesque River near the Pennsylvania/New York border

- Location of the mouth of the Cowanesque River in New York State.

Location
- Country: United States
- State: Pennsylvania, New York

Physical characteristics
- Source
  - location: Near Ulysses, Potter County, Pennsylvania
  - coordinates: 41°55′33″N 77°43′43″W
- Mouth: Tioga River
  - location: Near Lawrenceville, Pennsylvania, Steuben County, New York
  - coordinates: 42°00′05″N 77°06′58″W
- Length: 41.4 mi (66.6 km)

The Cowanesque River is a 41.4-mile-long (66.6 km) tributary of the Tioga River in Potter and Tioga counties, Pennsylvania, and Steuben County, New York, in the United States. It joins the Tioga River soon after crossing from Pennsylvania into New York, near the borough of Lawrenceville, Pennsylvania.

The name of the Cowanesque River is of Native American origin, derived either from Go-wan-is-que ("briary or thorn bushy"), or from Ka-hwe-nes-ka ("on the long island").

In Tioga County, the Cowanesque Dam was constructed by the US Army Corps of Engineers in 1980. The dam created Cowanesque Lake, which helps prevent flooding within the valley. The 1,085-acre (4.39 km^{2}) lake also facilitates various forms of recreation; the Tompkins Recreation Area and Campground is located along the lake's north shore, and the south shore hosts two day-use areas.

== See also ==
- List of rivers of New York
- List of rivers of Pennsylvania
