= Lycoming Valley Railroad =

Pennsylvania railroad

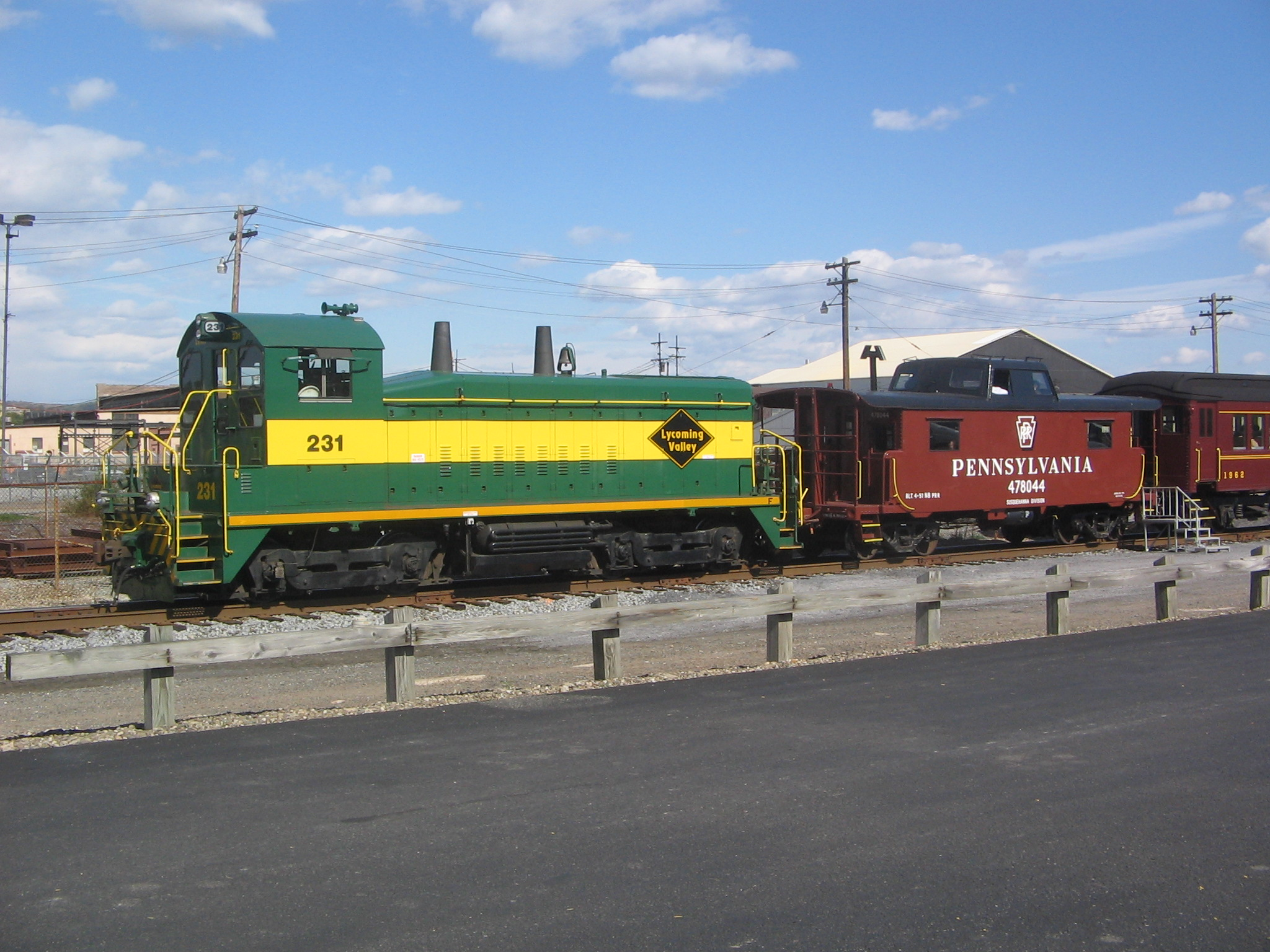
- Lycoming Valley Railroad diesel engine #231 pushing a restored PRR caboose on a fall foliage tourist excursion

Overview
- Headquarters: Northumberland, Pennsylvania
- Reporting mark: LVRR
- Locale: Pennsylvania
- Dates of operation: 1996–present

Technical
- Track gauge: 4 ft 8 1/2 in (1,435 mm) standard gauge
- Length: 38 miles (61 km)

Other
- Website: www.nshr.com/lvrr

The Lycoming Valley Railroad (reporting mark LVRR) is a short line that operates 38 miles (61 km) of track in Lycoming and Clinton counties in Pennsylvania in the United States. It is part of the North Shore Railroad System.

The line runs generally west between Muncy (in Lycoming County) and Avis (in Clinton County). Other communities served include Montoursville, Williamsport (and its western neighborhood of Newberry), the unincorporated village of Linden (in Woodward Township) and Jersey Shore (all in Lycoming County). 37 miles (60 km) of track are in Lycoming County and 1-mile (1.6 km) is in Clinton County.

The rail line runs north and then west along the left bank of the West Branch Susquehanna River, roughly following the routes of Interstate 180 and U.S. Route 220.

The corporate offices are located in Northumberland, Pennsylvania. There are connections to the Norfolk Southern Railway line at Muncy and Linden (as well as an indirect connection to Canadian Pacific Railway service).

The Lycoming County Visitors Bureau offers occasional train excursions, departing from Williamsport and going to either Jersey Shore or Muncy and returning. In the fall these are billed as "Fall Foliage Excursions" and in December there are Polar Express rides with Santa Claus.

The system has trackage rights via the Norfolk Southern line. These allow the Lycoming Valley Railroad to connect to the west with the Nittany and Bald Eagle Railroad (at Lock Haven) and, to the south, with the Union County Industrial Railroad (at Milton), the North Shore Railroad (at Northumberland), and Shamokin Valley Railroad (at Sunbury).

== History ==
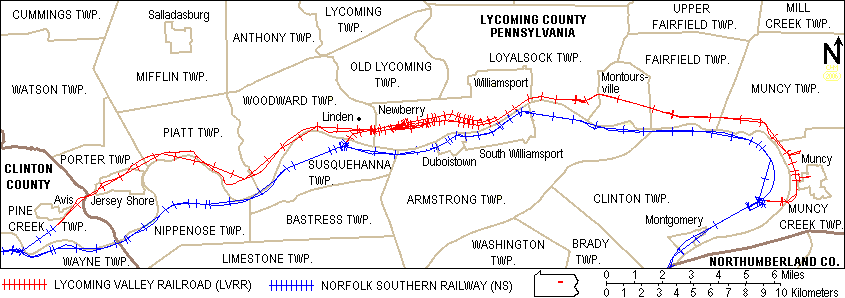
Map of the Lycoming Valley Railroad (red) and Norfolk Southern Railway (blue) lines in Lycoming County.

The line operated by the Lycoming Valley Railroad (Initials are LVRR) was formerly part of the Reading Company and New York Central Railroad and was absorbed into Conrail. SEDA-COG JRA was formed in July 1983 to continue to provide rail service to communities whose rail lines Conrail had decided to abandon. In 1996 the JRA took over the line when Conrail abandoned it, and the Lycoming Valley Railroad was born as its fifth railroad.

Vast stands of timber and nearby coal deposits brought three early railroads to the Williamsport area. In December 1854, the Sunbury & Erie RR, a PRR predecessor, built northward through Williamport. The Catawissa, Williamsport & Erie RR, a Reading predecessor, ran its trains to Williamsport over Sunbury & Erie from 1854 until its own line was constructed 1871. The New York Central presence in the Valley dates from 1883, when its Pine Creek RR opened between Wellsboro and Newberry, to haul coal. All these routes were merged into Conrail in 1976. Purchased by the SEDA-CoG Joint Rail Authority, they have been operated by the Lycoming Valley Railroad Company since August 15, 1996.

On September 8, 2011, the railroad bridge over Loyalsock Creek was heavily damaged by flooding. Heavy rain from the remnants of Tropical Storm Lee raised the creek "higher than anything we've seen in recorded history", according to a Lycoming County official. According to USGS gauge height recordings upstream at Loyalsockville, the creek crested that day at 70,000 cubic feet per second or 31.5 million gallons per minute. The damage to the bridge was severe enough that the bridge was not able to be saved. While she still stood, one of the middle piers had become dislodged and the rails were bent. The bridge over the Loyalsock Creek was rebuilt and opened in 2014.

== See also ==
- List of Pennsylvania railroads
- Stourbridge Railroad (also operated by Robey Railroads)
