= North Shore Railroad System =

U.S railroad system

The North Shore Railroad System in the United States includes the following short lines:

- Juniata Valley Railroad (JVRR)*
- Lycoming Valley Railroad (LVRR)*
- Nittany and Bald Eagle Railroad (NBER)*
- North Shore Railroad (NSHR)*
- Shamokin Valley Railroad (SVRR)*
- Union County Industrial Railroad (UCIR)

The first five railroads (those marked with an asterisk) are owned by SEDA-COG JRA (Susquehanna Economic Development Association - Council of Governments Joint Rail Authority) and operated under contract by Robey Railroads, a private company. Robey Railroads also operates another railroad (UCIR). As of 2006, there are plans by Robey to consolidate these seven lines as the Susquehanna Railroad Corporation, a non-operating holding company.

The current president and CEO is Gary Shields.

The corporate offices are located in Northumberland, Pennsylvania. There are connections to the Norfolk Southern Railway line at Lewistown, as well as an indirect connection to Canadian Pacific Railway service.
