= Juniata Valley Railroad =

Overview
- Headquarters: Northumberland, Pennsylvania
- Reporting mark: JVRR
- Locale: Pennsylvania
- Dates of operation: 1996–

Technical
- Track gauge: 4 ft 8 1/2 in (1,435 mm) standard gauge

The Juniata Valley Railroad (reporting mark JVRR) is a short line that operates 11 miles of track in Mifflin County, Pennsylvania in the United States. It is part of the North Shore Railroad System.

The communities served include Lewistown (and the MCIDC industrial park), the unincorporated village of Maitland in Derry Township, and Burnham. All the track meets at Lewistown, with lines to the industrial park to the southwest, Maitland to the northeast (roughly parallel to U.S. Route 522), and Burnham to the northwest (roughly parallel to U.S. Route 322).

The system has trackage rights via the Norfolk Southern Railway, interchanging with the Pittsburgh Line at Lewistown.

== History ==
The line operated by the Juniata Valley Railroad was a Penn Central Railroad line that was taken over by Conrail. SEDA-COG JRA (Susquehanna Economic Development Association - Council of Governments Joint Rail Authority) was formed in July, 1983 to continue to provide rail service to communities whose rail lines Conrail had decided to abandon. In 1996 the JRA took over the line when Conrail abandoned it, and the Juniata Valley Railroad was born as its fourth railroad.

== See also ==
- List of Pennsylvania railroads
- Stourbridge Railroad (also operated by Robey Railroads)
