= Lawrenceville, Pennsylvania =

Borough in Pennsylvania, United States

- Borough
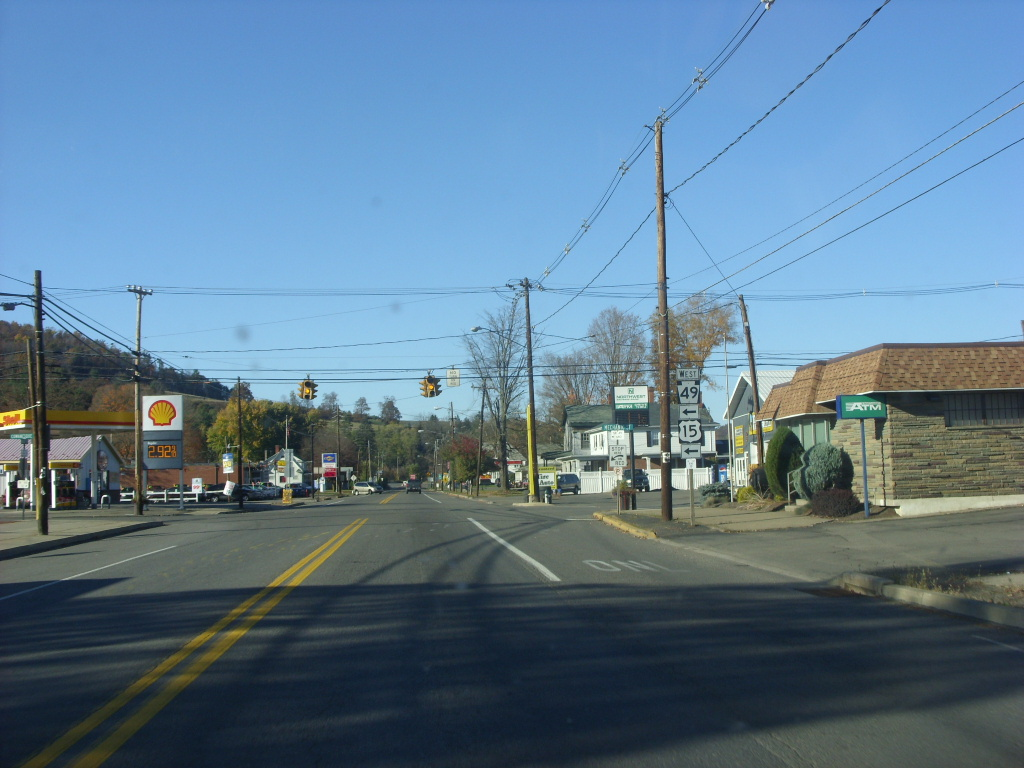
- Looking north on Main Street in Lawrenceville

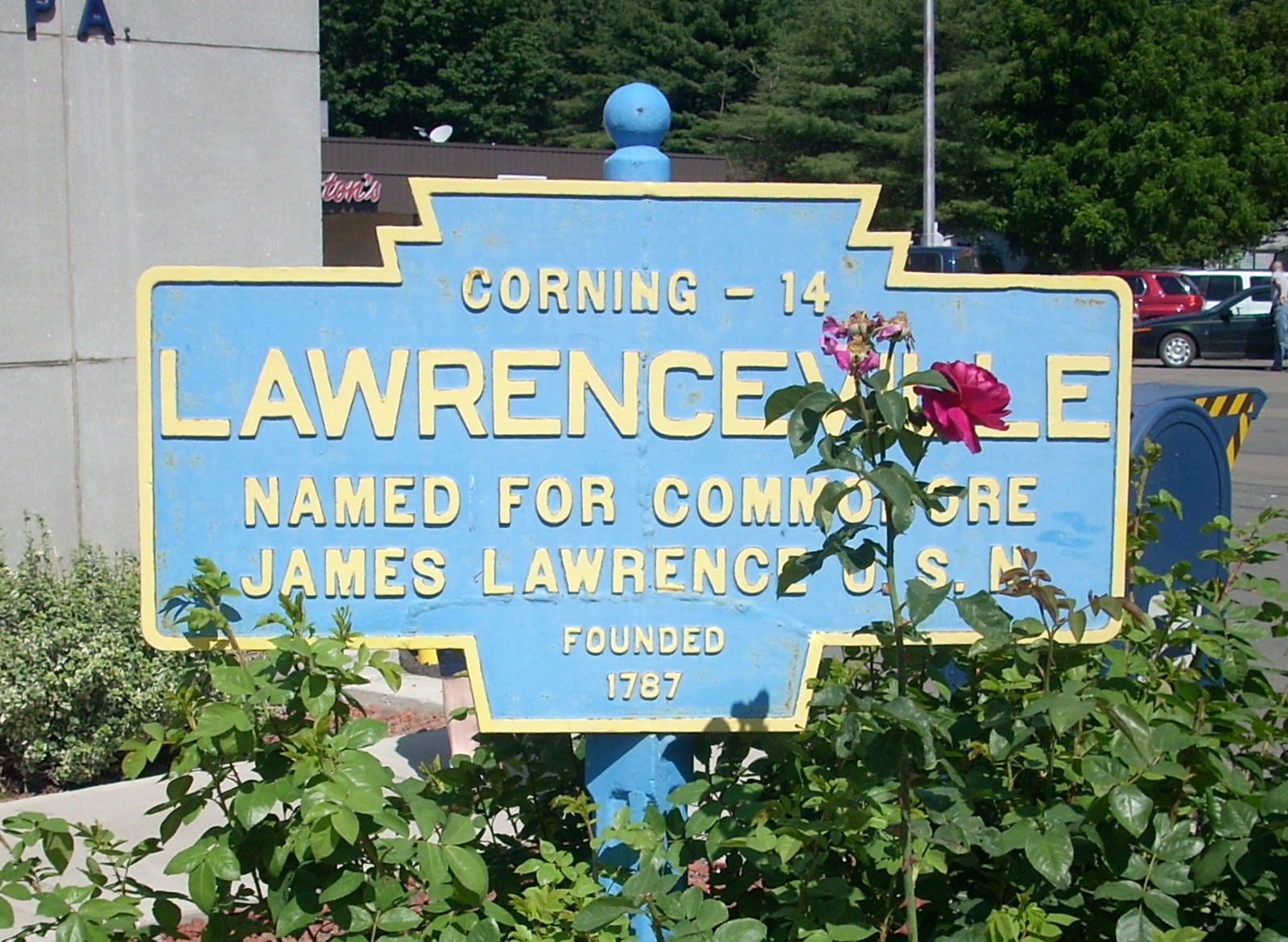
- Keystone Marker

- Location of Lawrenceville in Tioga County, Pennsylvania.

- Location within the U.S. state of Pennsylvania Lawrenceville (the United States)
- Coordinates: 41°59′45″N 77°07′45″W
- Country: United States
- State: Pennsylvania
- County: Tioga
- Settled: 1793
- Incorporated (borough): 1831

Area
  - Total: 0.61 sq mi (1.59 km^{2})
  - Land: 0.61 sq mi (1.59 km^{2})
  - Water: 0 sq mi (0.00 km^{2})
- Elevation: 997 ft (304 m)

Population (2020)
  - Total: 691
  - Density: 1,124.4/sq mi (434.13/km^{2})
- Time zone: Eastern (EST)
  - Summer (DST): EDT
- ZIP Code: 16929
- Area code: 570
- FIPS code: 42-42016
- Website: https://lawrencevillepa.com/

Lawrenceville is a borough in Tioga County, Pennsylvania. The population was 690 at the 2020 census.

== Geography ==
Lawrenceville is located at 41°59′48″N 77°7′31″W (41.996564, -77.125159). It is at the intersection of Pennsylvania Route 287 and Pennsylvania Route 49. The only traffic light in town can be found at this intersection. Lawrenceville is on the banks of the Tioga and Cowanesque rivers. The confluence of these streams is just outside downtown Lawrenceville. Cowanesque Lake, a US Army Corps of Engineers flood prevention lake is just to the west of town on Pennsylvania Route 49.

According to the U.S. Census Bureau, the borough has a total area of 0.6 square miles (1.6 km^{2}), all land. The community is at the New York state line, and part of its development continues into the town of Lindley in Steuben County, New York.

== Demographics ==
Historical population
Census	Pop.	Note	%±
1850	494		—
1860	512		3.6%
1870	478		−6.6%
1880	426		−10.9%
1890	441		3.5%
1900	486		10.2%
1910	549		13.0%
1920	508		−7.5%
1930	457		−10.0%
1940	450		−1.5%
1950	479		6.4%
1960	548		14.4%
1970	605		10.4%
1980	327		−46.0%
1990	481		47.1%
2000	627		30.4%
2010	581		−7.3%
2020	691		18.9%
2021 (est.)	689	▼	−0.3%

As of the census of 2000, there were 627 people, 262 households, and 175 families residing in the borough. The population density was 1,143.2 inhabitants per square mile (441.4/km^{2}). There were 280 housing units at an average density of 510.5 per square mile (197.1/km^{2}). The racial makeup of the borough was 99.20% White, 0.32% African American, 0.16% Native American and 0.32% Asian. Hispanic or Latino of any race were 0.48% of the population.

There were 262 households, out of which 30.9% had children under the age of 18 living with them, 46.9% were married couples living together, 13.4% had a female householder with no husband present, and 33.2% were non-families. Of all households 27.9% were made up of individuals, and 13.7% had someone living alone who was 65 years of age or older. The average household size was 2.34 and the average family size was 2.81.

In the borough the population was spread out, with 24.6% under the age of 18, 9.7% from 18 to 24, 27.0% from 25 to 44, 19.6% from 45 to 64, and 19.1% who were 65 years of age or older. The median age was 37 years. For every 100 females there were 95.3 males. For every 100 females age 18 and over, there were 89.2 males.

The median income for a household in the borough was $29,896, and the median income for a family was $36,250. Males had a median income of $32,171 versus $25,833 for females. The per capita income for the borough was $16,127. About 14.5% of families and 15.7% of the population were below the poverty line, including 27.0% of those under age 18 and 3.3% of those age 65 or over.

== Education ==
It is in the Northern Tioga School District.
