= Pittsburg, Shawmut and Northern Railroad =

Former railroad company

Overview
- Headquarters: Angelica, New York
- Reporting mark: PSN
- Locale: Brockway, Pennsylvania to Wayland, New York
- Dates of operation: 1899–1947

Technical
- Track gauge: 4 ft 8 1/2 in (1,435 mm) standard gauge

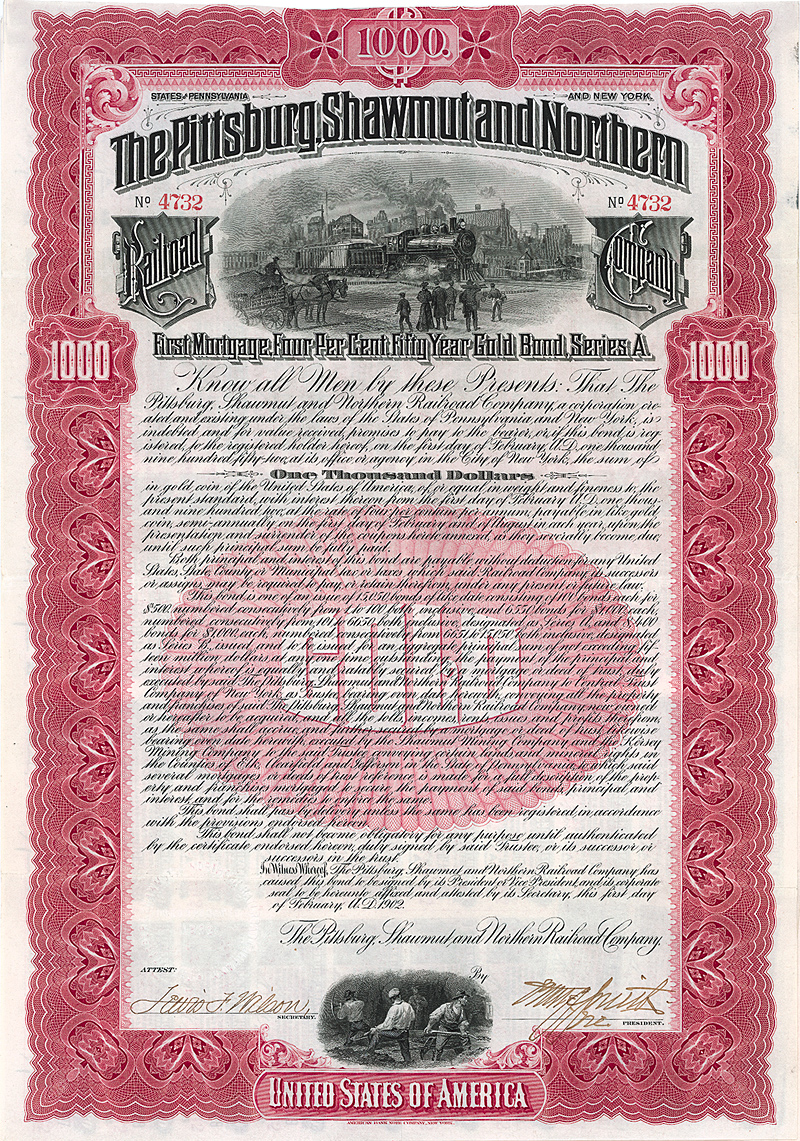
Bond of the Pittsburg, Shawmut and Northern Railroad Company from the 1st February 1902

The Pittsburg, Shawmut & Northern Railroad (reporting mark PSN) also known as the Shawmut Line, was a Class I railroad company operating passenger and freight service on standard gauge track in central Pennsylvania and western New York. The line was financially troubled for its entire life span and declared bankruptcy after just six years of operation. It would spend the remaining 42 year of its existence in receivership or trusteeship: one of the longest bankruptcy proceedings in American railroading history.

The Pittsburg, Shawmut & Northern Railroad is often confused with the similarly named Pittsburg and Shawmut Railroad which was a spinoff company from the PS&N. Further adding to the confusion is the fact that both were nicknamed the Shawmut Line, both operated in roughly the same geographic area, and both used nearly identical logos during their history. In fact, the two were completely separate companies after their 1916 split.

The main line consisted of approximately 190 miles (306 km) of track extending from Brockway, Pennsylvania to Wayland, New York with several branches, particularly Olean, New York to Prosser, New York (a location on the southeastern edge of South Valley, New York) and Moraine, New York (a location on the eastern edge of Canaseraga, New York) to Hornell, New York. Principal shops were divided between Angelica, New York (car shop, paint shop, maintenance of way) and St. Marys, Pennsylvania (motive power shop). Each shop burned and was rebuilt.

The Pittsburg, Shawmut & Northern Railroad began life on August 2, 1899, as the merger of five small railroads in New York and Pennsylvania. 60 miles (97 km) of what ultimately became the PS&N were originally 3 ft (914 mm) narrow gauge lines, though by the time of the PS&N's incorporation only 18 miles (29 km) remained as narrow gauge. At the time of its incorporation the PS&N operated four physically-disconnected divisions. The expense of connecting the divisions and upgrading the physical plant to handle through coal trains, coupled with the failure of the PS&N's principal bond underwriter, forced the company to declare bankruptcy in 1905. The company would continue to operate in receivership until 1946, when the bankruptcy was converted to a trusteeship.

The spelling of Pittsburgh as Pittsburg in the company name derives from the company’s original 1899 charter. At the time, the name of Pittsburgh, Pennsylvania was commonly spelled without the h. The United States Board on Geographic Names advocated the h-less spelling from 1891 to 1911 as part of an effort to standardize the spelling of place names in the United States.

The more lucrative Brockway to Freeport route was constructed beginning in 1903 as the Brookville & Mahoning. Confusion with the Boston & Maine caused the name to be changed to the Pittsburg & Shawmut Railroad. The P&S was leased (but never owned) by the PS&N from 1906 until 1916. After 1916, the lease was terminated and the two companies operated separately. During the time of the lease, the bigger "200 class" 2-8-2s of the P&S operated over the combined systems.

Coal (bituminous) was the principal commodity for the line during its entire existence, though passenger trains and, after the late 1920s, self-propelled gas-powered motor cars (known on the PS&N as "Hoodlebugs") also ran on the route until they were discontinued in 1935. In the early 1930s, the final years of service, the railroad's passenger service on its full mainline route was segmented. Train 9 southbound (10 northbound) traveled as a passenger train from Wayland, New York to Prosser, New York. At Prosser, passengers traveling the full route south would switch to a motor car in Train 11 southbound (12 northbound) which began its trip on a side branch from Olean. This motor car train would continue south to St. Marys, whereupon southbound travelers would transfer to Train 1, another motor car train, for the final trip to Brockway. This trip would involve an overnight layover in St. Marys between a 6:45 pm arrival and #1's 8:00 am departure. Travelers heading northbound would need to make an overnight stop at Prosser, as #12 from Brockway arrived in Prosser at 1:30 pm and #10 bound for Wayland would depart Prosser at 6:39 am.

PS&N operations ended effective April 1, 1947. Portions of the line serving Olean, Brandy Camp, and Farmers Valley were acquired by the Pennsylvania Railroad (the Farmers Valley portion is today owned by the Norfolk Southern Railway and operated by the Western New York and Pennsylvania Railroad). The Erie Railroad acquired the PS&N's Hornell Terminals in a complex transaction from the American National Red Cross, which had been given ownership of the Rochester, Hornellsville & Lackawanna Railroad, an 11-mile-long railroad leased to and operated by the PS&N and predecessors prior to 1946.

The tracks for most of the routes have been removed. The only remaining segments are West Creek Westlands Learning Center to St. Marys and Brockway Golf Course to Brockway.
