= Gaines, Pennsylvania =

Unincorporated community in Pennsylvania, US

- Unincorporated community
- Location within Pennsylvania
- Coordinates: 41°45′07″N 77°33′27″W
- Country: United States
- State: Pennsylvania
- County: Tioga
- Elevation: 1,293 ft (394 m)
- Time zone: UTC-5 (Eastern (EST))
  - Summer (DST): UTC-4 (EDT)
- ZIP code: 16921
- Area code: 814
- GNIS feature ID: 1175379

Gaines is an unincorporated community in Tioga County, Pennsylvania, United States. The community is located at the intersection of U.S. Route 6 and Pennsylvania Route 349, 4.6 miles (7.4 km) east-northeast of Galeton. Gaines has a post office with ZIP code 16921, which opened on August 8, 1849.
