= Union County Industrial Railroad =

Shortline railroad in Pennsylvania

Overview
- Headquarters: Northumberland, Pennsylvania
- Reporting mark: UCIR
- Locale: Pennsylvania
- Dates of operation: 1994–

Technical
- Track gauge: 4 ft 8 1/2 in (1,435 mm) standard gauge
- Length: 18.2 miles (29.3 km)

Other
- Website: http://www.nshr.com/UCIR.html

The Union County Industrial Railroad (reporting mark UCIR) is a shortline railroad that operates on approximately 12 miles (20 km) of track in Union County in the U.S. State of Pennsylvania. It is part of the North Shore Railroad System.

The line is along the right bank of the West Branch Susquehanna River, roughly following U.S. Route 15 between the unincorporated village of Winfield in southern Union County and the village of New Columbia (in White Deer Township) in northern Union County. Other communities served by the UCIR include Lewisburg, the village of West Milton (in Kelly Township), and Milton (east across the West Branch Susquehanna River in Northumberland County).

Although the UCIR has no employees and owns none of the track on which it operates, its corporate offices are located in Northumberland, Pennsylvania. There is a connection to the Norfolk Southern Railway line at Milton.

Robey Railroads, a private company, operates the Union County Industrial Railroad. The Union County Industrial Railroad has no employees, instead they are provided by the North Shore Railroad. This led the Railroad Retirement Board to find that "the Union County Industrial Railroad is not an employer subject to the Railroad Retirement and Railroad Unemployment Insurance Acts."

The North Shore Railroad System has trackage rights via the Norfolk Southern line. These allow the Union County Industrial Railroad to connect to the north and west with the Lycoming Valley Railroad (at Muncy and Linden), the Nittany and Bald Eagle Railroad (at Lock Haven) and, to the south, with the North Shore Railroad (at Northumberland) and the Shamokin Valley Railroad (at Sunbury).

== Union County rail lines ==
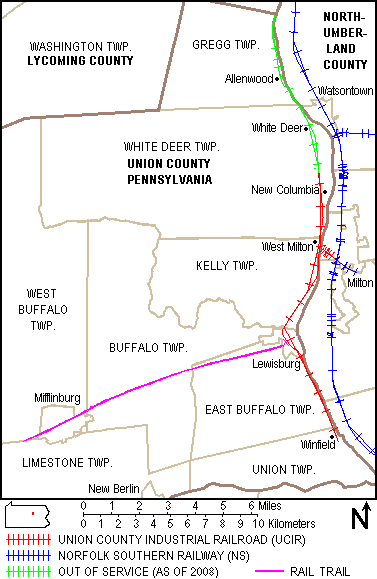
Map of the Union County Industrial Railroad (red), Norfolk Southern Railway (blue), and out of service (green) lines in Union County. Rail trail is purple.

There are basically two rail lines in Union County (although they have five different owners as of 2006):

1. the former "Reading Williamsport Line" from Winfield to Allenwood (north-south along the river);
2. the former "Reading Catawissa Branch" from West Milton east to Milton (east-west crossing the river);

All of the lines in Union County passed into the possession of Conrail, and were eventually abandoned or sold by it or its successors. Although the UCIR has a contract to operate on these lines between Winfield and Allenwood, and West Milton and Milton, as of 2008, the line from New Columbia north to Allenwood is out of service on account of bad track.

The UCIR formerly operated the West Shore Railroad (reporting mark WTSE) from Lewisburg to Mifflinburg, but service ended in 1997 and the 11.8 miles (19.0 km) line was sold to become a rail trail in 2008.

As of 2006, ownership of the lines in Union County is as follows:

The north-south former "Reading Williamsport Line" along the river is divided into four sections with three owners:

- The "Lewisburg and Buffalo Creek Railroad" (LBCX) owns the track from Winfield north to West Milton. It is a non-operating railroad, although a tourist service operated on this track until the mid-1990s. As of 2006, this track is used by the UCIR for freight services.
- The "West Shore Railroad Corporation" (WSRC) owns the track from Milton, through West Milton north to New Columbia, terminating just north of Interstate 80. This track is also used by the UCIR.
- The "White Deer and Reading Railroad" (WDRR, owned by SEDA-COG JRA) owns the track from just north of Interstate 80 north to the village of White Deer (across the river from Watsontown). The local NRHS chapter also runs short excursions over this track.
- The "Union County Industrial Development Corporation" owns the out-of-service track north of Allenwood (and perhaps further north to the county line).

== See also ==
- List of Pennsylvania railroads
