= The Stourbridge Line =

Shortline railroad based in Honesdale, Pennsylvania

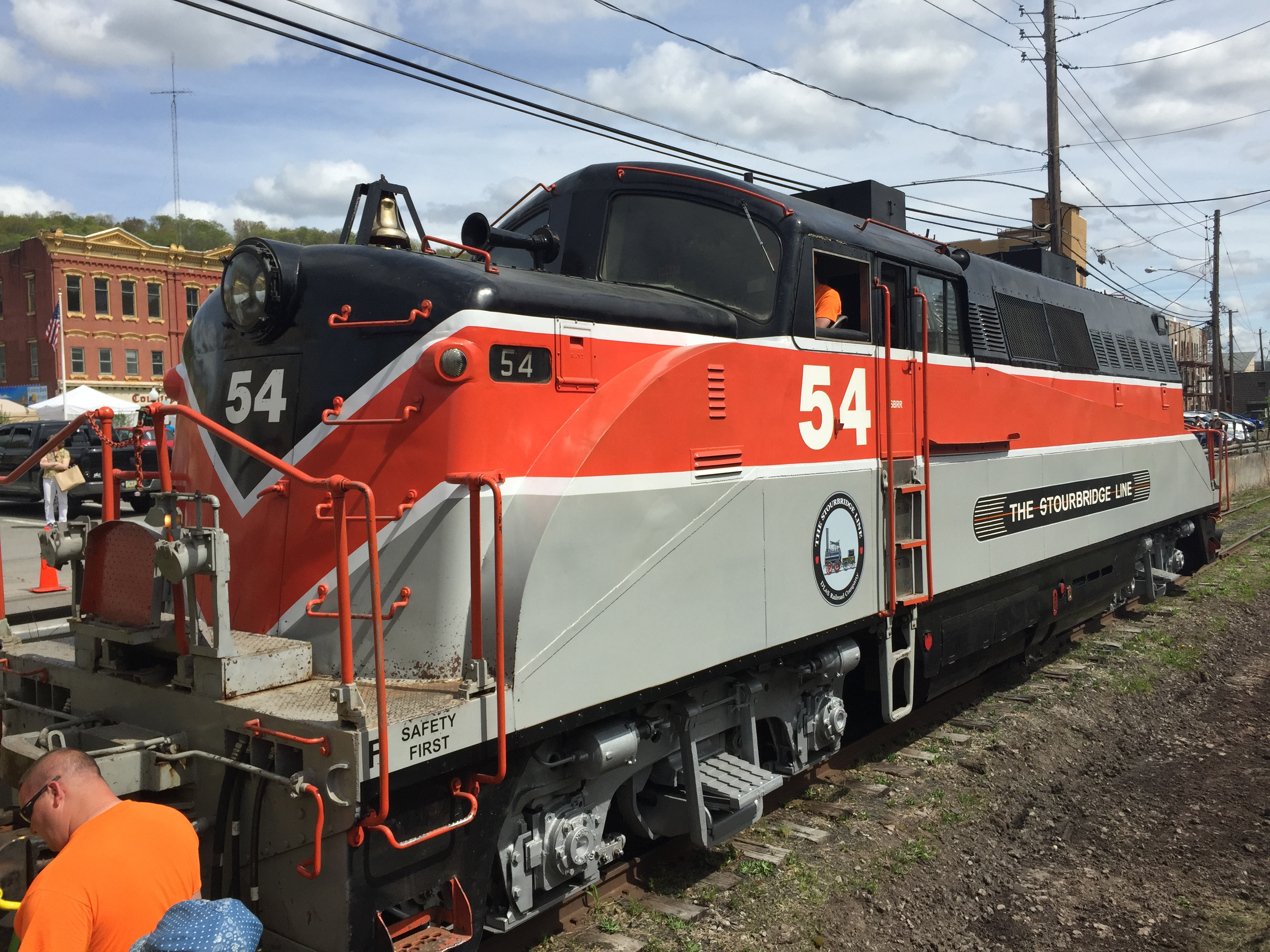
- EMD BL2 #54 at Honesdale in 2015

Overview
- Headquarters: Honesdale, Pennsylvania
- Reporting mark: DLS
- Locale: Northeastern Pennsylvania
- Dates of operation: 1976–
- Predecessor: Stourbridge Railroad

Technical
- Track gauge: 4 ft 8 1/2 in (1,435 mm) standard gauge
- Length: 25 mi (40.2 km)

Other
- Website: The Stourbridge Line.net
Route map
The Stourbridge Line route

The Stourbridge Line (/ˈstɜːr.brɪdʒ/) (reporting mark DLS) is an American Class III shortline railroad that operates tourist trains and leases a railbike operation over 25 miles (40 km) of former Erie Railroad trackage between Honesdale and Lackawaxen, Pennsylvania, in Wayne and Pike counties. There is also a station at Hawley. As of 2025, tourist trains mainly operate between Honesdale and Hawley with railbikes seasonally using the Hawley-to-Lackawaxen segment. The route is highly rural with the exceptions of the boroughs of Honesdale and Hawley, and generally follows the course of the Lackawaxen River and the Delaware and Hudson Canal.

At Lackawaxen, the branch line connects with the Central New York Railroad segment of the Southern Tier Line — also originally Erie, but owned by Norfolk Southern since 1999. The Erie became the Erie Lackawanna in 1960, and when that railroad went bankrupt in 1972, the Stourbridge line was not included in the new Conrail in 1976.

The railroad has changed ownership several times since then, from PennDOT to the Lackawaxen-Honesdale Shippers Association, to current owner businessman Paul Brancato as of 2008. Operators have varied from Robey Railroads, to the Morristown & Erie Railway (between January 2009 and 2011), to the Myles Group, operating as the Delaware, Lackawaxen & Stourbridge Railroad (DL&S) as of May 9, 2015.

== Early history ==
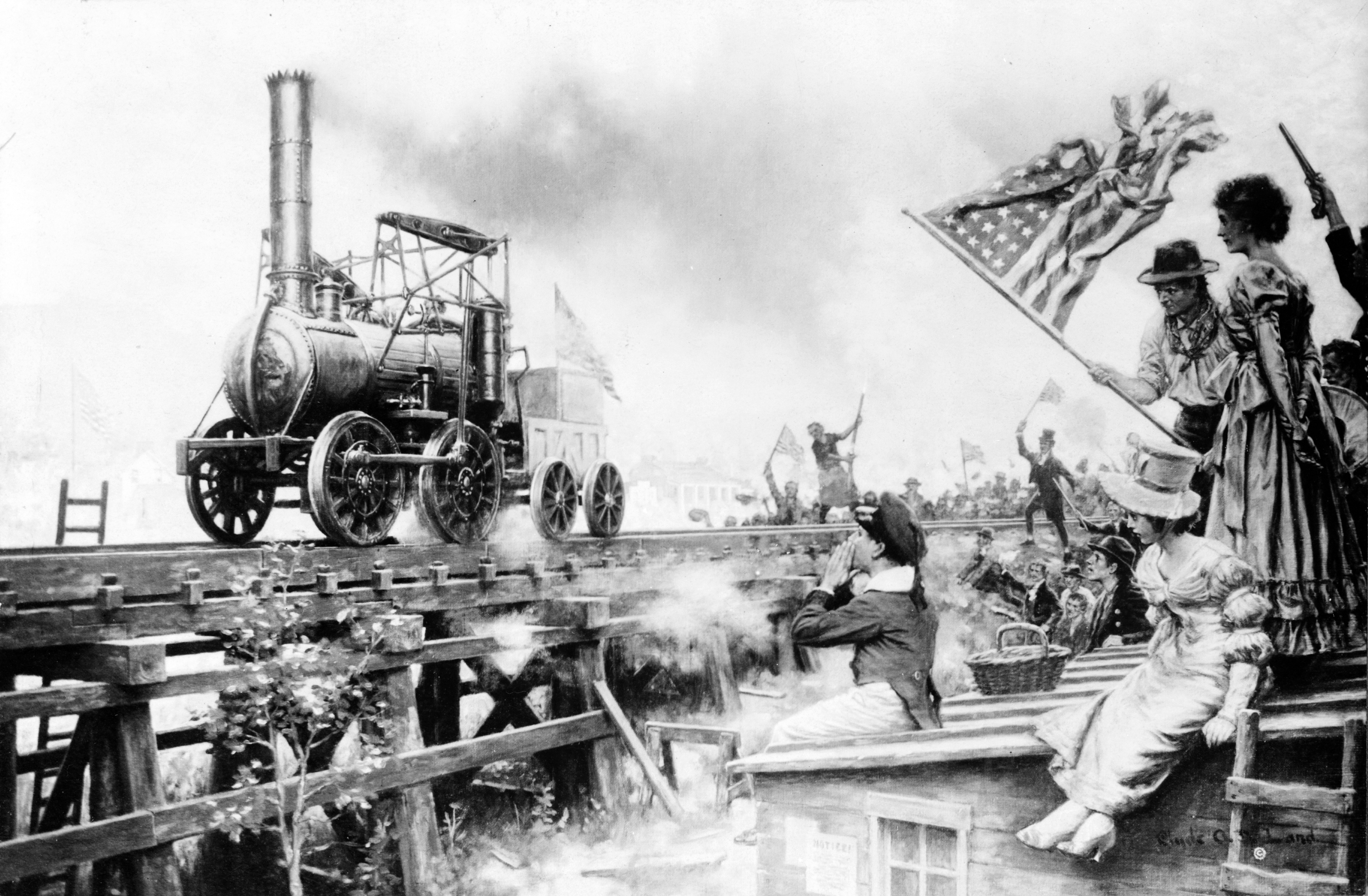
The Stourbridge Lion's first run, as depicted by Clyde Osmer DeLand c. 1916

The railroad traces its beginnings to the Delaware & Hudson Canal transporting barges of coal up from Pennsylvania and destined for the Hudson River and eventually the ports of New York City. A gravity railroad was built to carry coal over the mountains from Carbondale to Honesdale in 1829. Coal would be transferred from train to canal boat at Honesdale.

Seeking to haul greater amounts, the idea of steam-powered locomotion was proposed. The leaders in steam technology at the time were in Great Britain, so three engines were ordered and delivered to America. According to the Wayne County Chamber of Commerce, this is the site of "the first commercial locomotive on rails in the western hemisphere", (Note: Given that steam locomotives had been in commercial operation in Europe for at least 15 years, this probably should be amended to "in the Americas") taking place on August 8, 1829. The locomotive was the Stourbridge Lion. A replica is on display in Honesdale to this day. Both the gravity railroad and the canal were shut down by 1898, and the D&H left to pursue other transportation activities, namely the Delaware and Hudson Railroad.

== Erie Railroad era ==
In 1860, the Pennsylvania Coal Company began the construction of a 16-mile-long railroad from Hawley, Pennsylvania, to a connection with the Erie Railroad at Lackawaxen. This new line was quickly leased to the Erie Railroad, and it was operated as its Hawley Branch. In 1868, the charter of the Jefferson Railroad was reactivated and construction progressed from Hawley towards Honesdale, hoping to reach Carbondale. This extension would never be built, even after the Erie took over in 1870. It would continue operation as the Honesdale Branch, and coal was the primary traffic.

Coal traffic declined through the 1930s, but new local business took its place, warranting a five-day-a-week operation. In 1960, the Erie merged with the Delaware, Lackawanna and Western Railroad to form the Erie Lackawanna Railroad (EL). Traffic on the branch remained steady at about 3,000 cars per year.

Hurricane Agnes hit the East on June 22, 1972. After estimating that the damage to EL, principally between Binghamton and Salamanca, New York, amounted to $2 million ($15,393,795 today), EL filed for bankruptcy on June 26, 1972. During the reorganization of the eastern railroads, it was thought that EL might be able to reorganize on its own, and there was a proposal by Chessie System to buy a portion of the EL. However, the operating unions could not reach a compromise, and Chessie canceled the agreement. Also, by 1975, the economy in the eastern United States was affected by the 1973 oil crisis, hurting any hopes of EL being able to independently compete with government-rehabilitated Conrail lines, and EL quickly petitioned to be included in Conrail. Due to the low-density freight traffic, the Honesdale Branch was rejected from Conrail inclusion. Wayne County officials then made plans to purchase the branch from EL to avoid abandonment and to continue serving its remaining customers.

== Lackawaxen and Stourbridge ==
Proposals for short line operation were solicited by the Pennsylvania government from the Delaware Otsego Corporation (DO), Rail Service Associates (operators of the Bath and Hammondsport Railroad) and TransAction Associates. Rail Service Associates (RSA) formed the Delaware, Lackawaxen and Western Railroad to take over operations of the branch, and they began their feasibility study. Early negotiations for subsidy came with the requirement that former union employees be made an offer for work at their current salary and benefit levels. Discussions with Conrail over rate divisions did not end favorably. In March 1976, with less than a month to go before the start up of Conrail, RSA revoked their proposal.

The Commonwealth of Pennsylvania, seeking to avoid abandonment, began talks with Delaware Otsego to see if they were still interested in operating the line. Building off their success with the launch of the Central New York Railroad (CNYK), and the revival of the Cooperstown and Charlotte Valley Railroad (C&CV) and the Fonda, Johnstown and Gloversville Railroad (FJ&G), DO owner Walter Rich was confident that the Honesdale Branch would be profitable. Within two weeks before the deadline, DO formed the Lackawaxen and Stourbridge Railroad (LASB). In anticipation of the start-up, an FJ&G ALCO S-2 locomotive was transferred to Lackawaxen, and an Ex-Reading ALCO RS-3 was purchased from an equipment dealer. Operations began on the first day of Conrail operations, April 1, 1976.

The ownership of the tracks was still in question, so an emergency order was delivered by the Interstate Commerce Commission (ICC) to direct the LASB to operate the branch after March 30, 1976. The railroad's first blow was the loss of the local Agway mill in Honesdale. The railroad was purchased from the estate of EL by PennDOT, with operations managed by the Lackawaxen-Honesdale Shippers Association (LHSA) in 1977. LHSA in turn contracted DO to run the line. Full negotiations for the purchase would not conclude with EL's trustees until 1982.

In 1979, the Wayne County Chamber of Commerce launched seasonal passenger excursion service on the LASB, and DO briefly utilized some Auto-Train dome cars for the trains. From 1980 to 1982, DO used federal funding to upgrade the LASB's trackage to class II standards, which allowed trains to travel on the line at 25 miles per hour (40 km/h).

In 1986, the Wayne County Chamber of Commerce purchased a locomotive for excursion use on the line, former Bangor and Aroostook 1949-built EMD BL2 #54. DO was contracted for its maintenance, with one of the stipulations being its availability for freight use.

== Post-Delaware Otsego ==
On June 30, 1989, DO ended operations on the line. The Stourbridge Railroad (SBRR) assumed operations through contract to Robey Railroads, the operators of the North Shore Railroad, under a new subsidiary: the Stourbridge Railroad Company.

Seasonal passenger excursions continued to run, still sponsored by Wayne County's Chamber of Commerce. On January 31, 2003, ownership of the line was conveyed from PennDOT to the Lackawaxen-Honesdale Shippers Association (LHSA).

Service was suspended in 2005, when a bridge spanning the Wallenpaupack Creek was destroyed after Pennsylvania Power and Light made emergency water releases from the Lake Wallenpaupack Dam following heavy rains in April, 2005; heavy rainfalls in June 2006 further damaged the weakened structure. LHSA acquired control of the Stourbridge from Robey in July, 2006.

A grant of $800,000 from the Pennsylvania Department of Community and Economic Development, plus $703,278 worth of FEMA money, were put towards repairing the trestle over Wallenpaupack Creek. In May of 2008 the line was purchased by Paul Brancato, a principal in Ideal Steel Supply Corporation, who planned to build a steel fabrication plant at White Mills.

Operations were initially contracted to Central Penn Railroad. The line between the junction with the Southern Tier Line and Route 590 in Lackawaxen, Pennsylvania was repaired in anticipation of resumed service. It was suddenly announced, in September, 2008, that operation would transfer from Central Penn Railroad to the Morristown & Erie Railway (M&E). Operations began in January, 2009 as the Stourbridge Railway, with passenger excursions to Hawley and Lackawaxen again operated on behalf of Wayne County.

== Suspension and reopening ==
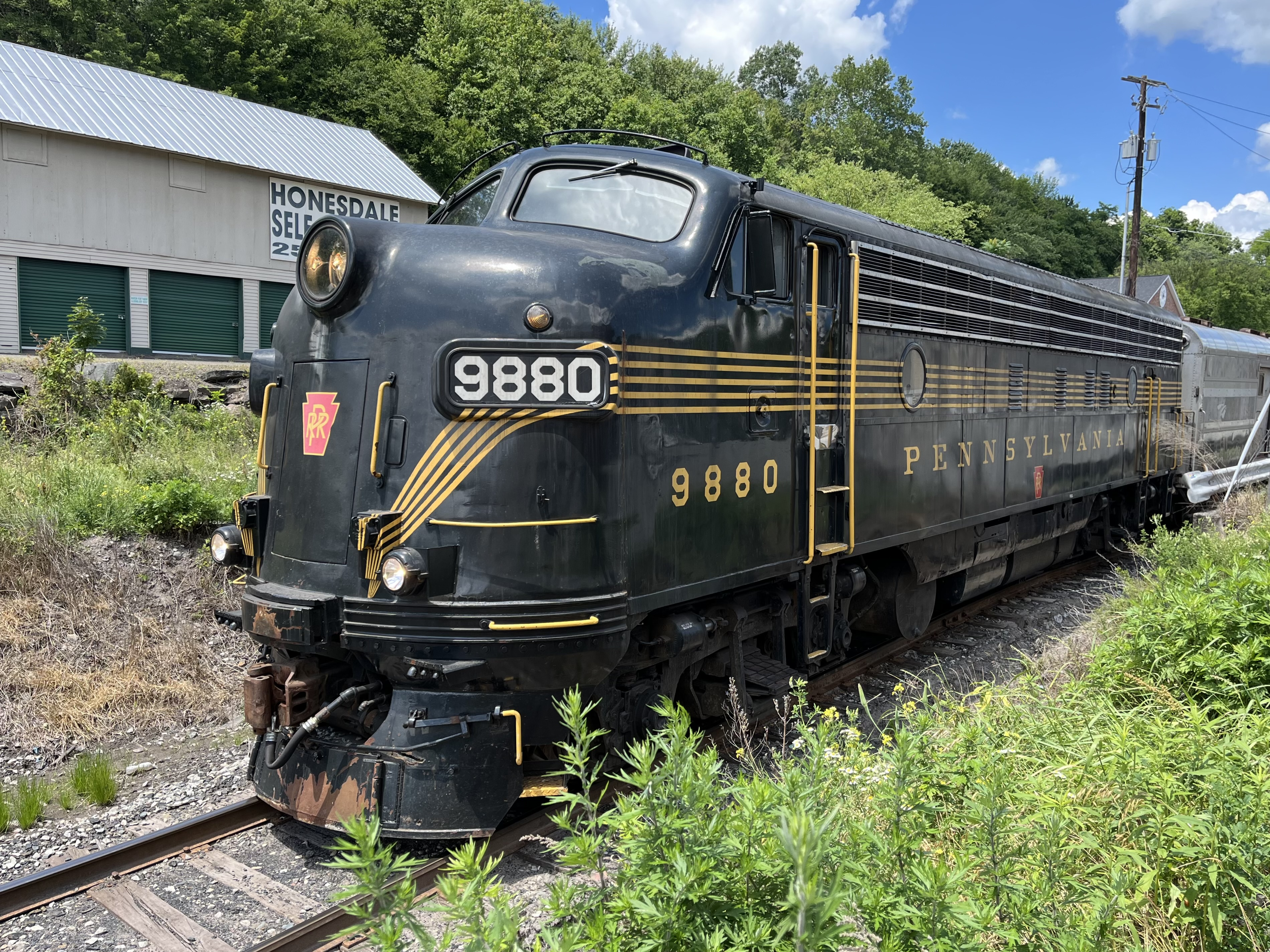
EMD FP7A 9880 about to depart Honesdale in June 2026

Citing a lack of funds, M&E withdrew service indefinitely in December, 2011. A news story dated September 11, 2012 provided additional details, stating "a lack of money is keeping the Stourbridge Line Railroad excursions in Wayne County idle for the first time in more than 30 years... [T]he train needs repairs, and so do the tracks. One reason those repairs are not being made is because the land the tracks run through is up for sale... With the tracks used by the Stourbridge line being up for sale, and all the repairs that need to be made, no one is sure when, or even if, this train will be back up and running."

The Stourbridge Line resumed operations on May 9, 2015. Operations were inaugurated by the Delaware Lackawaxen & Stourbridge Railroad (DLS) under the auspices of Myles Group, a company started by businessman Tom Myles.

Matrix of Ownership
Year	1860-1962	1962-1976	1976-1989	1989-2003	2003-2008	2008-2011	2011-2015	2015-
Owner	Erie Railroad	Erie Lackawanna	PennDOT	PennDOT	LHSA	Paul Brancato	Paul Brancato	Paul Brancato
Operator	Erie Railroad	Erie Lackawanna	LHSA	LHSA	LHSA	Paul Brancato	Paul Brancato	Paul Brancato
Railroad Operator	Erie Railroad	Erie Lackawanna	DO	Stourbridge RR Co. (SBRR)	Stourbridge RR Co. (SBRR)	Morristown and Erie	N/A	Myles Group
Railroad D/B/A	Erie Railroad	Erie Lackawanna	LASB	Stourbridge RR Co. (SBRR)	Stourbridge RR Co. (SBRR)	Stourbridge Rwy.	N/A	DL&S

== See also ==
- List of Pennsylvania railroads

== Bibliography ==
- Bailey, Michael R. (2014). "John Rastrick's Locomotives 1828–29". Loco Motion. The History Press. ISBN 978-0-7524-9101-1.
- Lewis, Edward A. (1978). "The DO Lines". The Baggage Car.
- Hartley, Scott (January 1988). "The Delaware Otsego Story". Trains: The Magazine of Railroading. Vol. 48, no. 3. Kalmbach Publishing Co.
- Shaughnessy, J. (1997). Delaware and Hudson. New York State Series. Syracuse University Press. ISBN 978-0-8156-0455-6.
