= Tioga, Pennsylvania =

Borough in Pennsylvania, United States

- Borough
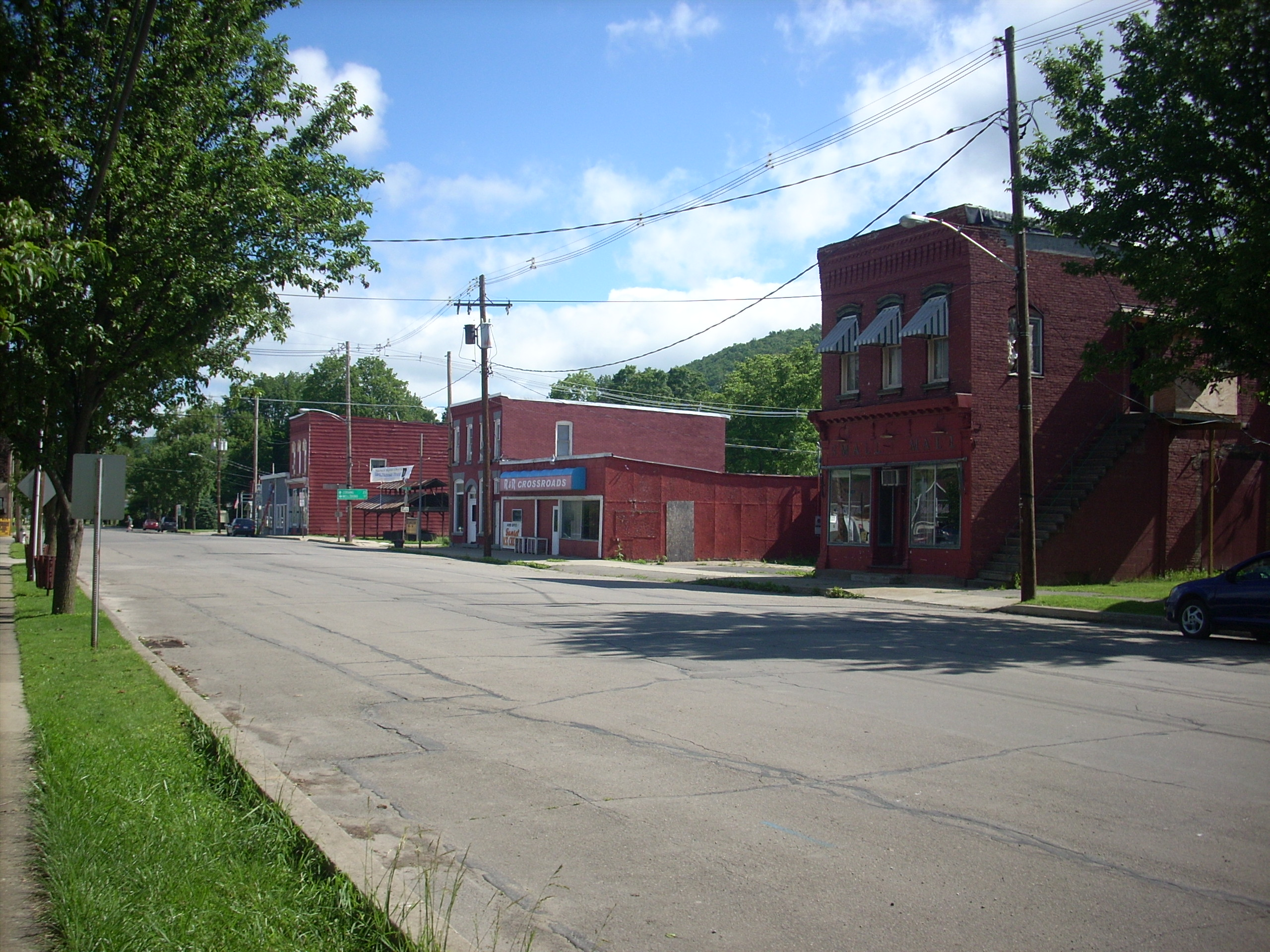
- Downtown Tioga

- Location of Tioga in Tioga County, Pennsylvania.

- Location within the U.S. state of Pennsylvania Tioga (the United States)
- Coordinates: 41°54′31″N 77°07′59″W
- Country: United States
- State: Pennsylvania
- County: Tioga
- Settled: 1798
- Incorporated: 1860

Government
  - Body: Borough Council
  - Mayor: David Wilcox (R)

Area
  - Total: 0.51 sq mi (1.32 km^{2})
  - Land: 0.46 sq mi (1.20 km^{2})
  - Water: 0.042 sq mi (0.11 km^{2})
- Elevation: 1,030 ft (310 m)

Population (2020)
  - Total: 611 ▼
  - Estimate (2021): 608
  - Density: 1,393.4/sq mi (538.01/km^{2})
- Time zone: Eastern (EST)
  - Summer (DST): EDT
- ZIP code: 16946
- Area code: 570
- FIPS code: 42-76808
- Website: https://tiogaborough.org/

Tioga is a borough in Tioga County, Pennsylvania, United States. As of the 2020 census, Tioga had a population of 606. It is located north of Tioga and Hammond Lakes along the Tioga River.

== Etymology ==
The name "Tioga" is borrowed from Native American tribes who lived in the area at the time of the arrival of European colonists; it means "at the forks". The various Iroquois tribes all had similar words for the concept: the Oneida called it Te-ah-o-ge, the Mohawk called it Te-yo-ge-ga, the Cayuga called it Da-o-ga and the Seneca called it Da-yo-o-geh.

== History ==
=== Officer hiring controversy ===
On July 5, 2022, Officer Timothy Loehmann was sworn in as Tioga's only police officer. In 2014, Loehmann, while employed as a police officer in Cleveland, had shot and killed 12-year-old Tamir Rice who at the time was holding a pellet gun. Loehmann was never charged with a crime, but the incident caused protests. His hiring by Tioga's borough council caused a public backlash. A week later the resignations of Loehmann, the borough council president, another council member, the borough attorney, and the borough's code enforcement officer were accepted by the borough council. According to Pennsylvania Attorney General Josh Shapiro, the borough broke the law by failing to perform a proper background check before hiring Loehmann.

An investigation by Spotlight PA later found Loehmann was properly hired, but state law concerning background checks for law enforcement hires lacked the capabilities to flag Loehmann because he had not been previously employed as a law enforcement officer in Pennsylvania. The investigation also found a string of personal disputes between members of the borough government, including the mayor and councilmembers, and contradictory statements from those involved in Loehmann's hiring.

== Geography ==
Tioga is located at 41°54′23″N 77°8′8″W (41.906467, -77.135532).

According to the United States Census Bureau, the borough has a total area of 0.5 square miles (1.3 km^{2}), of which 0.4 square miles (1.0 km^{2}) is land and 0.1 square miles (0.26 km^{2}) (17.31%) is water.

Tioga is surrounded by Tioga Township.

== Demographics ==
Historical population
Census	Pop.	Note	%±
1860	450		—
1870	440		−2.2%
1880	520		18.2%
1890	557		7.1%
1900	524		−5.9%
1910	533		1.7%
1920	368		−31.0%
1930	431		17.1%
1940	460		6.7%
1950	544		18.3%
1960	597		9.7%
1970	624		4.5%
1980	613		−1.8%
1990	638		4.1%
2000	622		−2.5%
2010	666		7.1%
2020	606		−9.0%
2021 (est.)	608	▲	0.3%

As of the census of 2000, there were 622 people, 239 households, and 148 families residing in the borough. The population density was 1,440.0 inhabitants per square mile (556.0/km^{2}). There were 261 housing units at an average density of 604.2 per square mile (233.3/km^{2}). The racial makeup of the borough was 99.04% White, 0.32% African American, 0.16% Native American, and 0.48% from two or more races. Hispanic or Latino of any race were 0.32% of the population.

There were 239 households, out of which 37.2% had children under the age of 18 living with them, 48.5% were married couples living together, 10.5% had a female householder with no husband present, and 37.7% were non-families. 28.0% of all households were made up of individuals, and 10.0% had someone living alone who was 65 years of age or older. The average household size was 2.57 and the average family size was 3.23.

In the borough the population was spread out, with 31.0% under the age of 18, 9.5% from 18 to 24, 29.6% from 25 to 44, 16.7% from 45 to 64, and 13.2% who were 65 years of age or older. The median age was 32 years. For every 100 females there were 90.2 males. For every 100 females age 18 and over, there were 92.4 males.

The median income for a household in the borough was $27,404, and the median income for a family was $34,500. Males had a median income of $29,519 versus $19,479 for females. The per capita income for the borough was $16,905. About 8.8% of families and 13.2% of the population were below the poverty line, including 15.6% of those under age 18 and 4.9% of those age 65 or over.

== Education ==
It is in the Northern Tioga School District.

== See also ==
- Tioga Railroad
- Tioga Center, New York
