= National Register of Historic Places listings in Sullivan County, Pennsylvania =

Location of Sullivan County in Pennsylvania

Sullivan County, Pennsylvania, has seven properties and districts listed on the National Register of Historic Places. The locations of National Register properties and districts for which the latitude and longitude coordinates are included below, may be seen in a map.

This National Park Service list is complete through NPS recent listings posted August 29, 2025.

== Current listings ==
	Name on the Register	Image	Date listed	Location	City or town	Description
1	Eagles Mere Historic District	Eagles Mere Historic District	June 28, 1996 (#96000718)	Roughly bounded by Pennsylvania Route 42, Borough boundary, Loyalsock State Forest and Eagles Mere Golf Club; 41°25′02″N 76°34′36″W	Eagles Mere and Shrewsbury Township	Boundary increase on September 18, 2013.
2	Forksville Covered Bridge	Forksville Covered Bridge	July 24, 1980 (#80003639)	Legislative Route 56007 spur 41°29′18″N 76°36′00″W	Forksville	
3	Hillsgrove Covered Bridge	Hillsgrove Covered Bridge	July 2, 1973 (#73001666)	3 miles (4.8 km) east of Hillsgrove off Pennsylvania Route 87 over Loyalsock Creek; 41°27′39″N 76°40′17″W	Hillsgrove Township	
4	Clemuel Ricketts Mansion	Clemuel Ricketts Mansion	June 9, 1983 (#83002284)	Off Pennsylvania Route 487; 41°21′08″N 76°19′14″W	Colley Township	
5	Sonestown Covered Bridge	Sonestown Covered Bridge	July 24, 1980 (#80003640)	South of Sonestown on Township 310; 41°20′47″N 76°33′19″W	Davidson Township	
6	Sullivan County Courthouse	Sullivan County Courthouse	December 15, 1978 (#78002472)	Main and Muncy Streets; 41°25′25″N 76°29′39″W	Laporte	
7	Worlds End State Park Family Cabin District	Worlds End State Park Family Cabin District	May 18, 1987 (#87000742)	2 miles (3.2 km) southeast of Forksville on Pennsylvania Route 154; 41°28′02″N 76°34′35″W	Forks Township	

== See also ==
- List of Pennsylvania state historical markers in Sullivan County
