= Pennsylvania Route 154 =

State highway in Pennsylvania, US

Pennsylvania Route 154

Route information
- Maintained by PennDOT
- Length: 31.498 mi (50.691 km)

Major junctions
- South end: US 220 in Laporte
- PA 87 in Forksville
- North end: PA 414 in Canton

Location
- Country: United States
- State: Pennsylvania
- Counties: Sullivan, Bradford

Highway system
- Pennsylvania State Route System; Interstate; US; State; Scenic; Legislative
← PA 153	→ PA 155

Pennsylvania Route 154 (PA 154) is a 31.5-mile-long (50.7 km) northwest-southeast state highway located in northern Pennsylvania. The southern terminus is at U.S. Route 220 (US 220) in Laporte. The northern terminus of the route is at PA 414 in Canton.

The road is called South Minnequa Avenue for half a mile at its northern terminus in Canton. It then becomes Lake Hill Road for two miles (3 km), and later Wheelerville Mountain Road for three miles (5 km). It goes through the small villages of Wheelerville, Shunk, Lincoln Falls, and Estella before going down a hill toward Forksville. It serves as a corner of Church Street in Forksville, just south of its brief intersection with PA 87. The road then zig zags (concurring with PA 87), crossing the Little Loyalsock Creek in the process. The remainder of the highway meanders with the Loyalsock Creek going through Worlds End State Park before terminating at US 220 north of the county seat of Laporte.

From 1928 to 1946, PA 154 once continued along a concurrency with US 220 into Laporte, before turning off towards Nordmont and Emmons before ending at PA 115 at Coles Creek.

== Route description ==
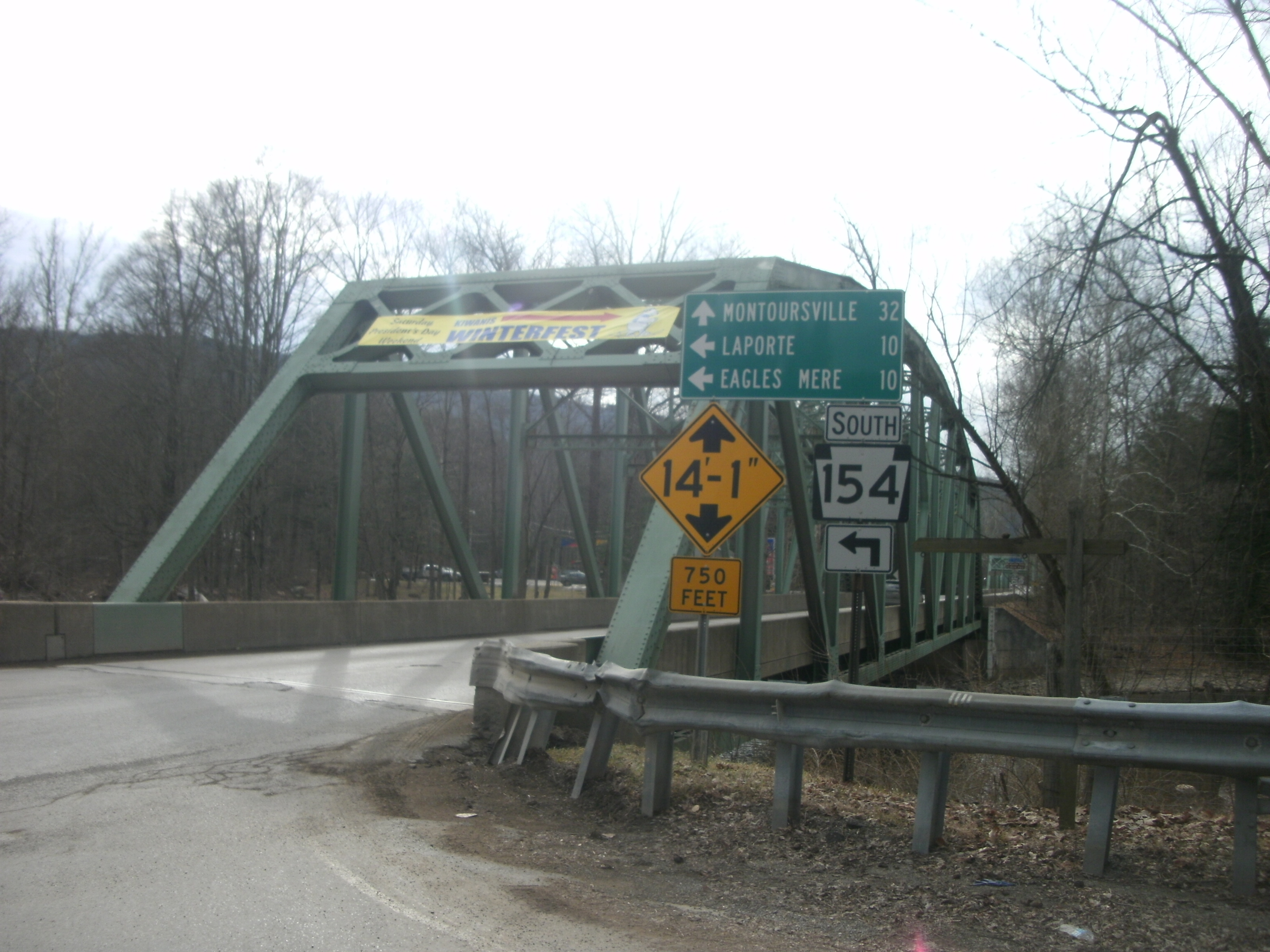
PA 87/PA 154 southbound over Little Loyalsock Creek in Forksville.

PA 154 begins at an intersection with US 220 in Laporte Township, Sullivan County, heading northwest on a two-lane undivided road. The route winds through forested areas, turning to the west and running along the south bank of Loyalsock Creek within the Loyalsock State Forest. The road heads through a small corner of Shrewsbury Township before crossing into Forks Township and winding northwest through more forests next to the creek. PA 154 passes through Worlds End State Park, where it crosses to the other side of the creek, before heading through more of the Loyalsock State Forest. The road enters the borough of Forksville and heads past a few homes as well as the Forksville Covered Bridge over the Loyalsock Creek. PA 154 comes to an intersection with PA 87, turning east to form a brief concurrency with that route, crossing the Little Loyalsock Creek.

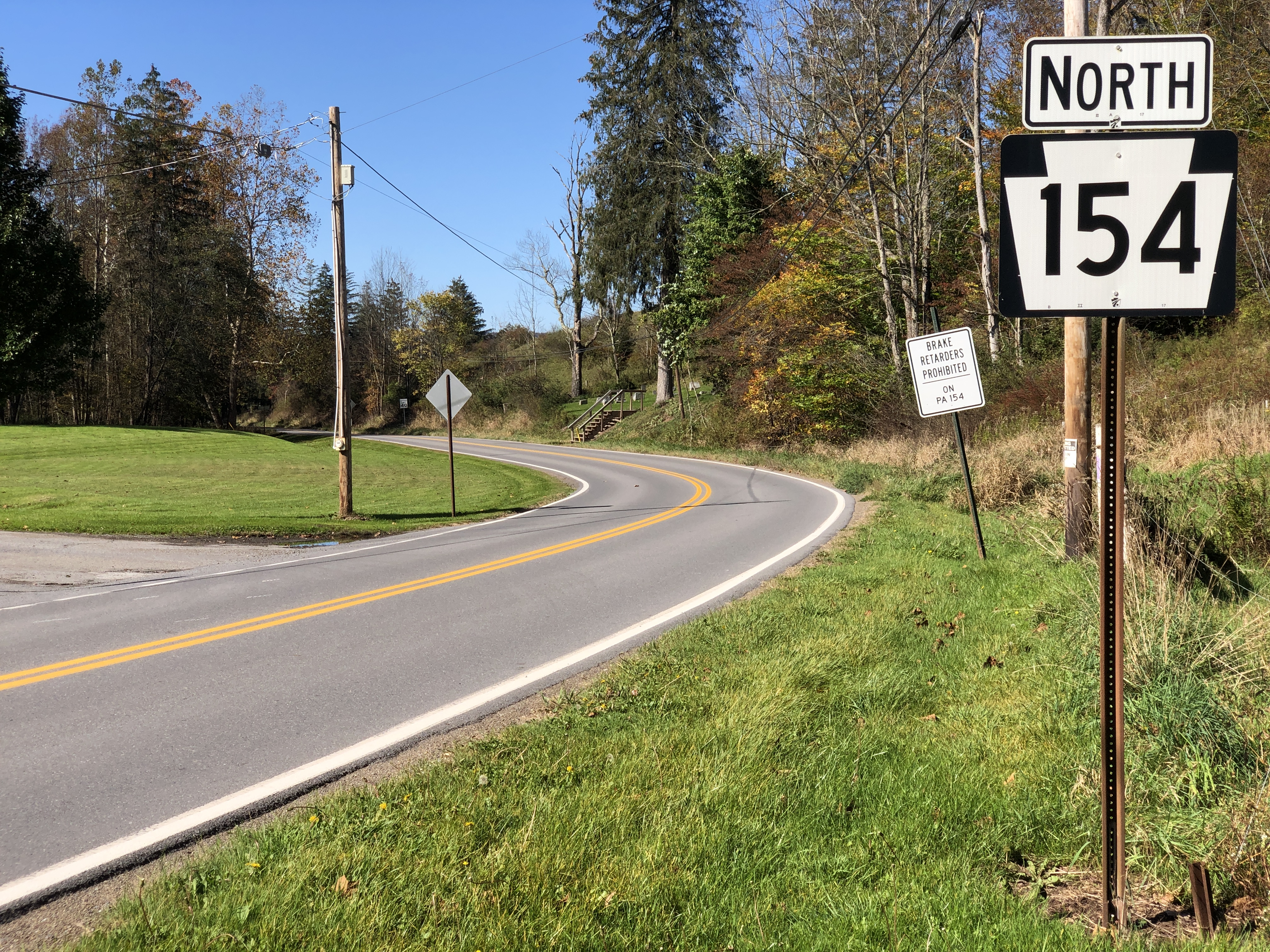
PA 154 northbound in Elkland Township

After this, PA 154 splits from PA 87 by turning northwest and continues through more forests, crossing into Elkland Township. The road turns north into a mix of farmland and woodland with some homes, turning west at Estella. The route winds northwest through more rural areas, passing through Lincoln Falls. PA 154 briefly enters Fox Township before heading back into Elkland Township. The road crosses into Fox Township again and runs through more agricultural and wooded areas with some residences, turning west before curving back to the northwest at Shunk. The route winds northwest and enters more forested areas, passing through Wheelerville.

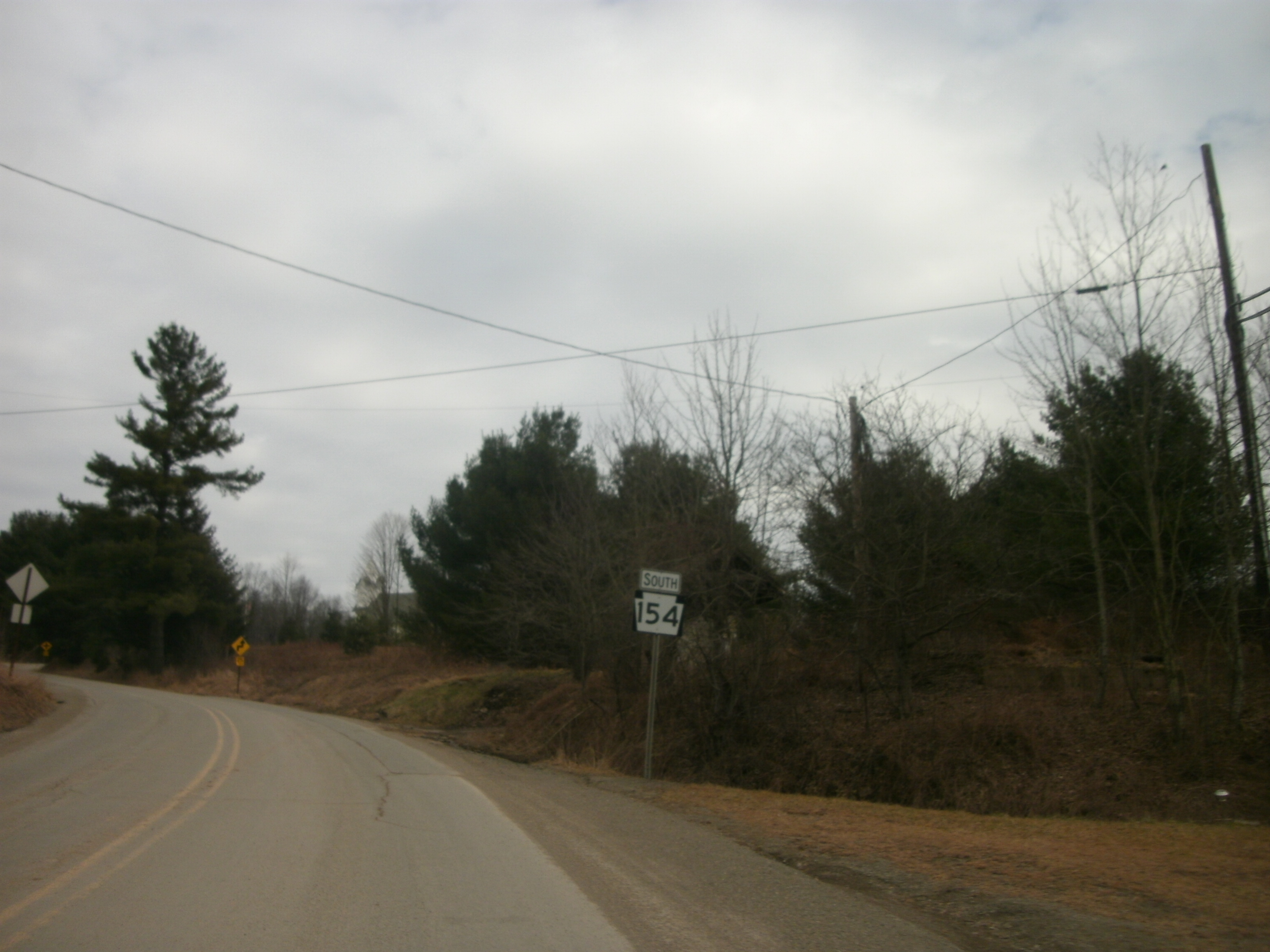
PA 154 southbound as a two-lane road through Fox Township in Sullivan County.

PA 154 enters Canton Township in Bradford County and becomes Wheelerville Mountain Road, heading north through dense forests. The route curves northwest, turning north onto Beech Flats Road and running through areas of woods and fields. PA 154 turns west onto Lake Hill Road at Beech Flats and passes through more farmland and woodland with some homes. The road curves to the north and passes through more rural areas before heading into the borough of Canton. The route becomes South Minnequa Avenue and heads into residential areas, crossing the Towanda Creek. PA 154 continues to its northern terminus at an intersection with PA 414 in the commercial center of town.

== Major intersections ==
County	Location	mi	km	Destinations	Notes
Sullivan	Laporte Township	0.000	0.000	US 220 (Appalachian Throughway) – Laporte, Williamsport, Dushore	Southern terminus
Sullivan	Forksville	9.446	15.202	PA 87 south – Montoursville	South end of PA 87 concurrency
Sullivan	Forksville	9.553	15.374	PA 87 north – Dushore	North end of PA 87 concurrency
Bradford	Canton	31.498	50.691	PA 414 (Main Street) – Ogdensburg, Monroe	Northern terminus
1.000 mi = 1.609 km; 1.000 km = 0.621 mi: Concurrency terminus
