= List of municipalities in Sullivan County, Pennsylvania =

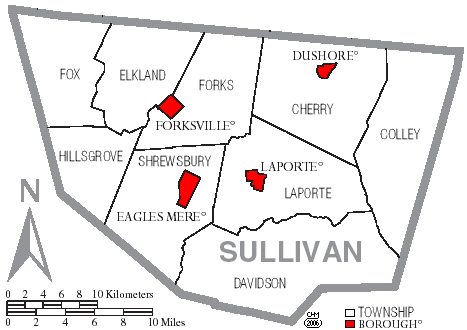
Map of Sullivan County, Pennsylvania with Municipal Labels showing Boroughs (red) and Townships (white)

Location of Sullivan County within Pennsylvania

Sullivan County, Pennsylvania, United States, is divided into 13 incorporated municipalities. State law defines the two kinds of municipalities present in the county: four boroughs and nine townships. In the 2010 census, the population of Sullivan County was 6,428, making it an "Eighth Class County", defined by Pennsylvania law as "having a population of less than 20,000 inhabitants". Its county seat is Laporte, which was the smallest county seat in Pennsylvania by population, as of 2001.

Sullivan County is located in north central Pennsylvania, about 123 miles (198 km) northwest of Philadelphia and 195 miles (314 km) east-northeast of Pittsburgh. The county covers 452 square miles (1,170 km^{2}), of which 450 square miles (1,165 km^{2}) is land and 2 square miles (5.2 km^{2}) (0.53%) is water. Its municipalities range in size from the borough of Dushore with 0.9 square miles (2.3 km^{2}) to Davidson Township with 78.2 square miles (203 km^{2}). Cherry Township has the highest population of any municipality (1,705 or 26.5% of the county total as of 2010), while the borough of Eagles Mere has the lowest population (120 or 1.9%).

Although Sullivan County has boroughs and townships, it has no cities. Any municipality in Pennsylvania with more than 10 persons can incorporate as a borough. Any township or borough with a population of at least 10,000 can ask the state legislature to become chartered as a city. However, as Sullivan County has a population of only 6,428, it has no cities. There are no unincorporated areas in the county, since all territory in Pennsylvania is incorporated.

== History ==
The land which became Sullivan County was purchased from the Iroquois by the Province of Pennsylvania in 1768, as part of the first Treaty of Fort Stanwix. It was part of Northumberland County, then became part of Lycoming County when it was formed in 1795. Sullivan County itself was formed from the northeastern part of Lycoming County on March 15, 1847. It was the thirteenth and last county formed at least partly from Lycoming County, and the fifth entirely formed from it.

According to the official state publication The Pennsylvania Manual (2011), Sullivan County was named for Pennsylvania state senator Charles C. Sullivan, who "took an active part in procuring passage of the bill" establishing the county. However, according to former Pennsylvania state librarian Frederic A. Godcharles (1933) and oliver P. Williams' County Courthouses of Pennsylvania: A Guide (2001), the county is named for General John Sullivan, who led the Sullivan Expedition against the Iroquois in 1779.

While all four boroughs were formed after Sullivan County was established, seven of the nine townships were formed while still part of Lycoming County. The first of these was Shrewsbury Township, which encompassed all of modern Sullivan County when it was formed in 1803. Elkland Township was formed from Shrewsbury in 1804, as were Cherry (1824), Davidson (1833), and Forks Townships (1833). Plunketts Creek Township was formed from Franklin and Davidson Townships in 1838, and Fox Township was formed from Elkland in 1839. When Sullivan County was formed in 1847, both Shrewsbury and Plunketts Creek Townships were split, with each county having a township of that name. Plunketts Creek Township in Sullivan County changed its name to Hillsgrove Township in 1856. Sullivan County has no former townships, and no counties have been formed from it.

When formed in 1847, Sullivan County had no boroughs. The unincorporated village of Cherry Hill in Cherry Township served as the first county seat until 1850, when Laporte was founded in the geographic center of the county, and became its new county seat. In 1850 the population of the county was 3,694 and it grew steadily to a peak of 12,134 in 1900. This was just after the borough of Eagles Mere was incorporated as the last of the county's municipalities, in 1899. Much of this growth was fueled by lumber-based industry, but the virgin forests were almost all gone by 1900 and the population declined in eight of eleven decades since then, decreasing by a total of 47% between 1900 and 2010.

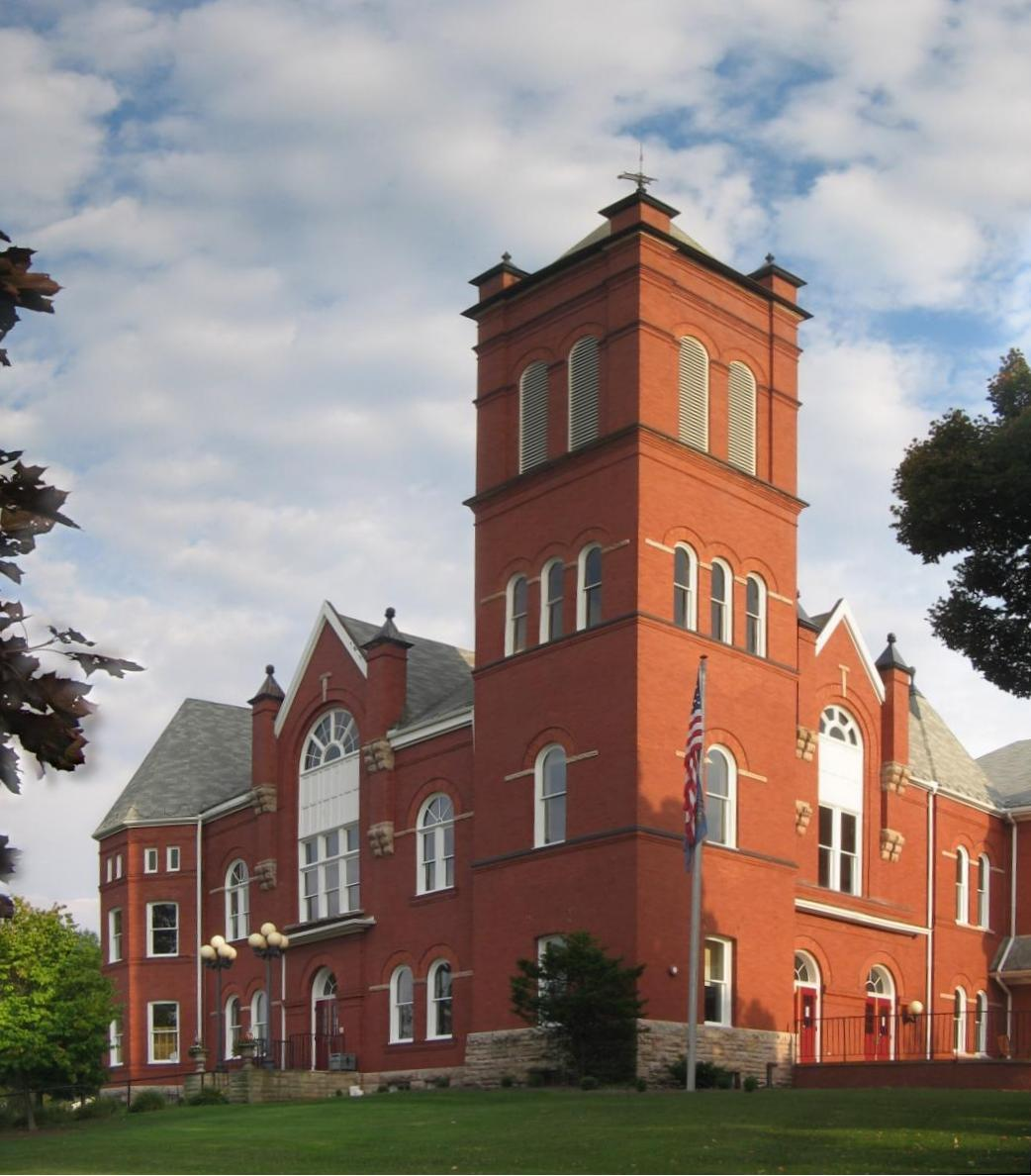
Sullivan County Courthouse, Laporte

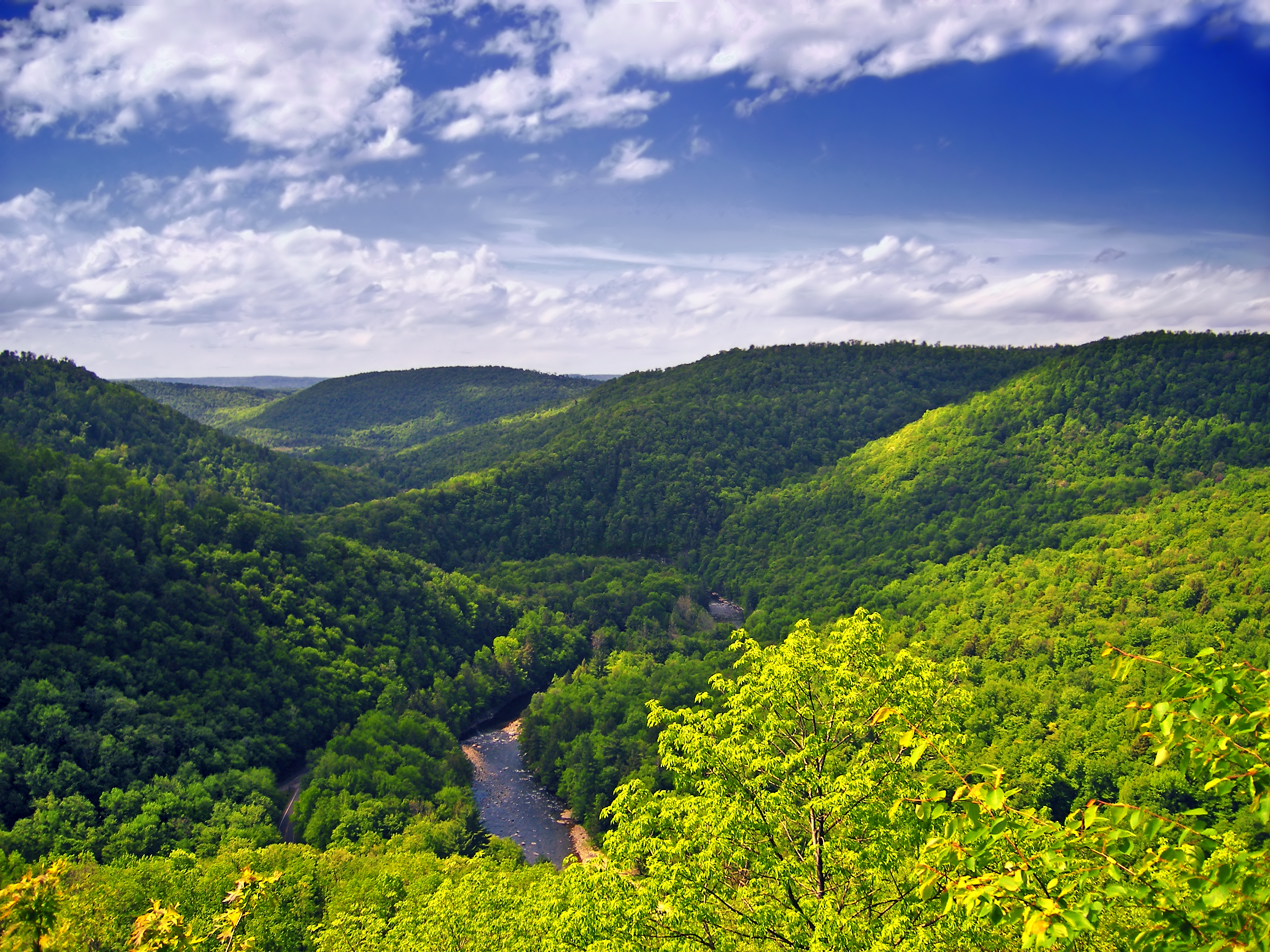
Worlds End State Park, Forks Township

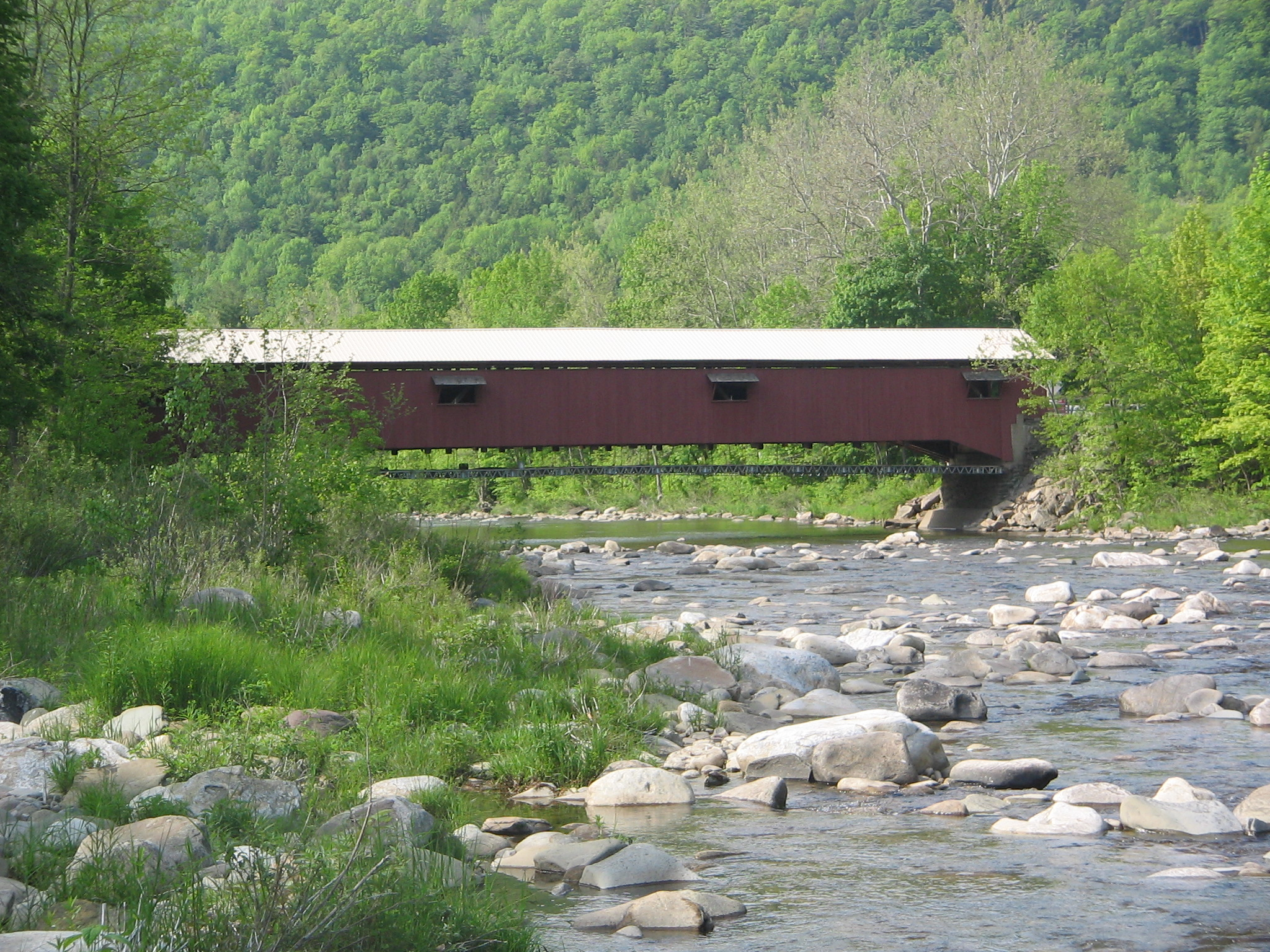
Forksville Covered Bridge in Forksville

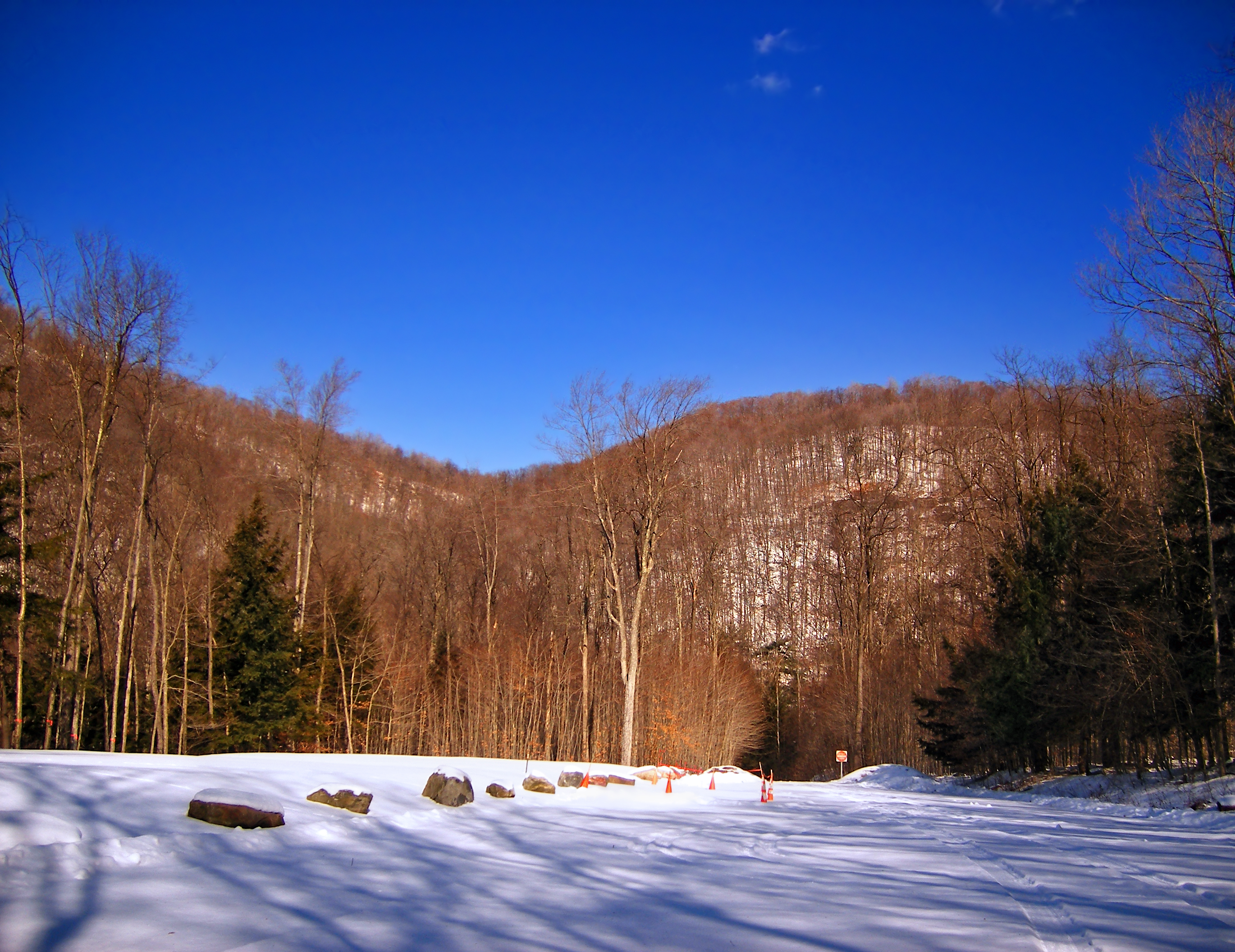
Loyalsock State Forest, Hillsgrove Township

== Municipalities ==
Incorporated municipalities of Sullivan County, Pennsylvania
Municipality (type)	Remarks	Settled	Incorporated	Formed from	Area	Population (2010)	Map	Photo
Dushore (borough)	Named for Aristide Aubert Du Petit Thouars, a French settler who built the first cabin. Dushore is a corruption of "Du Petit Thouars".	1794	1859	Cherry Township	0.9 sq mi (2.3 km^{2})	608	A small borough in the northeast of the county	
Eagles Mere (borough)	Named for "Eagles Mere Lake" in its center, which was itself named for bald eagles and "mere", a term for a broad and shallow lake.	1877	1899	Shrewsbury Township	2.2 sq mi (5.8 km^{2})	120	A small borough in the western center of the county	
Forksville (borough)	Named for the confluence ("forks") of Little Loyalsock Creek with Loyalsock Creek in the borough.	1794	1880	Forks Township	1.5 sq mi (3.9 km^{2})	145	A small borough in the northwest center of the county	
Laporte (borough)	County seat; named for John Laporte, member of the U.S. House of Representatives and last surveyor general of Pennsylvania.	1850	1853	Laporte Township	1.3 sq mi (3.3 km^{2})	316	A small borough in the southeast center of the county	
Cherry Township	Named for stands of old growth cherry trees or the village of Cherry Hill.	1816	1824	Shrewsbury Township, while part of Lycoming County	57.8 sq mi (149.8 km^{2})	1,705	A large township in the northeast of the county	
Colley Township	Named for William Colley, local businessman and judge.	1823	1849	Cherry Township	59.0 sq mi (152.8 km^{2})	694	A large township in the east of the county	
Davidson Township	Named for Asher Davidson, an associate judge of Lycoming County.	1806	1833	Shrewsbury Township, while part of Lycoming County	78.2 sq mi (202.5 km^{2})	573	a large township in the south of the county	
Elkland Township	Named for the elk that once lived in the area.	1798	1804	Shrewsbury Township, while part of Lycoming County	38.7 sq mi (100.2 km^{2})	577	A medium size township in the northwest of the county	
Forks Township	Named for the confluence ("forks") of Little Loyalsock Creek with Loyalsock Creek, now in Forksville.	1794	1833	Shrewsbury Township, while part of Lycoming County	43.9 sq mi (113.7 km^{2})	377	A medium size township in the north of the county	
Fox Township	Named for George Fox, the founder of the Religious Society of Friends.	1800	1839	Elkland Township, while part of Lycoming County	38.6 sq mi (100.0 km^{2})	358	A medium size township in the northwest of the county	
Hillsgrove Township	Named for John Hill, a prominent early settler, and the village of Hillsgrove he founded as Plunketts Creek Township The name was changed in 1856.	1786	1838	Davidson and Franklin Townships, while part of Lycoming County	28.4 sq mi (73.6 km^{2})	287	A medium size township in the west of the county	
Laporte Township	Named for John LaPorte, member of the U.S. House of Representatives and last surveyor general of Pennsylvania.	1830	1850	Cherry, Davidson and Shrewsbury Townships	53.7 sq mi (139.2 km^{2})	349	A large township in the center of the county	
Shrewsbury Township	Named for Shrewsbury Township, New Jersey.	1799	1803	Muncy Township, while part of Lycoming County	48.1 sq mi (124.5 km^{2})	319	A medium size township in the southwest of the county	

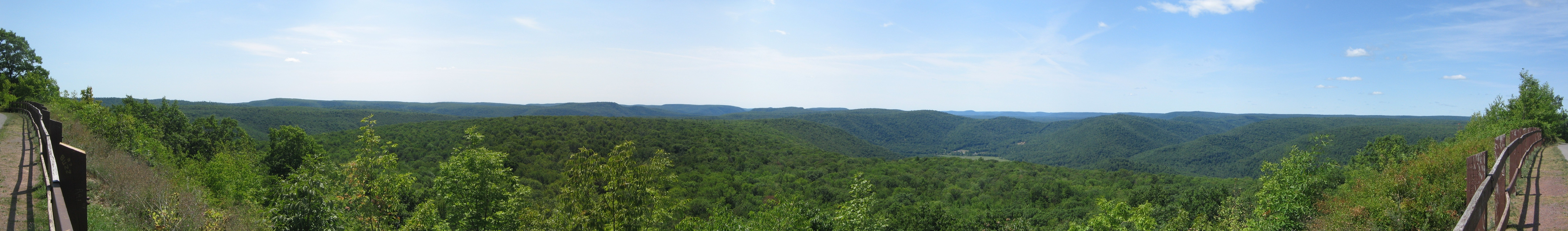
Panorama of the Loyalsock State Forest from the High Knob Panorama in Hillsgrove Township. Note the relatively level height of the horizon, as this area is part of the dissected Allegheny Plateau.

== Clickable map ==
The map shown below is clickable; click on any municipality name to be redirected to the article for that borough or township.

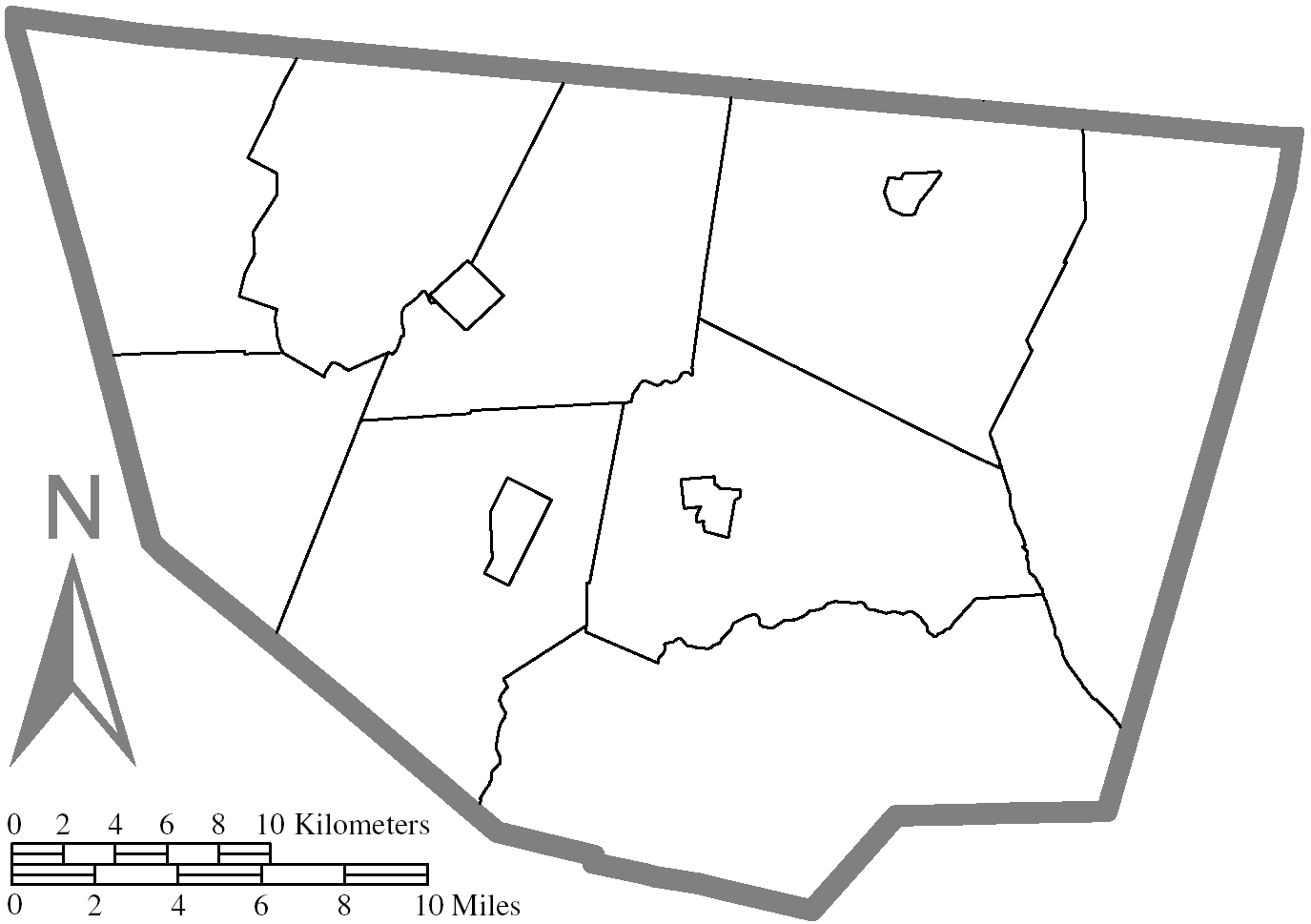

== See also ==
- Loyalsock State Forest
- Worlds End State Park
- Ricketts Glen State Park
