= Shunk, Pennsylvania =

Unincorporated community in Pennsylvania, US

- Unincorporated community
- Location within Pennsylvania
- Coordinates: 41°32′46″N 76°44′34″W
- Country: United States
- State: Pennsylvania
- County: Sullivan
- Elevation: 1,486 ft (453 m)
- Time zone: UTC-5 (Eastern (EST))
  - Summer (DST): UTC-4 (EDT)
- ZIP code: 17768
- Area codes: 272 & 570
- GNIS feature ID: 1193357

Shunk is an unincorporated community in Sullivan County, Pennsylvania, United States. The community is located along Pennsylvania Route 154, 8.4 miles (13.5 km) west-northwest of Forksville. Shunk has a post office with ZIP code 17768, which opened on November 5, 1845.
