= Forks Township, Pennsylvania =

Forks Township, Pennsylvania may refer to:

- Forks Township, Northampton County, Pennsylvania
- Forks Township, Sullivan County, Pennsylvania
