= Shrewsbury Township, Pennsylvania =

Shrewsbury Township, Pennsylvania may refer to:

- Shrewsbury Township, Lycoming County, Pennsylvania
- Shrewsbury Township, Sullivan County, Pennsylvania
- Shrewsbury Township, York County, Pennsylvania
