= Elkland Township, Sullivan County, Pennsylvania =

Township in Pennsylvania, US

Coordinates: 41°29′30″N 76°37′59″W

Elkland Township, Pennsylvania
- Township
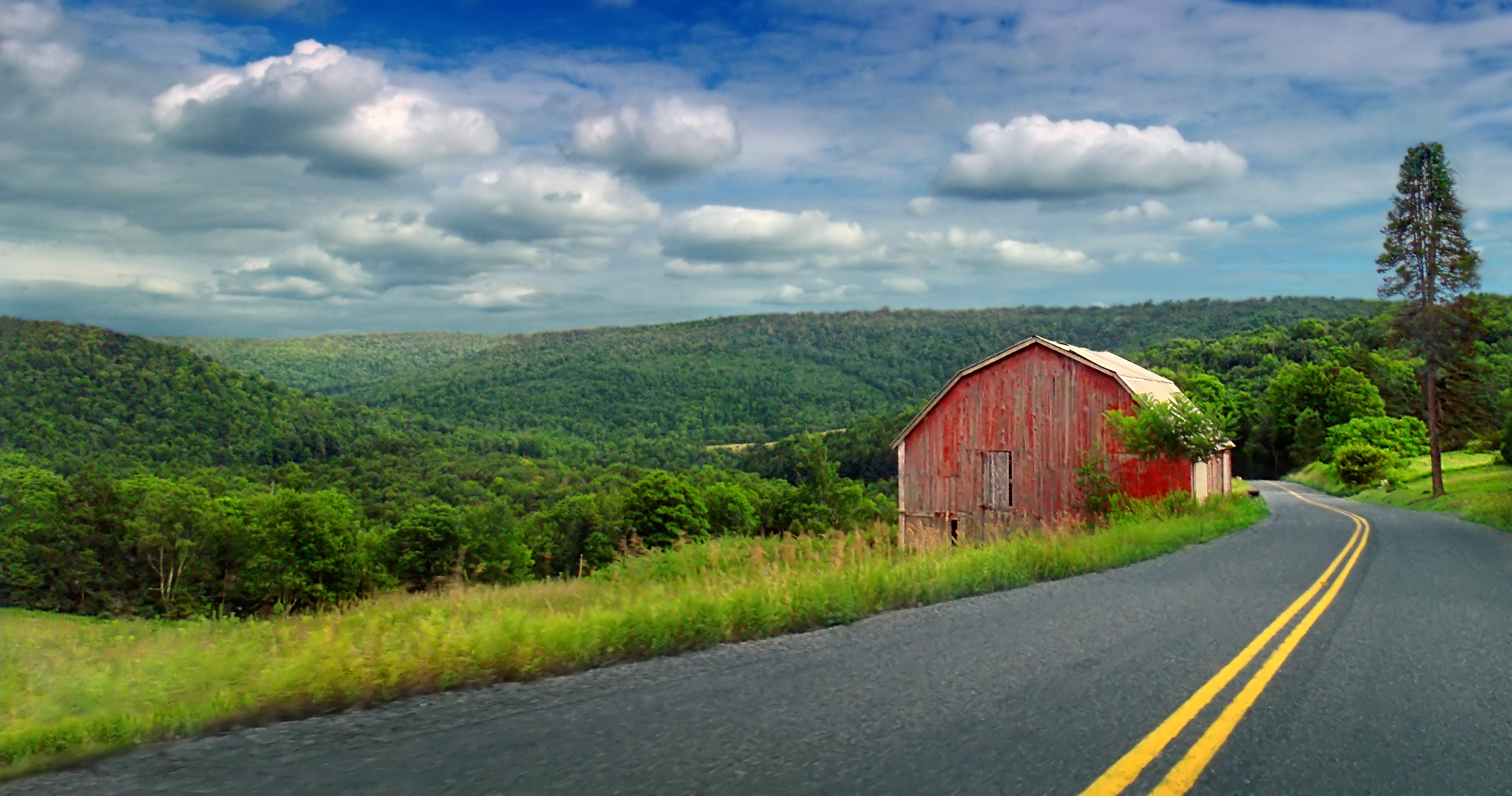
- Pennsylvania Route 154 as it passes through the township with the Allegheny Plateau in the background

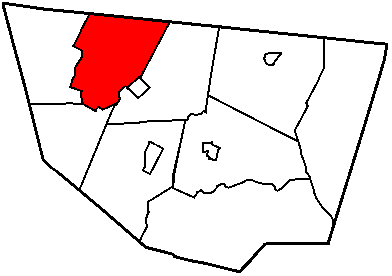
- Map of Sullivan County, Pennsylvania highlighting Elkland Township

- Map of Pennsylvania highlighting Sullivan County
- Country: United States
- State: Pennsylvania
- County: Sullivan
- Settled: 1798
- Incorporated: 1804

Area
  - Total: 38.69 sq mi (100.21 km^{2})
  - Land: 38.46 sq mi (99.61 km^{2})
  - Water: 0.23 sq mi (0.60 km^{2})

Population (2020)
  - Total: 547 ▼
  - Estimate (2021): 549
  - Density: 14.1/sq mi (5.46/km^{2})
- Time zone: UTC-5 (Eastern (EST))
  - Summer (DST): UTC-4 (EDT)
- ZIP Code: 18616
- Area code: 570
- FIPS code: 42-113-23144

Elkland Township is a township in Sullivan County, Pennsylvania, United States. The population was 547 at the 2020 census.

== Geography ==
According to the United States Census Bureau, the township has a total area of 38.7 square miles (100 km^{2}), of which 38.46 square miles (99.6 km^{2}) is land and 0.23 square miles (0.60 km^{2}) (0.6%) is water.

Elkland Township is bordered by Bradford County to the north, Forks Township and Forksville to the east, Hillsgrove Township to the south and Fox Township to the west.

== Demographics ==
Historical population
Census	Pop.	Note	%±
2010	577		—
2020	547		−5.2%
2021 (est.)	549		0.4%
U.S. Decennial Census

=== 2010 ===
At the 2010 census there were 577 people, 236 households, and 157 families in the township. The population density was 15 people per square mile (5.8 people/km^{2}). There were 512 housing units at an average density of 13.3 per square mile (5.1/km^{2}). The racial makeup of the township was 97.6% White, 0.5% African American, 0.3% Native American, 0.3% Asian, and 1.2% from two or more races. Hispanic or Latino of any race were 0.5%.

Of the 236 households 21.2% had children under the age of 18 living with them, 57.2% were married couples living together, 4.7% had a female householder with no husband present, and 33.5% were non-families. 30.1% of households were one person and 14.9% were one person aged 65 or older. The average household size was 2.22 and the average family size was 2.71.

The age distribution was 14.9% under the age of 18, 55.3% from 18 to 64, and 29.8% 65 or older. The median age was 52.5 years.

The median household income was $37,125 and the median family income was $37,188. Males had a median income of $30,114 versus $30,089 for females. The per capita income for the township was $22,988. None of the families and 1.9% of the population were below the poverty line, including none of those under age 18 and 4.3% of those age 65 or over.

=== 2000 ===
At the 2000 census there were 607 people, 214 households, and 161 families in the township. The population density was 15.8 people per square mile (6.1 people/km^{2}). There were 503 housing units at an average density of 13.1 per square mile (5.1/km^{2}). The racial makeup of the township was 96.21% White, 0.99% African American, 1.65% Native American, 0.33% Asian, 0.16% from other races, and 0.66% from two or more races. Hispanic or Latino of any race were 0.66%.

Of the 214 households 27.1% had children under the age of 18 living with them, 66.8% were married couples living together, 5.1% had a female householder with no husband present, and 24.3% were non-families. 20.6% of households were one person and 12.1% were one person aged 65 or older. The average household size was 2.55 and the average family size was 2.91.

The age distribution was 20.9% under the age of 18, 5.4% from 18 to 24, 21.3% from 25 to 44, 27.8% from 45 to 64, and 24.5% 65 or older. The median age was 47 years. For every 100 females, there were 101.7 males. For every 100 females age 18 and over, there were 100.0 males.

The median household income was $35,893 and the median family income was $40,000. Males had a median income of $25,625 versus $19,688 for females. The per capita income for the township was $18,568. About 3.6% of families and 5.8% of the population were below the poverty line, including 9.1% of those under age 18 and 9.3% of those age 65 or over.
