= WYSP =

WYSP may refer to:

- WYSP (FM), a radio station (88.1 FM) licensed to Dushore, Pennsylvania, United States
- WIP-FM, a radio station (94.1 FM) licensed to Philadelphia, Pennsylvania, which held the call sign WYSP until 2011
