= Fox Township, Sullivan County, Pennsylvania =

Township in Pennsylvania, US

Coordinates: 41°29′00″N 76°44′29″W

- Township
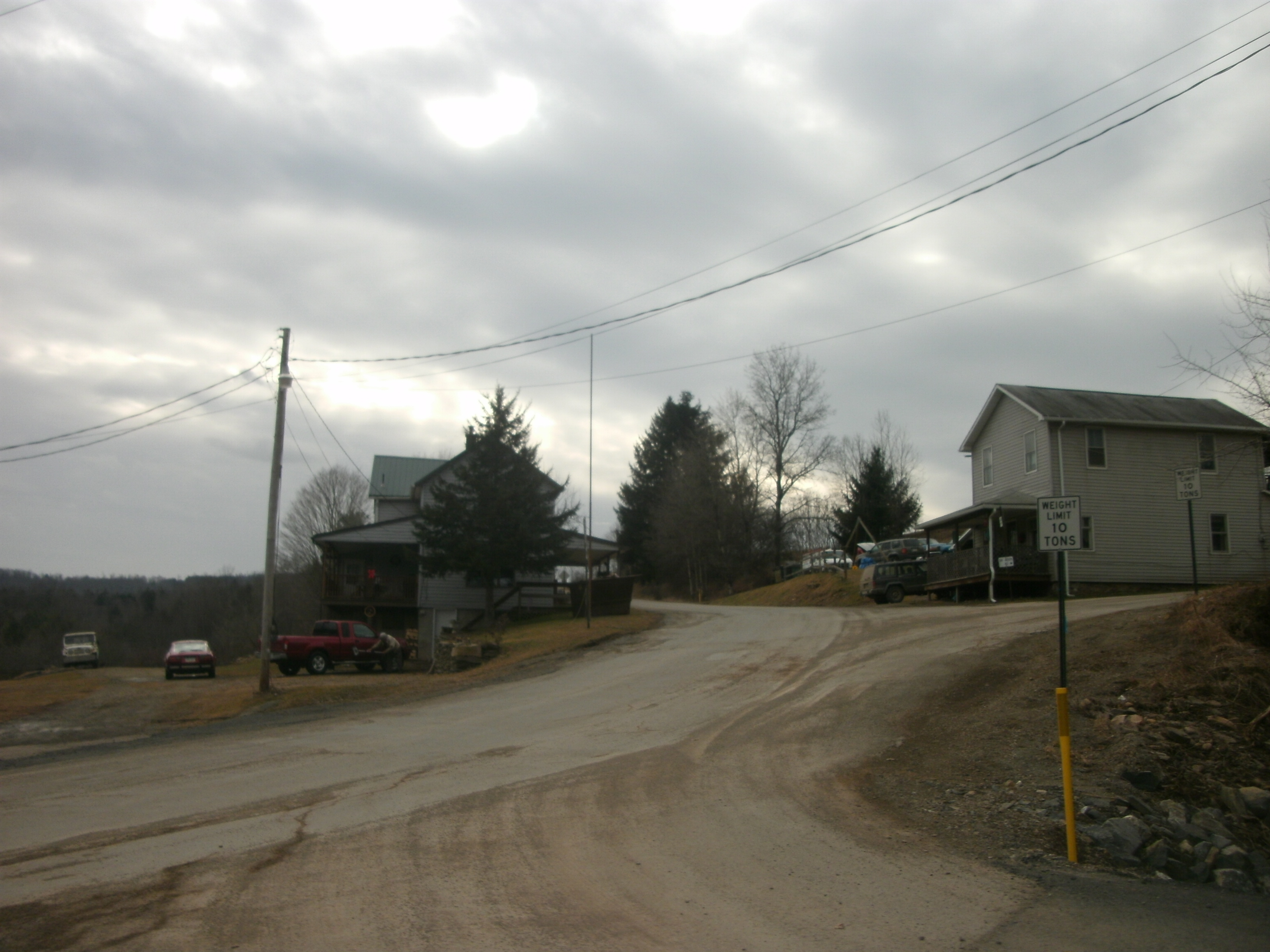
- The community of Shunk, within Fox Township along the side of State Route 154 as seen in February 2012.

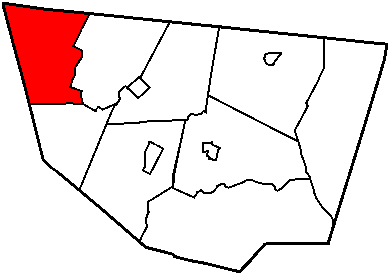
- Map of Sullivan County, Pennsylvania highlighting Fox Township

- Map of Pennsylvania highlighting Sullivan County
- Country: United States
- State: Pennsylvania
- County: Sullivan
- Settled: 1800
- Incorporated: 1839

Area
  - Total: 38.95 sq mi (100.88 km^{2})
  - Land: 38.86 sq mi (100.64 km^{2})
  - Water: 0.093 sq mi (0.24 km^{2})

Population (2020)
  - Total: 310 ▼
  - Estimate (2021): 310
  - Density: 8.7/sq mi (3.34/km^{2})
- Time zone: Eastern (EST)
  - Summer (DST): EDT
- FIPS code: 42-113-27096

Fox Township is a township in Sullivan County, Pennsylvania, United States. The population was 310 at the 2020 census.

== Geography ==
According to the United States Census Bureau, the township has a total area of 38.6 square miles (100 km^{2}), of which 38.5 square miles (100 km^{2}) is land and 0.1 square miles (0.26 km^{2}) (0.28%) is water.

Fox Township is bordered by Bradford County to the north, Elkland Township to the east, Hillsgrove Township to the south and Lycoming County to the west.

== Demographics ==
Historical population
Census	Pop.	Note	%±
2010	358		—
2020	310		−13.4%
2021 (est.)	310		0.0%
U.S. Decennial Census

As of the census of 2000, there were 332 people, 135 households, and 95 families residing in the township. The population density was 8.6 people per square mile (3.3 people/km^{2}). There were 561 housing units at an average density of 14.6 per square mile (5.6/km^{2}). The racial makeup of the township was 99.40% White and 0.60% Asian.

There were 135 households, out of which 23.7% had children under the age of 18 living with them, 60.7% were married couples living together, 5.2% had a female householder with no husband present, and 29.6% were non-families. 22.2% of all households were made up of individuals, and 11.9% had someone living alone who was 65 years of age or older. The average household size was 2.46 and the average family size was 2.87.

In the township the population was spread out, with 18.4% under the age of 18, 8.7% from 18 to 24, 25.9% from 25 to 44, 29.5% from 45 to 64, and 17.5% who were 65 years of age or older. The median age was 43 years. For every 100 females, there were 98.8 males. For every 100 females age 18 and over, there were 100.7 males.

The median income for a household in the township was $26,875, and the median income for a family was $38,125. Males had a median income of $29,583 versus $18,750 for females. The per capita income for the township was $13,971. About 10.0% of families and 16.8% of the population were below the poverty line, including 20.0% of those under age 18 and 15.7% of those age 65 or over.
