= Cherry Township, Sullivan County, Pennsylvania =

Township in Pennsylvania, US

Coordinates: 41°31′00″N 76°21′59″W

- Township
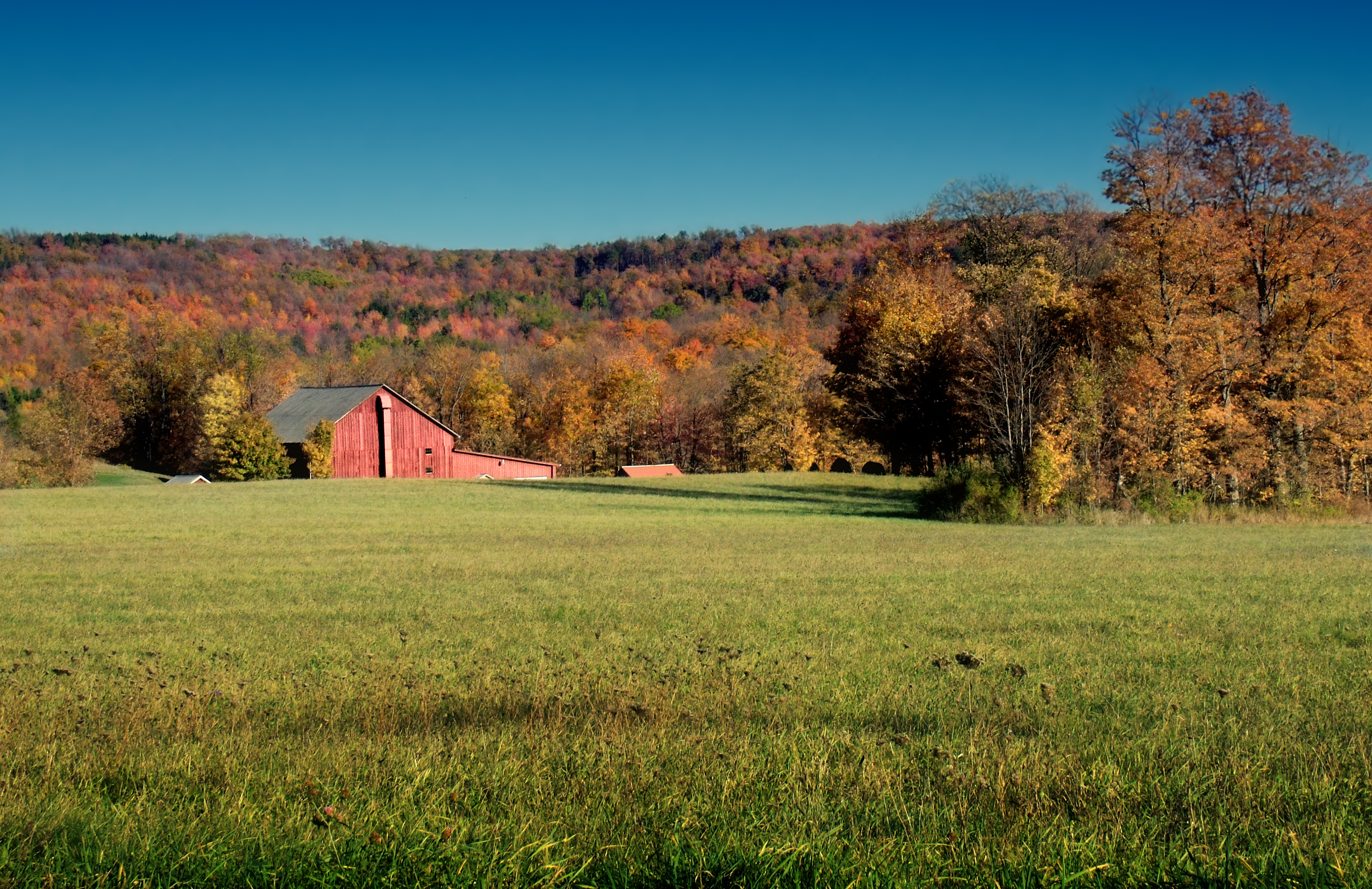
- A farm in the township

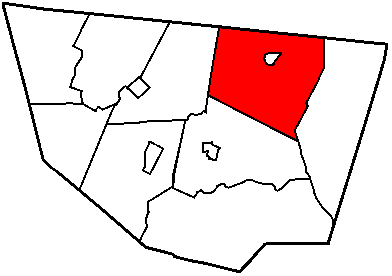
- Map of Sullivan County, Pennsylvania highlighting Cherry Township

- Map of Pennsylvania highlighting Sullivan County
- Country: United States
- State: Pennsylvania
- County: Sullivan
- Settled: 1816
- Incorporated: 1824

Area
  - Total: 58.18 sq mi (150.69 km^{2})
  - Land: 57.96 sq mi (150.12 km^{2})
  - Water: 0.22 sq mi (0.58 km^{2})

Population (2020)
  - Total: 1,475 ▼
  - Estimate (2021): 1,485
  - Density: 28.0/sq mi (10.83/km^{2})
- Time zone: Eastern (EST)
  - Summer (DST): EDT
- FIPS code: 42-113-13000
- Website: cherrytwp.com

Cherry Township is a township in Sullivan County, Pennsylvania, United States. The population was 1,475 at the 2020 census.

== History ==
Cherry Township was first settled in 1816 by Amos Ellis, and a sawmill was built in the township in 1818. Cherry Township was formed from Shewsbury Township in 1824 and named for the nearby Cherry Hill. Cherry Township contained the county seat of Sullivan county from 1848 to 1850, when it was moved to Laporte. A post office was built in Cherry Township in 1878.

== Geography ==
According to the United States Census Bureau, the township has a total area of 57.8 square miles (150 km^{2}), of which 57.6 square miles (149 km^{2}) is land and 0.2 square miles (0.52 km^{2}) (0.35%) is water.

Cherry Township is bordered by Bradford County to the north, Colley Township to the east, Laporte Township to the south and Forks Township to the west.

== Demographics ==
Historical population
Census	Pop.	Note	%±
2010	1,705		—
2020	1,475		−13.5%
2021 (est.)	1,485		0.7%
U.S. Decennial Census

As of the census of 2010 there were 1,705 people, 739 households, and 505 families residing in the township. The population density was 29.6 people per square mile (11.4 people/km^{2}). There were 1,227 housing units at an average density of 21.3 per square mile (8.2/km^{2}). The racial makeup of the township was 98.3% White, 0.2% African American, 0.4% Native American, 0.2% Asian, 0.1% from other races, and 0.9% from two or more races. Hispanic or Latino of any race were 1.5% of the population.

There were 739 households, out of which 23.0% had children under the age of 18 living with them, 55.8% were married couples living together, 7.3% had a female householder with no husband present, and 31.7% were non-families. The average household size was 2.31 and the average family size was 2.76.

In the township the population was spread out, with 18.5% under the age of 18, 6.9% from 18 to 24, 18.9% from 25 to 44, 33.1% from 45 to 64, and 22.6% who were 65 years of age or older. The median age was 48.4 years. For every 100 females, there were 103.9 males.

The median income for a household in the township was $40,143, and the median income for a family was $48,438.
