= List of Pennsylvania state historical markers in Sullivan County =

Location of Sullivan County in Pennsylvania

This is a list of the Pennsylvania state historical markers in Sullivan County.

This is intended to be a complete list of the official state historical markers placed in Sullivan County, Pennsylvania by the Pennsylvania Historical and Museum Commission (PHMC). The locations of the historical markers, as well as the latitude and longitude coordinates as provided by the PHMC's database, are included below when available. There are seven historical markers located in Sullivan County.

== Historical markers ==
Marker title	Image	Date dedicated	Location	Marker type	Topics
Celestia		October 22, 1999	Pa. 42 1½ miles west of Laporte; 41.42221°N 76.52493°W	Roadside	Early Settlement, Religion
Celestia		July 12, 1951	U.S. 220 just NE of Laporte; 41.42454°N 76.48858°W	Roadside	Religion
Harold "Red" Grange		August 25, 1999	Rte. 154 off of Rte 87, Forksville; 41.4911°N 76.60104°W	Roadside	Agriculture, Business & Industry, Football, Sports
Old Woolen Factory		January 12, 1951	Junction Pa. 87 & 154, Forksville; 41.49184°N 76.60112°W	Roadside	Buildings, Business & Industry
Rural Electrification		September 25, 1987	Pa. 87 just SW of Pa. 154, Forksville; 41.48829°N 76.61235°W	Roadside	Business & Industry, Electricity
Sullivan County		August 18, 1982	Courthouse, Main & Muncy Sts., Laporte; 41.42398°N 76.49326°W	City	Government & Politics, Government & Politics 19th Century
Wyalusing Path		January 12, 1951	U.S. 220 at Neech Glen, 1 miles S of Muncy Valley; 41.334°N 76.58798°W	Roadside	Native American, Paths & Trails, Transportation

== See also ==
- List of Pennsylvania state historical markers
- National Register of Historic Places listings in Sullivan County, Pennsylvania
