= Hillsgrove Township, Sullivan County, Pennsylvania =

Township in Pennsylvania, US

Coordinates: 41°26′00″N 76°42′59″W

Hillsgrove Township, Pennsylvania
- Township
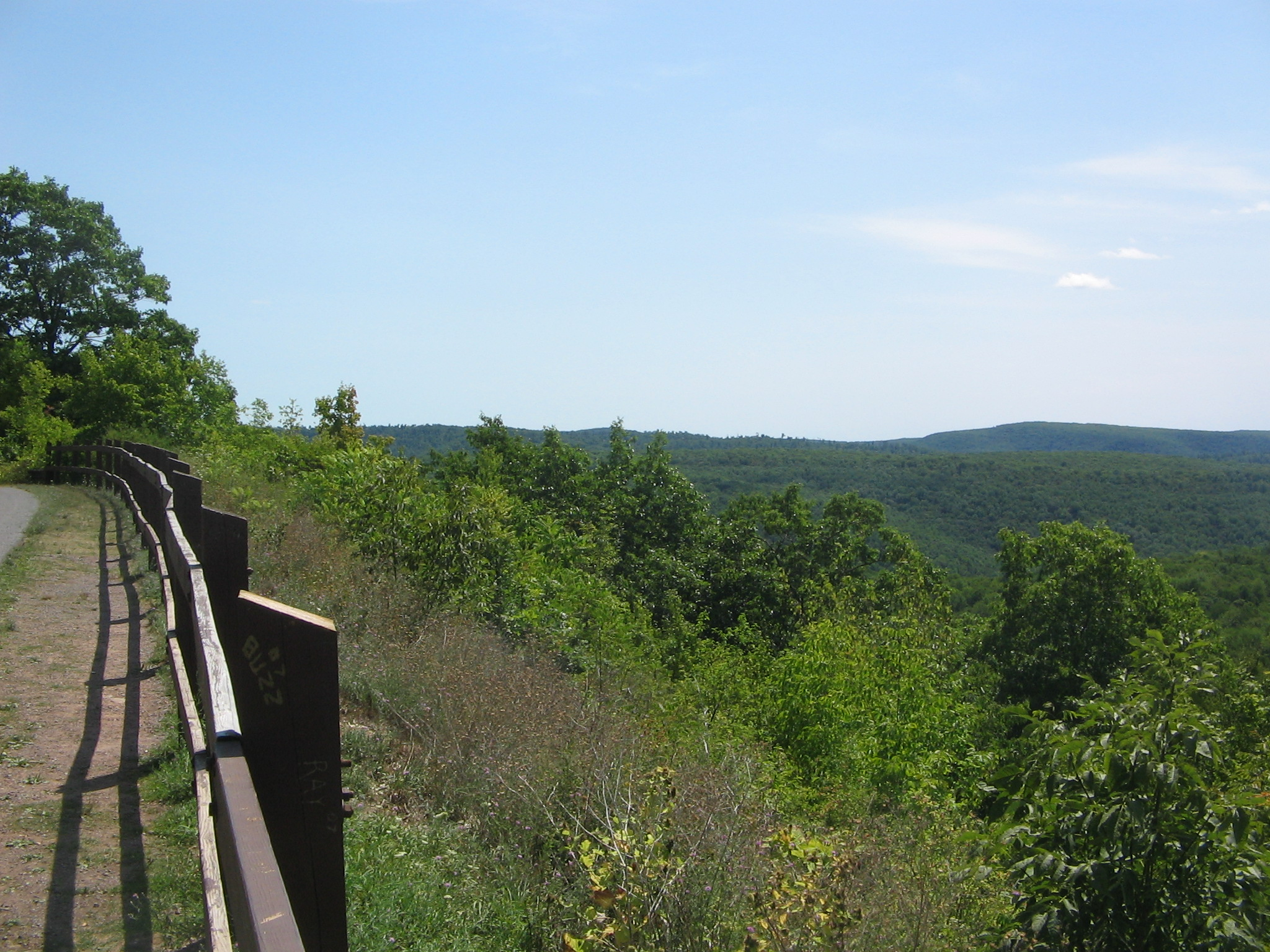
- High Knob vista of Loyalsock State Forest, Hillsgrove Township

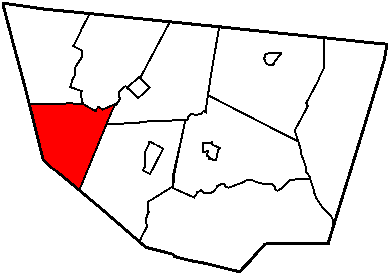
- Map of Sullivan County, Pennsylvania highlighting Hillsgrove Township

- Map of Pennsylvania highlighting Sullivan County
- Country: United States
- State: Pennsylvania
- County: Sullivan
- Settled: 1786
- Incorporated: 1847

Area
  - Total: 28.53 sq mi (73.89 km^{2})
  - Land: 28.51 sq mi (73.84 km^{2})
  - Water: 0.019 sq mi (0.05 km^{2})

Population (2020)
  - Total: 228
  - Estimate (2021): 229
  - Density: 9.7/sq mi (3.74/km^{2})
- Time zone: Eastern (EST)
  - Summer (DST): EDT
- FIPS code: 42-113-34840

Hillsgrove Township is a township in Sullivan County, Pennsylvania, United States. The population was 228 at the 2020 census.

== History ==
The Hillsgrove Covered Bridge was added to the National Register of Historic Places in 1973.

== Geography ==
According to the United States Census Bureau, the township has a total area of 28.4 square miles (74 km^{2}), of which 28.4 square miles (74 km^{2}) is land and 0.04% is water.

Hillsgrove Township is bordered by Fox and Elkland Townships to the north, Forks and Shrewsbury Townships to the east and Lycoming County to the south and west.

The Loyalsock Creek flows through Hillsgrove and other parts of Sullivan County as well.

== Demographics ==
Historical population
Census	Pop.	Note	%±
2010	287		—
2020	228		−20.6%
2021 (est.)	229		0.4%
U.S. Decennial Census

As of the census of 2000, there were 265 people, 113 households, and 70 families residing in the township. The population density was 9.3 people per square mile (3.6/km^{2}). There were 340 housing units at an average density of 12.0/sq mi (4.6/km^{2}). The racial makeup of the township was 98.49% White, 0.38% Asian, and 1.13% from two or more races. Hispanic or Latino of any race were 0.38% of the population.

There were 113 households, out of which 26.5% had children under the age of 18 living with them, 49.6% were married couples living together, 9.7% had a female householder with no husband present, and 37.2% were non-families. 31.9% of all households were made up of individuals, and 13.3% had someone living alone who was 65 years of age or older. The average household size was 2.21 and the average family size was 2.79.

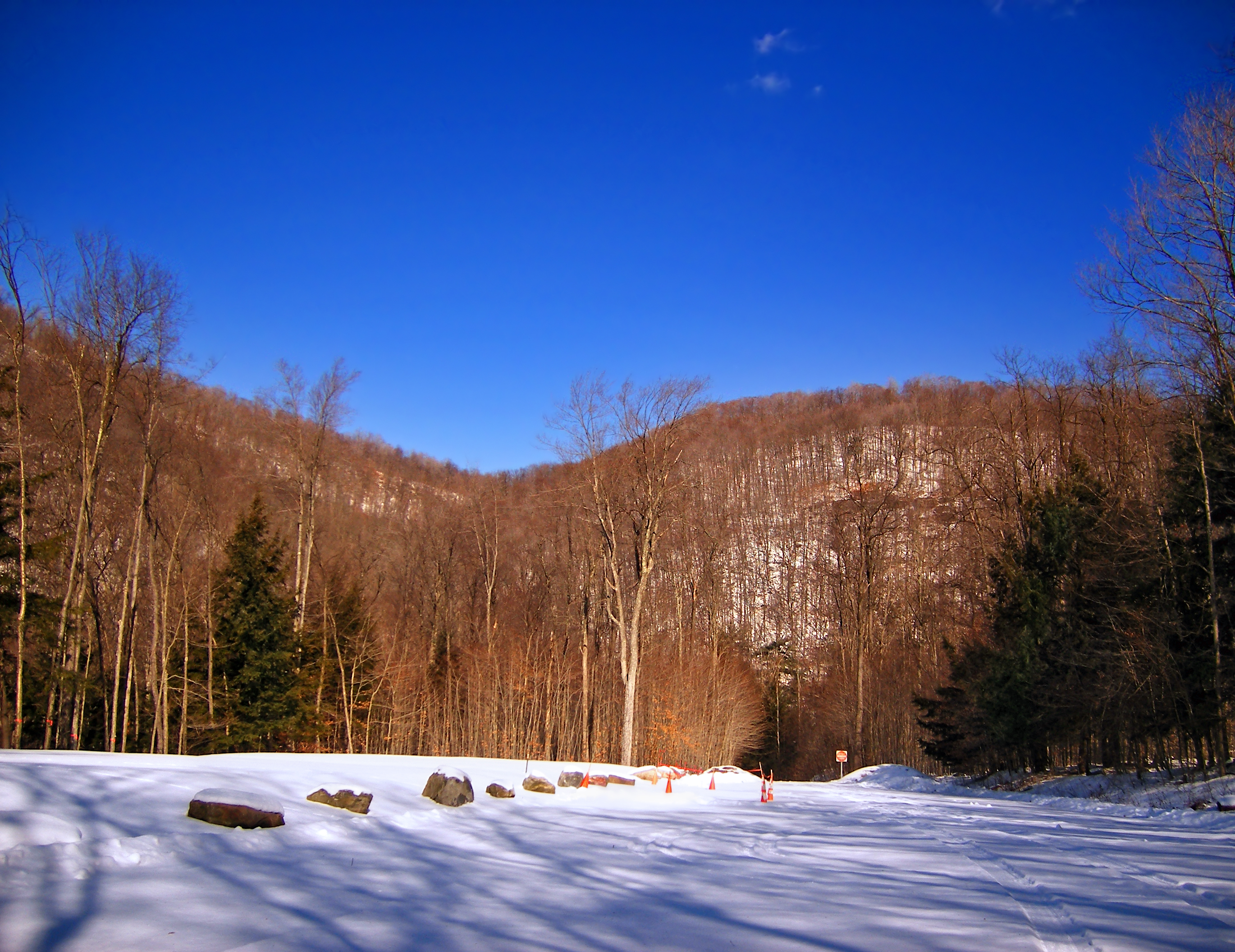
Loyalsock State Forest in Hillsgrove Township

In the township the population was spread out, with 18.9% under the age of 18, 6.0% from 18 to 24, 29.1% from 25 to 44, 26.4% from 45 to 64, and 19.6% who were 65 years of age or older. The median age was 44 years. For every 100 females, there were 94.9 males. For every 100 females age 18 and over, there were 99.1 males.

The median income for a household in the township was $29,375, and the median income for a family was $36,250. Males had a median income of $27,813 versus $21,250 for females. The per capita income for the township was $18,471. About 5.6% of families and 7.5% of the population were below the poverty line, including 2.3% of those under the age of eighteen and 13.0% of those 65 or over.
