= Laporte Township, Pennsylvania =

Township in Pennsylvania, US

Coordinates: 41°22′25″N 76°29′28″W

- Township
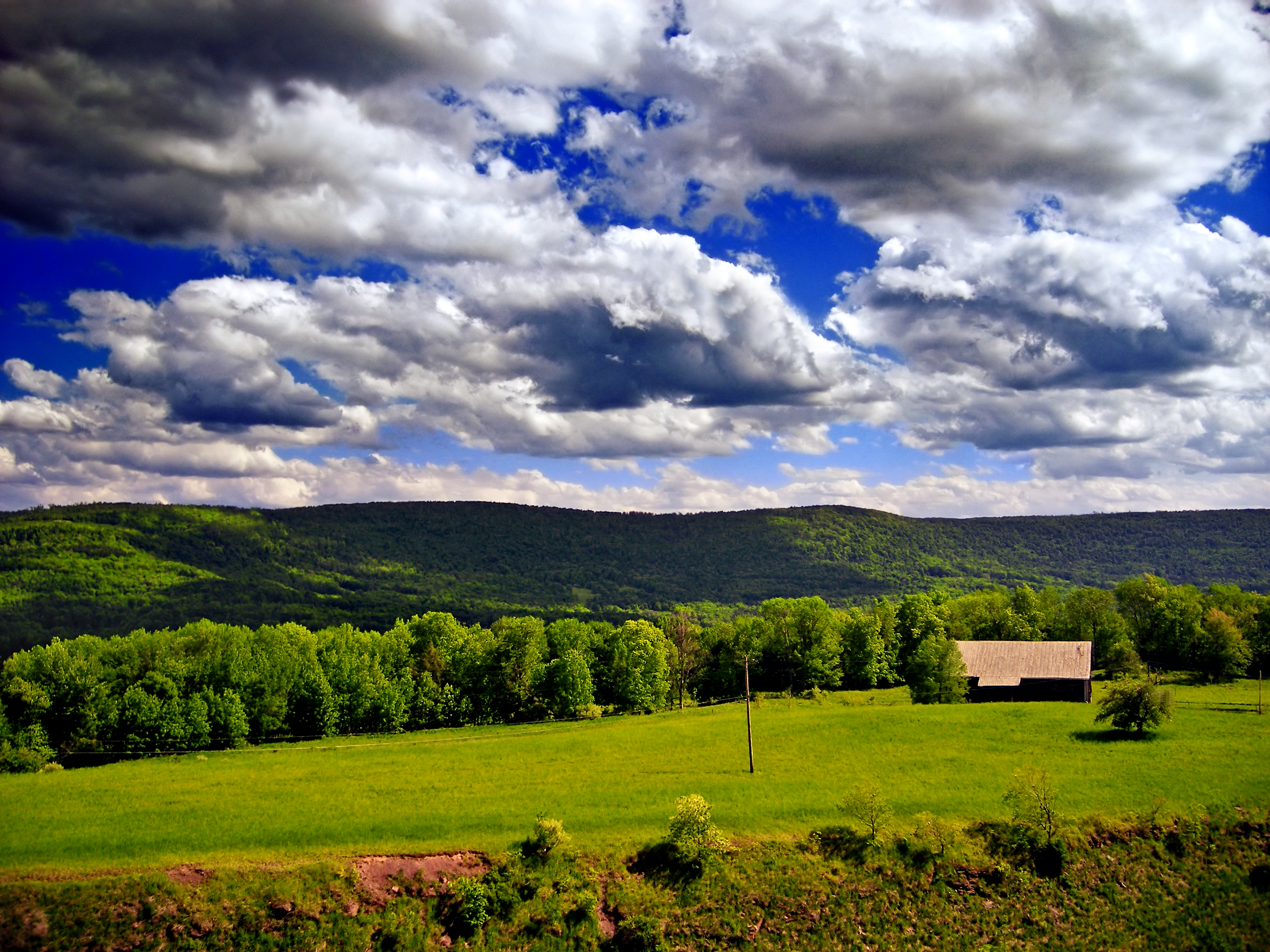
- Laporte Township, Pennsylvania

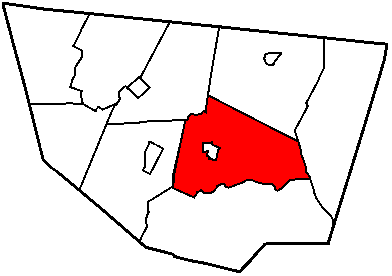
- Map of Sullivan County, Pennsylvania highlighting Laporte Township

- Map of Pennsylvania highlighting Sullivan County
- Country: United States
- State: Pennsylvania
- County: Sullivan
- Settled: 1830
- Incorporated: 1850

Area
  - Total: 54.14 sq mi (140.23 km^{2})
  - Land: 53.98 sq mi (139.80 km^{2})
  - Water: 0.17 sq mi (0.43 km^{2})

Population (2020)
  - Total: 404 ▲
  - Estimate (2021): 407
  - Density: 6.3/sq mi (2.45/km^{2})
- Time zone: Eastern (EST)
  - Summer (DST): EDT
- FIPS code: 42-113-41520
- Website: https://laportetownship.com/

Laporte Township is a township in Sullivan County, Pennsylvania, United States. The population was 404 at the 2020 census. Note that Laporte Township surrounds the borough of Laporte.

== Geography ==
According to the United States Census Bureau, the township has a total area of 53.7 square miles (139 km^{2}), of which 53.5 square miles (139 km^{2}) is land and 0.2 square miles (0.52 km^{2}) (0.34%) is water.

Laporte Township is bordered by Cherry Township to the north, Colley Township to the east, Davidson Township to the south, Shrewsbury Township to the west and Forks Township to the northwest.

== Demographics ==
Historical population
Census	Pop.	Note	%±
2010	349		—
2020	404		15.8%
2021 (est.)	407		0.7%
U.S. Decennial Census

As of the census of 2000, there were 373 people, 152 households, and 115 families residing in the township. The population density was 7.0 people per square mile (2.7 people/km^{2}). There were 453 housing units at an average density of 8.5 per square mile (3.3/km^{2}). The racial makeup of the township was 97.05% White, 2.14% Native American, and 0.80% from two or more races.

There were 152 households, out of which 25.7% had children under the age of 18 living with them, 66.4% were married couples living together, 5.3% had a female householder with no husband present, and 24.3% were non-families. 20.4% of all households were made up of individuals, and 9.9% had someone living alone who was 65 years of age or older. The average household size was 2.45 and the average family size was 2.84.

In the township the population was spread out, with 19.0% under the age of 18, 5.6% from 18 to 24, 24.7% from 25 to 44, 30.3% from 45 to 64, and 20.4% who were 65 years of age or older. The median age was 46 years. For every 100 females, there were 110.7 males. For every 100 females age 18 and over, there were 100.0 males.

The median income for a household in the township was $30,000, and the median income for a family was $36,875. Males had a median income of $33,750 versus $23,125 for females. The per capita income for the township was $16,845. About 13.9% of families and 15.4% of the population were below the poverty line, including 20.8% of those under age 18 and 20.7% of those age 65 or over.
