= Little Loyalsock Creek =

Creek in Pennsylvania, United States

Coordinates: 41.52711°N 76.38640°W

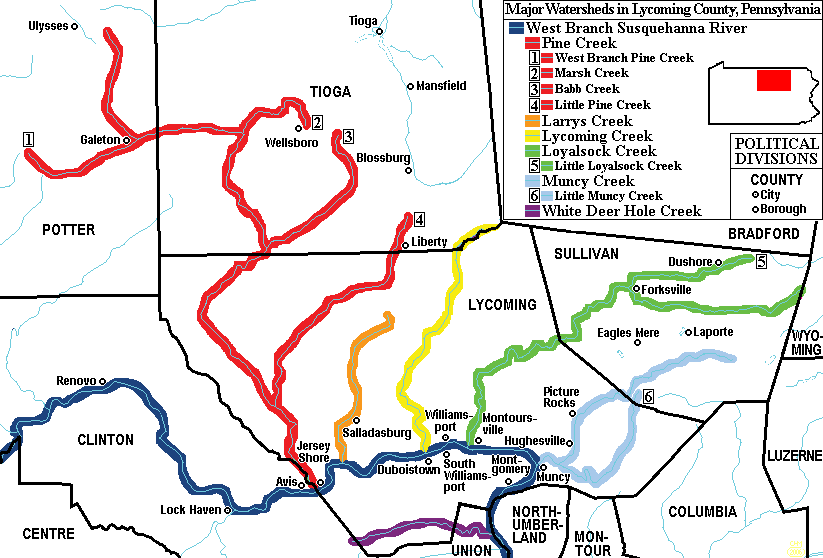
Map of the West Branch Susquehanna River (dark blue) and major streams in Lycoming County, Pennsylvania. Loyalsock Creek (green) is the fourth major creek to enter the river in the county, between Lycoming Creek (yellow) and Muncy Creek (light blue). Little Loyalsock Creek is the shorter branch north of the longer main creek (and is labeled with a '5').

Little Loyalsock Creek is the major tributary of Loyalsock Creek in Lycoming and Sullivan counties, Pennsylvania, United States. The creek is 19.3 miles (31.1 km) long. Via Loyalsock Creek and the West Branch Susquehanna River, it is part of the Susquehanna River drainage basin, and waters from it flow ultimately into the Chesapeake Bay.

== Course ==
Little Loyalsock Creek has its source near the borough of Dushore in Sullivan County, then flows west-southwest to its confluence with Loyalsock Creek in the borough of Forksville.

== See also ==
- List of rivers of Pennsylvania
- List of rivers of the United States
