= Loyalsock Creek =

Coordinates: 41.238°N 76.939°W

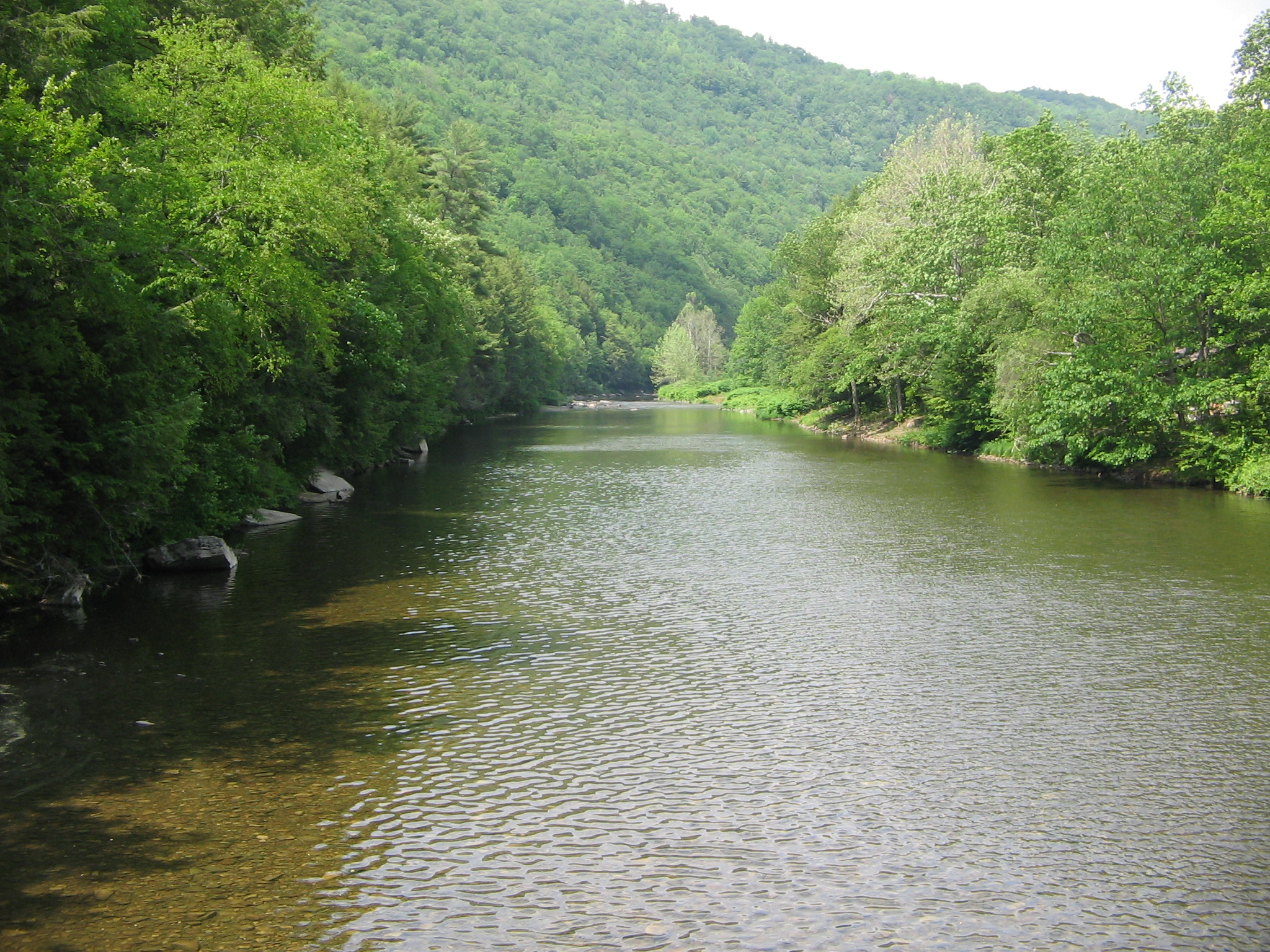
- Loyalsock Creek from the Hillsgrove Covered Bridge

Location
- Country: Pennsylvania, United States

Physical characteristics
- Source
  - location: Western Wyoming County
  - elevation: 2,272 feet (693 m)
- Mouth
  - location: West Branch Susquehanna River, at Montoursville
- Length: 64.3 mi (103.5 km)
- Basin size: 495 mi^{2} (1,280 km^{2})
- Discharge
  - average: 766 cubic feet per second (21.7 m^{3}/s) (for Loyalsockville)

Loyalsock Creek is a 64-mile-long (103 km) tributary of the West Branch Susquehanna River located chiefly in Sullivan and Lycoming counties in Pennsylvania in the United States. As the crow flies, Lycoming County is about 130 miles (209 km) northwest of Philadelphia and 165 miles (266 km) east-northeast of Pittsburgh.

== Name ==
The name is a corruption of a word in the language of the local indigenous peoples meaning "middle creek" (the original was something like Lawi-sahquick). This refers to Loyalsock Creek's location between Lycoming Creek and Muncy Creek, with the mouths of each about 6 miles (10 km) up- and downstream of the mouth of the Loyalsock. Several important trails used by the local indigenous peoples ran along parts of the Loyalsock or crossed it. Two important villages of the local indigenous peoples were located on its banks, one of which, Ots-ton-wak-in, was the home to Madame Montour and her son Andrew Montour, and later became Montoursville.

== Description ==
Loyalsock Creek is 64.3 miles (103.5 km) long. The source is in western Wyoming County near the Sullivan County line, and its confluence with the West Branch Susquehanna River is at Montoursville. The area surrounding the confluence with the Susquehanna River has been flooded numerous times over the past decade, devastating many local homes and businesses.

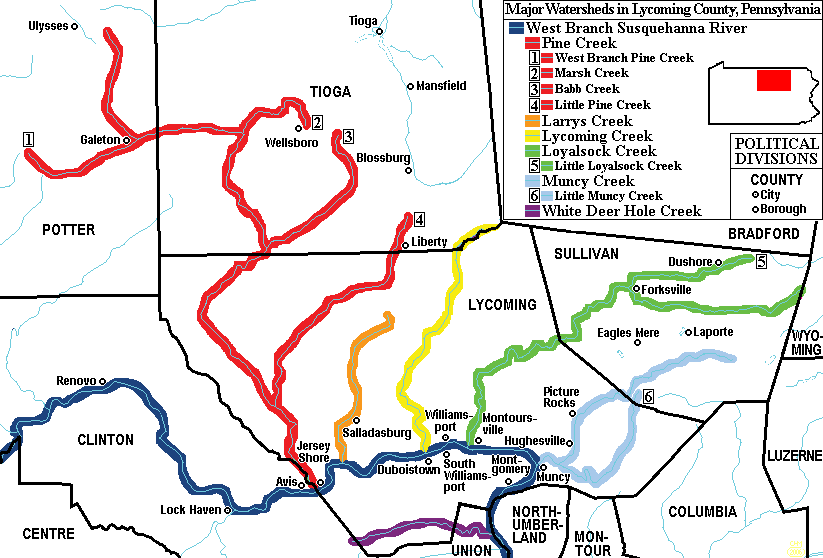
Map of the West Branch Susquehanna River (dark blue) and major streams in Lycoming County, Pennsylvania. Loyalsock Creek (green) is the fourth major creek to enter the river in Lycoming County and is located between the Lycoming Creek (yellow) and Muncy Creek (light blue) watersheds. Its major tributary, Little Loyalsock Creek, is shown north of Loyalsock Creek (in green, number 5). They meet at Forksville in Sullivan County.

Its main tributary is Little Loyalsock Creek, which has its confluence at Forksville in Sullivan County. The names of Forksville and the surrounding Forks Township come from the fork of the creek there.

Pennsylvania receives the most acid rain of any state in the United States. Because Loyalsock Creek is in a sandstone, shale, conglomerate, and coal mountain region, it has a relatively low capacity to neutralize added acid. This makes it especially vulnerable to increased acidification from acid rain, which poses a long-term threat to the health of the plants and animals in the creek.

Loyalsock Creek is used for trout fishing and whitewater kayaking, and the Loyalsock Trail which runs along it is an opportunity for hiking. Worlds End State Park is located on the Loyalsock in Sullivan County, near Forksville. Pennsylvania Route 87 runs the length of the valley, following the north fork after Forksville.

=== Floods ===
The Loyalsock has flooded many times, including major floods in 1866, 1889, 1894 and 1936. The floods of 1972, 1975, 1996 and 2011 each set the record for discharge (flow of water) and stage/gauge (height of the river’s surface). Hurricanes/tropical storms are the primary cause of floods, including Lee (2011), Ivan (2004), Agnes (1972), and Eloise (1975). The second biggest flood in January 1996 was due to high rain and major snow melt.

The record flood of September 8, 2011 was due to a convergence of rare events, which included moisture from three tropical cyclones:

1. The unusually heavy rains during the first four weeks of August.
2. Three to five inches of rain from Hurricane Irene on August 28.
3. The extreme rains far upstream (7+ inches) from remnants of Tropical Storm Lee.
4. The enhanced rainfall on September 7–8 due to a moisture plume from Hurricane Katia.

The Loyalsock valley is deep and narrow, and the 435 square miles of drainage funnel water into the narrow valley, resulting in catastrophic level rise. Six people died in the 1996 and 2011 floods. Millions of dollars in damage was caused by the 1996 and 2011 floods.

== Haystacks ==
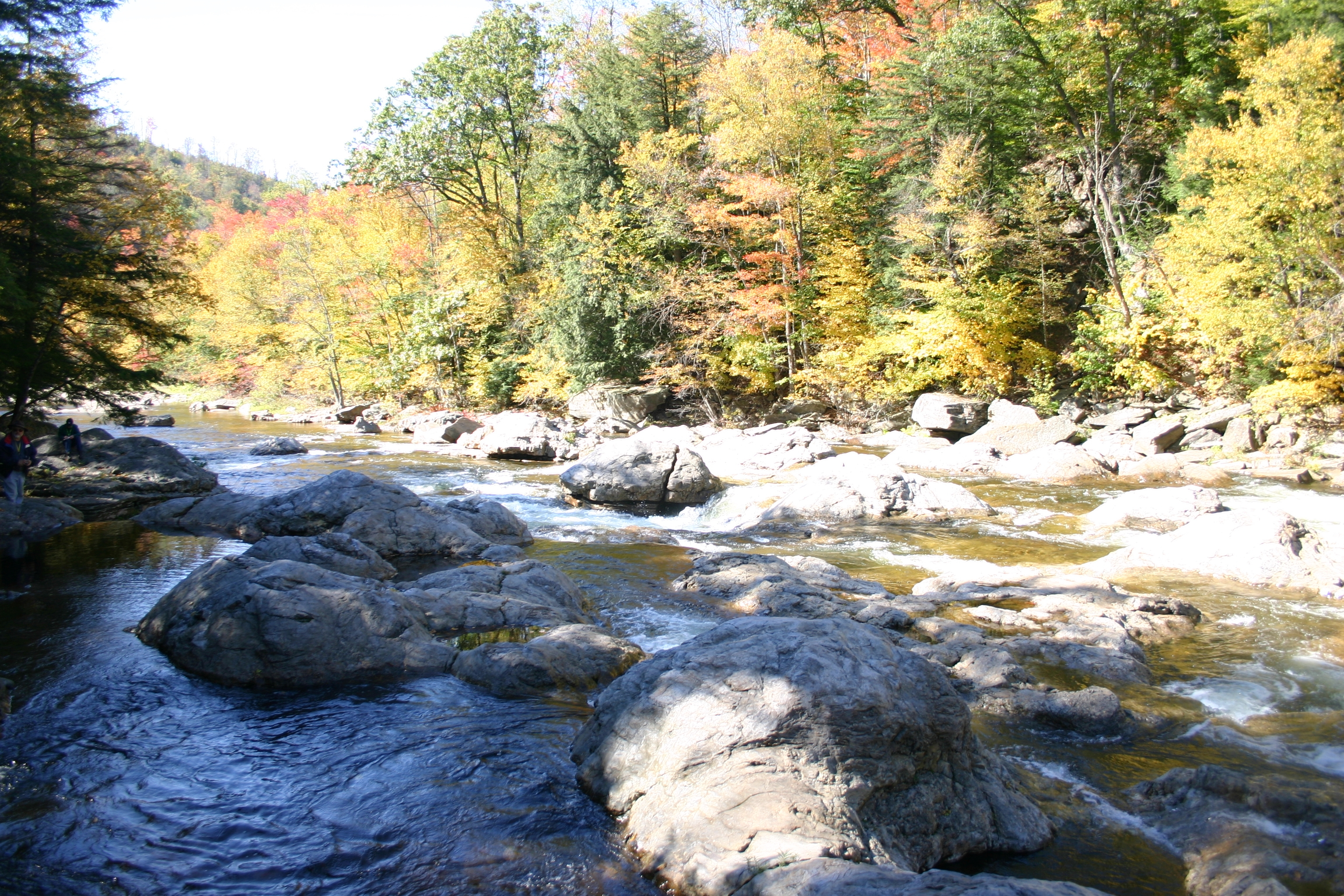
The Haystacks in Loyalsock Creek

The Haystacks are mounds of sandstone that outcrop in Loyalsock Creek south of Dushore in Sullivan County. Geologically, they are a bed of quartz sandstone with an undulating upper surface, and are part of the Mississippian-Devonian Upper Huntley Mountain Formation.

== History ==
=== Village of Otstonwakin ===
Madame Montour's village of Otstonwakin or Ostuagy was a vitally important location during the settlement of what is now Lycoming County. She operated a trading post and supply depot, partly funded by the Pennsylvania Assembly. Her village at the mouth of Loyalsock Creek on the West Branch Susquehanna River, now part of Montoursville, was an important stopping point for the Moravian missionaries who were spreading the gospel throughout the wilderness of Pennsylvania during the 1740s. Count Zinzendorf, a missionary being guided by Conrad Weiser with the permission of Shikellamy, came to Otstonwakin in 1742.

Madame Montour was known to be a friend of the British. She welcomed the white men who were beginning to migrate into the West Branch Susquehanna Valley. She also had a great amount of influence with the various Indian tribes that were feeling the pressure of colonial expansion. Madame Montour remained loyal to the British despite several attempts by the French to bring her over to their side. This was remarkable because the British colonial government sometimes went as long as a year without paying her for her services.

=== Rail transportation ===
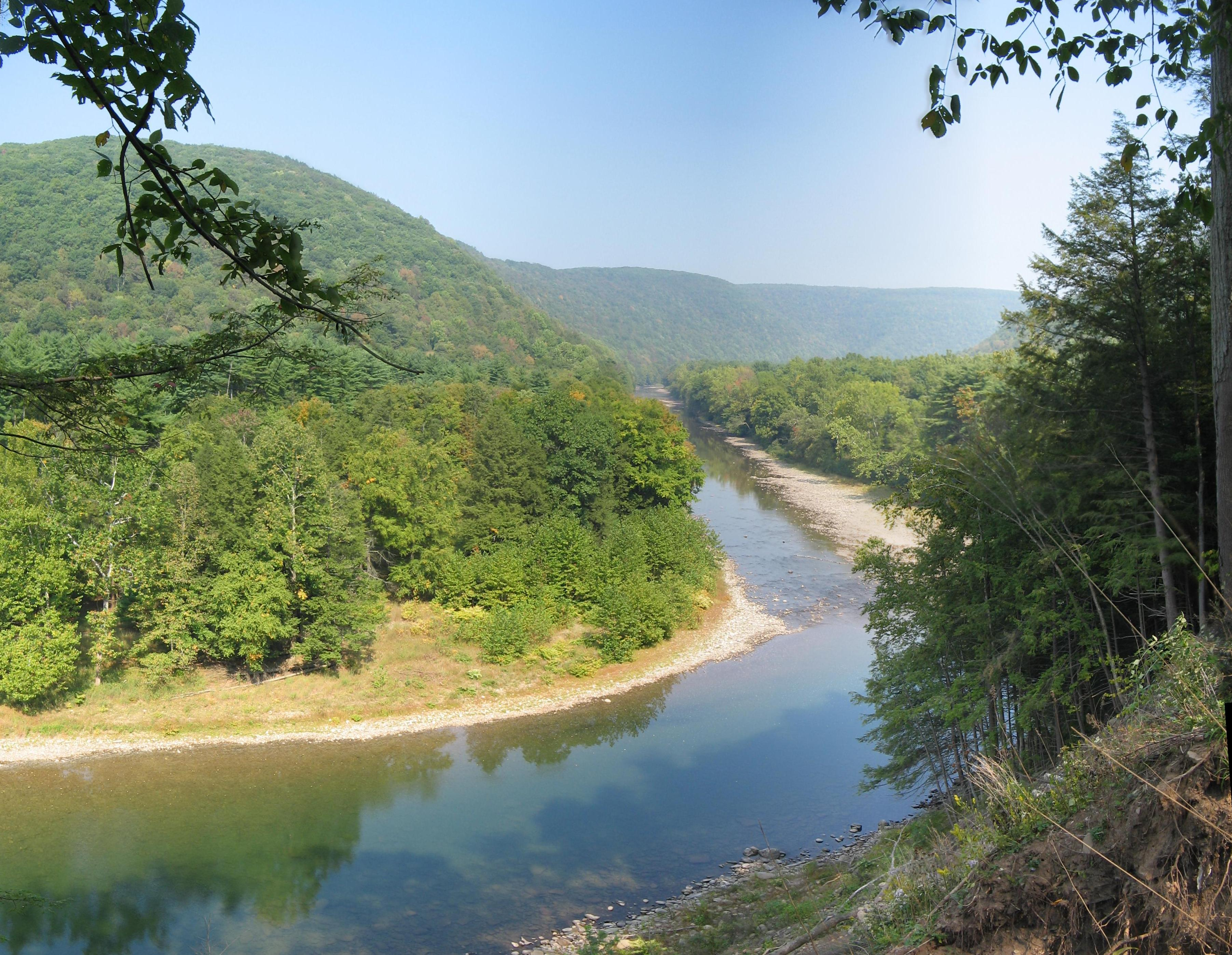
View of Loyalsock Creek in Plunketts Creek Township in Lycoming County

Although lumbering was an important industry in the Loyalsock Creek watershed, railroads took little advantage of the creek valley below Forksville. One exception was the Susquehanna and Eagles Mere Railroad, which built down into Hillsgrove and along the creek as far as Ogdonia in 1902, before turning up Kettle Creek. It was removed in 1922. Above Forksville, the Williamsport and North Branch Railroad followed Mill Creek to reach the Loyalsock and followed it to a crossing at Ringdale. The line was built in 1893 and removed in 1938. About six miles (10 km) to the east, the town of Lopez is the largest settlement on the upper creek. Jennings Brothers Lumber Co. built a narrow-gauge logging line in the area in 1890, and another in 1891 up the creek into Wyoming County, to supply their sawmill at Lopez. In 1892, the Loyalsock Railroad crossed the creek here, building south to bring coal from the Bernice area southward to Harvey's Lake. It was promptly leased to the Lehigh Valley Railroad and became part of the Bowmans Creek Branch. At the same time, the Loyalsock Railroad also built a branch along the Loyalsock downstream from Lopez to Ellis Creek, where it turned south to reach a tannery at Thorndale. This branch was removed in 1898. However, Jennings Bros. continued to operate, standard-gauging their rail line about 1900 and building up the Loyalsock as far as Shumans Lake, where their line headed up Cold Run towards High Cobble and the Dutch Mountain area. The logging railroad was finally removed in 1905 when Jennings Bros. relocated to Maryland, but was partly resurrected in 1911. Stony Brook Lumber Co. used the old grade as far as Santee Run, then turned north towards Crane Swamp. This line was removed in 1916. Traffic gradually dwindled on the Lehigh Valley; their line south of Lopez was abandoned in 1939, and it was cut back to Bernice in 1944. Abandonment of the line to Lopez marked the end of rail traffic on the Loyalsock, except for the Reading Railroad crossing near its mouth at Montoursville. The bridge there is now owned by the Lycoming Valley Railroad. The original Reading bridge was destroyed by flooding from Tropical Storm Lee in 2011 and removed. Its replacement was opened for service on August 13, 2014.

== See also ==
- List of rivers of Pennsylvania
