= Shrewsbury Township, Sullivan County, Pennsylvania =

Township in Pennsylvania, US

Coordinates: 41°24′00″N 76°37′59″W

- Township
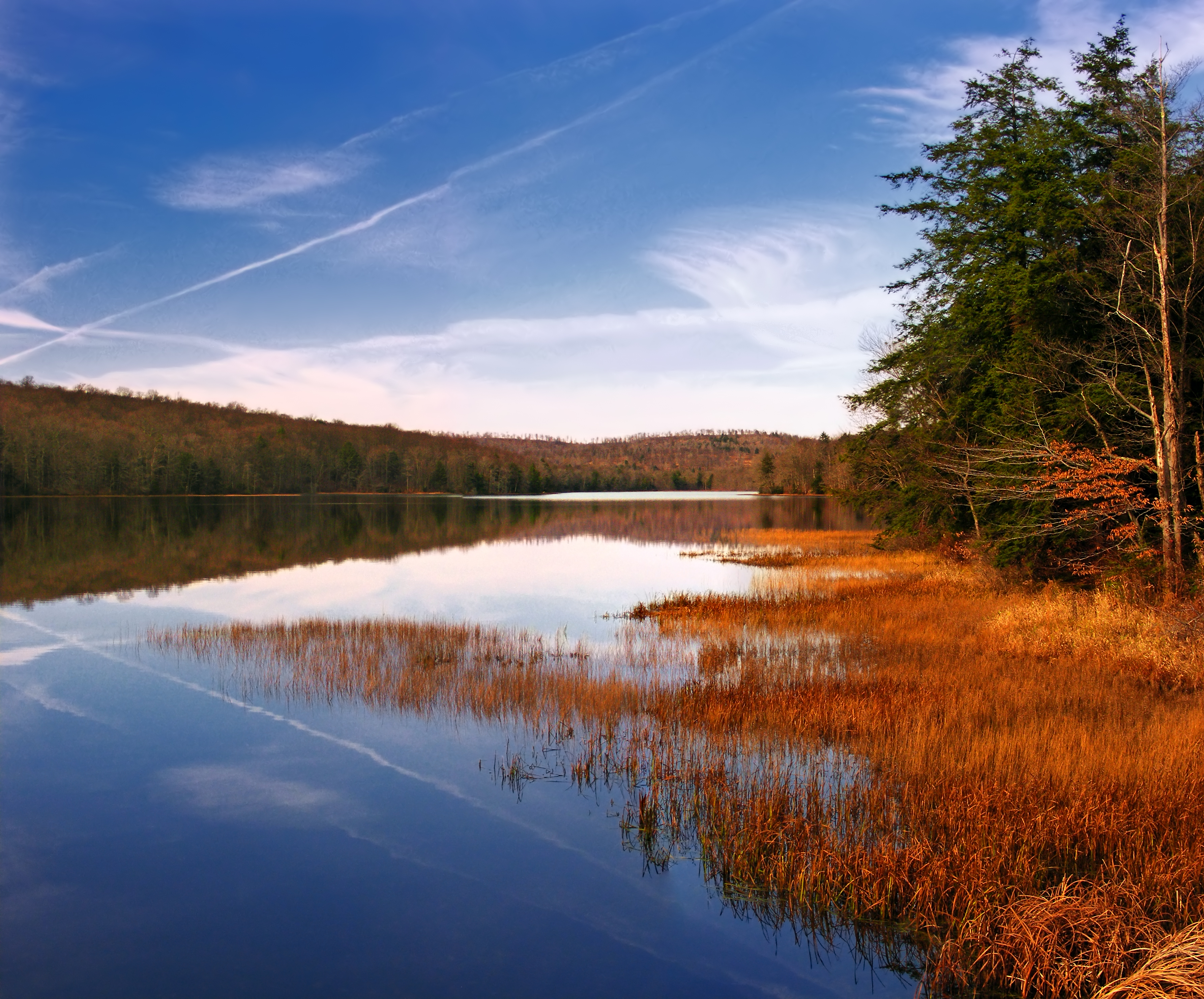
- Hunters Lake

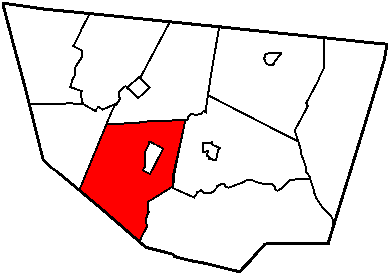
- Map of Sullivan County, Pennsylvania highlighting Shrewsbury Township

- Map of Pennsylvania highlighting Sullivan County
- Country: United States
- State: Pennsylvania
- County: Sullivan
- Settled: 1799
- Incorporated: 1803

Area
  - Total: 47.58 sq mi (123.23 km^{2})
  - Land: 47.16 sq mi (122.14 km^{2})
  - Water: 0.42 sq mi (1.09 km^{2})

Population (2020)
  - Total: 303 ▼
  - Estimate (2021): 304
  - Density: 6.5/sq mi (2.51/km^{2})
- Time zone: Eastern (EST)
  - Summer (DST): EDT
- FIPS code: 42-113-70560

Shrewsbury Township is a township in Sullivan County, Pennsylvania, United States. The population was 303 at the 2020 census.

== History ==
The Eagles Mere Historic District was added to the National Register of Historic Places in 1996.

== Geography ==
According to the United States Census Bureau, the township has a total area of 48.1 square miles (125 km^{2}), of which 47.8 square miles (124 km^{2}) is land and 0.3 square miles (0.78 km^{2}) (0.54%) is water.

A small section of Worlds End State Park, a Pennsylvania state park is in a gorge along Loyalsock Creek in Shrewsbury Township.

Shrewsbury Township is bordered by Forks Township to the north, Laporte Township to the east, Lycoming County to the southwest and Hillsgrove Township to the west.

Shrewsbury Township surrounds the borough of Eagles Mere.

== Demographics ==
Historical population
Census	Pop.	Note	%±
2010	319		—
2020	303		−5.0%
2021 (est.)	304		0.3%
U.S. Decennial Census

As of the census of 2000, there were 328 people, 134 households, and 103 families residing in the township. The population density was 6.9 people per square mile (2.7 people/km^{2}). There were 293 housing units at an average density of 6.1 per square mile (2.4/km^{2}). The racial makeup of the township was 98.78% White, and 1.22% from two or more races.

There were 134 households, out of which 22.4% had children under the age of 18 living with them, 66.4% were married couples living together, 7.5% had a female householder with no husband present, and 22.4% were non-families. 19.4% of all households were made up of individuals, and 6.0% had someone living alone who was 65 years of age or older. The average household size was 2.45 and the average family size was 2.70.

In the township the population was spread out, with 18.0% under the age of 18, 7.6% from 18 to 24, 26.8% from 25 to 44, 28.7% from 45 to 64, and 18.9% who were 65 years of age or older. The median age was 43 years. For every 100 females, there were 101.2 males. For every 100 females age 18 and over, there were 103.8 males.

The median income for a household in the township was $31,750, and the median income for a family was $40,625. Males had a median income of $22,917 versus $24,250 for females. The per capita income for the township was $18,640. About 1.1% of families and 7.5% of the population were below the poverty line, including 14.6% of those under age 18 and 6.7% of those age 65 or over.
