= Forks Township, Sullivan County, Pennsylvania =

Township in Pennsylvania, US

Coordinates: 41°27′30″N 76°37′35″W

- Township
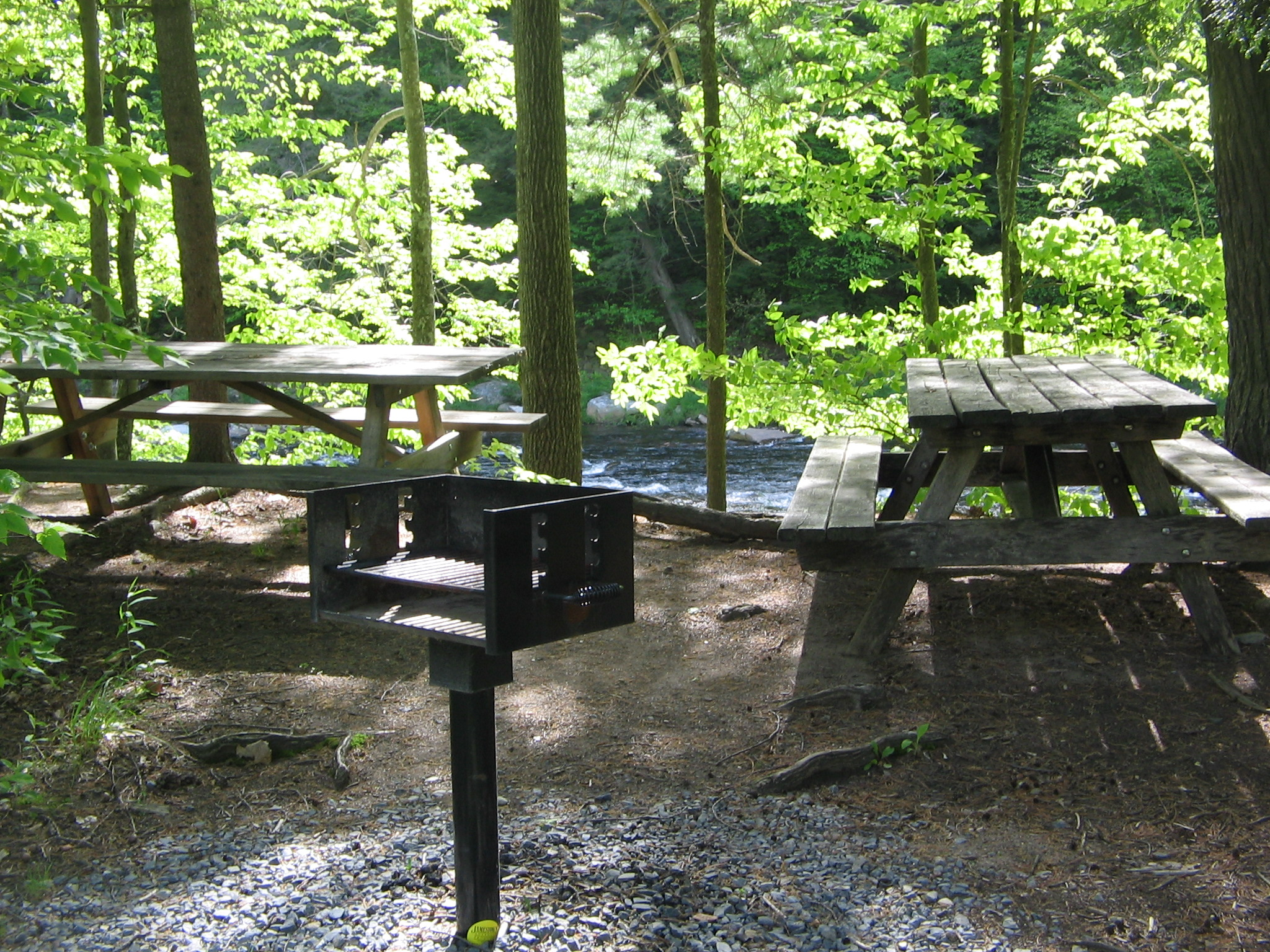
- Worlds End State Park picnic area

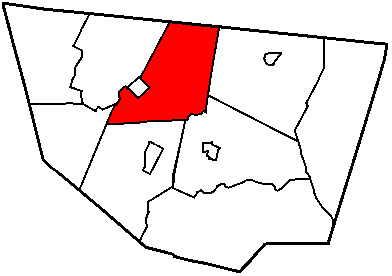
- Map of Sullivan County, Pennsylvania highlighting Forks Township

- Map of Pennsylvania highlighting Sullivan County
- Country: United States
- State: Pennsylvania
- County: Sullivan
- Settled: 1794
- Incorporated: 1833

Area
  - Total: 43.43 sq mi (112.49 km^{2})
  - Land: 43.41 sq mi (112.43 km^{2})
  - Water: 0.019 sq mi (0.05 km^{2})

Population (2020)
  - Total: 372 ▼
  - Estimate (2021): 374
  - Density: 8.3/sq mi (3.22/km^{2})
- Time zone: Eastern (EST)
  - Summer (DST): EDT
- FIPS code: 42-113-26736

Forks Township is a township in Sullivan County, Pennsylvania, United States. The population was 372 at the 2020 census.

== History ==
The Worlds End State Park Family Cabin District was added to the National Register of Historic Places in 1987.

== Geography ==
According to the United States Census Bureau, the township has a total area of 43.9 square miles (114 km^{2}), of which 43.9 square miles (114 km^{2}) is land and 0.04 square miles (0.10 km^{2}) (0.05%) is water.

Part of Worlds End State Park, a Pennsylvania state park, are in a gorge along Loyalsock Creek in Forks Township.

Forks Township is bordered by Bradford County to the north, Cherry Township to the east, Laporte Township to the southeast, Shrewsbury Township to the south and Hillsgrove and Elkland Townships to the west.

Forks Township forms the northern, eastern and southern borders of the borough of Forksville.

== Demographics ==
Historical population
Census	Pop.	Note	%±
2010	377		—
2020	372		−1.3%
2021 (est.)	372		0.0%
U.S. Decennial Census

As of the census of 2000, there were 407 people, 171 households, and 122 families residing in the township. The population density was 9.3 people per square mile (3.6/km^{2}). There were 401 housing units at an average density of 9.1/sq mi (3.5/km^{2}). The racial makeup of the township was 99.51% White, 0.25% Asian, and 0.25% from two or more races.

There were 171 households, out of which 24.0% had children under the age of 18 living with them, 58.5% were married couples living together, 7.6% had a female householder with no husband present, and 28.1% were non-families. 22.2% of all households were made up of individuals, and 11.7% had someone living alone who was 65 years of age or older. The average household size was 2.38 and the average family size was 2.72.

In the township the population was spread out, with 19.9% under the age of 18, 6.1% from 18 to 24, 22.9% from 25 to 44, 28.5% from 45 to 64, and 22.6% who were 65 years of age or older. The median age was 45 years. For every 100 females, there were 103.5 males. For every 100 females age 18 and over, there were 106.3 males.

The median income for a household in the township was $27,969, and the median income for a family was $28,333. Males had a median income of $25,000 versus $23,750 for females. The per capita income for the township was $15,451. About 6.8% of families and 10.0% of the population were below the poverty line, including none of those under age 18 and 19.6% of those age 65 or over.
