= Dushore, Pennsylvania =

Borough in Pennsylvania, US

- Borough
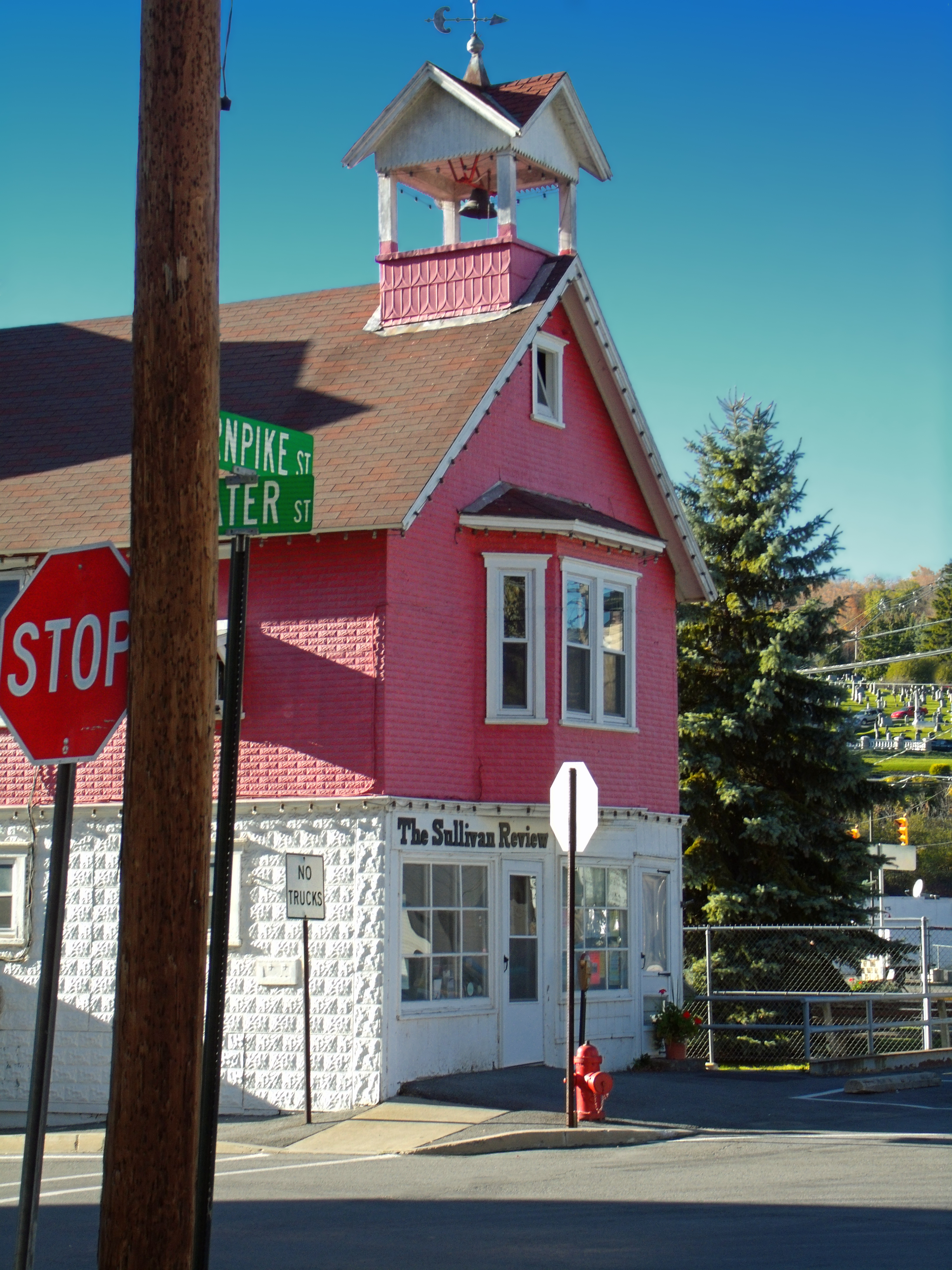
- The Sullivan Review building

- Location of Dushore in Sullivan County, Pennsylvania.

- Location within the U.S. state of Pennsylvania Dushore (the United States)
- Coordinates: 41°31′40″N 76°24′02″W
- Country: United States
- State: Pennsylvania
- County: Sullivan
- Settled: 1794
- Incorporated (borough): 1859

Area
  - Total: 0.80 sq mi (2.08 km^{2})
  - Land: 0.79 sq mi (2.04 km^{2})
  - Water: 0.015 sq mi (0.04 km^{2})
- Elevation: 1,450 ft (440 m)

Population (2020)
  - Total: 451
  - Density: 572.2/sq mi (220.93/km^{2})
- Time zone: Eastern (EST)
  - Summer (DST): EDT
- Zip code: 18614
- Area code: 570
- FIPS code: 42-20528
- Website: Borough of Dushore, PA

Dushore is a borough in Sullivan County, Pennsylvania, United States. The population was 450 at the 2020 census. Dushore is home to Sullivan County's only traffic light.

== History ==
The first permanent settler in the Dushore area was General Cornwallace Jackson, who settled there in 1825. The community itself, however, was founded by and named by the French navy captain Aristide Aubert Dupetit-Thouars. Dushore was incorporated from Cherry Township in 1859. Until the incorporation Dushore was known as Jackson's Hollow, Mosier's Hollow and Headleyville. Dushore has always been known as the center of commerce, business and industry in Sullivan County.

== Geography ==
Dushore is located at 41°31′31″N 76°24′0″W (41.525227, -76.399924).

According to the United States Census Bureau, the borough has a total area of 0.8-square-mile (2.1 km^{2}), of which 0.78-square-mile (2.0 km^{2}) is land and 1.28% is water.

=== Climate ===
Climate data for Dushore, Pennsylvania (1991–2020)
Month	Jan	Feb	Mar	Apr	May	Jun	Jul	Aug	Sep	Oct	Nov	Dec	Year
Mean daily maximum °F (°C)	32.3 (0.2)	35.4 (1.9)	43.4 (6.3)	56.4 (13.6)	67.5 (19.7)	75.5 (24.2)	79.5 (26.4)	77.8 (25.4)	71.1 (21.7)	59.7 (15.4)	47.4 (8.6)	37.6 (3.1)	57.0 (13.9)
Daily mean °F (°C)	23.5 (−4.7)	25.4 (−3.7)	32.6 (0.3)	44.3 (6.8)	55.1 (12.8)	63.9 (17.7)	67.9 (19.9)	66.2 (19.0)	59.1 (15.1)	48.2 (9.0)	38.3 (3.5)	29.2 (−1.6)	46.1 (7.8)
Mean daily minimum °F (°C)	14.7 (−9.6)	15.5 (−9.2)	21.8 (−5.7)	32.2 (0.1)	42.6 (5.9)	52.3 (11.3)	56.2 (13.4)	54.6 (12.6)	47.2 (8.4)	36.7 (2.6)	29.1 (−1.6)	20.9 (−6.2)	35.3 (1.8)
Average precipitation inches (mm)	3.08 (78)	2.25 (57)	3.13 (80)	3.95 (100)	4.10 (104)	3.97 (101)	4.52 (115)	4.50 (114)	4.13 (105)	3.81 (97)	2.91 (74)	3.08 (78)	43.43 (1,103)
Average snowfall inches (cm)	10.6 (27)	10.6 (27)	6.9 (18)	2.0 (5.1)	0.1 (0.25)	0.0 (0.0)	0.0 (0.0)	0.0 (0.0)	0.0 (0.0)	0.7 (1.8)	2.5 (6.4)	8.0 (20)	41.4 (105.55)
Source: NOAA

== Demographics ==
Historical population
Census	Pop.	Note	%±
1860	265		—
1870	376		41.9%
1880	377		0.3%
1890	783		107.7%
1900	884		12.9%
1910	813		−8.0%
1920	776		−4.6%
1930	715		−7.9%
1940	739		3.4%
1950	759		2.7%
1960	731		−3.7%
1970	718		−1.8%
1980	692		−3.6%
1990	738		6.6%
2000	663		−10.2%
2010	608		−8.3%
2020	451		−25.8%
2021 (est.)	452	▲	0.2%

As of the census of 2010, there were 608 people, 341 households, and 134 families residing in the borough. The population density was 779.5 inhabitants per square mile (301.0/km^{2}). There were 408 housing units at an average density of 523.1 per square mile (202.0/km^{2}). The racial makeup of the borough was 98.8% White, 0.3% Native American, 0.2% some other race, and 0.7% from two or more races. Hispanic or Latino of any race were 0.5% of the population.

There were 341 households, out of which 15.8% had children under the age of 18 living with them, 25.8% were married couples living together, 9.7% had a female householder with no husband present, and 60.7% were non-families. 54.5% of all households were made up of individuals, and 24.6% had someone living alone who was 65 years of age or older. The average household size was 1.78 and the average family size was 2.71.

In the borough the population was spread out, with 15.1% under the age of 18, 60.7% from 18 to 64, and 24.2% who were 65 years of age or older. The median age was 49.2 years.

The median income for a household in the borough was $26,635, and the median income for a family was $41,563. Males had a median income of $31,042 versus $21,125 for females. The per capita income for the borough was $17,448. About 9.0% of families and 14.4% of the population were below the poverty line, including 12.1% of those under age 18 and 17.1% of those age 65 or over.

- First settler was Aristide du Petit Thouars, in 1794; In 1960, the now, Dushore Community Park, was named Du Thouars Park. It was rededicated in the early 1990s and renamed.
- Hometown of NASCAR and ARCA driver L. W. Miller.

== Media ==
Dushore is home to four radio stations. WGMF-FM, 103.9 FM and WYSP, 88.1 FM are licensed to Dushore. WPAL, 91.7 FM and WCIS-FM (yet to sign on air) are licensed to nearby Laporte but are located on a tower near Dushore.

The Sullivan Review, a weekly newspaper, has been published in Dushore since 1878.
