= Forksville, Pennsylvania =

Borough in Pennsylvania, US

- Borough
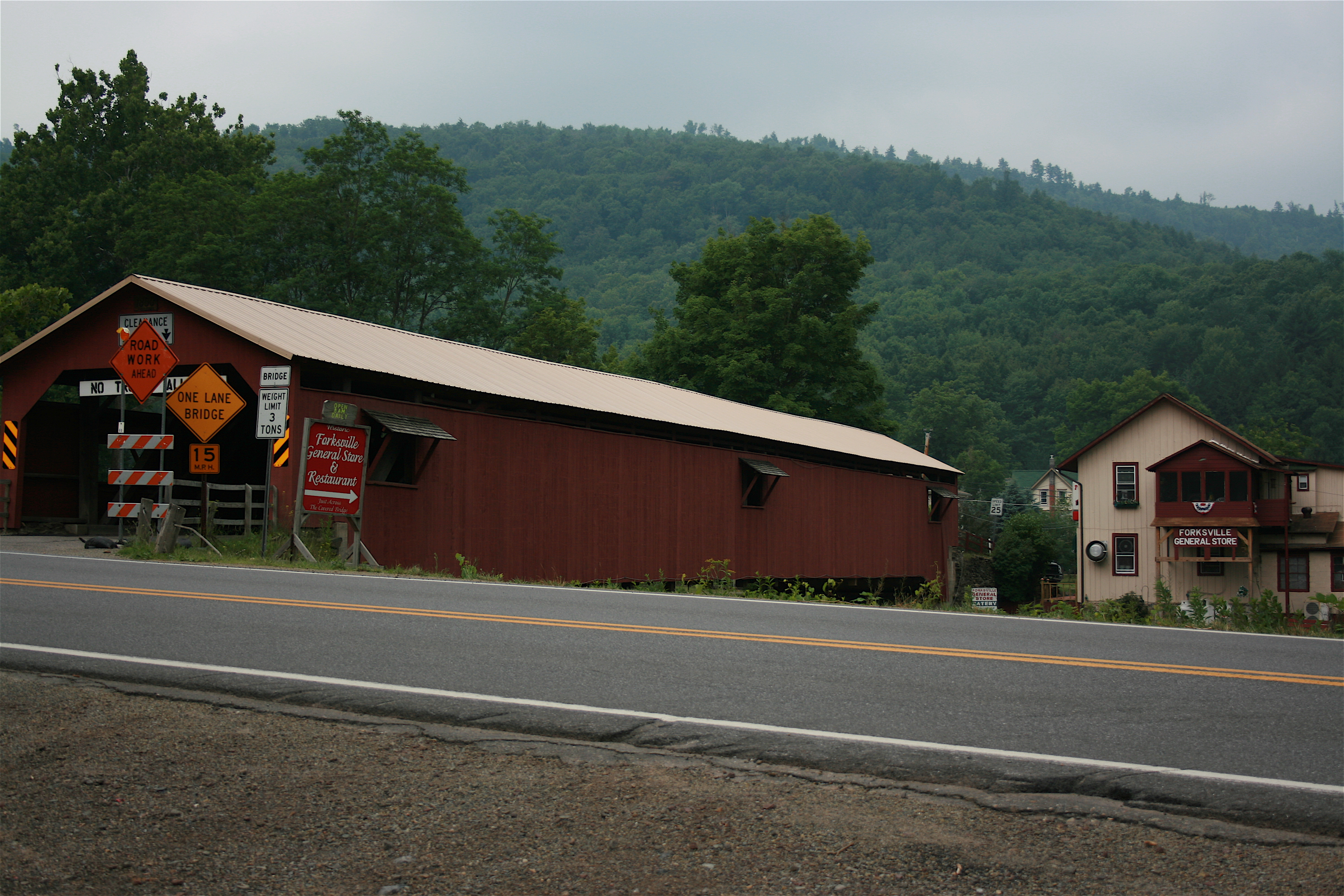
- Forksville Covered Bridge, built 1850, over Loyalsock Creek with the Forksville General Store behind

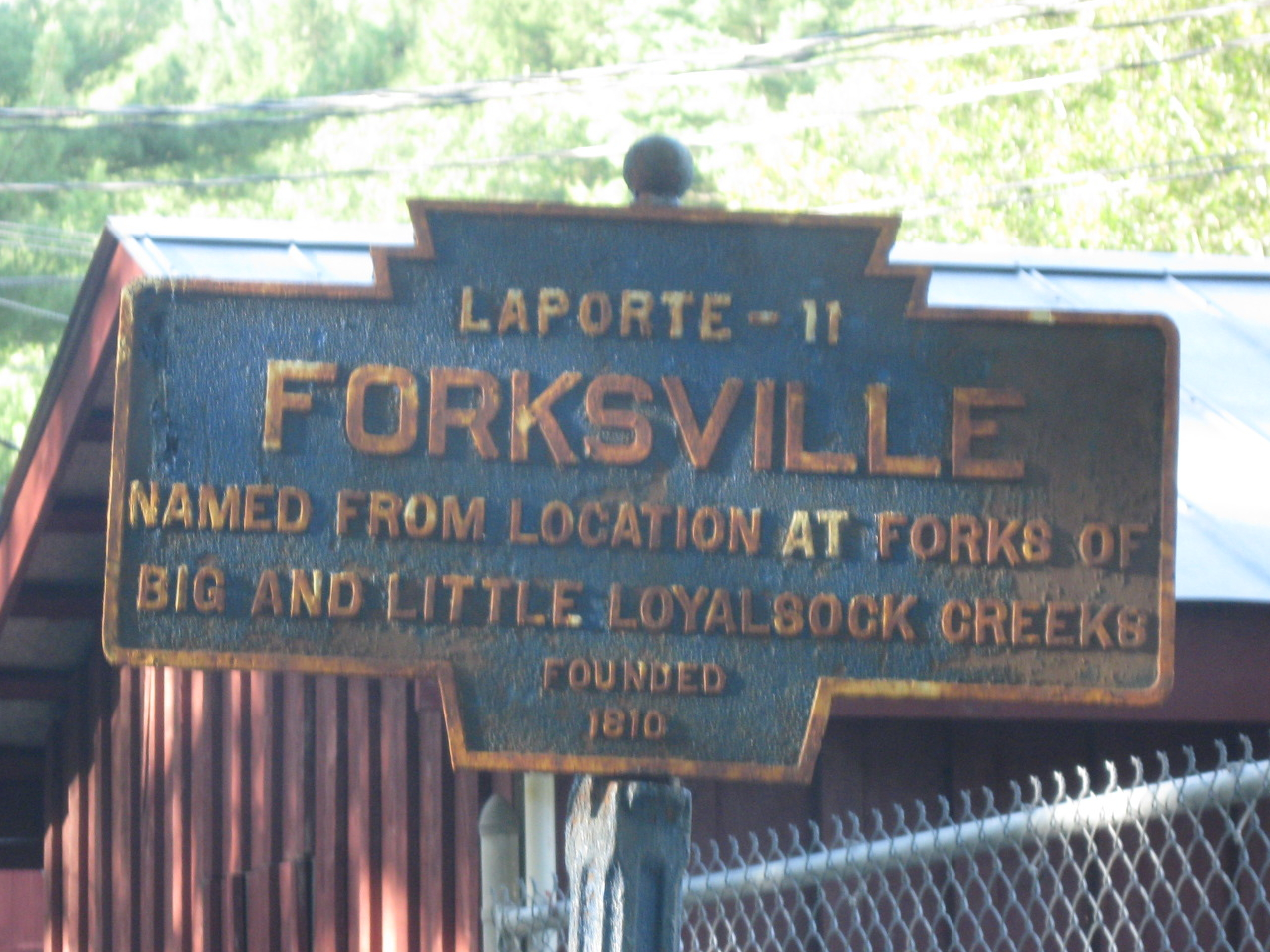
- Keystone Marker

- Location of Forksville in Sullivan County, Pennsylvania.

- Location within the U.S. state of Pennsylvania Forksville (the United States)
- Coordinates: 41°29′32″N 76°36′19″W
- Country: United States
- State: Pennsylvania
- County: Sullivan
- Settled: 1794
- Incorporated (borough): 1880

Area
  - Total: 1.58 sq mi (4.08 km^{2})
  - Land: 1.58 sq mi (4.08 km^{2})
  - Water: 0 sq mi (0.00 km^{2})
- Elevation: 1,001 ft (305 m)

Population (2020)
  - Total: 111
  - Density: 70.6/sq mi (27.24/km^{2})
- Time zone: Eastern (EST)
  - Summer (DST): EDT
- Zip code: 18616
- Area code: 570
- FIPS code: 42-26760

Forksville is a borough in Sullivan County, Pennsylvania, United States. The population was 110 at the 2020 census. It is the home of the 150-year-old Forksville General Store, down the road from the Sullivan County Fairgrounds, and near Worlds End State Park. The name comes from the confluence of Little Loyalsock Creek and Loyalsock Creek within the borough.

== History ==
The Forksville Covered Bridge was added to the National Register of Historic Places in 1980. Forksville was first permanently settled by William Molyneaux, John Warren and Powell Bird. A sawmill was built in the Forksville area in 1810. Forksville was formed from Forks Township in 1880.

== Geography ==
According to the United States Census Bureau, the borough has a total area of 1.5 square miles (3.9 km^{2}), all land.

== Demographics ==
Historical population
Census	Pop.	Note	%±
1880	108		—
1890	191		76.9%
1900	152		−20.4%
1910	109		−28.3%
1920	94		−13.8%
1930	105		11.7%
1940	108		2.9%
1950	145		34.3%
1960	131		−9.7%
1970	158		20.6%
1980	137		−13.3%
1990	160		16.8%
2000	147		−8.1%
2010	145		−1.4%
2020	111		−23.4%
2021 (est.)	111	Steady	0.0%

At the 2010 census, there were 145 people, 67 households, and 42 families residing in the borough. The population density was 96.6 people per square mile (37.3 people/km^{2}). There were 94 housing units at an average density of 62.4 per square mile (24.1/km^{2}). The racial makeup of the borough was 94.5% White, 2.1% Black, 2.8% Native American, and 0.6% two or more races.

Of the 67 households, 19.4% had children under the age of 18 living with them, 49.3% were married couples living together, 10.4% had a female householder with no husband present, and 37.3% were non-families. 31.3% of households were one person, and 16.4% were one person aged 65 or older. The average household size was 2.16 and the average family size was 2.60.

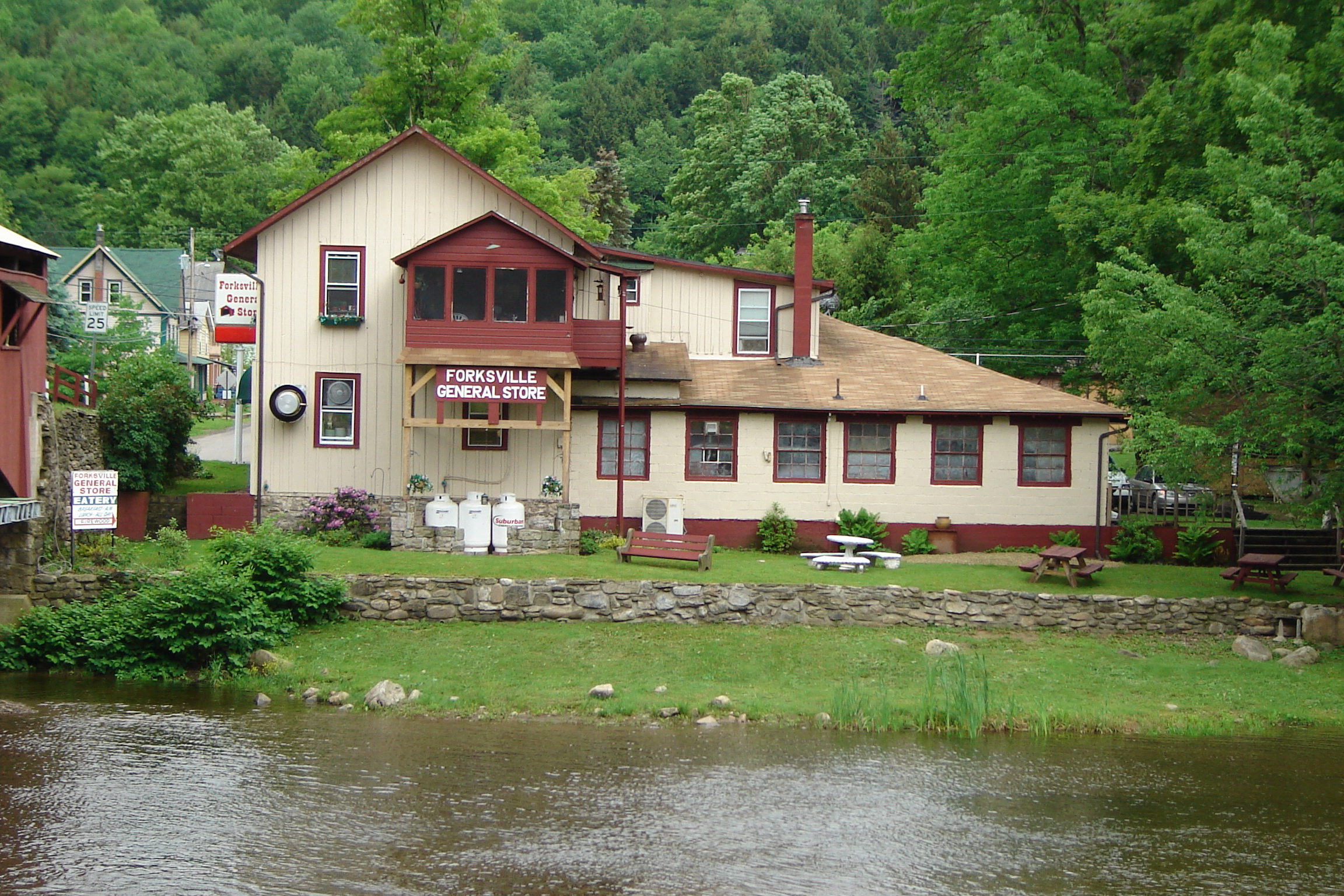
Forksville General Store near Worlds End State Park.

In the borough the population was spread out, with 13.1% under the age of 18, 66.2% from 18 to 64, and 20.7% 65 or older. The median age was 45.5 years.

The median household income was $26,625 and the median family income was $31,563. Males had a median income of $26,563 versus $25,417 for females. The per capita income for the borough was $13,943. There were 19.1% of families and 22.1% of the population living below the poverty line, including 36.4% of under eighteens and none of those over 64.

Forksville Borough is protected by the Forksville Volunteer Fire Company.

== Notable person ==
Red Grange, College and Pro Football Hall of Famer, was born in Forksville before moving to Wheaton, Illinois, at age five. Grange is widely considered to be the first superstar of the National Football League.
