= Hillgrove =

Hillgrove or Hill Grove may refer to:

== Places ==
- Hillgrove, California, United States
- Hillgrove, New South Wales, Australia
- Hillgrove, Nova Scotia, Canada
- Hill Grove, Ohio, United States
- Hill Grove, Virginia, United States

== Schools ==
- Hillgrove High School, in Cobb County, Georgia, United States
- Hillgrove Secondary School, in Bukit Batok, Singapore
- Hill Grove School, a historic school in Pittsylvania County, Virginia, United States

== See also ==
- Hillsgrove (disambiguation)
