= Loyalsock =

Loyalsock may refer to the following places:

- Loyalsock Creek, a tributary of the West Branch Susquehanna River in Pennsylvania
  - Loyalsock Trail, a hiking trail along Loyalsock Creek
- Loyalsock State Forest, a Pennsylvania State Forest
- Loyalsock Township, Pennsylvania
