= Kettle Creek Gorge Natural Area =

Natural area in Pennsylvania

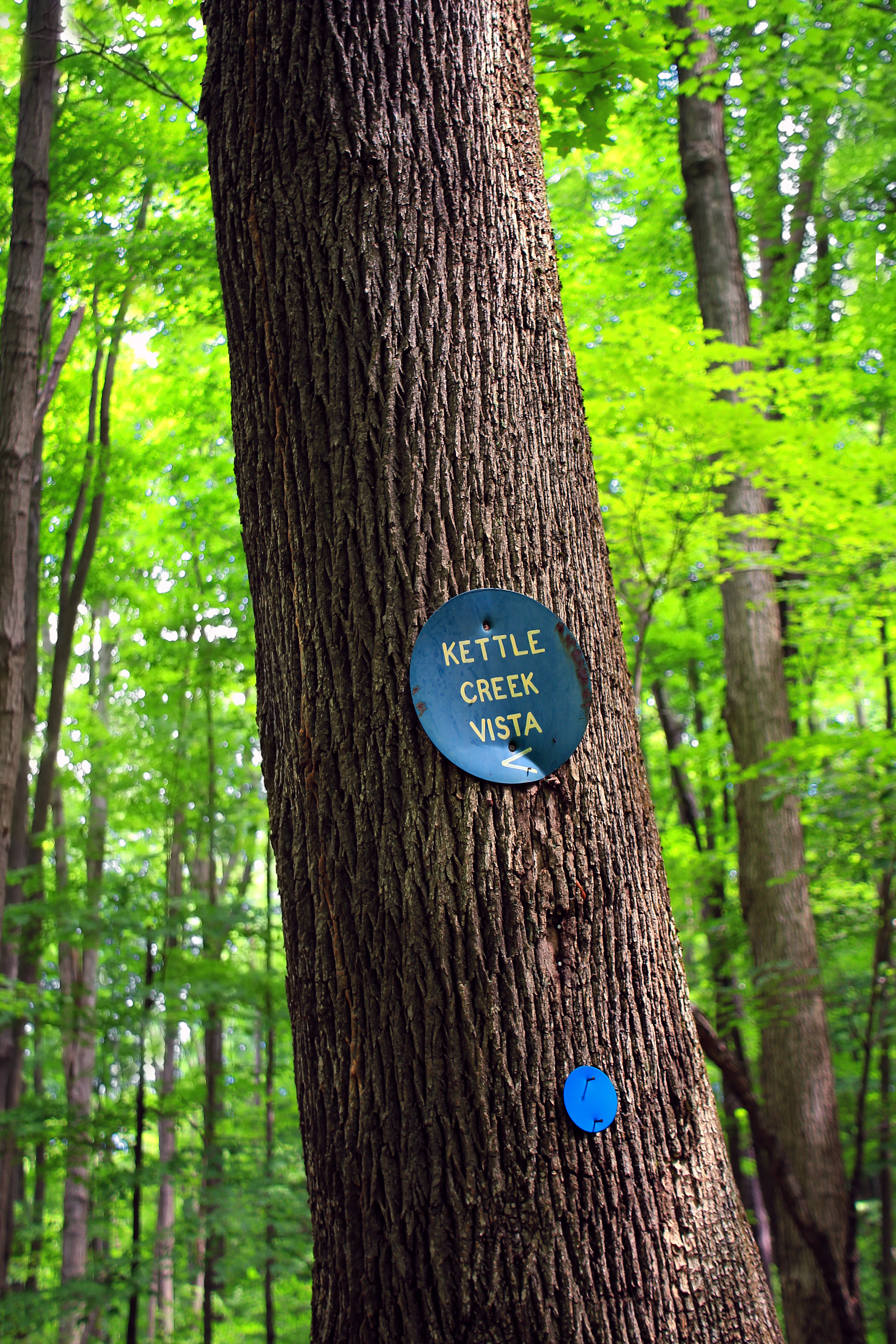
- The Loyalsock Trail in Kettle Creek Gorge Natural Area

- Location within Pennsylvania
- Location: Sullivan County, Pennsylvania
- Nearest town: Ogdonia
- Coordinates: 41°24′24″N 76°40′33″W
- Area: 774 acres (313 ha)
- Established: 1970

Kettle Creek Gorge Natural Area is a 774-acre (313 ha) protected area in Sullivan County, Pennsylvania, United States. It is part of Loyalsock State Forest.

== Description ==
The Natural Area is only accessible by foot, and protects a deep gorge formed by Kettle Creek (not to be confused with the creek of the same name in North-Central Pennsylvania). It also includes Angel Falls, one of the tallest waterfalls in the state.

The Natural Area is traversed by the long-distance Loyalsock Trail, and has been named by the state as a Natural Heritage Area.
