= Tamarack Run Natural Area =

Natural area in Pennsylvania

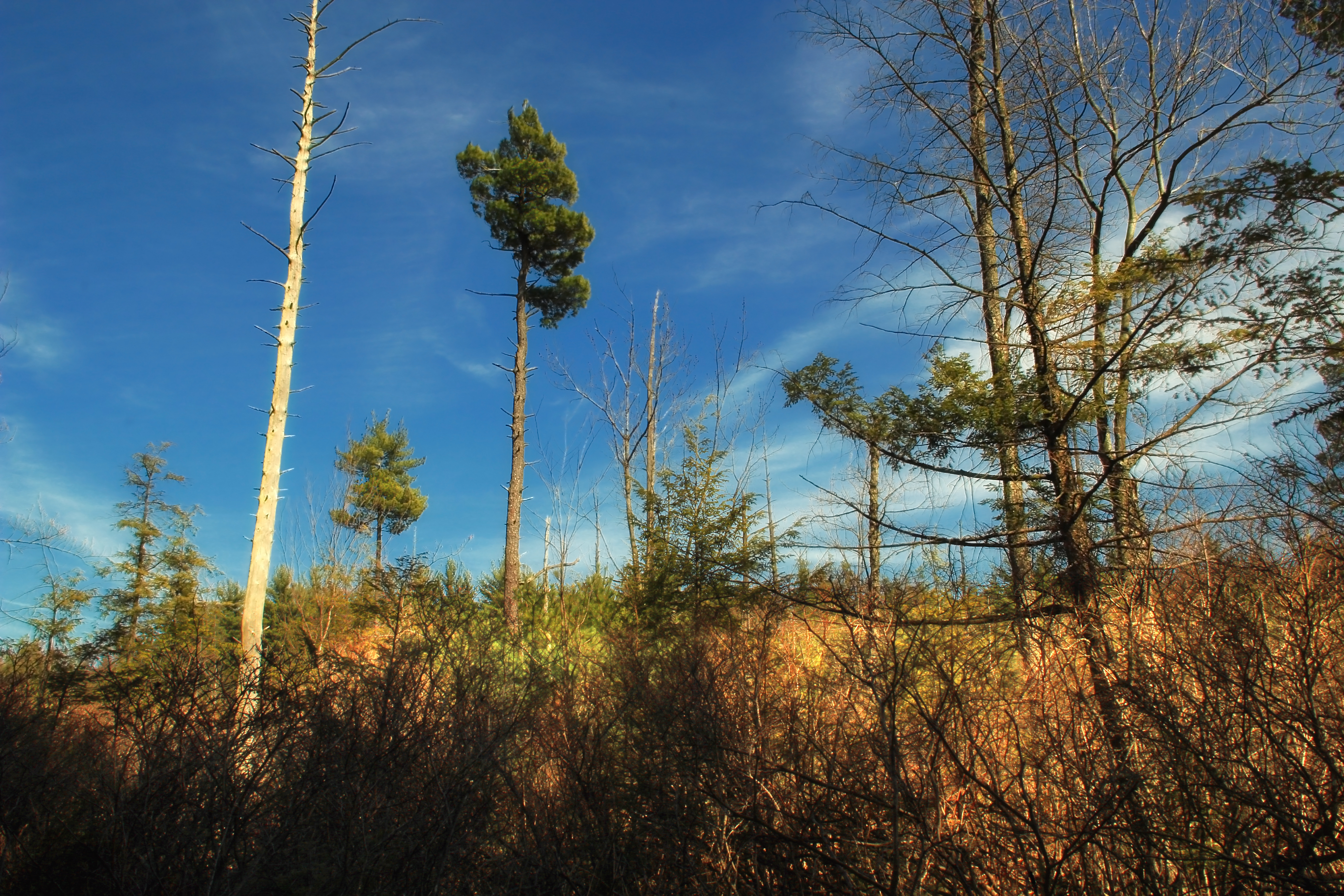
- A boreal conifer bog within the Tamarack Run Natural Area

- Location within Pennsylvania
- Location: Sullivan County, Pennsylvania
- Nearest town: Forksville
- Coordinates: 41°28′16″N 76°31′26″W
- Area: 234 acres (95 ha)

Tamarack Run Natural Area is a 234-acre (95 ha) protected area in Sullivan County, Pennsylvania, United States. It is part of Loyalsock State Forest.

== Description ==
The Natural Area protects a wetland featuring a population of tamarack trees which are relatively rare in Pennsylvania. The area also features two endangered plants: manna grass and Tuckerman's pondweed, and most of the area is a boggy marsh that makes visiting on foot difficult, though it is bordered by two gravel roads. The Natural Area can also be accessed via the long-distance Loyalsock Trail which passes near its northern boundary.
