= Hillsgrove =

Hillsgrove or Hills Grove may refer to the following places in the United States:

- Hillsgrove, Pennsylvania
- Hillsgrove Township, Sullivan County, Pennsylvania
  - Hillsgrove Covered Bridge
- Hillsgrove, Rhode Island
- Hills Grove, North Carolina

== See also ==
- Hillgrove (disambiguation)
