= Hillsgrove, Pennsylvania =

Unincorporated community in Pennsylvania, US

- Unincorporated community
- Location within Pennsylvania
- Coordinates: 41°26′38″N 76°42′26″W
- Country: United States
- State: Pennsylvania
- County: Sullivan
- Township: Hillsgrove
- Elevation: 873 ft (266 m)
- Time zone: UTC−5 (Eastern (EST))
  - Summer (DST): UTC−4 (EDT)
- ZIP code: 18619
- Area codes: 272 & 570
- GNIS feature ID: 1198890

Hillsgrove is an unincorporated community in Hillsgrove Township, Sullivan County, Pennsylvania, United States. The community is located along Loyalsock Creek and Pennsylvania Route 87, 6.4 miles (10.3 km) west-southwest of Forksville. It lies within the Endless Mountains region of northern Pennsylvania and is largely surrounded by Loyalsock State Forest. Hillsgrove has a post office with ZIP code 18619.

== Geography ==
Hillsgrove lies in the valley of Loyalsock Creek within the Endless Mountains, a dissected plateau region of northern Pennsylvania. The community sits at an elevation of 873 feet (266 m). The Loyalsock Creek flows through the township and drains southward to its mouth at the West Branch Susquehanna River near Montoursville.

Loyalsock State Forest, a 114,552-acre (463.58 km^{2}) state forest managed by the Pennsylvania Department of Conservation and Natural Resources, surrounds the community on multiple sides. The Hillsgrove Ranger Station, headquarters of the forest's District 20 maintenance section, is located approximately two miles south of the community along Dry Run Road near Pennsylvania Route 87. Worlds End State Park, a 780-acre (3.2 km^{2}) state park situated along the Loyalsock Creek near Forksville, lies northeast of Hillsgrove and is accessible via Pennsylvania Route 87 and Pennsylvania Route 154.

== History ==
=== Early settlement ===
The first known settler at what is now Hillsgrove was Daniel Ogden, who arrived around 1786, cleared land, and built a house and a small gristmill on the waters of Mill Creek. Ogden sold his property to John Hill, for whom the township was later named, and moved away around 1794. Hillsgrove Township was originally organized as Plunketts Creek Township when Sullivan County was established in 1847, and was renamed Hillsgrove by order of the county court in 1856.

=== Lumber era ===
Lumbering was the dominant industry in Sullivan County throughout the nineteenth century. Timber was cut and floated in rafts down Loyalsock Creek to market, with hemlock bark supplying local tanneries across the county. The Hillsgrove Covered Bridge, a Burr arch truss structure over Loyalsock Creek built around 1850 by Sadler Rogers, served as a crossing point during the lumber raft era. Rogers also built the Forksville Covered Bridge and the Sonestown Covered Bridge, the other two surviving covered bridges in Sullivan County. On July 2, 1973, the Hillsgrove Covered Bridge became the first covered bridge in Sullivan County to be listed on the National Register of Historic Places.

=== Civilian Conservation Corps ===
During the 1930s and early 1940s, the Civilian Conservation Corps (CCC) established several camps within Loyalsock State Forest to restore lands devastated by logging and wildfires. CCC Camp 96 was located approximately two miles south of Hillsgrove along Dry Run Road near Pennsylvania Route 87. The site was later developed into the Hillsgrove Ranger Station, which continues to serve as the base for District 20 of Loyalsock State Forest.

== Points of interest ==
- The Hillsgrove Covered Bridge is a Burr arch truss covered bridge over Loyalsock Creek, located on Covered Bridge Road (Township Road 357) in Hillsgrove Township. Built around 1850, it is the longest of Sullivan County's three remaining covered bridges and was listed on the National Register of Historic Places on July 2, 1973.
- The Hillsgrove Ranger Station of Loyalsock State Forest is located approximately two miles south of the community on Dry Run Road and occupies the former site of Civilian Conservation Corps Camp 96.
- Worlds End State Park is a 780-acre (3.2 km^{2}) Pennsylvania state park along Loyalsock Creek near Forksville, northeast of Hillsgrove.

== Transportation ==
Pennsylvania Route 87 is the primary road serving Hillsgrove, running through the Loyalsock Creek valley northeast toward Forksville and Worlds End State Park, and southwest toward Dushore. The route also provides access to the Hillsgrove Ranger Station via Dry Run Road.

== See also ==
- Hillsgrove Township, Sullivan County, Pennsylvania
- Hillsgrove Covered Bridge
- Loyalsock State Forest
- Worlds End State Park
