= Locust Hill (Hurt, Virginia) =

Historic house in Virginia, United States

- U.S. National Register of Historic Places
- Virginia Landmarks Register
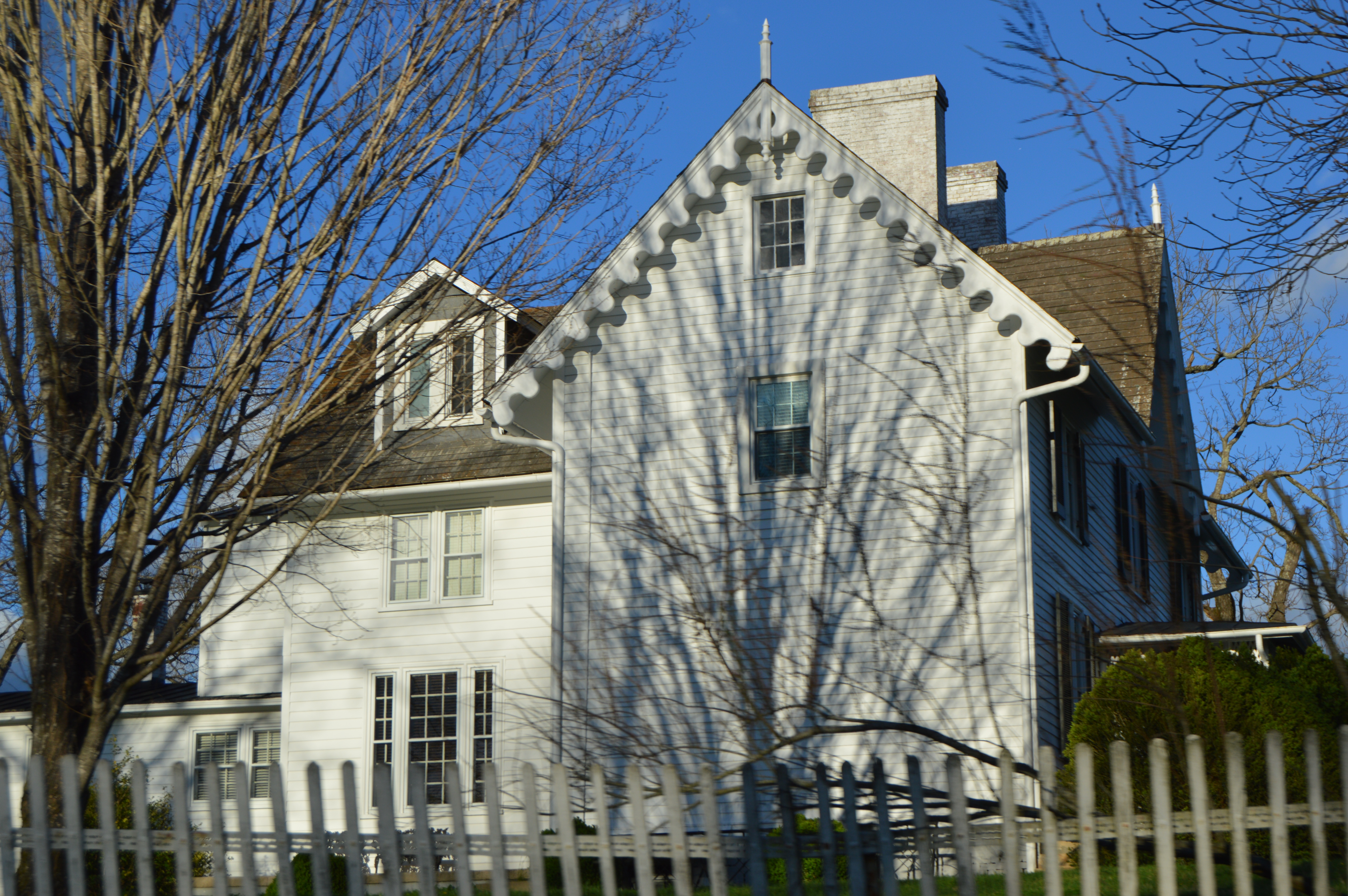
- Western side

- Location within Virginia Location within the United States
- Location: 7408 Wards Rd., Hurt, Virginia
- Coordinates: 37°06′47.3″N 79°14′41.3″W
- Area: 100 acres (40 ha)
- Built: 1861, 1930
- Architect: Enoch Johnson
- Architectural style: Late Victorian, Swiss Gothic
- NRHP reference No.: 02001449
- VLR No.: 071-5153

Significant dates
- Added to NRHP: November 27, 2002
- Designated VLR: September 11, 2002

Locust Hill is a historic home and farm complex located near Hurt, Pittsylvania County, Virginia, United States. The house was built in two sections with the main section built in 1861, and expanded with a three-story rear ell in 1930. The original section is a 2 1/2-story, three-bay, frame dwelling in the Swiss Gothic style. It has a steeply pitched gable roof that incorporates two central chimneys and four gable ends decorated in ornamental bargeboard. Also on the property are a number of contributing resources including a tavern, a servants' quarter, a kitchen, an icehouse, a chicken house, a smoke house, a dairy, a servants' quarter, a caretaker's house, a grist mill, a dam, a family cemetery, and the ruins of an 18th-century house.

It was listed on the National Register of Historic Places in 2002.
