= Hurt, Virginia =

- Town
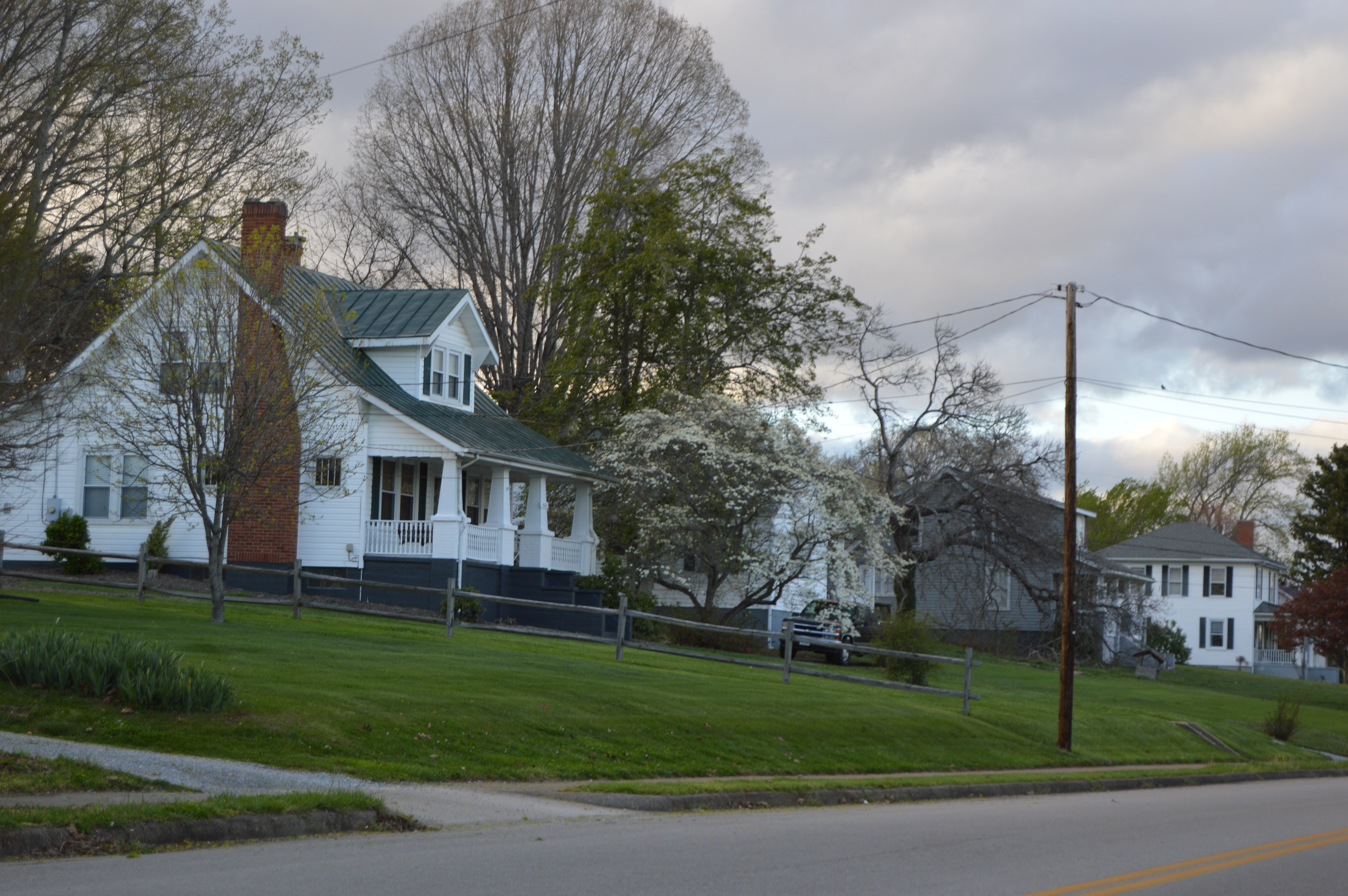
- Houses on Prospect Road

- Seal

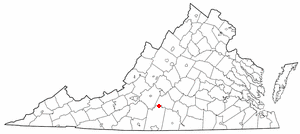
- Location of Hurt, Virginia
- Coordinates: 37°5′42″N 79°17′54″W
- Country: United States
- State: Virginia
- County: Pittsylvania

Government
  - Type: Council-Manager
  - Mayor: Gary Hodnett
  - Town Council: Bob Majure; Gary Poindexter; Paul Johnson; Michael Blackstock; Kathy Keesee; Steve Worley

Area
  - Total: 3.51 sq mi (9.10 km^{2})
  - Land: 3.47 sq mi (9.00 km^{2})
  - Water: 0.035 sq mi (0.09 km^{2})
- Elevation: 748 ft (228 m)

Population (2020)
  - Total: 1,267
  - Estimate (2020): 1,267
  - Density: 370/sq mi (141/km^{2})
- Time zone: UTC-5 (Eastern (EST))
  - Summer (DST): UTC-4 (EDT)
- ZIP code: 24563
- Area code: 434
- FIPS code: 51-39224
- GNIS feature ID: 1468433
- Website: www.townofhurtva.gov

Hurt is a town in Pittsylvania County, Virginia, United States. The population was 1,269 at the 2020 census. It is included in the Danville, Virginia metropolitan area.

== History ==
The community bears the name of Colonel John R. Hurt, an early citizen.

Hill Grove School and Locust Hill are listed on the National Register of Historic Places.

== Geography ==
According to the United States Census Bureau, the town has a total area of 3.51 square miles (9 km^{2}).

The sole major road to pass through the town is U.S. Route 29, via a business spur that also goes through Altavista; the main road bypasses both towns to the west.

== Demographics ==
Historical population
Census	Pop.	Note	%±
1970	1,434		—
1980	1,481		3.3%
1990	1,294		−12.6%
2000	1,276		−1.4%
2010	1,304		2.2%
2020	1,267		−2.8%
U.S. Decennial Census

2000 As of the census of 2000, there were 1,276 people, 541 households, and 385 families living in the town. The population density was 487.2 people per square mile (188.0/km^{2}). There were 592 housing units at an average density of 226.0 per square mile (87.2/km^{2}). The racial makeup of the town was 86.52% White, 12.07% African American, 0.16% Native American, 0.39% Asian, 0.31% from other races, and 0.55% from two or more races. Hispanic or Latino of any race were 0.94% of the population.

There were 541 households, out of which 29.2% had children under the age of 18 living with them, 56.4% were married couples living together, 11.8% had a female householder with no husband present, and 28.7% were non-families. 24.8% of all households were made up of individuals, and 11.6% had someone living alone who was 65 years of age or older. The average household size was 2.36 and the average family size was 2.80.

In the town, the population was spread out, with 21.7% under the age of 18, 6.9% from 18 to 24, 28.4% from 25 to 44, 25.3% from 45 to 64, and 17.7% who were 65 years of age or older. The median age was 41 years. For every 100 females there were 87.6 males. For every 100 females aged 18 and over, there were 86.7 males.

The median income for a household in the town was $36,467, and the median income for a family was $40,938. Males had a median income of $29,219 versus $21,675 for females. The per capita income for the town was $16,875. About 9.3% of families and 10.7% of the population were below the poverty line, including 17.6% of those under age 18 and 13.0% of those age 65 or over.

== Notable people ==
- Stacy Compton, NASCAR driver
