= Hill Grove, Virginia =

Unincorporated community in Virginia, US

Coordinates: 37°03′29″N 79°15′23″W

Hill Grove is an unincorporated community in Pittsylvania County, in the U.S. state of Virginia.

== See also ==
- Hill Grove School
