= Devil's Elbow Natural Area =

Natural area in Pennsylvania

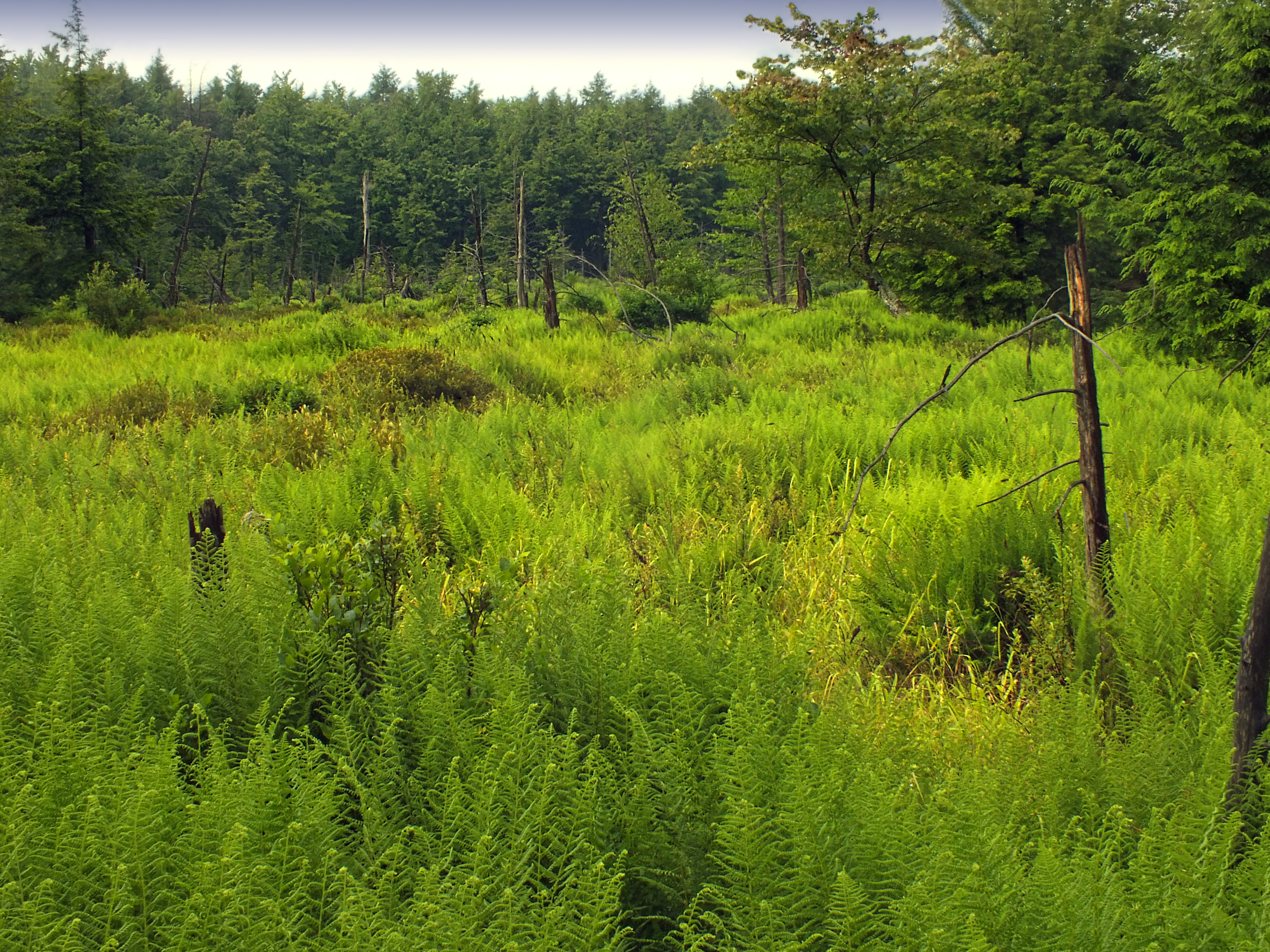

- Location within Pennsylvania
- Location: Lycoming County, Pennsylvania
- Nearest town: Grover
- Coordinates: 41°34′17″N 76°49′13″W
- Area: 404 acres (163 ha)

Devil's Elbow Natural Area is a 404-acre (163 ha) protected area in Lycoming County, Pennsylvania, United States. It is part of Loyalsock State Forest.

== Description ==
The Natural Area surrounds two branches of Rock Run in the northeastern corner of Lycoming County, and protects several wetlands that host native carnivorous plants that are rare in Pennsylvania such as sundew and pitcher plant. The area's name references a sharp turn in a nearby road, though the Natural Area itself can only be accessed on foot. There are also folk legends of ghosts in the area.
