= Hillgrove, California =

Unincorporated community in California, US

- Unincorporated community & Former Census-designated place (CDP)
- Location within the state of California Hillgrove, California (the United States)
- Coordinates: 34°01′01″N 117°58′48″W
- Country: United States
- State: California
- County: Los Angeles

Population (1960)
  - Total: 14,669
- Time zone: UTC-8 (Pacific (PST))
  - Summer (DST): UTC-7 (PDT)
- ZIP codes: 91745
- Area code: 626
- GNIS feature ID: 243472

Hillgrove is an unincorporated community located in the southern San Gabriel Valley of eastern Los Angeles County, California, United States. The population in 1960 was 14,669.

A former section was a census-designated place that became part of neighboring Hacienda Heights after the 1970 census.

== Geography ==
Hillgrove is located at 34.017 degrees north latitude and 117.98 degrees west longitude. The community of Avocado Heights is to the west, the Puente Hills are to the south, and Hacienda Heights is to the southeast.

The elevation of the community is 331 feet (101 m) above sea level. The ZIP Code serving the community is 91745.

== Education ==
The community is served by the Hacienda-Puente Unified School District. Hillgrove Center Preschool is located in the community.
