= Loyalsock State Forest =

State forest in Pennsylvania, United States

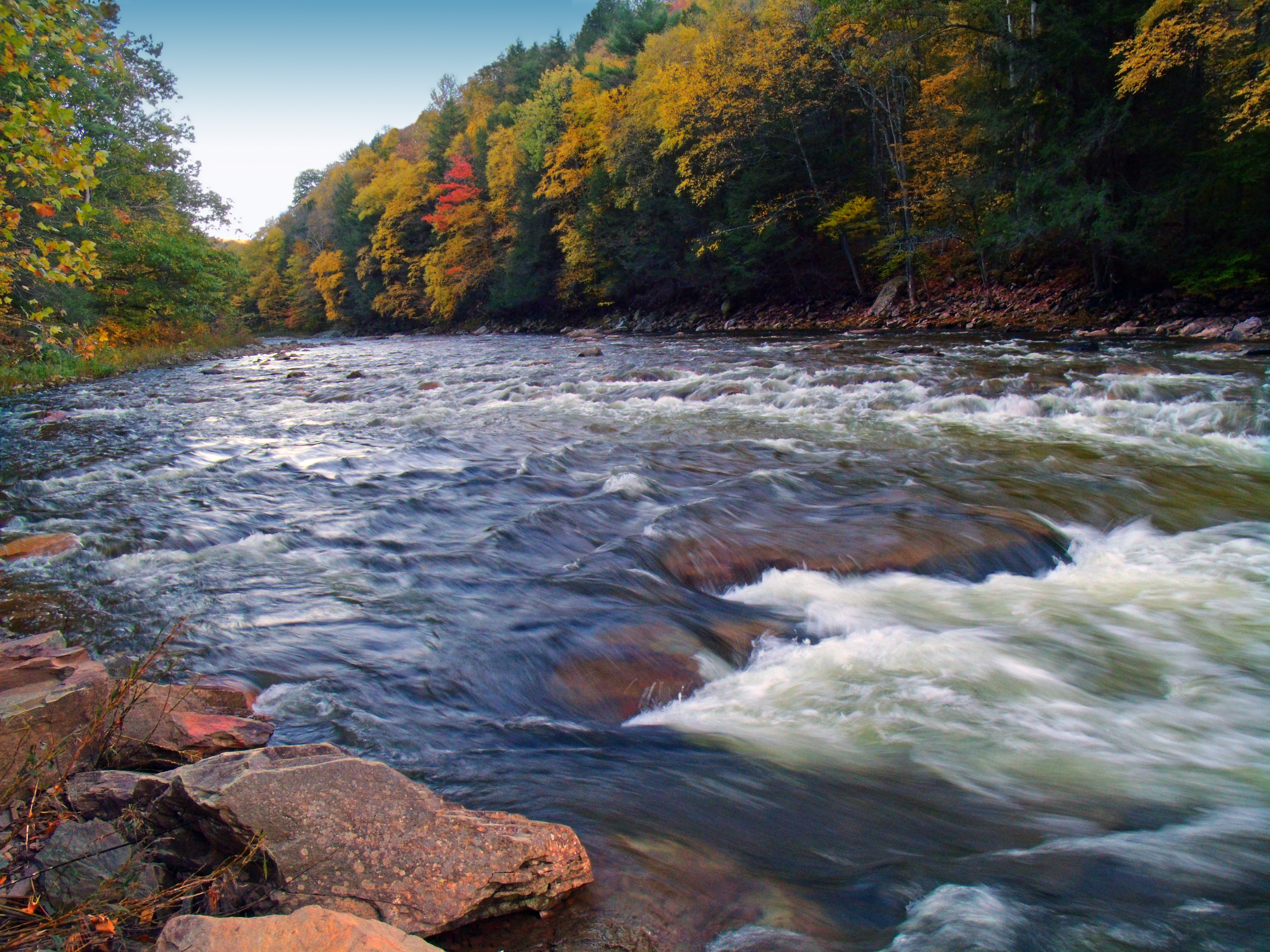
- Loyalsock Creek in Loyalsock State Forest in Sullivan County

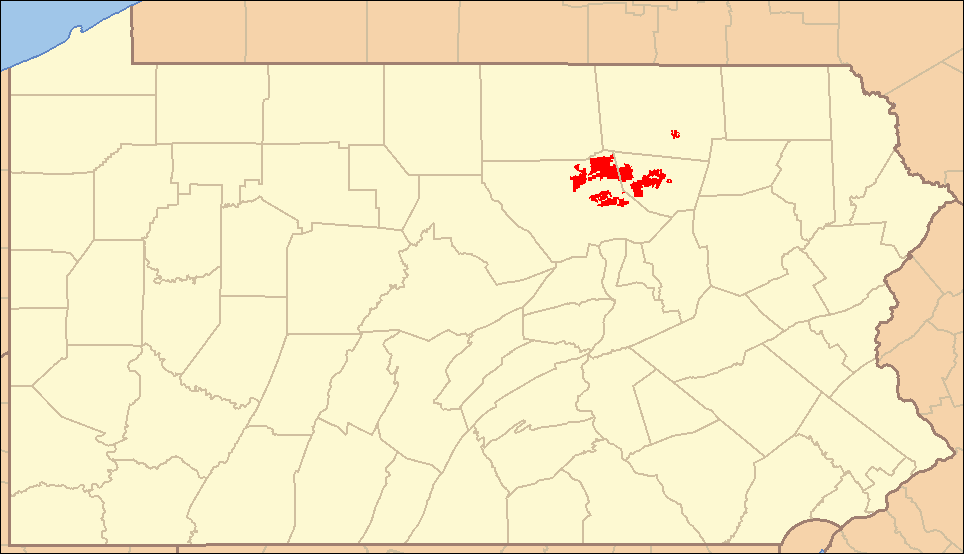
- Location of Loyalsock State Forest in Pennsylvania
- Location: Bradford, Lycoming, & Sullivan Counties in Pennsylvania, United States
- Coordinates: 41°30′39″N 76°43′13″W
- Elevation: 1,765 ft (538 m)
- Established: 1929
- Named for: Loyalsock Creek
- Governing body: Pennsylvania Department of Conservation and Natural Resources
- Website: Loyalsock State Forest

Loyalsock State Forest is a Pennsylvania state forest in Pennsylvania Bureau of Forestry District #20. The forest spans across the northern tier's "Endless Mountains" and is a total of 114,552 acres (46,358 ha). The Loyalsock is a “working forest” and is managed for pure water, recreation, plant and animal habitats, sustainable timber, and natural gas.

In 2008, the District 20 office was moved into a new facility on the districts far eastern boundary in Dushore, Pennsylvania in Sullivan County in the United States. The Hillsgrove Ranger Station, which also houses the districts maintenance section, is located in Hillsgrove, Pennsylvania in Sullivan County.

== History ==
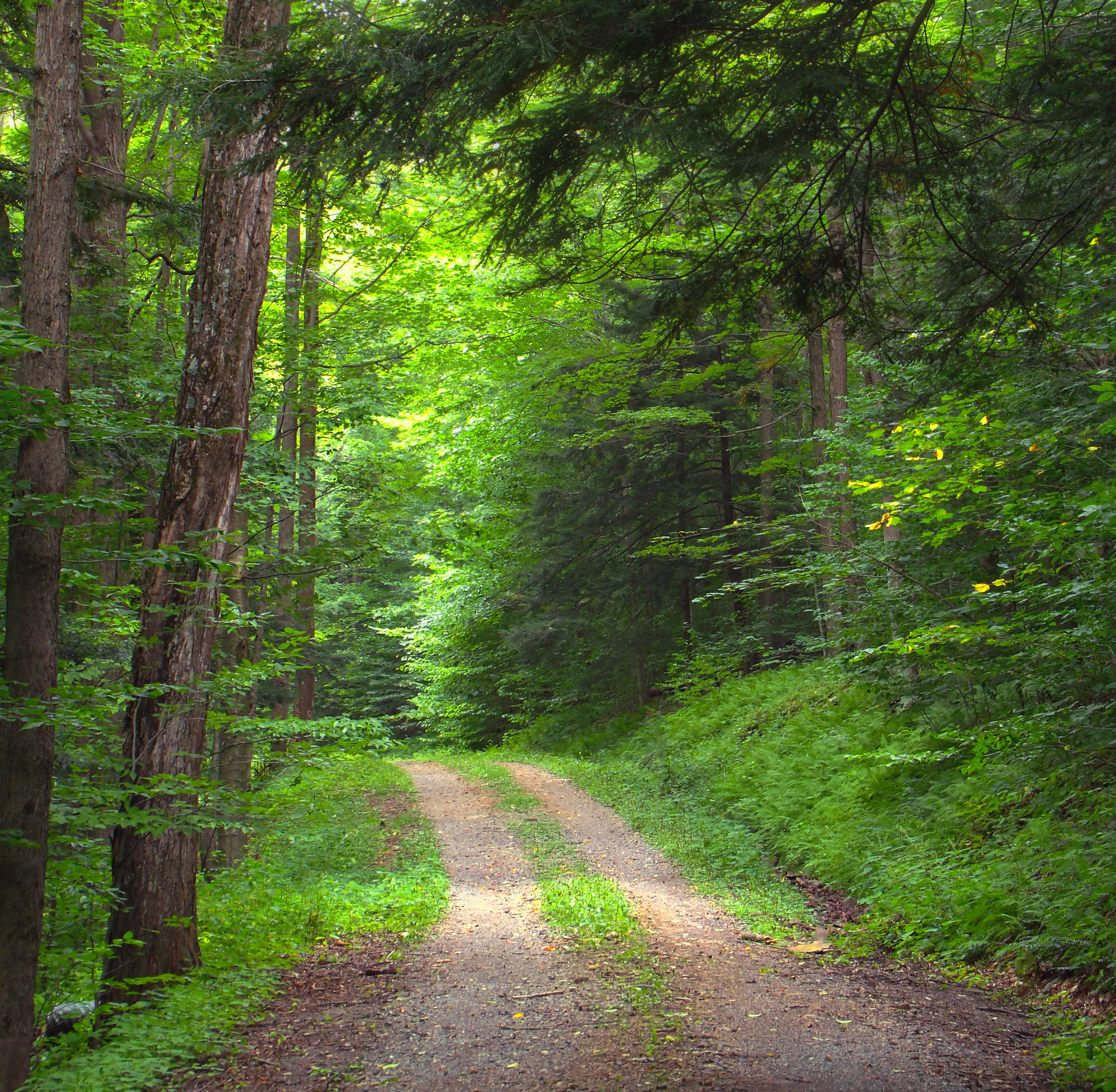
A trail in Loyalsock State Forest

The state forests of Pennsylvania were formed as a direct result of the depletion of the forests of Pennsylvania that took place during the mid-to-late 19th century. Conservationists like Dr. Joseph Rothrock became concerned that the forests would not regrow if they were not managed properly. Lumber and Iron companies had harvested the old-growth forests for various reasons. They clear cut the forests and left behind nothing but dried tree tops and rotting stumps. The sparks of passing steam locomotives ignited wildfires that prevented the formation of second growth forests.

Conservationists feared that the forest would never regrow if there was not a change in the philosophy of forest management. They called for the state to purchase land from the lumber and iron companies, and the companies were more than willing to sell their land since they had depleted the natural resources of the forests. The changes began to take place in 1895 when Dr. Rothrock was appointed the first commissioner of the Pennsylvania Department of Forests and Waters, the forerunner of today's Pennsylvania Department of Conservation and Natural Resources. The Pennsylvania General Assembly passed a piece of legislation in 1897 that authorized the purchase of "unseated lands for forest reservations." This was the beginning of the State Forest system.

The history of the Loyalsock state forest goes back to 1929, when following the great lumber era the Pennsylvania Department of Forests and Waters, a precursor to the modern Pennsylvania Department of Conservation and Natural Resources, began purchasing land from the Central Pennsylvania Lumber Company. Much of it had been devastated by logging and wild fires, but it would go on to create the Wyoming State Forest. Throughout the forest ran a network of narrow gauge railroad tracks on which steam powered locomotives had pulled flatcars loaded with logs to sawmill towns that grown up overnight and disappeared just as quickly. During the 1930s and early 1940s the Civilian Conservation Corps (CCC), developed camps which replaced these, now ghost, sawmill towns and logging camps. CCC Camps 80, 95, 96, 126, 128, and 145 were all located within the Loyalsock State Forest. The Hillsgrove Ranger Station is actually located on the site of old Camp 96.

In 2005, the Loyalsock State Forest was designated by combining the Wyoming State Forest in Sullivan County with the eastern half of the Tiadaghton State Forest) in eastern Lycoming County, and a portion of the Tioga State Forest) in eastern Bradford County. The newly re-aligned state forest district was named after the Loyalsock Creek which flows through the center of the district.

== Marcellus Shale Development ==
The Loyalsock State Forest lies in the heart of the Marcellus Shale Fairway. Out of its total 114,552 acres the Commonwealth controls the mineral rights to 72,752, and of those 20,646 have been leased by DCNR to drilling companies. 2014 Shale Gas Monitoring Report, Table 1.1. - Pennsylvania Department of Conservation and Natural Resources This includes Seneca Resources, a division of National Fuel, and Anadarko Petroleum Corporation. Seneca claims wells drilled in the area are highly productive.

=== Clarence Moore Lands ===
The Clarence Moore Lands refers to approximately 25,000 acres within the Lycoming County area of the Loyalsock State Forest. It includes the Old Logger’s Path, the headwaters and a portion of the Rock Run waterway, Pleasant Stream Valley, Sharp Top Vista and the ghost-town of Masten. The controversy centers over ownership and access rights to the natural gas under this area. Of the approximately 25,000 acres of Loyalsock State Forest, Commonwealth Court in 1989 found that the right of the subsurface owner (Clarence Moore) to enter upon the surface expired in 1983 on about 18,000 acres, but on the remaining 7,000 acres, which are in scattered blocks throughout the Clarence Moore Lands, the state cannot prohibit surface access to the subsurface mineral rights. Anadarko Petroleum Corp. have since claimed they have acquired 50% of the subsurface mineral rights for the entire 25,000 acres, and they have subsequently approached DNCR about developing their subsurface resources. Loyalsock State Forest Clarence Moore Lands Fact Sheet - Pennsylvania Department of Conservation and Natural Resources

== Neighboring state forest districts ==
The U.S. state of New York is to the north

- Pinchot State Forest (east)
- Weiser State Forest (south)
- Tiadaghton State Forest (southwest)
- Tioga State Forest (northwest)

== Nearby state parks ==
- Worlds End State Park
- Ricketts Glen State Park

== Attractions ==
=== High Knob Overlook ===
High Knob Overlook is a scenic vista located inside of the Loyalsock State Forest. At 2,020 ft above sea level, it is possible to see the mountain tops of seven counties.

High Knob Overlook offers parking, free admission, bicycling, and 6.75 miles of trails for hiking. Because High Knob is located in the rural area of Hillsgrove, PA, High Knob Overlook has a Bortle-rating of 3 (rural level light pollution) and it has its own Clear Dark Sky Chart.

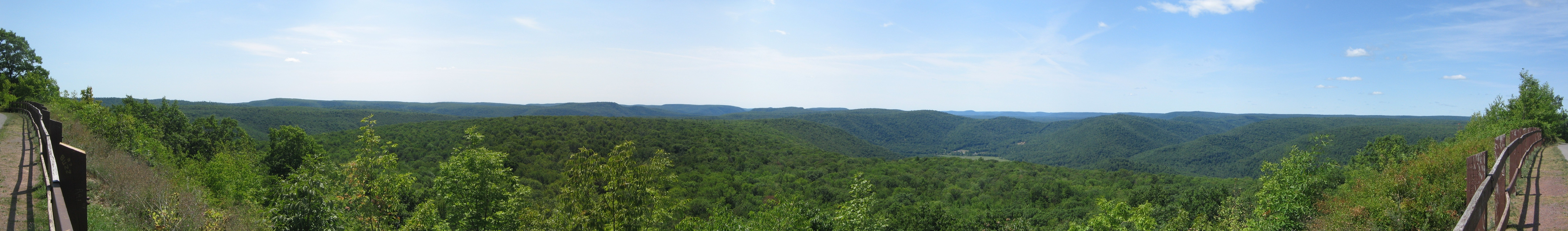
Panorama of the Loyalsock State Forest from the High Knob Overlook in Hillsgrove Township, Sullivan County, Pennsylvania, United States. There is a relatively level horizon as this area is part of the dissected Allegheny Plateau.

=== Hiking ===
There are approximately 200 miles of marked and unmarked trails located throughout the Loyalsock State Forest.

- Loyalsock Trail, 59.3 miles (95.4 km) along Loyalsock Creek in Lycoming and Sullivan counties
- Old Loggers Path, a loop of 27.8 miles (44.7 km) in the Pleasant Stream and Rock Run valleys in northeast Lycoming County

=== Natural and wild areas ===
- Devils Elbow Natural Area, 404 acres (163 ha), is noted for its many emergent, shrub, and forested wetlands and is home to wetland carnivorous plants such as sundew and pitcher plant.
- Kettle Creek Gorge Natural Area, 774 acres (313 ha), which was set aside in 1970 to permit scientific observation of natural systems, protect examples of typical or unique flora and fauna communities.
- Tamarack Run Natural Area, 234 acres (95 ha), is a boreal conifer wetland that provides protection for the plants, amphibians, and reptiles of the area.
- Kettle Creek Wild Area, 2,600 acres (1,100 ha), buffers the Kettle Creek Gorge Natural Area and is home to Kettle Creek, a wilderness trout stream.
- McIntyre Wild Area, 7,500 acres (3,035 ha), holds the complete watersheds of four streams that cascade into numerous waterfalls. It gets its name from the old 19th-century mining town of McIntyre, whose ruins of buildings and facilities can still be found. The Band Rock Vista is also located in this area and provides views of the Lycoming Creek Valley.
