= Worlds End State Park =

Park in Sullivan County, Pennsylvania, US

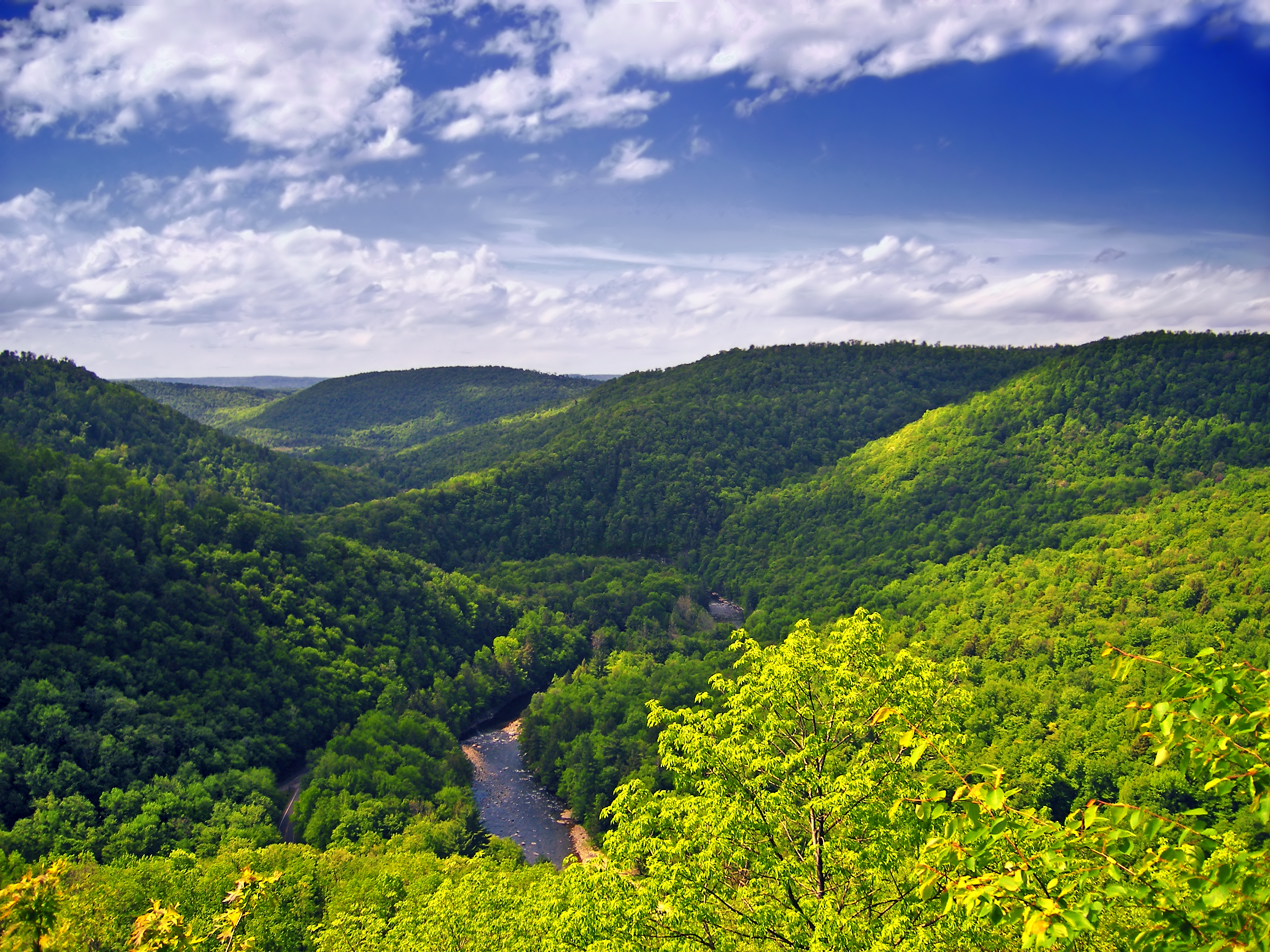
- Worlds End State Park and Loyalsock Creek from the Canyon Vista on Cold Run Road

- Location within Pennsylvania
- Interactive map of Worlds End State Park
- Location: Sullivan County, Pennsylvania, United States
- Coordinates: 41°28′18″N 76°34′54″W (Park office and visitors center)
- Area: 780 acres (320 ha)
- Elevation: 1,175 ft (358 m)
- Established: 1932
- Administrator: Pennsylvania Department of Conservation and Natural Resources
- Named for: The remote location or a whirlpool in Loyalsock Creek
- Website: Official website

Worlds End State Park is a 780-acre (316 ha) Pennsylvania state park in Sullivan County, Pennsylvania. The park, nearly surrounded by Loyalsock State Forest, is in the Loyalsock Creek valley on Pennsylvania Route 154 in Forks and Shrewsbury Townships southeast of the borough of Forksville. The name Worlds End has been used since at least 1872, but its origins are uncertain. Although it was founded as Worlds End State Forest Park by Governor Gifford Pinchot in 1932, the park was officially known as Whirls End State Forest Park from 1936 to 1943.

The park's land was once home to Native Americans, followed by settlers who cleared the forests for subsistence farming and later built sawmills. The second growth forests in and surrounding Worlds End State Park are partially a result of the efforts of the young men of the Civilian Conservation Corps during the Great Depression. They helped overcome the clearcutting of the early 20th century, and built many of the park's facilities, including the cabins that earned it a place on the National Register of Historic Places.

A wide variety of wildlife is found in the park, which is also part of an Important Bird Area. Located in the Endless Mountains region of the dissected Allegheny Plateau, Worlds End has a continental climate and rocks and fossils from the Carboniferous period. It is one of "Twenty Must-See Pennsylvania State Parks" named by the Pennsylvania Department of Conservation and Natural Resources, which describes it as "[v]irtually in a class by itself, this wild, rugged and rustic area seems almost untamed". The park offers year-round recreational opportunities, including environmental education, hiking, camping in tents and cabins, whitewater rafting, swimming, cross-country skiing, snowmobiling, hunting, and fishing.

== Name ==
An 1872 map uses the name Worlds End for the area around the S-shaped serpentine bend in Loyalsock Creek. Worlds End State Forest Park opened in 1932, and its name has caused some confusion and controversy over the years. William S. Swingler, Assistant District Forester of Wyoming State Forest (reorganized as Loyalsock State Forest in 2005), penned this note about the story of the name in 1935:

There was even a dispute as to the proper name of the area. Some people called it Worlds End, others Whirl's Glen, and still others Whirls End. The first name arose from the topography of the place. Seven mountain ranges converge on the point and one does receive the sensation of being at the ultimate ends of the earth. The proponents of the second name base their claim upon the whirlpool in the Loyalsock Creek, and the third name was probably a contraction of the other two. Since the whirlpool had largely disappeared, it was decided that the name Worlds End would be most appropriate. Hence, the name Worlds End State Forest Park.

This was not the end of the controversy. A letter campaign led to the name of the park being changed to Whirls End State Forest Park in 1936; opponents of the new name launched another letter-writing campaign to revert the name to Worlds End State Forest Park. This matter was brought before the State Geographic Board, which supervised the official naming of places. The board ruled that the name be changed once again to Worlds End State Forest Park in 1943. The word Forest was dropped on November 11, 1954, when the park was officially named Worlds End State Park by the Pennsylvania Geographic Board. This has been the official name ever since, but the names Whirls End and Whirls Glen are still used, and are synonymous with Worlds End.

Two other etymologies have been suggested. The first is that an early road along the gorge had a sheer drop to the creek hundreds of feet below, which prompted thoughts of the world's end in early travelers. The second is that the bend in Loyalsock Creek, and the surrounding area that became the park, was originally known as Huerle's Bend, but then "years of mispronunciation turned it into World's End (State Park)". Whatever the source, as of 2012 the name Worlds End State Park is unique in the USGS Geographic Names Information System and on its maps of the United States. The possessive apostrophe is not part of the official name, although it does appear in older records and in informal usage today.

== History ==
=== Native Americans ===
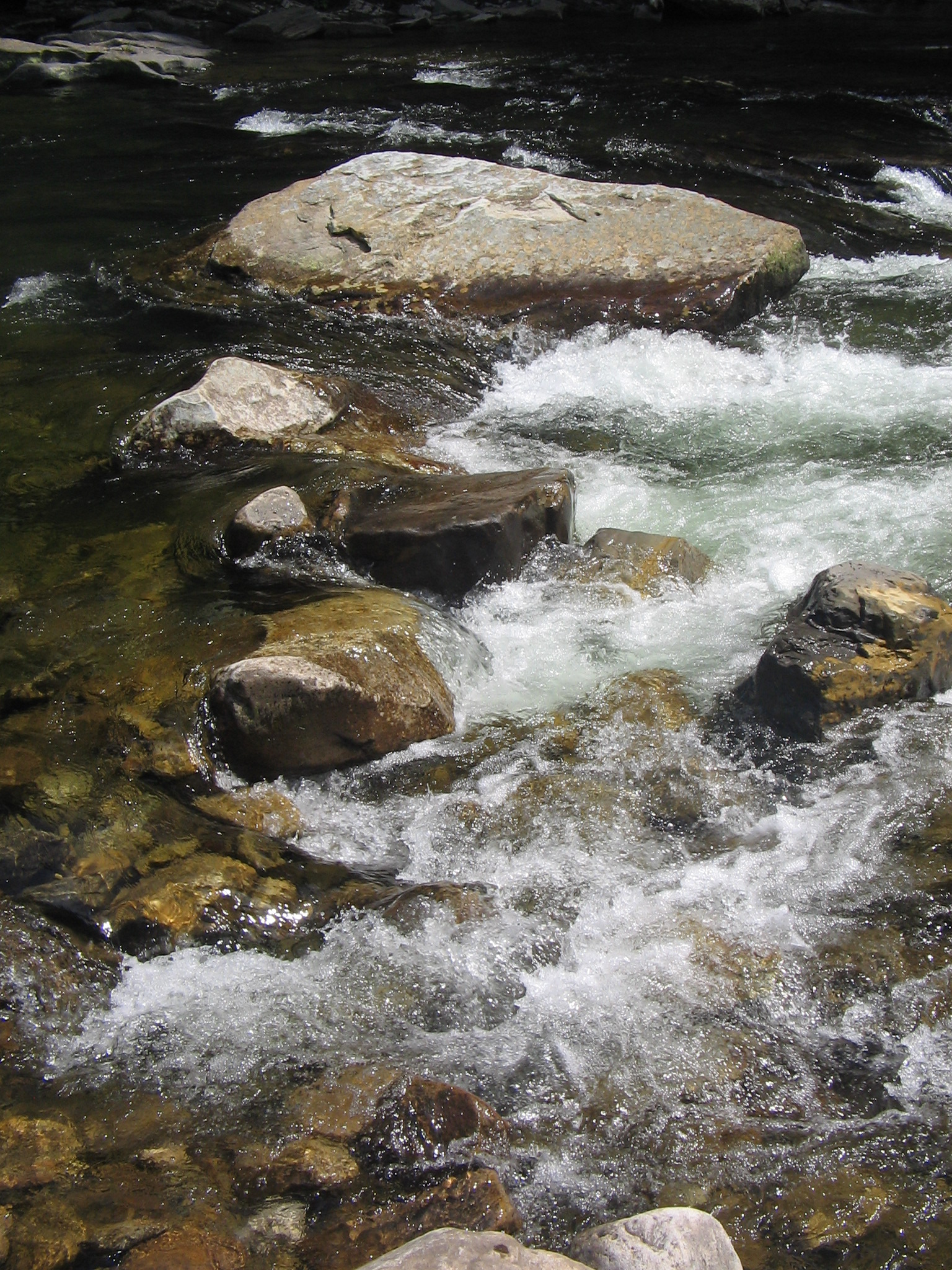
Loyalsock Creek's name comes from the Lenape (Delaware) word Lawi-saquick or "middle creek".

Humans have lived in what is now Pennsylvania since at least 10,000 BC. The first settlers were Paleo-Indian nomadic hunters known from their stone tools. The hunter-gatherers of the Archaic period, which lasted locally from 7000 to 1000 BC, used a greater variety of more sophisticated stone artefacts. The Woodland period marked the gradual transition to semi-permanent villages and horticulture, between 1000 BC and 1500 AD. Archeological evidence found in the state from this time includes a range of pottery types and styles, burial mounds, pipes, bows and arrow, and ornaments.

Worlds End State Park is in the West Branch Susquehanna River drainage basin, whose earliest recorded inhabitants were the Iroquoian-speaking Susquehannocks. They were a matriarchial society that lived in stockaded villages of large longhouses. Their numbers were greatly reduced by disease and warfare with the Five Nations of the Iroquois, and by 1675 they had died out, moved away, or been assimilated into other tribes.

After this, the lands of the West Branch Susquehanna River valley were under the nominal control of the Iroquois. The Iroquois also lived in longhouses, primarily in what is now New York, and had a strong confederacy which gave them power beyond their numbers. To fill the void left by the demise of the Susquehannocks, the Iroquois encouraged displaced tribes from the east to settle in the West Branch watershed, including the Shawnee and Lenape (or Delaware).

The French and Indian War (1754–1763) led to the migration of many Native Americans westward to the Ohio River basin. On November 5, 1768, the Province of Pennsylvania acquired the New Purchase from the Iroquois in the Treaty of Fort Stanwix, including what is now Worlds End State Park. After the American Revolutionary War, Native Americans almost entirely left Pennsylvania.

The land that became Sullivan County was originally part of Northumberland County, then became part of Lycoming County when it was formed in 1795. Settlers first arrived in the park's townships in 1794. Shrewsbury Township was formed from Muncy Township in 1803, and Forks Township was formed from Shrewsbury Township in 1833, both while still part of Lycoming County. Sullivan County was formed from the northeastern part of Lycoming County on March 15, 1847.

=== Horse trails and lumber era ===
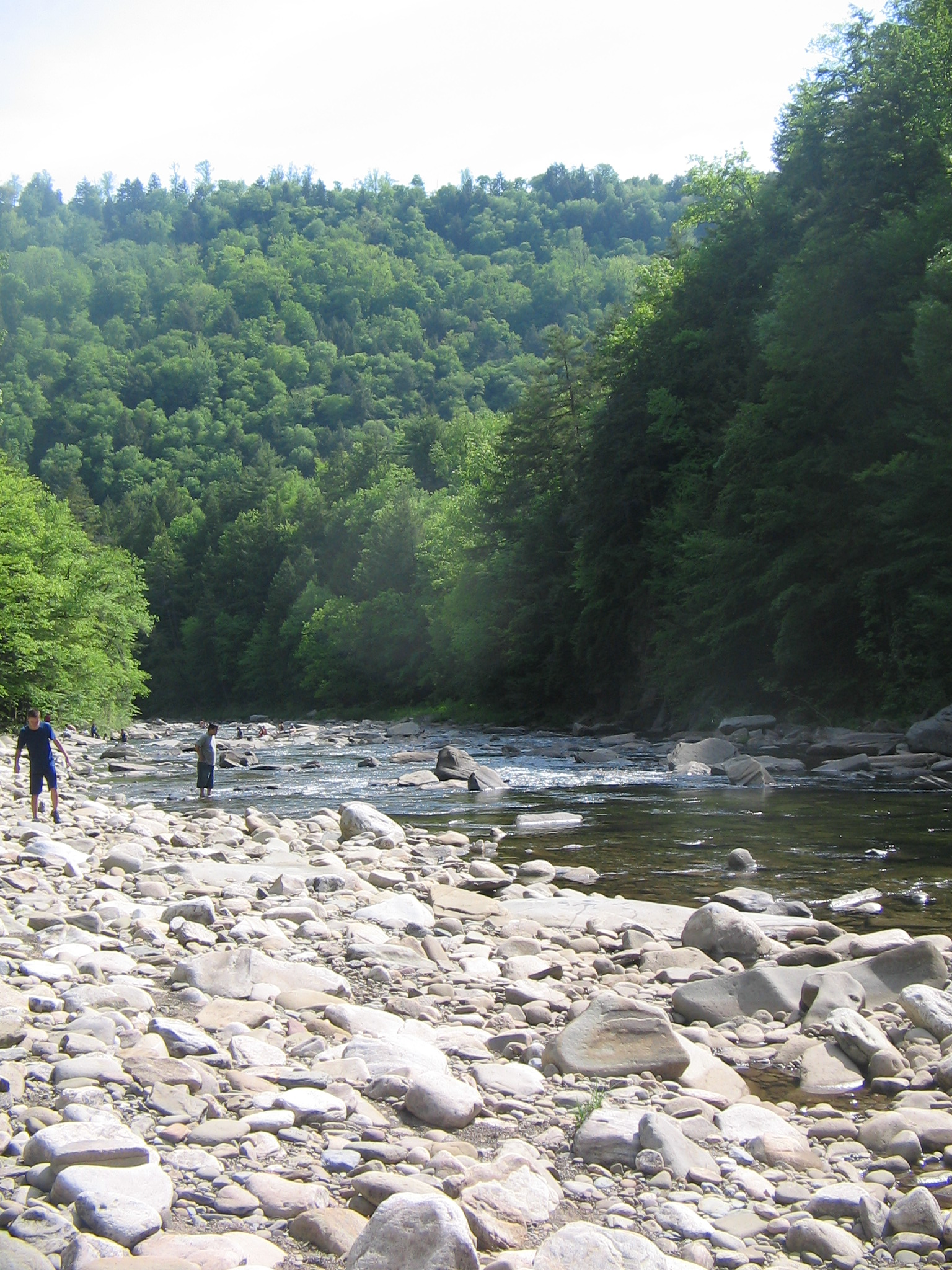
The forests in and around the park are second-growth, since the area was clearcut in the early 20th century.

The earliest settlers in the Worlds End area rode on two horse trails to traverse the rugged mountains between Muncy Creek and the confluence of Little Loyalsock Creek with Loyalsock Creek at Forksville. These rugged and rocky trails were used steadily until 1895, when Pennsylvania Route 154 was constructed to take their place. Part of these old horse trails are still in use and known as Pioneer Road and Double Run Road, and form part of two of the seven hiking trails in the park. Worlds End trail and Pioneer Road meet at the Worlds End Vista, which is thought to be a possible inspiration for the park's name.

Prior to the arrival of William Penn and his Quaker colonists in 1682, it has been estimated that up to 90 percent of what is now Pennsylvania was covered with woods: over 31,000 square miles (80,000 km^{2}) of white pine, eastern hemlock, and a mix of hardwoods. The forests near the three original counties, Philadelphia, Bucks, and Chester, were the first to be harvested, as the early settlers used the readily available timber to build homes, barns, and ships, and cleared the land for agriculture. The demand for lumber slowly increased and by the time of the American Revolution the lumber industry had reached the interior and mountainous regions of Pennsylvania.

Lumber thus became one of the leading industries in Pennsylvania. Trees were used to furnish fuel to heat homes, tannin for the many tanneries that were spread throughout the state, and wood for construction, furniture, and barrel making. Large areas of forest were harvested by colliers to fire iron furnaces. Rifle stocks and shingles were made from Pennsylvania timber, as were a wide variety of household utensils, and the first Conestoga wagons.

By the mid-19th century, the demand for lumber reached the area, where eastern white pine and eastern hemlock covered the surrounding mountainsides. Lumbermen came and harvested the trees and sent them down Loyalsock Creek to the West Branch Susquehanna River and to sawmills there. The old-growth forests of eastern white pine and eastern hemlock were soon clearcut and the hills were stripped bare. Nothing was left except the dried-out tree tops, which became a fire hazard, so much of the land burned and was left barren. In the 1920s a sawmill was built on land now in the park, and two more were located about 1 mile (1.6 km) south. After it was "thoroughly logged", the area became a tangle of briars and brush.

=== Civilian Conservation Corps ===
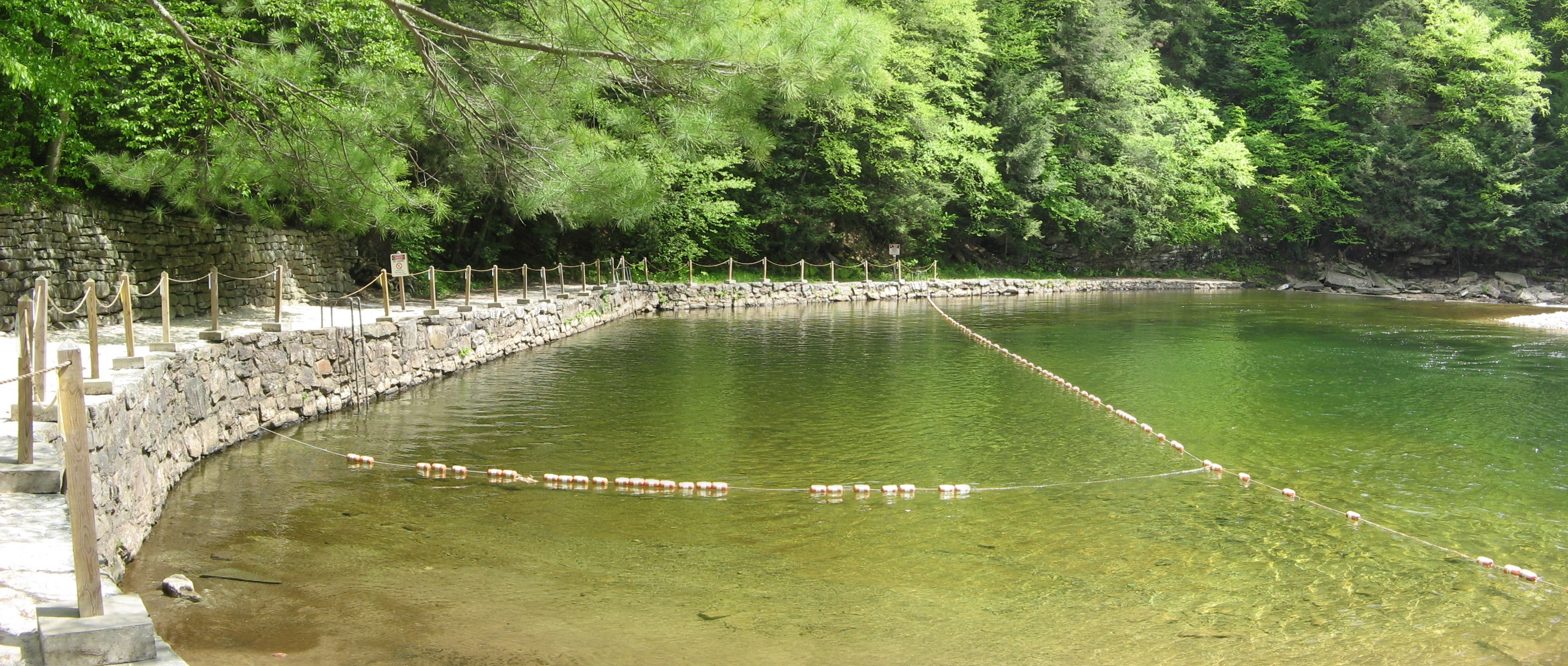
The swimming area in the creek was built by the CCC.

The history of Worlds End State Park goes back to 1929, when the Pennsylvania Department of Forests and Waters, a precursor to the modern Pennsylvania Department of Conservation and Natural Resources, began purchasing land devastated by logging and wild fire to create a state forest. The land that specifically became the park was purchased from the Central Pennsylvania Lumber Company in 1929 and Mrs. "Doc" Randall in 1931. Worlds End State Park was established by forest ranger John Annabelle in 1932, with a budget of $50 that purchased four picnic tables.

The Civilian Conservation Corps (CCC) was a work relief program for young men from unemployed families, established in 1933. As part of President Franklin D. Roosevelt's New Deal legislation, it was designed to combat unemployment during the Great Depression. The CCC operated in every U.S. state. The recreational development of the park began in 1933, when four CCC camps were built in Sullivan County. One of these, CCC Camp S-95, built many of the park facilities, such as the dam for the swimming area, the cabins, hiking trails and roads. The CCC workers blasted out bedrock in the creek for the swimming area and built the Canyon Vista road and lookout.

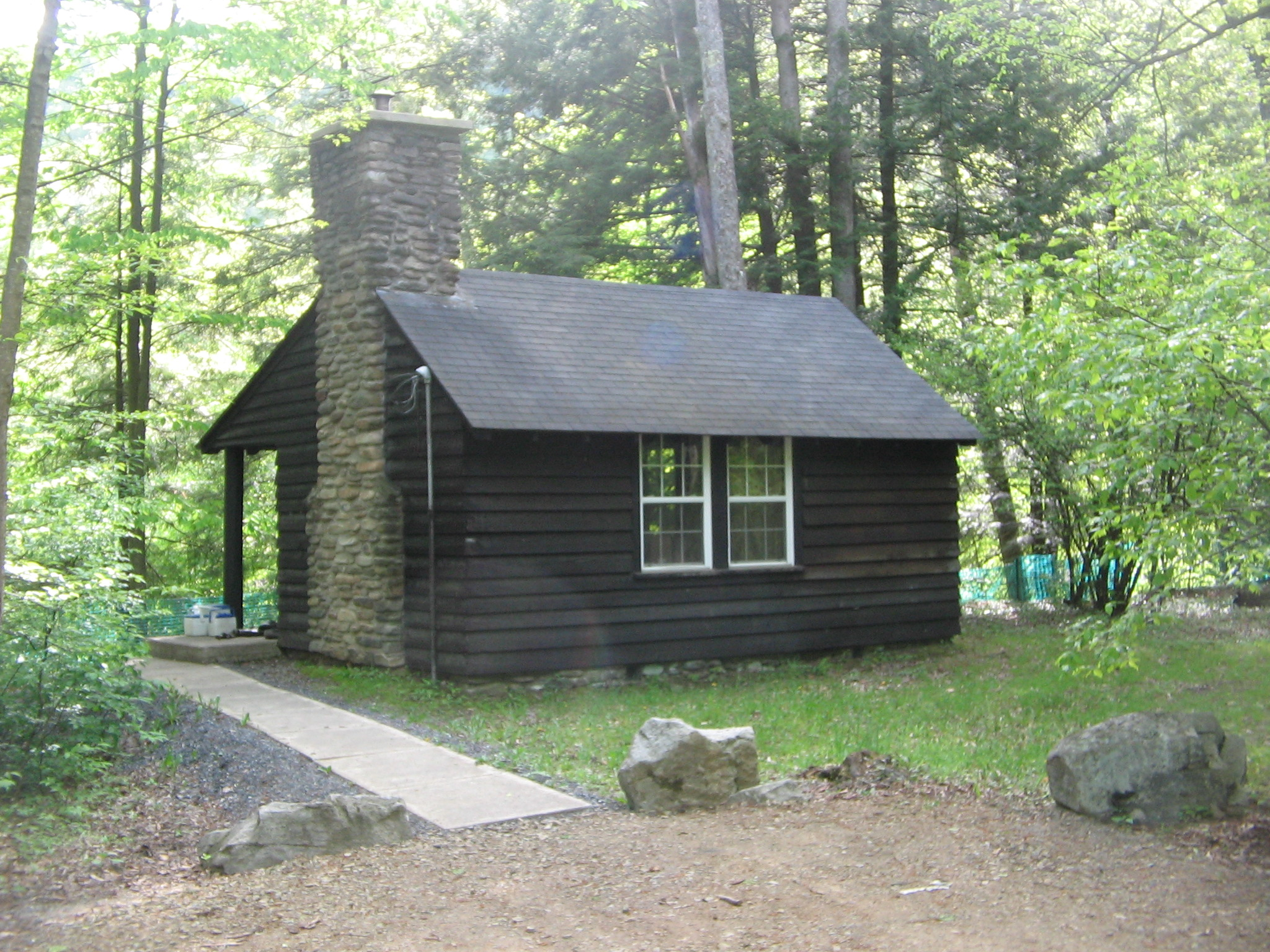
Cabin 14 in the park was built by the CCC and is part of the NRHP-listed Historic District.

CCC Camp S-95, which opened on May 29, 1933, on the site of an old lumber camp, was able to distinguish itself over the years it operated in Sullivan County. Two floods swept through the area in 1933 and 1936. The August flood of 1933 caused extensive damage and largely destroyed the newly built camp. During the course of the flooding two young men from Camp S-95 saved the lives of two drowning children at Worlds End State Park. The flood of 1936 covered a large area within the West Branch Susquehanna River Valley. The young men of the CCC camp were among the leaders in the cleaning up after the flood and rebuilding many destroyed bridges and roads. In 1936 the park was officially expanded beyond the original small picnic area. Camp S-95 closed in 1941.

==== Historic district ====
In 1987 the CCC architecture earned the Worlds End State Park Family Cabin District within the park a listing on the National Register of Historic Places (NRHP). The 18.4-acre (7.4 ha) historic district includes nineteen cabins and three latrines built by the CCC between 1933 and 1941. Seven of the cabins have one room, nine have two rooms, and three have three rooms. There are also three modern latrines within the district which are designated as non-contributing structures. The historic structures are examples of CCC work that reflects the standards set forth by the Department of the Interior. The cabins and latrines are constructed with native stones and timber and are placed on the land in a way that minimizes interference with the natural surroundings of the park.

=== Modern era ===
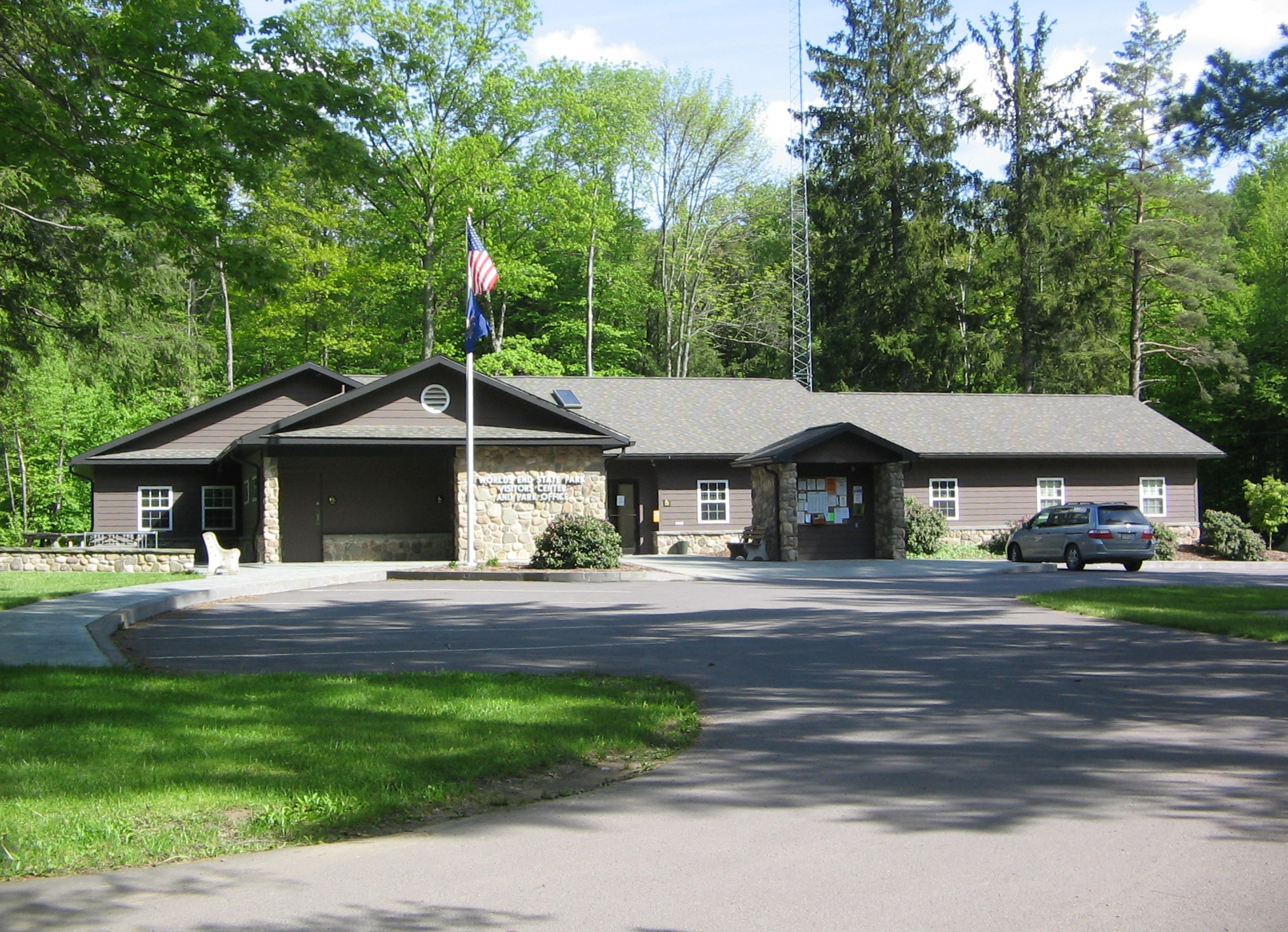
The Worlds End State Park office and visitor center, built in 2002

Since the CCC finished their work at the park in 1941, Worlds End State Park has continued to develop and change. In 1951 the Loyalsock Trail, which passes through the park, was laid out by Explorer Scouts. This trail has been maintained and extended by the Alpine Club of Williamsport since 1953. While the park was always popular in Pennsylvania, by the 1960s it began to attract attention from outside the state. The park was home to the first annual whitewater slalom race on Loyalsock Creek in 1964, which attracted over 100 competitors in 1965. A 1964 The New York Times article featured Worlds End park and its "excellent trout stream", and one in 1967 mentioned the park's "peerless wilderness views", "half-acre swimming pool carved into cool Loyalsock Creek" and "public campsites".

In 1980, a 900-square-foot (84 m^{2}) trailer was added as a temporary park office. The accomplishments of the CCC at Worlds End State Park were recognized in 1987 by the inclusion of the Family Cabin District on the NRHP. In 1997 the park's Important Bird Area (IBA) was one of the first 73 IBAs established in Pennsylvania. On November 12, 2002, a new 4,300-square-foot (399 m^{2}) visitor center and park office was dedicated, which included 1,680 square feet (156 m^{2}) of public space for environmental education and public programs. The building, constructed with an "energy-efficient design and recycled materials", was part of a $1.1 million project that included the park's first flush toilets and sewage treatment plant. In 2003 a $2.7 million project added flush toilets and running water to all the park's wash-houses, renovated the cabins, and made major improvements in the day use area.

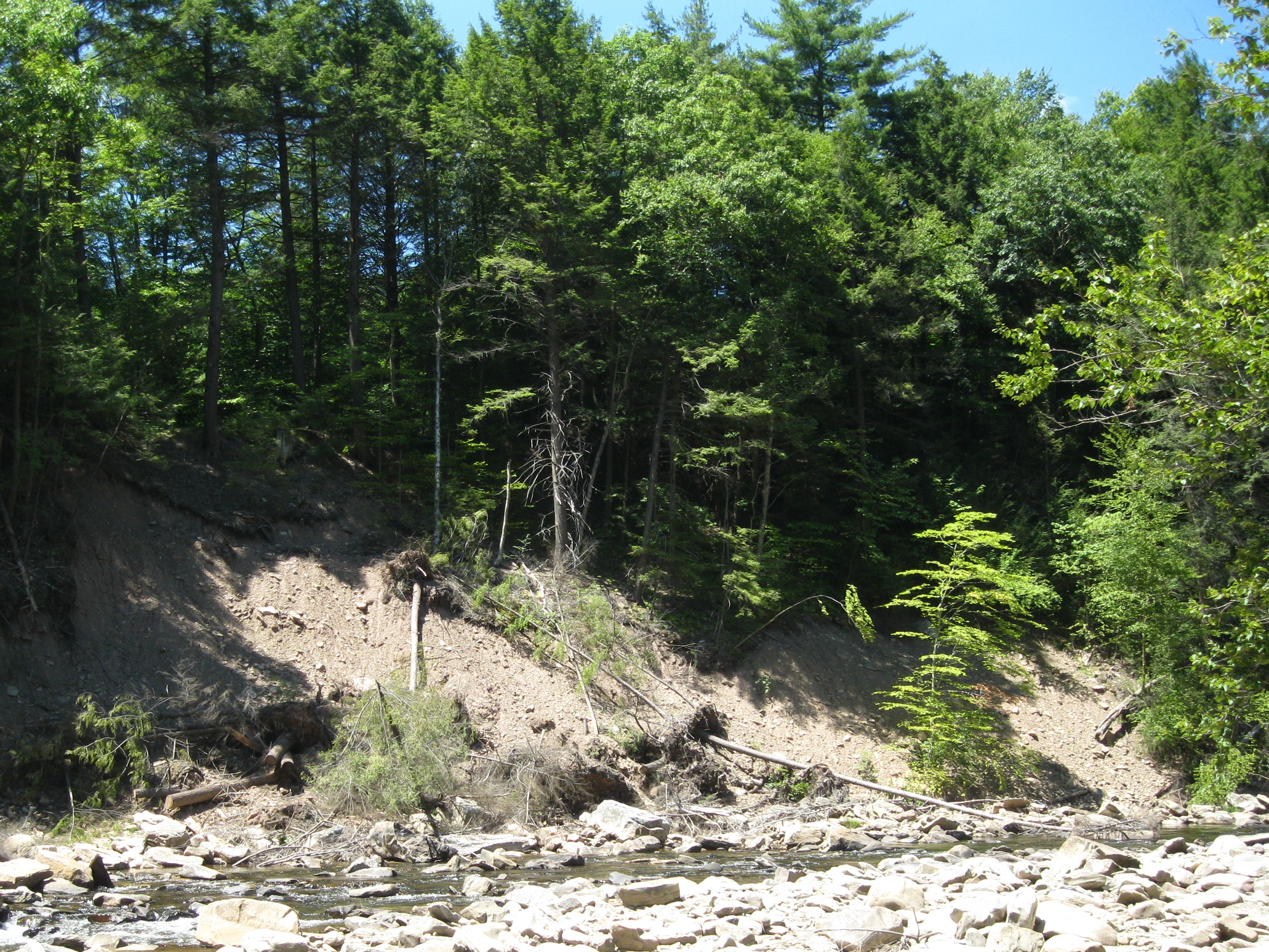
Landslides and erosion along Loyalsock Creek in the park after Hurricane Irene and Tropical Storm Lee flooding

In 2004, the Loyalsock Creek Watershed Association installed a fence on the creek's banks near the cabins to limit pedestrian access and erosion. The association planted shrubs and trees in the same area to stabilize the creek's banks in 2008, and in September 2010 replaced more than 1,500 feet (460 m) of fence with a less visible version. On January 25, 2010, flooding caused by heavy rain and melt from 20 inches (510 mm) of snow "washed out a bridge" leading to the cabin area and destroyed 86 feet (26 m) of road there, leaving the park looking like "the set of disaster movie". The cabin area road needed $72,120 in repairs, the park was not fully restored until Memorial Day. Two floods hit the park in 2011, the first from Hurricane Irene on August 29, and the second from Tropical Storm Lee on September 8. Lee washed away about 20 to 22 short tons (18 to 20 t) of gravel used to make emergency repairs to roads in the park from Irene damage. Loyalsock Creek reached 20.4 feet (6.2 m) south of the park, and campers in the park had to be evacuated. Worlds End and Promised Land State Park had "significant damage to roads and bridges", damage to Loylasock State Forest roads was also heavy, and the DCNR estimated the two storms caused $3 to $4 million of damage to its forests and parks. Worlds End was closed for two weeks after the Lee flood.

As of 2012, post-war facilities include the park office, five wash-houses and other modern restroom facilities, beach house with concession stand, chapel, amphitheater, and modern camping areas. Worlds End State Park is one of twenty-one chosen by the Pennsylvania Bureau of Parks for its "Twenty Must-See Pennsylvania State Parks" list. The DCNR describes it as "[v]irtually in a class by itself, this wild, rugged and rustic area seems almost untamed". It goes on to praise the opportunities for camping and hiking at the park, and its scenery and vistas.

== Geology, paleontology, and Marcellus shale ==
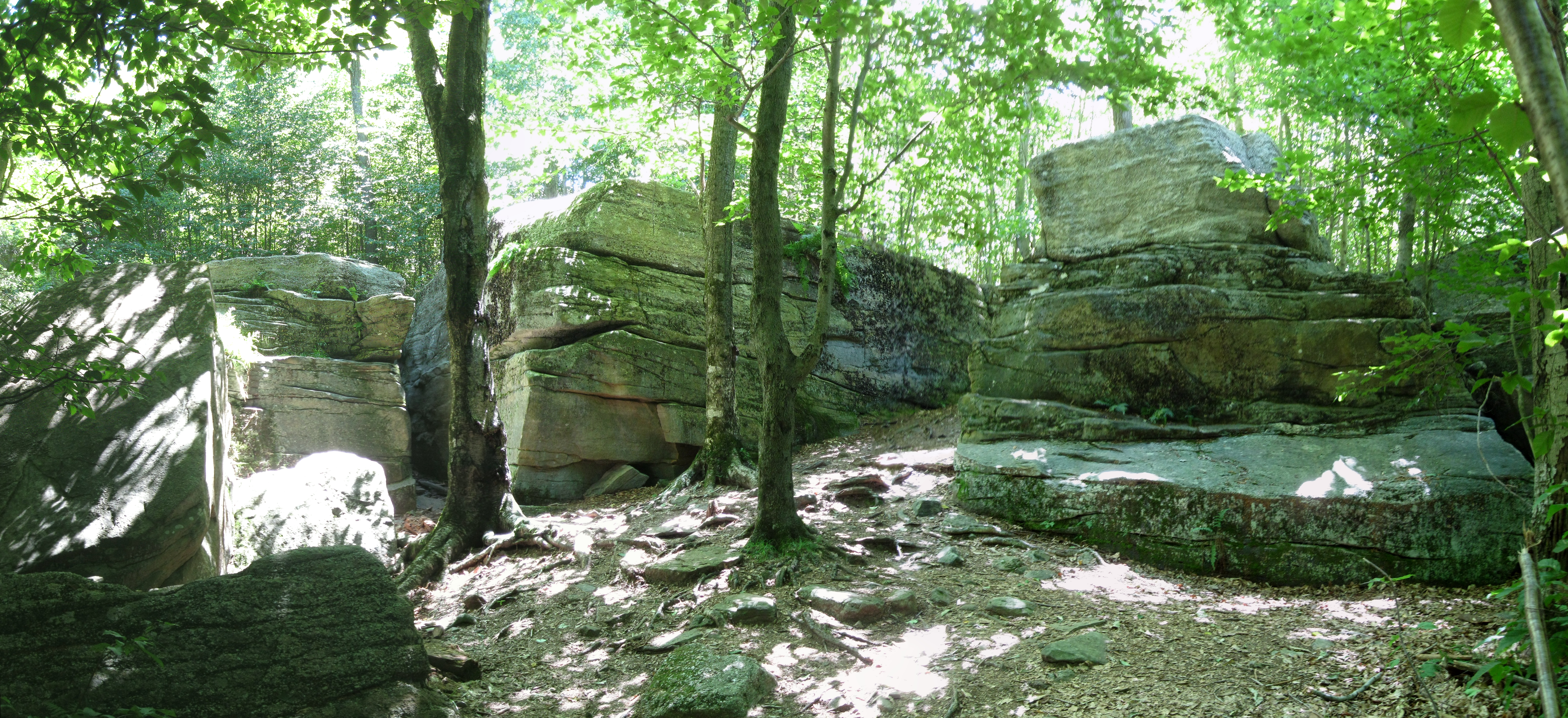
The Rock Garden near Canyon Vista, formed by frost wedging making crevices in the rock

The land on which Worlds End State Park sits has undergone tremendous change over the last 350 million years. It was once part of the coastline of a shallow sea that covered a great portion of what is now North America. The high mountains to the east of the sea gradually eroded, causing a buildup of sediment made up primarily of clay, sand and gravel. Tremendous pressure on the sediment caused the formation of the rocks that are found today in the Loyalsock Creek drainage basin: sandstone, shale, conglomerates, coal, and limestone.

Four major rock formations are present in Worlds End State Park, all at least partly from the Carboniferous period. The youngest of these, which forms the highest points in the park, is the early Pennsylvanian Pottsville Formation, a gray conglomerate that may contain sandstone, siltstone, and shale, as well as anthracite coal. The Loyalsock gorge rim and the upper part of its walls are the late Mississippian Mauch Chunk Formation, which is formed with grayish-red shale, siltstone, sandstone, and conglomerate. Below this is the Mississippian Burgoon Formation, which comprises buff-colored sandstone and conglomerate. The creek bed and base of the gorge walls are the late Devonian and early Mississippian Huntley Mountain Formation, which is made of relatively soft grayish-red shale and olive-gray sandstone.

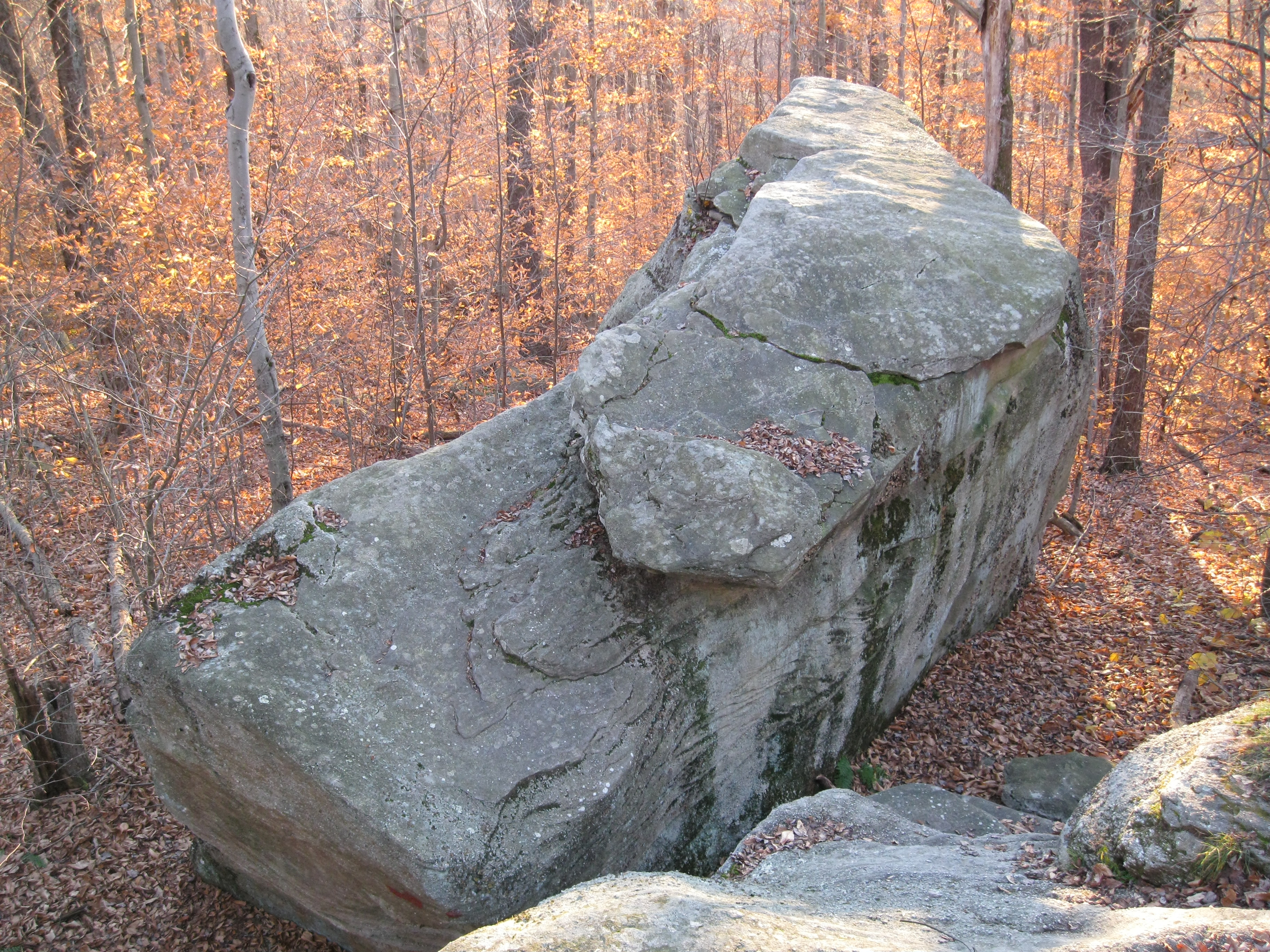
A boulder of Pottsville Formation conglomerate in the Rock Garden

The park is at an elevation of 1,175 feet (358 m) on the Allegheny Plateau, which formed in the Alleghenian orogeny some 300 million years ago, when Gondwana (specifically what became Africa) and what became North America collided, forming Pangaea. The local region is known as the Endless Mountains, but despite the name these are not true mountains: instead millions of years of erosion have made this a dissected plateau, causing the "mountainous" terrain seen today. The hardest of the ancient rocks are on top of the ridges, while the softer rocks eroded away forming the valleys: the Loyalsock gorge is approximately 800 feet (244 m) deep in the park. Loyalsock Creek and its tributaries have been a primary force in the creation of the valleys, as the creek makes its way across the landscape to its mouth at the West Branch Susquehanna River in Montoursville.

Fossils have been found in Worlds End State Park, as the area was once a river delta on an ancient coastline. This coast was home to an ancient ancestor of the lungfish, which would burrow in the mud to survive dry spells. Fossils of these burrows have been discovered in the red siltstone formations in and near the park.

The Marcellus Formation, a shale rich in natural gas, lies thousands of feet below Worlds End State Park and much of Pennsylvania. As of June 30, 2012, there were 127 active gas wells in Sullivan County, with 14 of those in Forks or Shrewsbury Townships. The state did not purchase the mineral rights to much of the land it owns. Anadarko Petroleum (now Occidental Petroleum) owns the mineral rights under the [Loyalsock] state forest and plans to drill in it. About 80% of the mineral rights to its state parks are not owned by Pennsylvania, and the owner of Worlds End State Park's mineral rights is unknown. According to William Kocher, Worlds End's manager, "if the owner decided to drill [in the park] ... the state would have no right to say no." Natural gas pipeline construction upstream of the park spilled a "significant amount" of sediment and mud into Loyalsock Creek in September 2012.

=== Climate ===
The Allegheny Plateau has a continental climate, with occasional severe low temperatures in winter and average daily temperature ranges of 20 °F (11 °C) in winter and 80 °F (14 °C) in summer. For the region the park is in, the average minimum temperature in January is 10 °F (−12 °C), while the average maximum temperature in July is 75 °F (24 °C). The mean annual precipitation for Loyalsock Creek is 42 to 48 inches (1067 to 1219 mm). Pennsylvania receives the most acid rain of any state in the United States. Because Loyalsock Creek is in a sandstone, shale, conglomerates, coal, and limestone mountain region, it has a relatively low capacity to neutralize added acid. This makes it especially vulnerable to increased acidification from acid rain, which poses a threat to the long-term health of the plants and animals in the creek. The highest recorded temperature at the park was 104 °F (40 °C) in 1936, and the record low was −27 °F (−33 °C) in 1994. On average, July is the hottest month at Worlds End, January is the coldest, and June the wettest.

Climate data for Worlds End State Park
Month	Jan	Feb	Mar	Apr	May	Jun	Jul	Aug	Sep	Oct	Nov	Dec	Year
Mean daily maximum °F (°C)	32 (0)	36 (2)	44 (7)	58 (14)	68 (20)	76 (24)	81 (27)	79 (26)	71 (22)	60 (16)	48 (9)	37 (3)	58 (14)
Mean daily minimum °F (°C)	14 (−10)	16 (−9)	23 (−5)	33 (1)	42 (6)	52 (11)	56 (13)	55 (13)	47 (8)	35 (2)	29 (−2)	20 (−7)	35 (2)
Average precipitation inches (mm)	2.59 (66)	2.26 (57)	3.15 (80)	3.58 (91)	3.42 (87)	4.22 (107)	3.66 (93)	3.63 (92)	3.90 (99)	3.49 (89)	3.38 (86)	2.89 (73)	40.17 (1,020)
Source: The Weather Channel

== Ecology ==
Worlds End State Park is near Forksville on Pennsylvania Route 154 in the narrow, serpentine valley of Loyalsock Creek. It is nearly surrounded by Loyalsock State Forest, which was known here as Wyoming State Forest until July 1, 2005. Common trees found in the state park and forest include black cherry, eastern hemlock, red maple, tulip poplar, yellow birch, and white ash. The northern hardwood and hemlock forests are threatened in general by deer overgrazing, while the woolly adelgid, an invasive hemiptera, threatens the hemlock populations. In 2010 Worlds End was part of over 2,600 acres (1,100 ha) of state forests and parks combating the woolly adelgid with a $110,000 federal grant to the DCNR's "Forest Pest Management Division for insecticide treatment of high-value Eastern hemlocks". Several different interpretive and educational programs on environmental and ecological topics are offered at the park each summer.

=== Wildlife and Important Bird Area ===
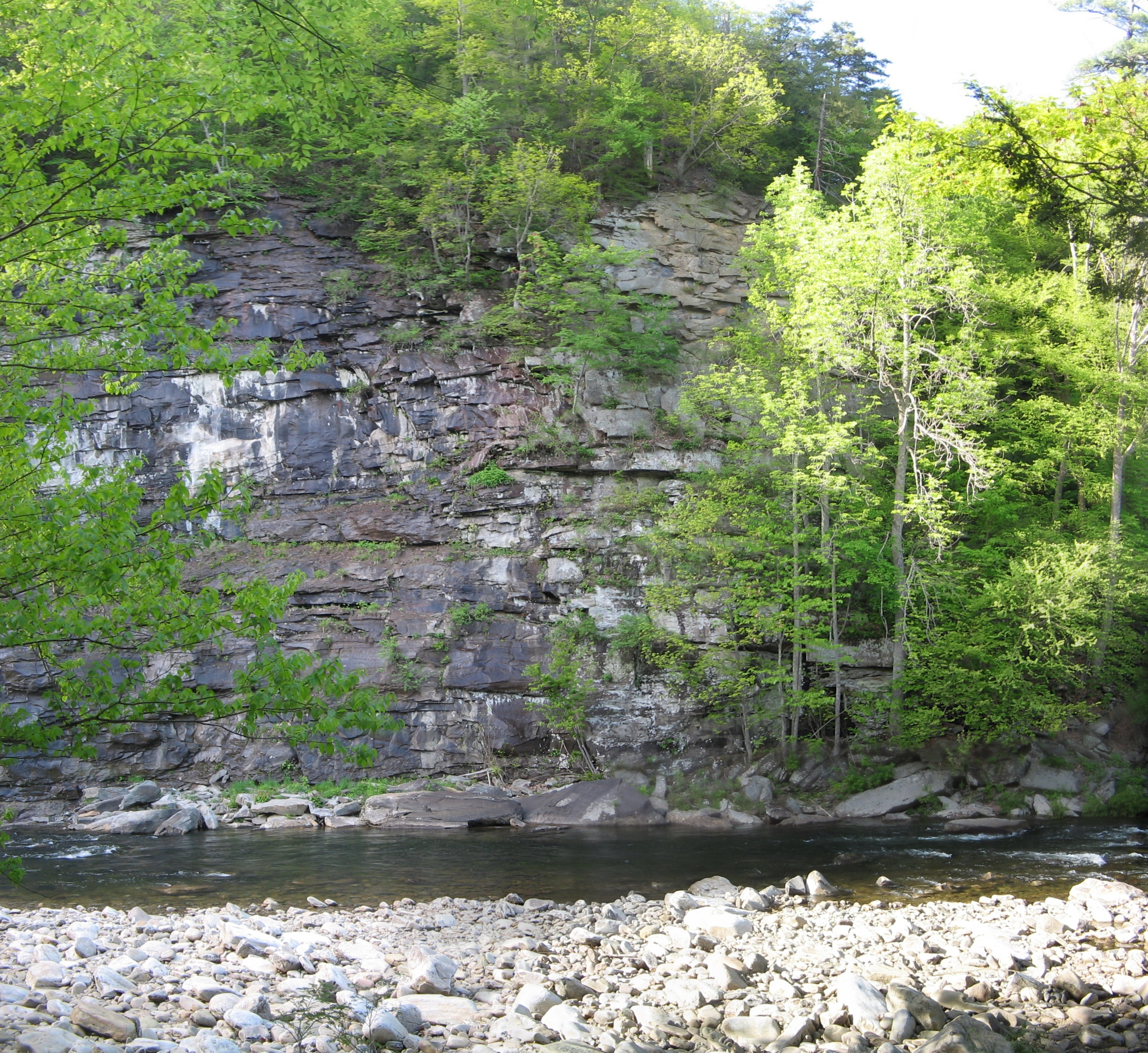
The creek and its valley and the surrounding plateau support many different plant and animal species.

Worlds End State Park has an extensive forest cover of hemlock-filled valleys and hardwood tree-covered mountains, which makes it a habitat for "big woods" wildlife. Animals such as white-tailed deer, black bear, wild turkey, red and gray squirrels are seen fairly regularly. Less commonly seen but present in the park are creatures such as bobcats, coyote, fishers, river otters, and timber rattlesnakes. Loyalsock Creek is home to native brook trout and black bass which feed on a variety of insects including mosquitos, dragonflies, and gnats.

Bird watchers have observed over 200 species of birds in the park, including the great blue heron, northern harrier, white-throated sparrow and highly sensitive species which are rare as breeding birds in Pennsylvania such as northern goshawk and yellow-bellied flycatcher. The state park and forest are part of the larger Pennsylvania Important Bird Area (IBA) #42, which encompasses 214,839 acres (86,942 ha). The Pennsylvania Audubon Society has designated the IBA as a globally important habitats for the conservation of bird populations. The IBA is home to Swainson's thrush and ruffed grouse, the state bird of Pennsylvania. Other notable passerine species found in the park and IBA include blue-headed and red-eyed vireos, Acadian and least flycatchers. Breeding warblers in the park include both northern and Louisiana waterthrushes, as well as Blackburnian, black-throated blue, black-throated green, Canada, magnolia, mourning, Nashville, and yellow-rumped.

Worlds End State Park is featured in the Audubon Society's Susquehanna River Birding and Wildlife Trail Guide. Birds of interest in the park include common mergansers along the creek and other riparian species such as belted kingfisher, as well as barred, great horned, and the scarce, elusive northern saw-whet owls. Other avian species seen in the park and believed to nest there include tufted titmouse, brown creeper, red-breasted nuthatch, common raven, scarlet tanager, yellow-bellied sapsucker, and winter wren. These bird populations are typical of "mature northern hardwood-hemlock forests and high elevation swamps and conifer swamps".

== Recreation ==
=== Trails ===
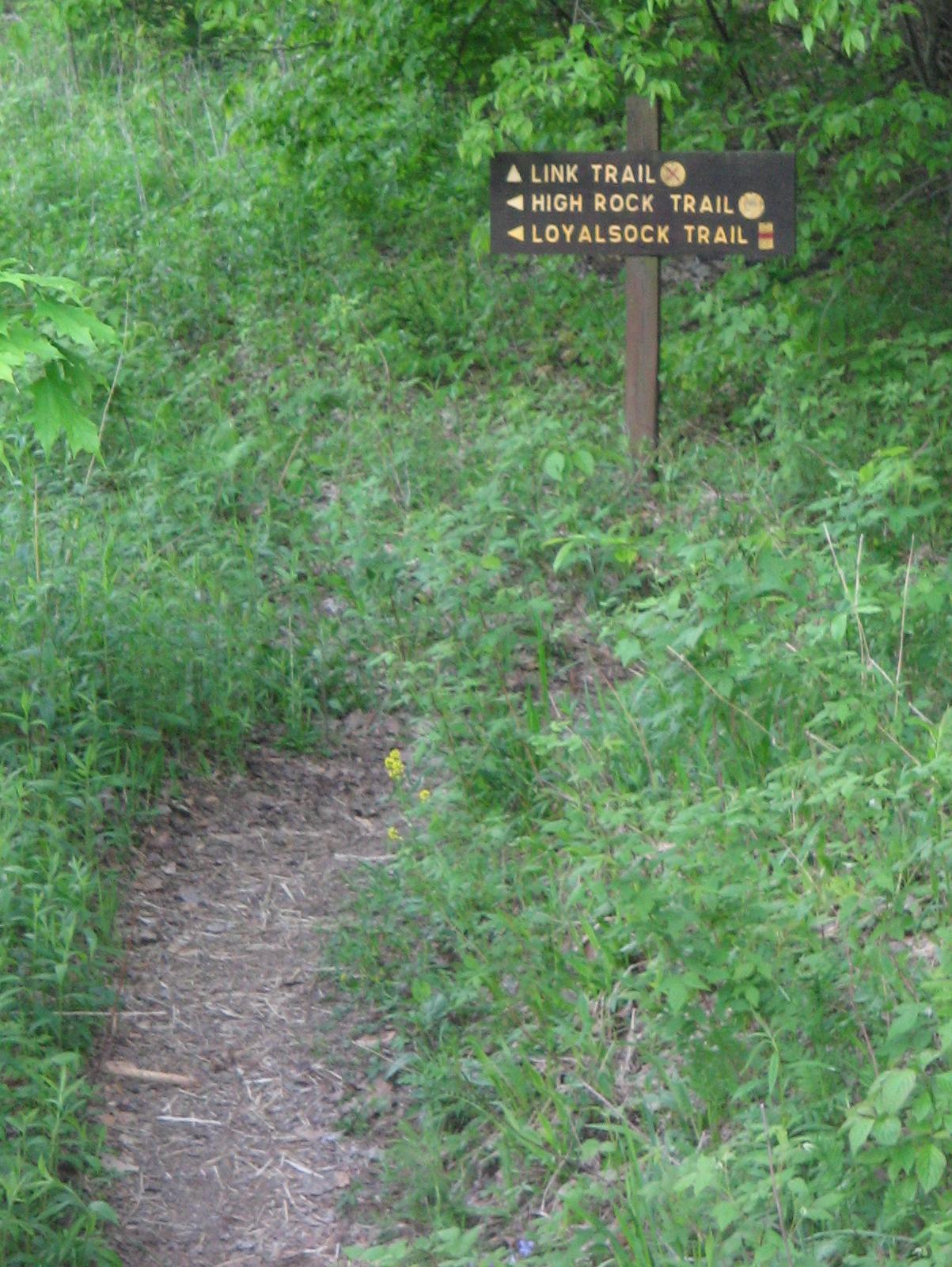
Sign at the junction of the Link, High Rock, and Loyalsock Trails, showing their blazes

There are over 20 miles (32 km) of hiking trails at Worlds End State Park. Most of the trails are rocky and steep, so hikers are encouraged to wear proper footgear and to be prepared for icy conditions during the cold winter months. As John Young writes in Hike Pennsylvania, "If you want to do some hiking in the Worlds End region, you should know that hiking here means climbing". Worlds End State Park is open during the winter months for snowmobiling and cross-country skiing. Most of the trails are too steep or rugged for either activity, but the park roads are open, as are trails on surrounding state forest lands.

- Loyalsock Trail, often abbreviated LT, is a rugged 59.28-mile (95.40 km) hiking trail that stretches from near Loyalsockville, in Lycoming County on Pennsylvania Route 87 to north of Laporte in Sullivan County, just off U.S. Route 220. This trail follows the ridges and streams of the Loyalsock Creek watershed. The trail is primarily within the boundaries of Loyalsock State Forest and uses some old logging roads and abandoned railroad grades. The Loyalsock Trail was originally blazed in a yellow rectangle with a red stripe, and red can lids with a yellow "LT". Recently, the trail markers have been changed to a yellow disc with a red "LT".
- Link Trail is a moderate 8.5-mile (13.7 km) trail marked with a red X on a yellow circle blaze. The trail starts at the Cabin Bridge in the park and follows Loyalsock Creek before it branches off and follows Double Run. The trail then ascends to Canyon Vista and heads out into Loyalsock State Forest where it links up with the Loyalsock Trail at the 55.33-mile (89.05 km) post. The Loyalsock Trail can be followed back for a 17.62 miles (28.36 km) long loop.
- Canyon Vista Trail is a 3.5-mile (5.6 km) loop trail with blue blazes that passes through the eastern portion of the park and a stand of ash, sugar maple, and black cherry trees. This trail passes a maze-like jumble of blocky Pottsville Formation rocks known as the Rock Garden, adjacent to Canyon Vista. The vista is at an elevation of 1,750 feet (530 m) and "rewards the hiker with a spectacular view of the Loyalsock Creek gorge".

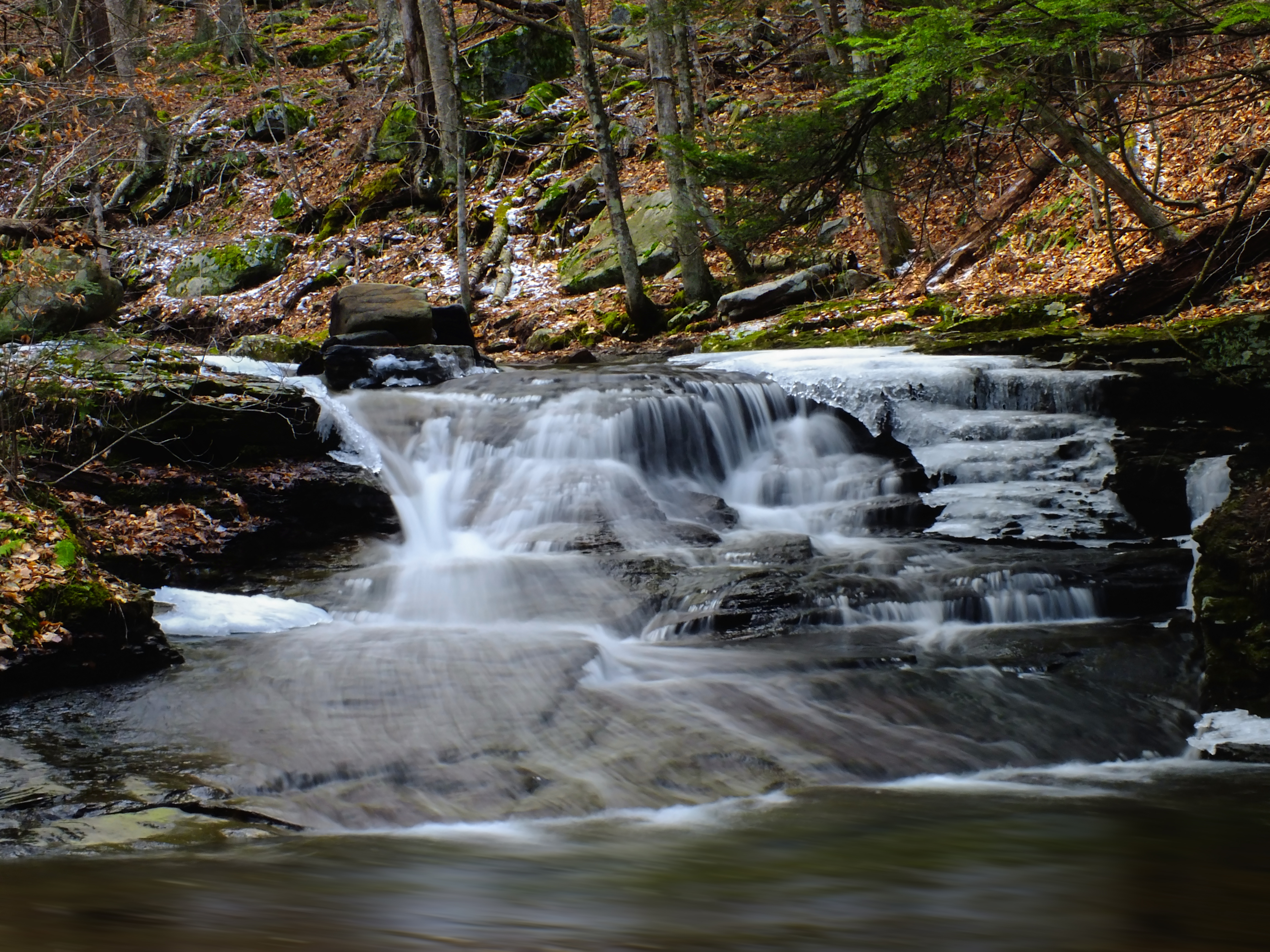
Double Run waterfall from the nature trail

- Worlds End Trail is a 3.25-mile (5.23 km) trail with yellow blazes that begins at the park office and ascends to an overlook of the swimming area. It then crosses the old Pioneer Road, which was used by some of the first settlers to the area, and enters the Loyalsock State Forest, ending at the 37.77-mile (60.78 km) post of the Loyalsock Trail, which can be followed back to the park office to make a loop 11.5 miles (18.5 km) long.
- Butternut Trail is a 2.5-mile (4.0 km) trail marked with orange blazes that loops through a hardwood forest and crosses over Butternut Run. Two side trails connect Butternut Trail with the Loyalsock Trail.
- Double Run Nature Trail is an easy 1.2-mile (1.9 km) trail, marked with a green stripe on a white rectangle blaze, that loops through woodlands along the west branch of Double Run. Wildflowers like Jack-in-the-pulpit, Solomon's seal and wild ginger can be seen on this trail, which passes by an intermittent waterfall.
- High Rock Trail is 1.0 mile (1.6 km) and passes a waterfall on High Rock Run. This steep trail is marked with red blazes and climbs a hollow filled with lichen-covered rocks to a vista. A part of this trail used to pass so close to cliffs that two hikers fell to their deaths; this part of the trail has been relocated for safety.

=== Fishing, hunting, and whitewater ===
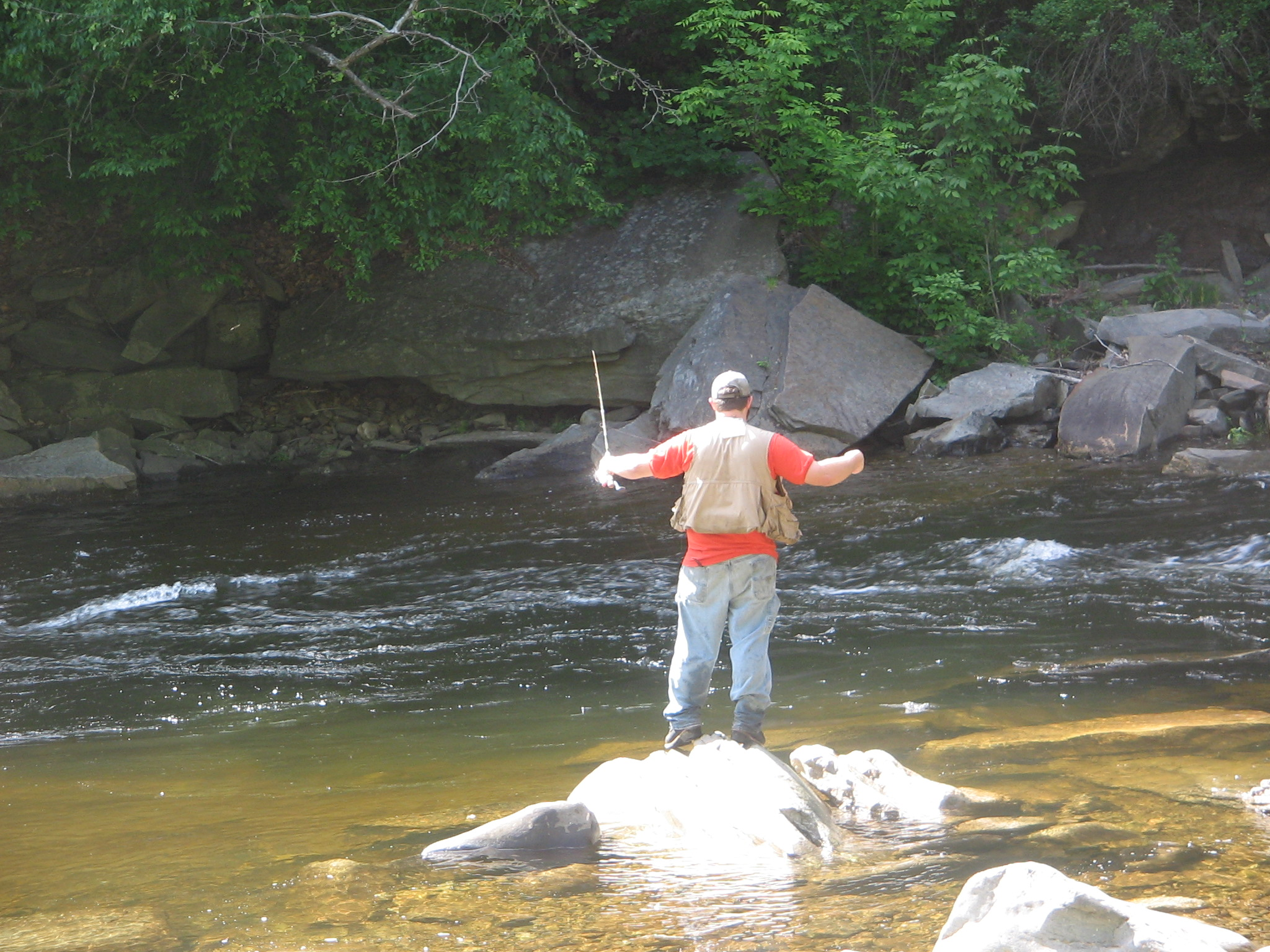
An angler fishing for trout on Loyalsock Creek, upstream of the dam in the park

According to John Young, "As soon as you enter Worlds End State Park, you hear it: the never-ending rush of the waters of Loyalsock Creek". The creek and its tributary Double Run have been designated as approved trout waters within the park by the Pennsylvania Fish and Boat Commission. This means the waters will be stocked with trout and may be fished during trout season. Hunting is permitted on about half of the lands of Worlds End State Park. Hunters are expected to follow the rules and regulations of the Pennsylvania Game Commission. The common game species are ruffed grouse, eastern gray squirrels, turkey, white-tailed deer and bears; however, the hunting of groundhogs is prohibited.

Edward Gertler, author of Keystone Canoeing, writes that Loyalsock Creek's "exciting whitewater, above Forksville, has long been a favorite of paddlers who are quick and tolerant enough to endure its fickle water levels and weather". This is the stretch of the creek in and near the park, whose "long, steepening, and complex boulder patch and ledgy rapids demand your attention ... A boater's chute through the middle of the swimming area dam at Worlds End State Park climaxes this run".

The best time for whitewater boating on Loyalsock Creek at Worlds End State Park is from March to May, and the park hosts a slalom race on Loyalsock Creek each spring. The whitewater gradient is 41 for the section of the creek in and near the park, and its rating on the International Scale of River Difficulty is II to III+, with sections reaching IV. The water is too swift for open canoes, so visitors are asked to use kayaks. The swimming area is closed to whitewater boating during the summer months.

=== Cabins, camping, swimming, and picnics ===
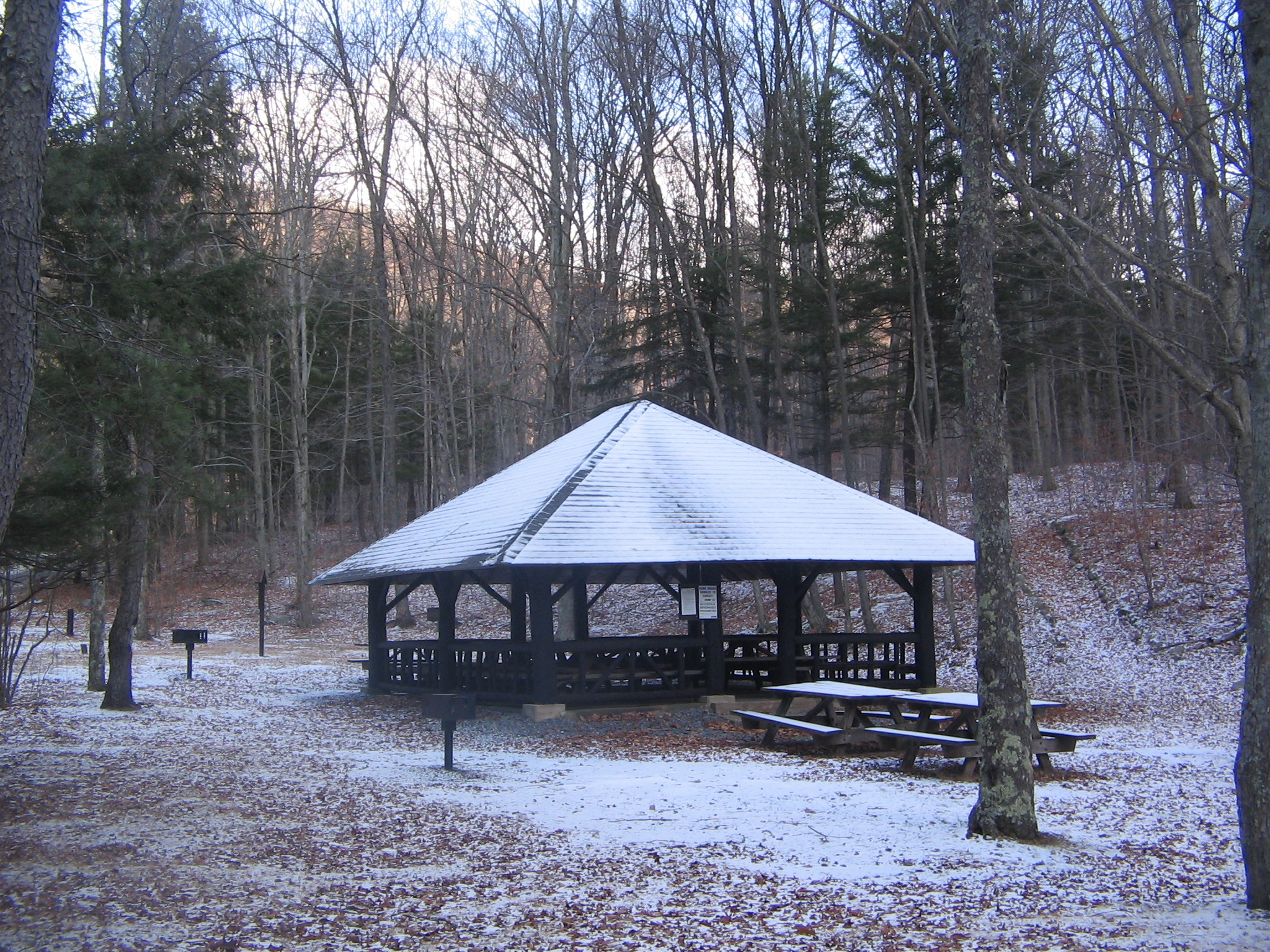
One of the park's many picnic pavilions in winter

When appointed as manager of the park in 2002, William C. Kocher said "Camping really is king here at Worlds End, and the rustic cabins are especially popular ... We also have plenty of picnics and reunions, many of them drawing generation after generation, year after year". Worlds End State Park has three options for visitors interested in staying overnight. There are 19 rustic cabins, each with a refrigerator, stove, fireplace, table with chairs, and beds. There is a 70-site tent and camper campground along Pennsylvania Route 154. Some of the campsites have an electric hook-up, and there is a central shower facility with water and restrooms located nearby. Three organized group tenting areas, each capable of accommodating 30 people, are also available north of the cabins. They may also be used for one large group of up to 90 campers. Non-denominational Christian worship services, sponsored by the Pennsylvania Council of Churches, are held in a wooded chapel at the park on Sunday mornings during the summer.

The picnic and swimming areas are adjacent to each other, with the building housing the bath house and concession stand between them. There are many picnic tables and several pavilions available for day use by visitors to the park. During the Great Depression the Civilian Conservation Corps built a 7-foot (2.1 m) tall dam on Loyalsock Creek, which provides a 1 acre (0.40 ha) swimming area at Worlds End State Park. Since 2008, lifeguards are no longer on duty at the park.

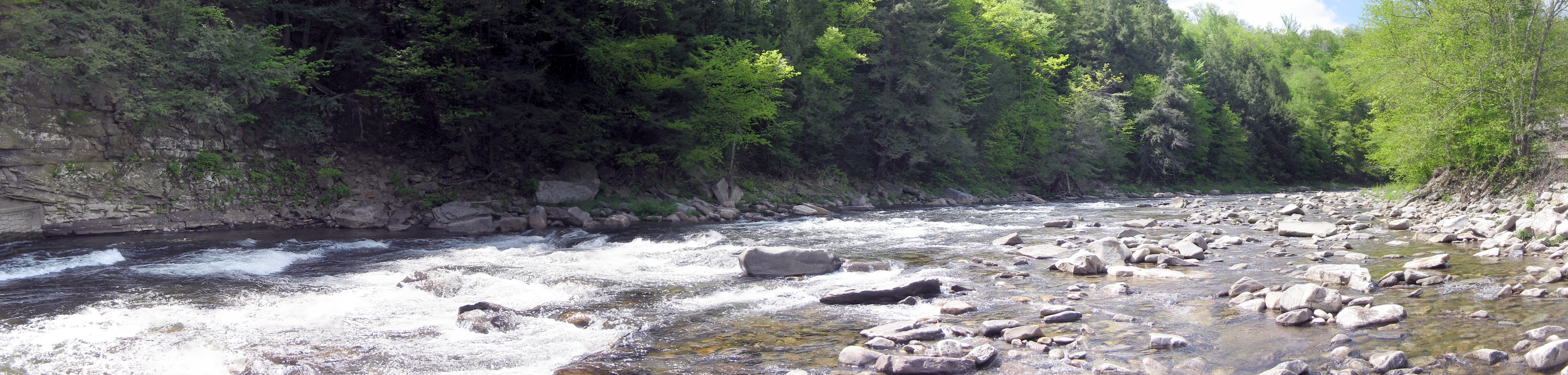
Panoramic view of Loyalsock Creek in Worlds End State Park, just upstream of the Pennsylvania Route 154 bridge
