= Hill Grove School =

- U.S. National Register of Historic Places
- Virginia Landmarks Register
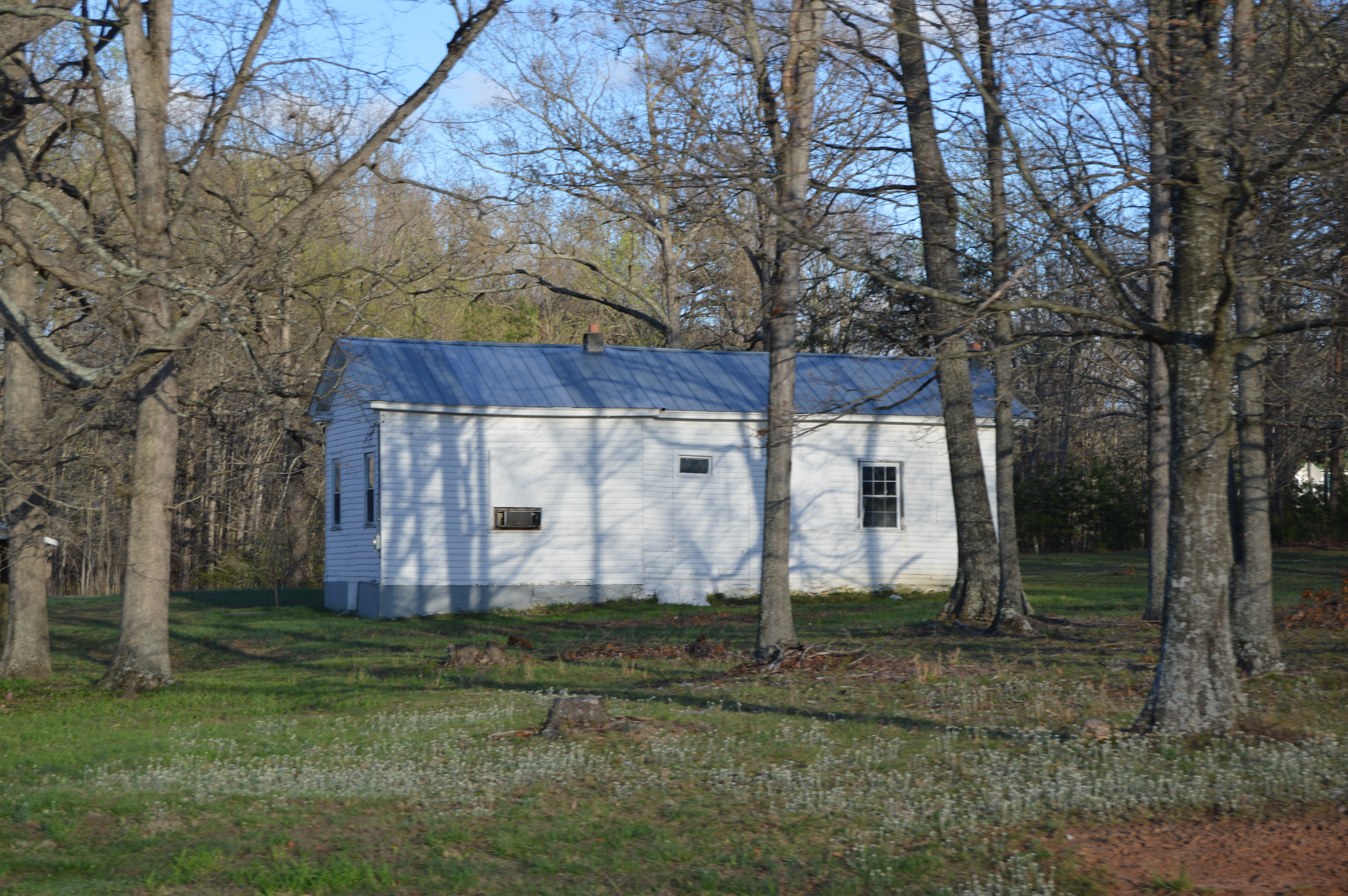
- Western side

- Location within Virginia Location within the United States
- Location: 2580 Wards Rd., Hurt, Virginia
- Coordinates: 37°04′04″N 79°14′57″W
- Area: 1 acre (0.40 ha)
- Built: 1915
- NRHP reference No.: 04000104
- VLR No.: 071-5187

Significant dates
- Added to NRHP: February 25, 2004
- Designated VLR: December 3, 2003

Hill Grove School is a historic school for African American children located at Hurt, Pittsylvania County, Virginia. It was built in 1915, and is a small, simple single-story, weatherboarded, light-frame building on a fieldstone foundation, with a low-pitched side-gable roof. It features a single-bay, tin-covered, shed roof porch supported by two-by-four lumber over the entrance. The school closed in the early 1960s.

It was listed on the National Register of Historic Places in 2004.
