= Loyalsock Trail =

Hiking trail in Pennsylvania

Coordinates: 41°25′03″N 76°36′39″W

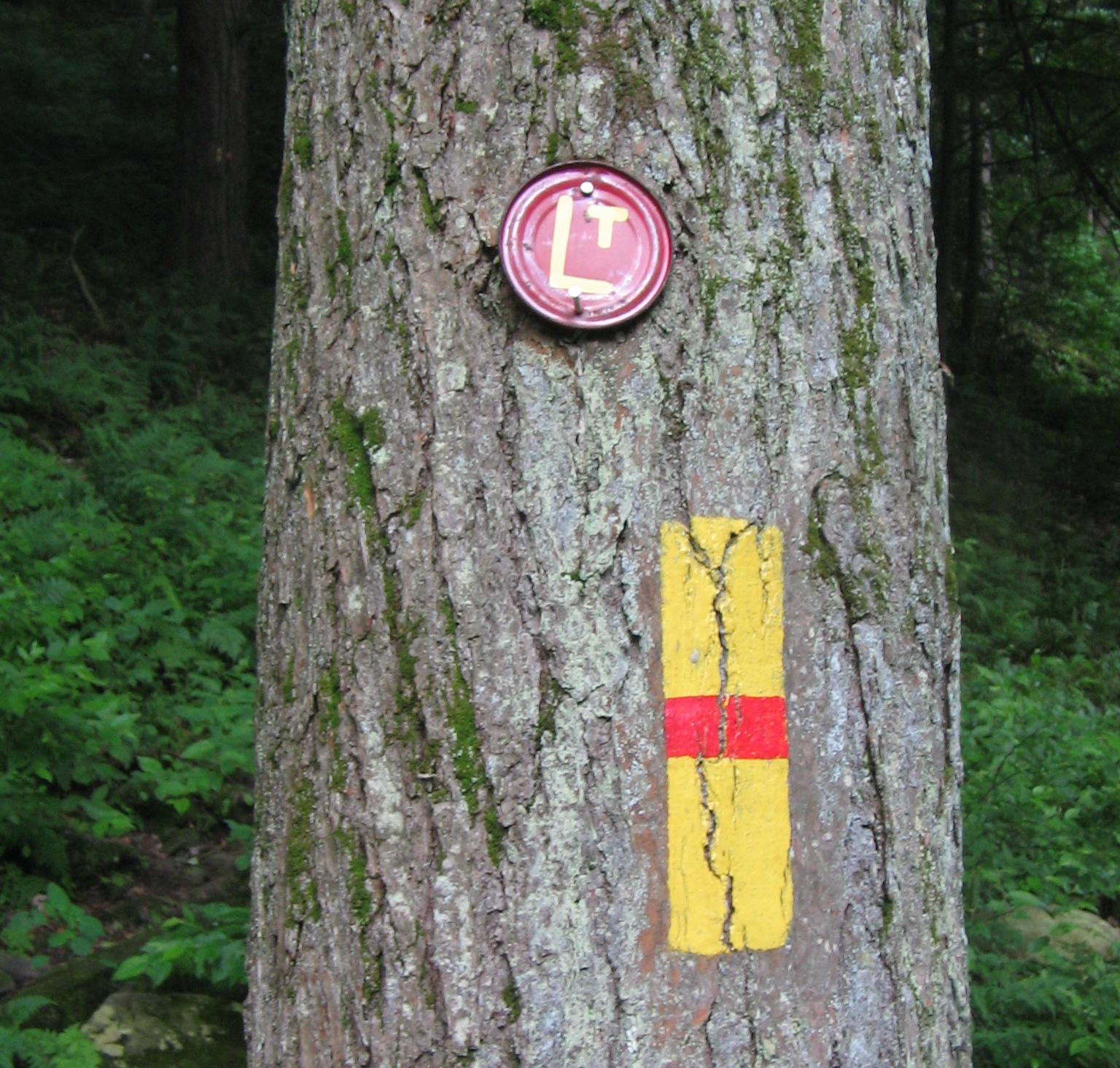
- The Loyalsock Trail's distinctive blazes
- Length: 59.2 mi (95.3 km)
- Location: Lycoming County and Sullivan County, Pennsylvania, US
- Trailheads: West: Pennsylvania Route 87 north of Montoursville; East: Meade Road near Laporte
- Use: Hiking
- Highest point: 2,140 ft (650 m)
- Lowest point: 665 ft (203 m)
- Difficulty: Strenuous
- Season: Year-round
- Hazards: Uneven and wet terrain, rattlesnakes, mosquitoes, ticks, black bears

The Loyalsock Trail (LT) is a 59.2 mi (95.3 km) linear hiking trail in Lycoming and Sullivan counties in north-central Pennsylvania. It is roughly parallel to Loyalsock Creek and traverses rugged lands mostly in Loyalsock State Forest. The trail is maintained by the Alpine Club of Williamsport and has been known for its distinctive blazes, made from the tops of tin cans and painted a distinctive color with "LT" in the center. Many of these are still present but some have given way to painted yellow blazes with a red stripe in the center. The Loyalsock Trail is also the main artery in a network of associated trails called "Red X" trails for alternate routes, plus blue-blazed spur trails to nearby roads and white-blazed side trails to various points of interest.

The Loyalsock Trail was first laid out in 1951 by Troop 10 of the Explorer Scouts of the Boy Scouts of America from Williamsport, and has been expanded several times since. Much of the trail follows old logging railroad grades, and one section follows the Towanda Path used by Native Americans. Due to its many mountaintop vistas, waterfalls, and deep canyons, the trail has been noted as one of the most beautiful yet rugged backpacking trails in Pennsylvania.

== Route ==
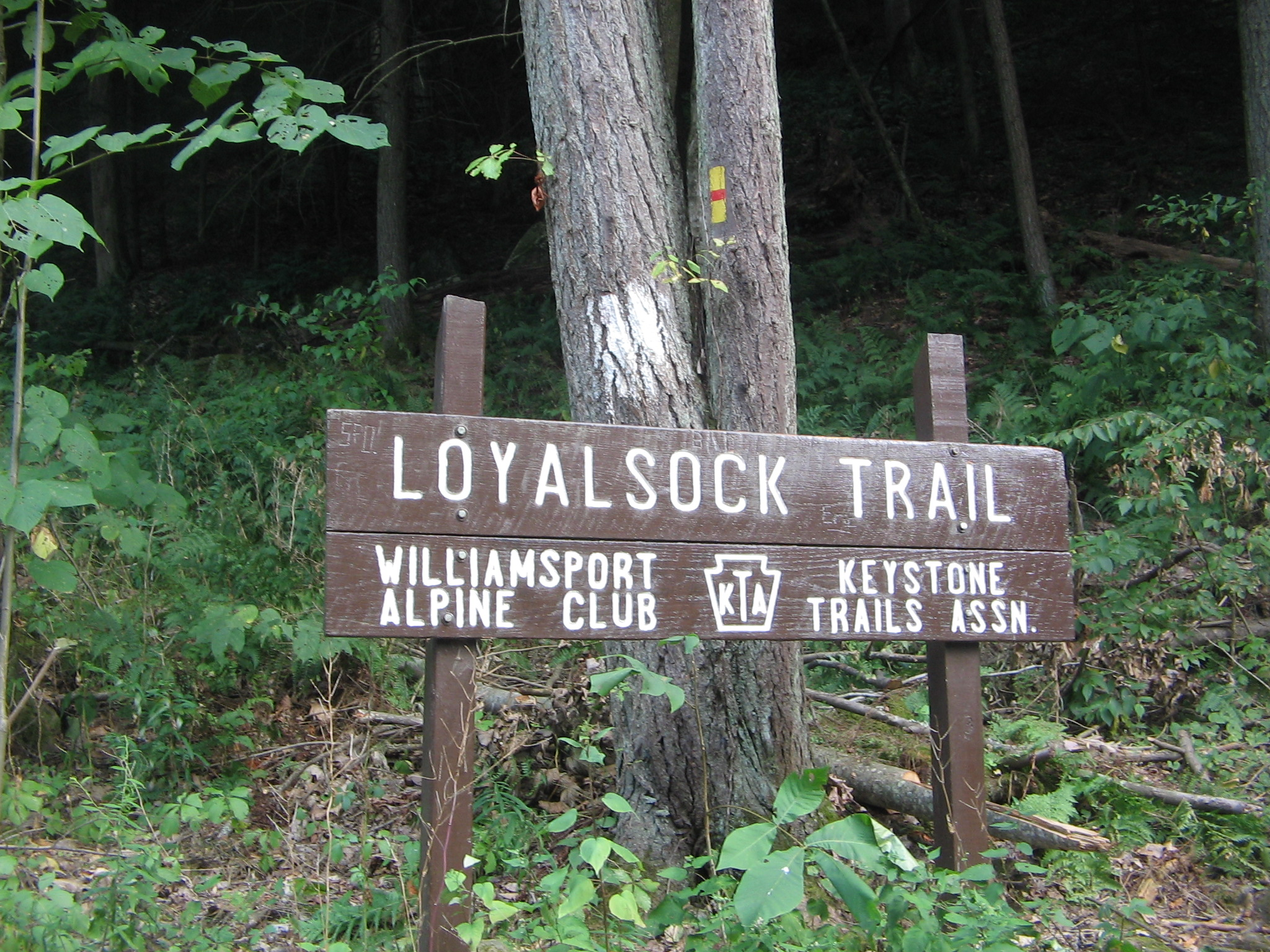
Western trailhead in Lycoming County

The Loyalsock Trail is traditionally described from west to east. The trail begins at a trailhead on PA Route 87, about 10 miles north of Montoursville, Lycoming County, and immediately climbs to the top of the Allegheny Plateau, passing a prominent rock formation called Sock Rock on the way up. At 6.7 miles the trail reaches a high point on top of Smiths Knob. The trail then descends a bit but remains in high plateau areas for a significant distance.

Starting at 13.1 miles, the trail descends steeply along Hessler Run but then climbs to the top of the plateau again. At 18.3 miles the trail passes above the small Highland Lake then turns to the north and enters Sullivan County. At 19.9 miles the trail reaches its highest point just north of the county line. The trail then descends into a rugged canyon formed by Ogdonia Run, and at 23.3 miles passes a side trail that leads a short distance to Angel Falls, which at 80 feet tall is the highest waterfall in the region.

Starting at 25.0 miles, the trail becomes particularly rugged as it skirts High Knob and then climbs in and out of several different side canyons formed by tributaries of Loyalsock Creek. This area includes numerous vistas. At 34.9 miles the trail uses a ladder to tackle a short cliff; this is the only such feature on any major hiking trail in Pennsylvania. The trail then continues in and out of various side canyons, with numerous waterfalls in the low areas and vistas in the high areas, until descending toward Loyalsock Creek and crossing PA Route 154 at 45.9 miles.

The trail then passes through Worlds End State Park, crossing Loyalsock Creek via a park road bridge, and rises to the top of the Allegheny Plateau again while curving back to the east. At 53.3 miles the trail begins a walk alongside the large Sones Pond, and about a mile later begins another steep descent toward Loyalsock Creek. At 55.3 miles the trail uses an old iron road bridge to cross the creek again. The trail rises part of the way up a ridge above the creek, but then descends back to the creek and passes the Haystacks rock formation in the middle of the creek at 57.2 miles. The trail is within sight of the creek for most of the rest of its distance, and ends at Mead Road after 59.2 miles. This trailhead is a short distance from US Route 220.
