= Hillsgrove Covered Bridge =

Bridge over Loyalsock Creek in Hillsgrove Township, Sullivan County, Pennsylvania

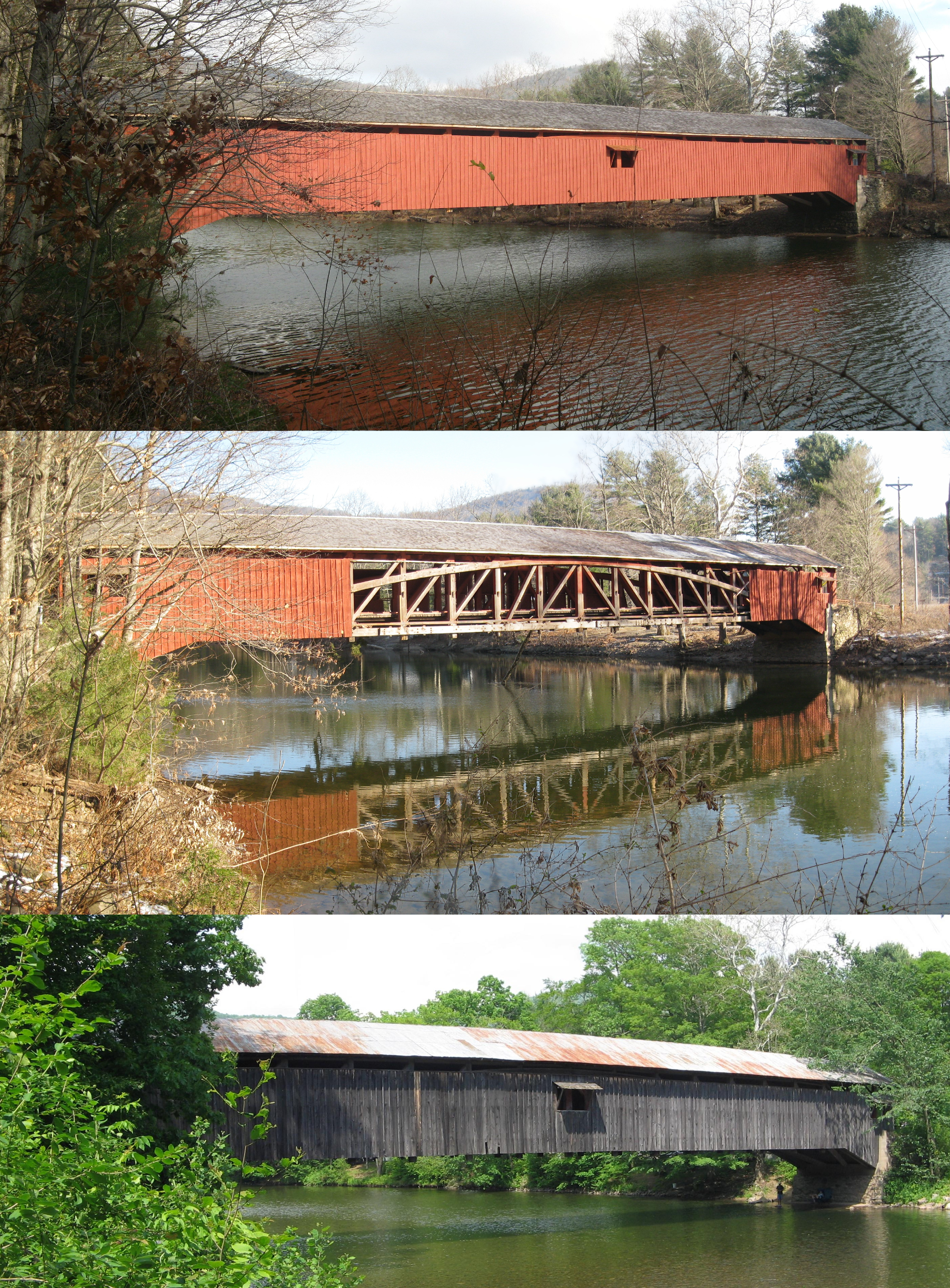
- Hillsgrove Covered Bridge over Loyalsock Creek after restoration in 2012 (top), with flood damage in 2011 (middle), and before restoration in 2008 (bottom)
- Coordinates: 41°27′39″N 76°40′15″W
- Carries: TR 357
- Crosses: Loyalsock Creek
- Locale: Sullivan, Pennsylvania, United States
- Official name: Hillsgrove Covered Bridge
- Other name: Rinkers Covered Bridge
- Named for: Hillsgrove Township
- Maintained by: Sullivan County
- NBI Number: 567207035700040

Characteristics
- Design: National Register of Historic Places
- Total length: 186 ft (57 m)
- Width: 18.0 ft (5.5 m)
- Height: 8.0 ft (2.4 m)
- Load limit: 3 tons (2.7 t)

History
- Constructed by: Sadler Rodgers
- Built: c. 1850
- Hillsgrove Covered Bridge
- U.S. National Register of Historic Places
- MPS: Covered Bridges of Bradford, Sullivan and Lycoming Counties TR
- NRHP reference No.: 73001666
- Added to NRHP: July 2, 1973

Location
- Interactive map of Hillsgrove Covered Bridge

The Hillsgrove Covered Bridge is a Burr arch truss covered bridge over Loyalsock Creek in Hillsgrove Township, Sullivan County, in the U.S. state of Pennsylvania. It was built around 1850 and is 186 feet (56.7 m) long. In 1973, it became the first covered bridge in the county to be placed on the National Register of Historic Places (NRHP). The bridge is named for the township and nearby unincorporated village of Hillsgrove, and is also known as Rinkers Covered Bridge for an adjoining farm.

Pennsylvania had the first covered bridge in the United States, and has had the most such bridges since the 19th century. They were a transition between stone and metal bridges, with the roof and sides protecting the wooden structure from the weather. The Hillsgrove bridge has load-bearing Burr arches sandwiching multiple vertical king posts on each side, for strength and rigidity. It was built by Sadler Rodgers, who also constructed the nearby Forksville Covered Bridge in the same year, with a similar design.

The Hillsgrove bridge is the longest of three covered bridges remaining in Sullivan County, and served as a landing site for lumber rafts on the creek between 1870 and 1890. Nineteenth-century regulations restricting speed, number of animals, and fire are still posted on the bridge. Restoration work was carried out in 1963, 1968, 2010, and again in 2012 after serious flood damage. The bridge is still in use, with average daily traffic of 54 vehicles in 2012. Despite these restorations, it had a "structurally deficient" rating in the 2012 National Bridge Inventory, with a 16.5 percent structural sufficiency rating.^{[a]}

== Overview ==
The covered bridge is in Hillsgrove Township on Covered Bridge Road (Township Road 357), which is 0.1 miles (0.16 km) north of Pennsylvania Route 87 via Splash Dam Road (TR 359). The bridge crosses Loyalsock Creek 2.6 miles (4.2 km) northeast and upstream of the unincorporated village of Hillsgrove, and is just south of Elkland Township. Its official name on the NRHP is Hillsgrove Covered Bridge. It is also known as Rinkers Covered Bridge for the Rinker farm, which is located at the east end of the bridge. Sullivan County is located in north central Pennsylvania, about 123 miles (198 km) northwest of Philadelphia and 195 miles (314 km) east-northeast of Pittsburgh.

The village of Hillsgrove is where Daniel Ogden became the first settler in what is now Sullivan County, c. 1786. John Hill, who founded and named the village of Hill's Grove (later just Hillsgrove), came to the area in 1789 and bought Ogden's land about 1794. Sullivan County was formed from part of Lycoming County on March 14, 1847, and the bridge was built in 1850. The division of Lycoming County ran through Plunketts Creek Township, so there were initially townships of this name in each of the adjoining counties. To avoid confusion, the name of the Sullivan County township was changed to Hillsgrove Township in 1856; the new township name was taken from the village of Hillsgrove, which was (and is) its largest settlement. Hillsgrove Covered Bridge is named for its township and the nearby village, and gave its name to a nearby one-room school known as the Bridge View School.

The name Hillsgrove Covered Bridge can also refer to a now vanished covered bridge, also over Loyalsock Creek, but in the village of Hillsgrove. This stood from 1876 until 1934, when it was condemned and replaced by a steel and concrete structure. It was the third covered bridge on the site: the first fell into the creek, and the second was torn down to make way for the third bridge.

== History ==
=== Background ===
The first covered bridge in the United States was built in 1800 over the Schuylkill River in Philadelphia, Pennsylvania. According to Susan M. Zacher, author of The Covered Bridges of Pennsylvania: A Guide, the first covered bridges of the Burr arch truss design were also built in the state. Pennsylvania is estimated to have once had at least 1,500 covered bridges and is believed to have had the most in the country between 1830 and 1875. In 2001, Pennsylvania had more surviving historic covered bridges than any other state; 221 remained in 40 of its 67 counties.

Covered bridges were a transition between stone and metal bridges, the latter made of cast-iron or steel. In 19th-century Pennsylvania, lumber was an abundant resource for bridge construction, but did not last long when exposed to the elements. The roof and enclosed sides of covered bridges protected the structural elements, allowing some of these bridges to survive for well over a century. A Burr arch truss consists of a load-bearing arch sandwiching multiple king posts, resulting in a stronger and more rigid structure than one made of either element alone. Although there were 30 covered bridges in Sullivan County in 1890, only five were left by 1954, and as of 2015 only three remain: Forksville, Hillsgrove, and Sonestown.

=== Construction and description ===
All three Sullivan County covered bridges were built c. 1850 with Burr arch trusses. The Hillsgrove bridge was built for Sullivan County by Sadler Rogers (or Rodgers), a native of Forksville who was only 18 years old at the time. He built the Forksville bridge the same year. The Forksville and Hillsgrove bridges both cross Loyalsock Creek, with the latter about 5 miles (8 km) further downstream. Although most sources do not list the builder of the Sonestown bridge, two newspaper articles on the remaining Sullivan County covered bridges reported that Rodgers had designed or possibly built it as well.

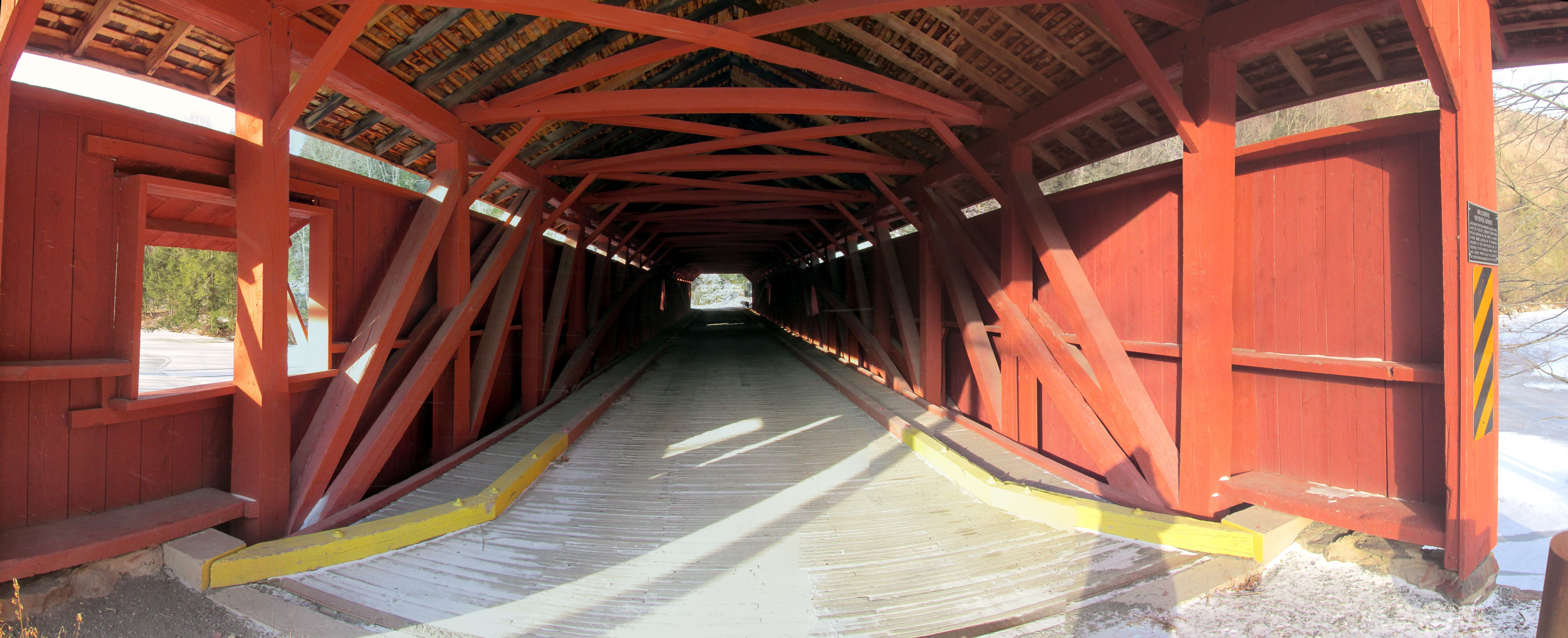
Bridge interior view (in 2015) showing Burr arches and King posts, the wooden beams bolted to the floor on each side are the wheel guards.

On July 2, 1973, the Hillsgrove bridge was the first covered bridge in Sullivan County to be added to the NRHP, and on July 24, 1980 it was again included on the NRHP in a Multiple Property Submission of seven Covered Bridges of Bradford, Sullivan and Lycoming Counties. The Hillsgrove bridge is on the 2013 National Bridge Inventory (NBI), which lists the covered bridge as 186 feet (56.7 m) long, with a maximum load of 5.0 short tons (4.5 t). However, the maximum load posted on the approaches to bridge itself is only 3.0 short tons (2.7 t). The 2006 NBI listed the bridge's roadway as 12 feet 2 inches (3.7 m) wide, while according to the NRHP, the bridge's "road surface width" is 18 feet (5.5 m), which is only sufficient for a single lane of traffic.

As of 2015, each portal has a sign with the posted clearance height of 8 feet (2.4 m). A sign posted on the east portal above the clearance preserves the following 19th-century limits on its use: "Notice: All persons are forbidden to ride drive or lead any animal over this bridge faster than a walk or to drive more than 15 head of cattle horses or mules thereon at one time or to carry fire thereon except in a safe vessel under a penalty of not less than $.30 for each offence." Prior to the 2010 restoration, the west portal had a "No Trucks Allowed" sign hanging below the clearance sign.

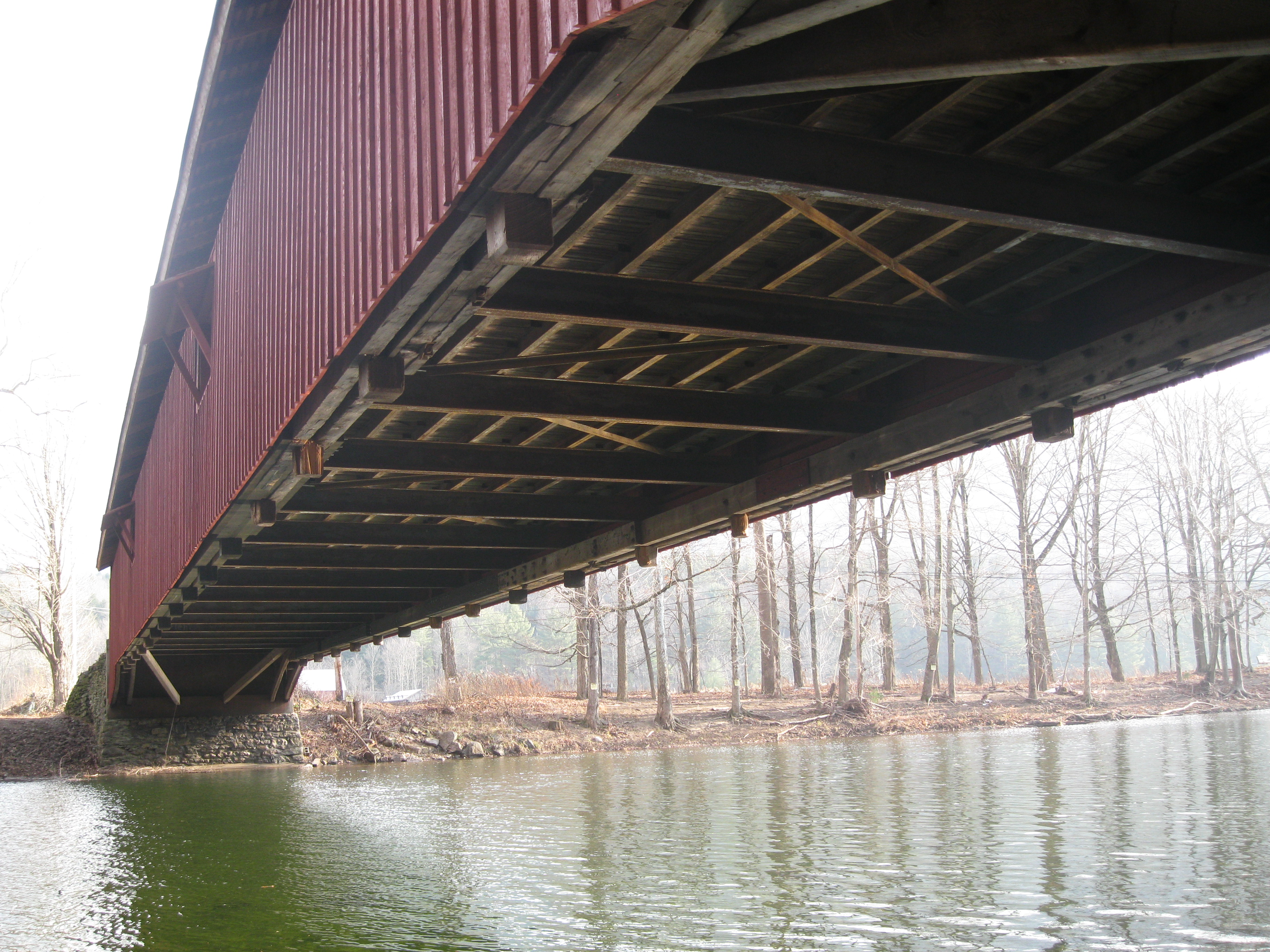
Underside of the bridge looking east, in 2012

The covered bridge rests on abutments of stone and mortar, which have been reinforced with concrete. There are no parapets. The bridge beams are reinforced in places with steel beams. The bridge deck is made of crosswise "narrow width laid flooring". Wheel guards on the deck separate the roadway from the pedestrian walkways on either side and protect the sides, which are covered with "vertical board and batten siding" almost to the eaves. The interior and exterior are painted red. The bridge has long, narrow windows with wooden shutters: the south side has three windows, and the north side has two. An opening between the eaves and the siding runs the length of the bridge on both sides. The gable roof is wooden shake shingles. The bridge is supported by a Burr arch truss, and is similar in design and construction to the one in Forksville. The western end of the Hillsgrove bridge lies against a steep hillside, and those approaching the bridge from the west must make a sharp right turn to enter it. Prior to the 2010 restoration, the sides were unpainted, but the portals were painted red, while the gable roof was sheet metal which had been installed over the original wooden shake shingles.

Attitudes towards covered bridges in Sullivan County changed considerably in the last half of the 20th century. Two of the five bridges that remained in 1954 were razed by 1970, when the Pennsylvania Department of Transportation considered tearing down the Forksville bridge (but renovated it because of its historic nature and appeal to tourists). The Hillsgrove Covered Bridge was added to the NRHP in 1973 and the two other bridges were added in 1980. The Pennsylvania Historical and Museum Commission now forbids the destruction of any covered bridge on the NRHP in the state and has to approve any renovation work.

=== Use and restoration ===
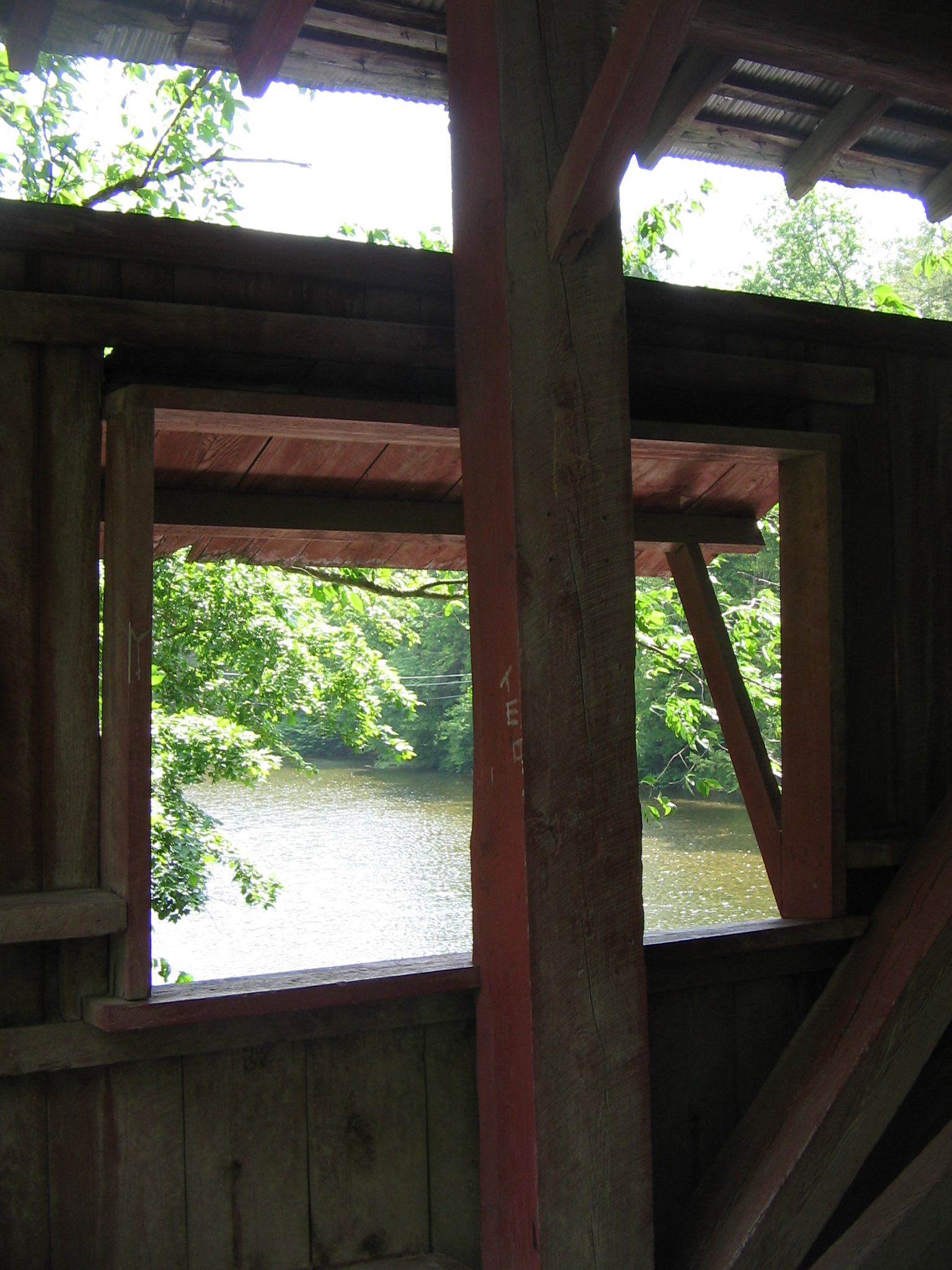
Loyalsock Creek from the easternmost window on the south side, with a King post in front of the window (in 2008)

In the 19th century the Hillsgrove Covered Bridge survived major floods on March 1, 1865, and June 1, 1889, that destroyed other bridges in the West Branch Susquehanna River valley. Between about 1870 and 1890, logging in the Loyalsock Creek watershed produced lumber rafts that floated beneath the bridge. The bridge was the site of "Uncle Ben's Landing" for lumber rafts, which did not travel at night. These rafts, each containing 5,000–30,000 board feet (11.8–70.8 m³) of lumber, were carried down the Loyalsock to its mouth at Montoursville. The raft era ended when the eastern hemlock were all clearcut.

An April, 1963 article on covered bridges in Sullivan and Lycoming counties noted that the Hillsgrove Bridge's deck was "a bit swaybacked", and according to the NBI data, the bridge was "reconstructed" in 1963. T. Corbin Lewis, a retired electrical contractor from Hillsgrove Township, restored the bridge in 1968. The concrete reinforcement on the southwest abutment of the Hillsgrove bridge is dated 1968, but the other work done in this restoration is not documented. Lewis also restored the Forksville Covered Bridge in 1970, with what its NRHP nomination form describes as "all kinds of odd repairs". Lewis' restoration work at Forksville involved cutting windows into the sides of the bridge for the first time, with four windows on the south side and three on the north. While the Hillsgrove bridge does have more windows on the south side (three) than the north (two), it is not known when they were added. A 1936 photograph of the bridge shows no windows on the south side, and no concrete reinforcement of the eastern abutment.

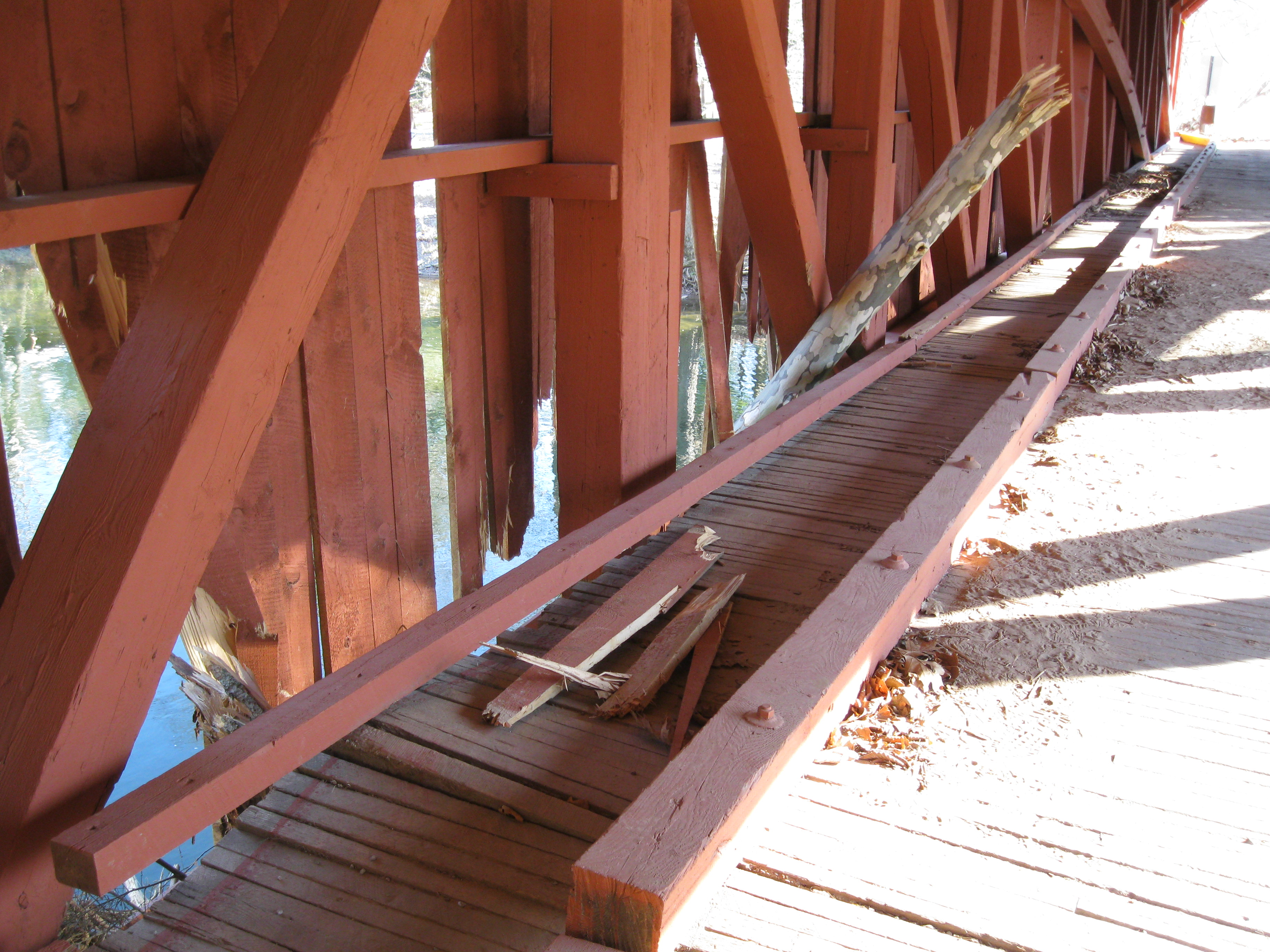
Flood damage in 2011 included broken beams and siding, two trees lodged in the bridge, and buckled floor

Covered Bridge Road north of Loyalsock Creek is accessed only by the Hillsgrove Covered Bridge at the eastern end, and a bridge over Elk Creek at the western end. Sullivan County replaced the bridge over Elk Creek between March 21 and July 21, 1989. Without the Elk Creek bridge, access for five families, a business, and a Little League Baseball camp with 110 children was limited to the covered bridge. County officials noted that despite the covered bridge's posted weight limit of 2.0 short tons (1.8 t), it could still support 5.0 short tons (4.5 t), sufficient for small fire trucks and ambulances. In an emergency, larger emergency vehicles could ford the creek if needed. In any case, the limited access did not cause any problems for the four-month period while the Elk Creek bridge was replaced.

The Evans' book describes repairs to the bridge's northeast siding, done between 1991 and 2000. In 2001, the US Department of Transportation Federal Highway Administration awarded $360,000 for 80 percent of the restoration costs of the Hillsgrove bridge under the Historic Covered Bridge Preservation Program. It was one of two bridges in Pennsylvania and 43 nationwide selected for the program that year. In 2010, the bridge was rehabilitated for the first time since the 1960s. Sullivan County solicited bids in February, expecting the project to cost between $200,000 and $500,000. The metal roof was replaced with cedar shake shingles, repairs were made to the wooden structure, portals, and siding, the bridge and deck were cleaned, and the bridge was painted red. The rehabilitation cost $150,516, and the bridge reopened in the autumn of 2010.

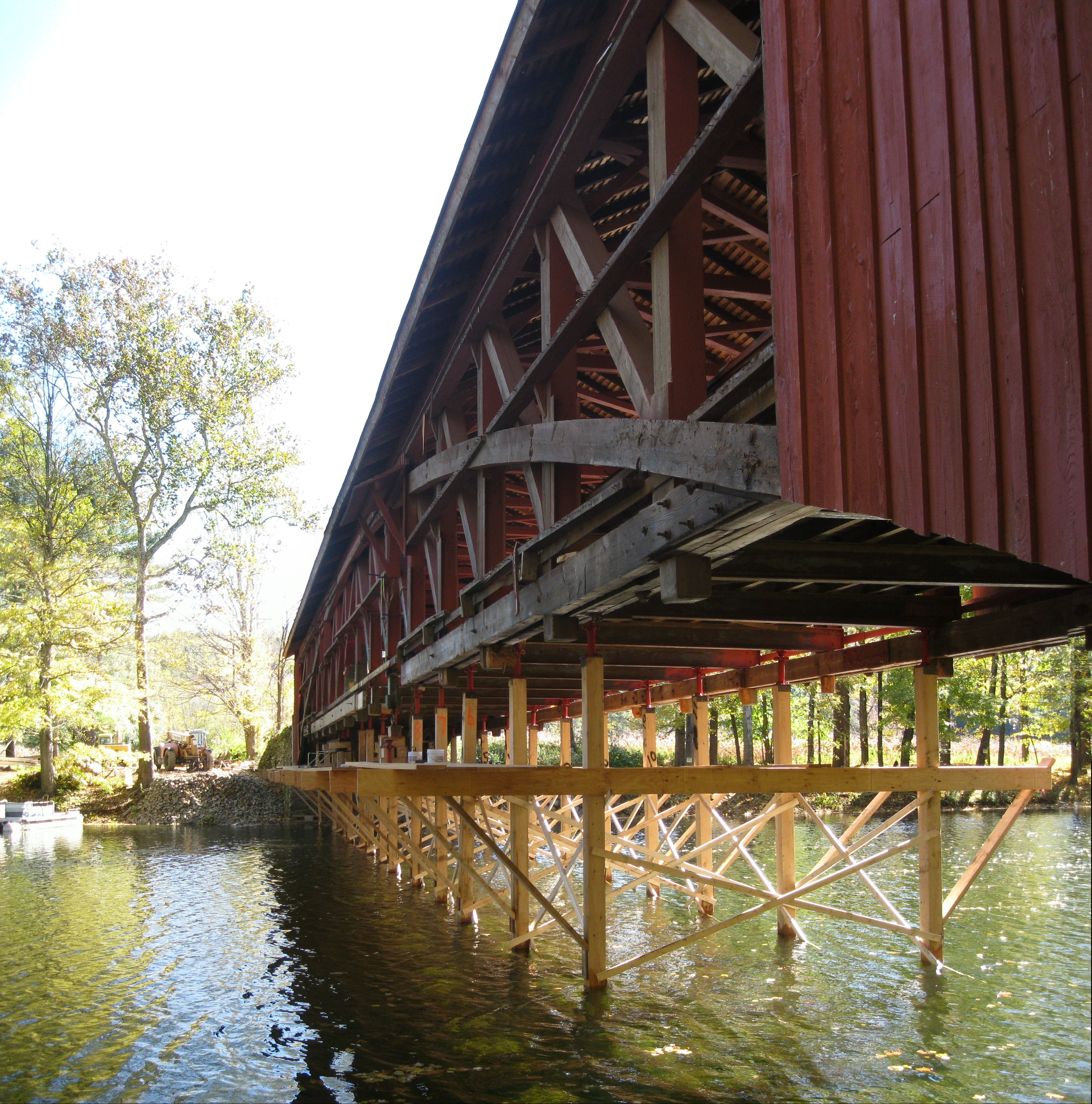
Scaffolding supporting the bridge during its post-flood restoration in 2012

In 2011, the bridge was badly damaged by historic flooding from Hurricane Irene in late August and Tropical Storm Lee in early September. Loyalsock Creek's flood waters swept debris into the bridge, removing much of the siding on the south side, washing out the approaches, damaging the structural beams, and leaving "two trees lodged between the timber low chord and timber deck" on the north side. While the Forksville covered bridge escaped serious damage, Hillsgrove and Sonestown were both closed, and Preservation Pennsylvania issued a report that questioned whether either bridge could be restored.

Sullivan County applied for and received Federal Emergency Management Agency funding for repairs to both bridges. The Hillsgrove bridge was restored first, as it was the main route to a restaurant and heavily used by hunters. Repairs included replacement of broken structural beams, sections of the deck, and siding. Because Loyalsock Creek is an "Exceptional Value Stream", the scaffolding that supported the structure on the creek bed during the $250,000-restoration had to be approved by the Pennsylvania Department of Environmental Protection. The bridge was reopened on November 21, 2012, just in time for deer hunting season, by one of the Sullivan County Commissioners; the county commissioner had been married on the bridge exactly 25 years before.

Despite the 2010 restoration, the 2012 Federal Highway Administration National Bridge Inventory found the bridge to be "Structurally Deficient". In addition, the sufficiency rating of the bridge structure was 16.5 percent,^{[b]} and the bridge railings and approach guardrails did not meet "currently acceptable standards".

As of 2015, the bridge is still used; its average daily traffic was 54 vehicles in 2012. The bridge's 2012 post-flood restoration received an award for Emergency Response. A 2014 book, America's Covered Bridges - Practical Crossings - Nostalgic Icons, included two photos of the Hillsgrove Covered Bridge (and the nearby Forksville Covered Bridge on the book's cover). According to Zacher, the "Sullivan County bridges, because of their settings, are some of the most attractive in the state".

== Bridge dimensions ==
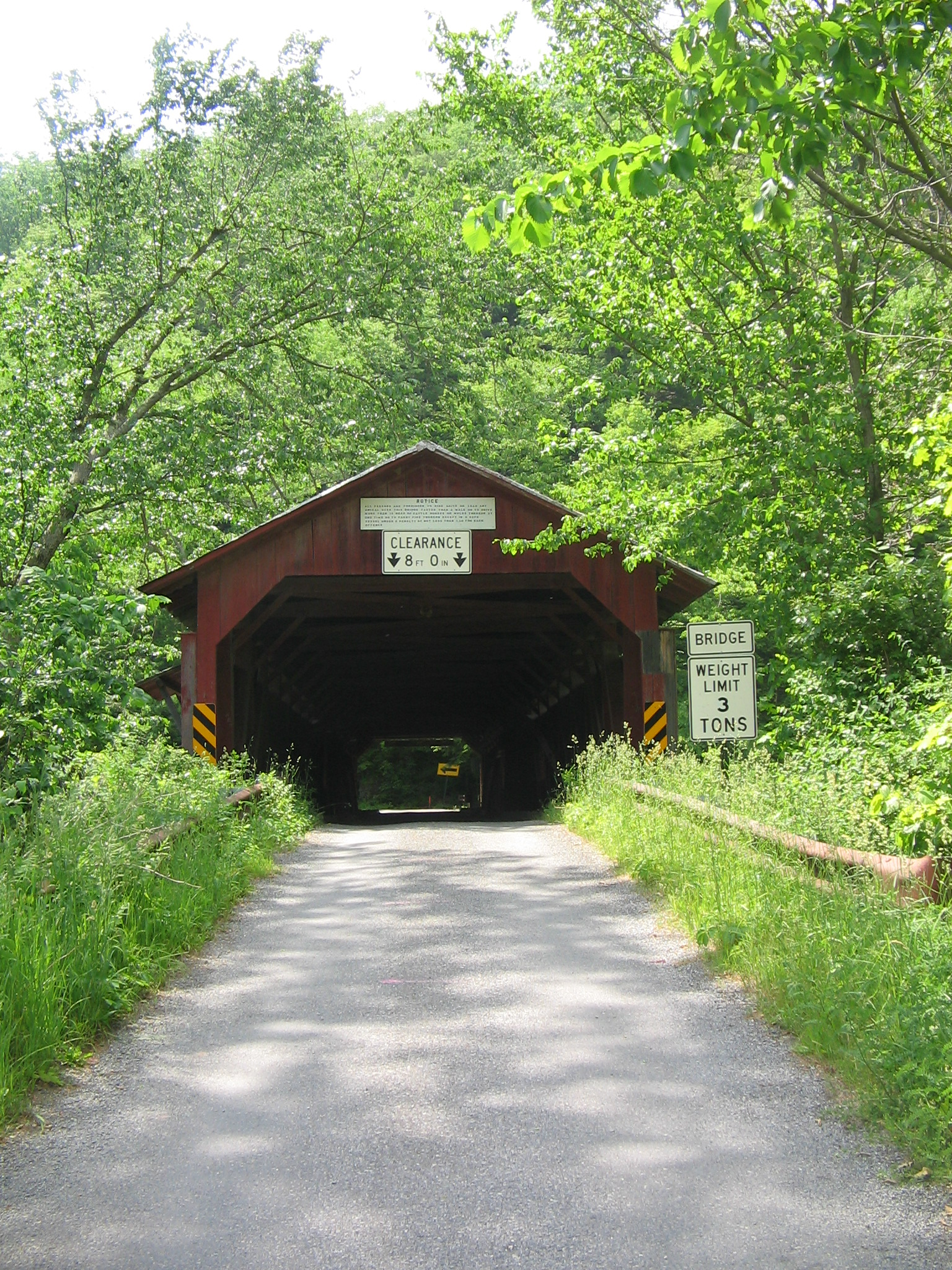
The east portal (seen in 2008) has signs for clearance and the historic limits on animals and fire on the bridge.

The following table is a comparison of published measurements of length, width and load recorded in different sources using different methods, as well as the name or names cited. The NBI measures bridge length between the "backwalls of abutments" or pavement grooves and the roadway width as "the most restrictive minimum distance between curbs or rails". The NRHP form was prepared by the Pennsylvania Historical and Museum Commission (PHMC), which surveyed county engineers, historical and covered bridge societies, and others for all the covered bridges in the commonwealth. The Evans visited every covered bridge in Pennsylvania in 2001 and measured each bridge's length (portal to portal) and width (at the portal) for their book. The data in Zacher's book was based on a 1991 survey of all covered bridges in Pennsylvania by the PHMC and the Pennsylvania Department of Transportation, aided by local government and private agencies. The article uses primarily the NBI and NRHP data, as they are national programs.

Source	Year	Length feet (m)	Width feet (m)	Load short tons (MT)	Name used
NBI	2012	186 feet (56.7 m)	12 feet 2 inches (3.71 m)	5.0 short tons (4.5 t)	Hillsgrove
NRHP	1980	171 feet (52.1 m)	18 feet (5.5 m)	3.0 short tons (2.7 t)	Hillsgrove
Evans	2001	185 feet 8 inches (56.59 m)	15 feet (4.6 m)	NA	Hillsgrove, Rinkers
Zacher	1994	152 feet (46.3 m)	18 feet (5.5 m)	NA	Hillsgrove

== See also ==
- List of covered bridges on the National Register of Historic Places in Pennsylvania

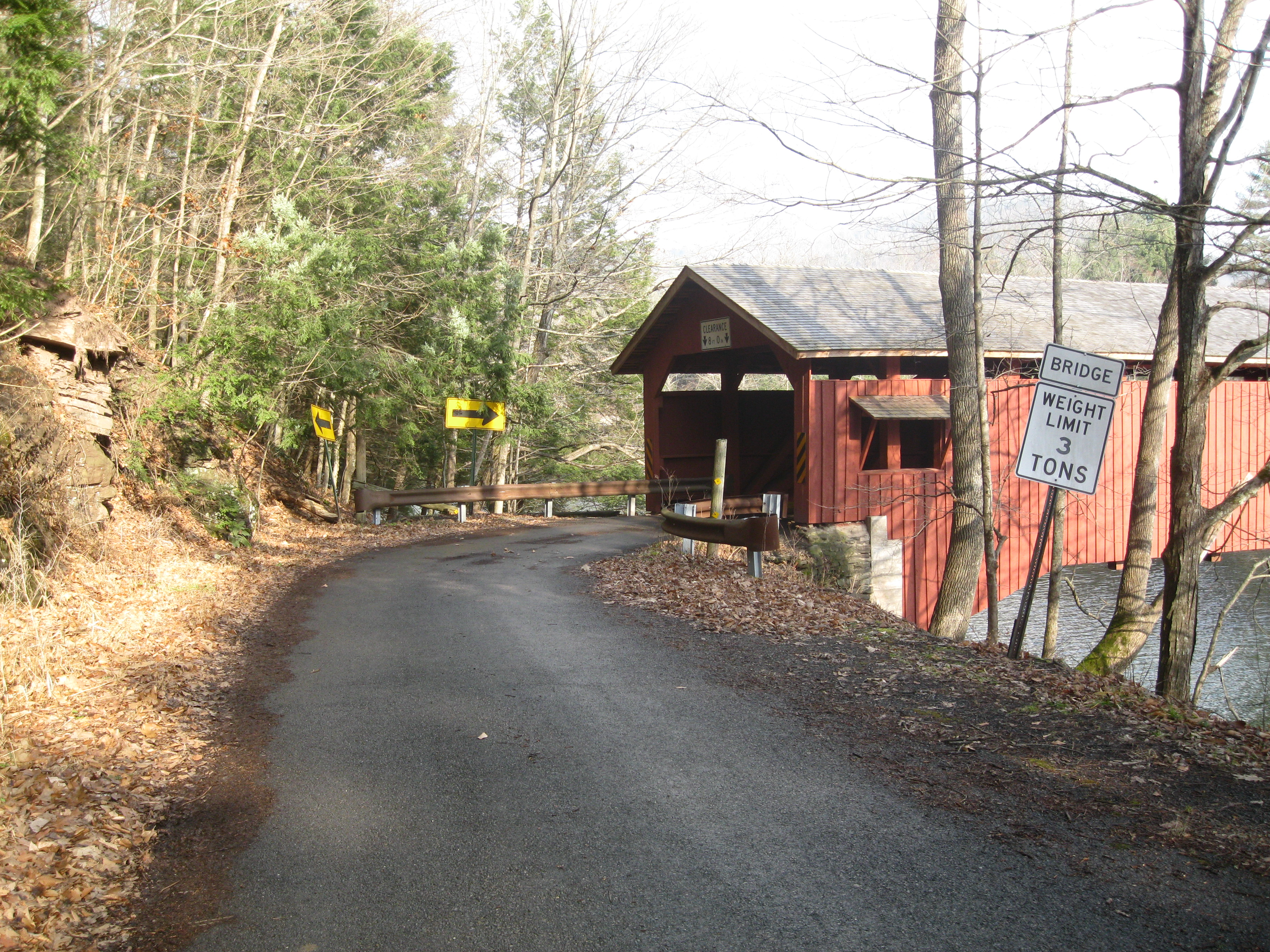
West portal and part of the south side of the bridge, showing the sharp turn to enter on this side

== Notes ==
a. The National Bridge Inventory (NBI) is published each year in January by the National Highway Administration, using data submitted by state highway agencies which they collected during the preceding year. The official NBI is published only in a machine-readable format; the only free, user-friendly version is at least a year out of date, so easily accessible NBI data is two or more years old.
b. The National Highway Administration established the sufficiency rating, which can vary from a low of 0 to a high of 100, as a way to prioritize federal funding for bridges. The rating is calculated for bridges over 20 feet (6.1 m) long, based on "structural adequacy, whether the bridge is functionally obsolete, and level of service provided to the public". Federal funds are available for replacement of bridges with a rating of 50 or below, while those with a rating of 80 or below qualify for rehabilitation. In 2013, Pennsylvania had 22,659 bridges on the NBI, of which 42.2 percent were either structurally deficient (23.0 percent) or functionally obsolete (19.2 percent).
