= Forksville Covered Bridge =

Bridge over Loyalsock Creek, Pennsylvania

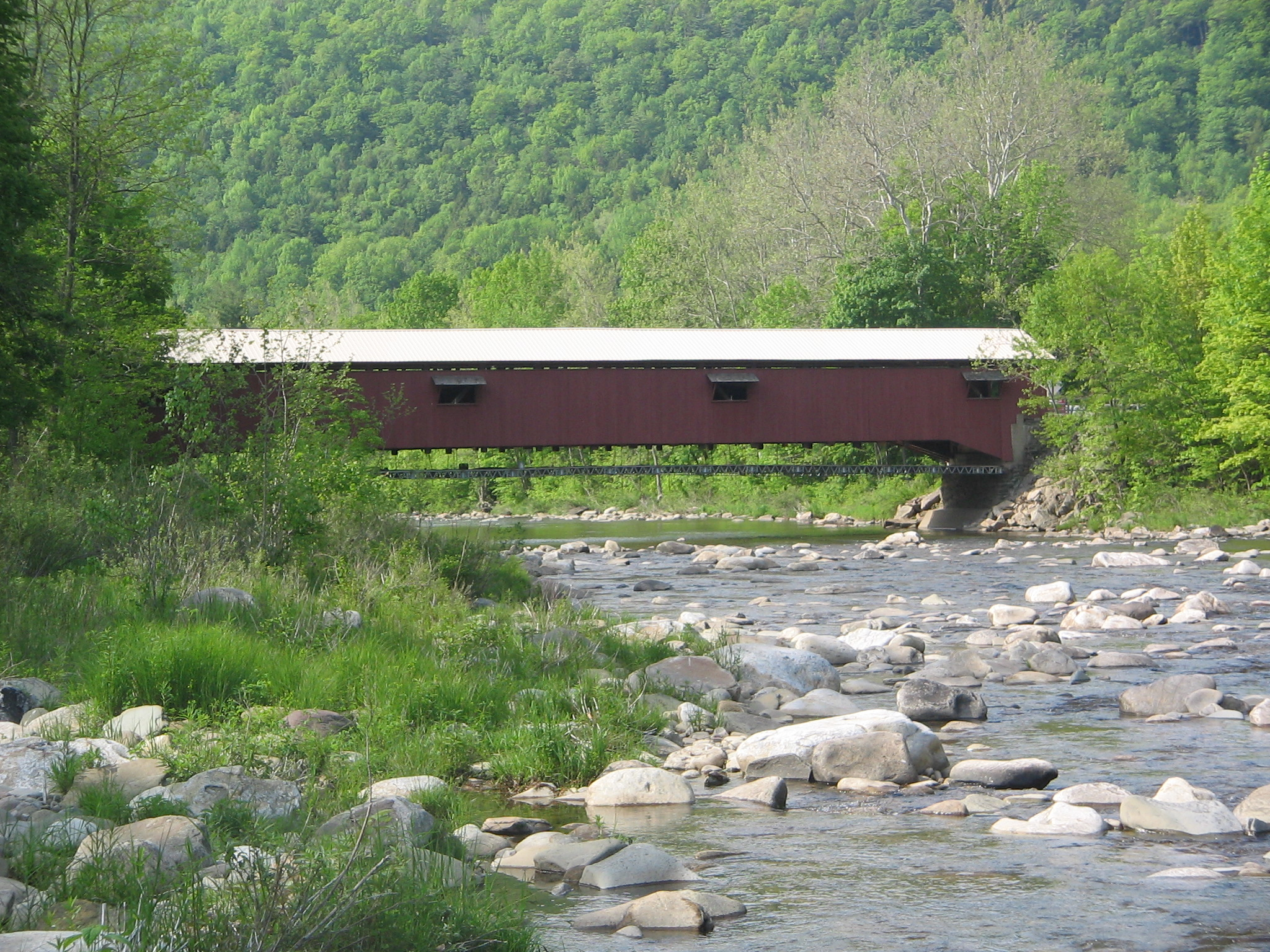
- The Forksville Covered Bridge over Loyalsock Creek, as seen from the south
- Coordinates: 41°29′18″N 76°36′00″W
- Carries: State Route 4012
- Crosses: Loyalsock Creek
- Locale: Sullivan, Pennsylvania, United States
- Official name: Forksville Covered Bridge
- Named for: Forksville
- Maintained by: Pennsylvania, PennDOT
- NBI Number: 000000000032068

Characteristics
- Design: National Register of Historic Places
- Total length: 152.9 ft (46.6 m)
- Width: 15.0 ft (4.6 m)
- Height: 8.0 ft (2.4 m)
- Load limit: 3 tons (2.7 t)

History
- Constructed by: Sadler Rogers (or Rodgers)
- Built: 1850
- Rebuilt: 1970, 2004

Statistics
- Daily traffic: 240 per day
- Forksville Covered Bridge
- U.S. National Register of Historic Places
- MPS: Covered Bridges of Bradford, Sullivan and Lycoming Counties TR
- NRHP reference No.: 80003639
- Added to NRHP: July 24, 1980

Location
- Interactive map of Forksville Covered Bridge

The Forksville Covered Bridge is a Burr arch truss covered bridge over Loyalsock Creek in the borough of Forksville, in the U.S. state of Pennsylvania. It was built in 1850 and is 152 feet 11 inches (46.61 m) in length. The bridge was placed on the National Register of Historic Places in 1980. The Forksville bridge is named for the borough it is in, which in turn is named for its location at the confluence or "forks" of the Little Loyalsock and Loyalsock Creeks.

Pennsylvania had the first covered bridge in the United States and the most such bridges in both the 19th and 21st centuries. They were a transition between stone and metal bridges, with the roof and sides protecting the wooden structure from weather. The Forksville bridge is a Burr arch truss type, with a load-bearing arch sandwiching multiple vertical king posts, for strength and rigidity. The building of the Forksville bridge was supervised by the 18-year-old Sadler Rogers, who used his hand-carved model of the structure. It served as the site of a stream gauge from 1908 to 1913 and is still an official Pennsylvania state highway bridge. The United States Department of Transportation's Federal Highway Administration uses it as the model of a covered bridge "classic gable roof", and it serves as the logo of a Pennsylvania insurance company.

The bridge was restored in 1970 and 2004 and is still in use, with average daily traffic of 240 vehicles in 2014. Despite the restorations, as of 2009 the bridge structure's sufficiency rating on the National Bridge Inventory was only 17.7 percent and its condition was deemed "basically intolerable requiring high priority of corrective action". It is one of three remaining covered bridges in Sullivan County, and according to Susan M. Zacher's The Covered Bridges of Pennsylvania: A Guide, its location "over the rocky Loyalsock Creek" is "one of the most attractive settings in the state."

== Overview ==
The covered bridge is in the borough of Forksville on Bridge Street, a spur of State Route 4012, just west of Pennsylvania Route 154. It is about 0.2 miles (300 m) south of Pennsylvania Route 87 and 2.0 miles (3 km) north of Worlds End State Park on PA 154. Forksville Covered Bridge is its official name on the National Register of Historic Places (NRHP). Sullivan County is located in north central Pennsylvania, about 123 miles (198 km) northwest of Philadelphia and 195 miles (314 km) east-northeast of Pittsburgh.

The bridge is just upstream of the confluence of the Little Loyalsock and Loyalsock Creeks. This was known as the "forks of the Loyalsock" and gave Forks Township its name when the township was incorporated in 1833, while still part of Lycoming County. Sullivan County was formed from part of Lycoming County on March 14, 1847, and the bridge was built in 1850. The name of the bridge comes from the community of Forksville, which is on land first settled in 1794, was laid out as a village in 1854, and was incorporated as a borough from part of Forks Township on December 22, 1880.

== History ==
=== Background ===
The first covered bridge in the United States was built in 1800 over the Schuylkill River in Philadelphia, Pennsylvania. According to Zacher, the first covered bridges of the Burr arch truss design were also built in the state. Pennsylvania is estimated to have once had at least 1,500 covered bridges and is believed to have had the most in the country between 1830 and 1875. In 2001, Pennsylvania had more surviving historic covered bridges than any other state, with 221 remaining in 40 of its 67 counties.

Covered bridges were a transition between stone and metal bridges, the latter made of cast-iron or steel. In 19th-century Pennsylvania, lumber was an abundant resource for bridge construction, but did not last long when exposed to the elements. The roof and enclosed sides of covered bridges protected the structural elements, allowing some of these bridges to survive for well over a century. A Burr arch truss consists of a load-bearing arch sandwiching multiple king posts, resulting in stronger and more rigid structure than one made of either element alone.

=== Construction and description ===
Although there were 30 covered bridges in Sullivan County in 1890, only five were left by 1954, and as of 2011 only three remain: Forksville, Hillsgrove, and Sonestown. All three are Burr arch truss covered bridges and were built in 1850. The Forksville Covered Bridge was built for Sullivan County by Sadler Rogers (or Rodgers), a native of Forksville who was only 18 at the time. He hand-carved a model of the bridge before work began and used it to supervise construction. Rogers built the Forksville and Hillsgrove bridges across Loyalsock Creek, with the latter about 5 miles (8.0 km) downstream of the former. Although most sources do not list the builder of the Sonestown bridge, a 1997 newspaper article on the remaining Sullivan County covered bridges reported that Rodgers had designed it too.

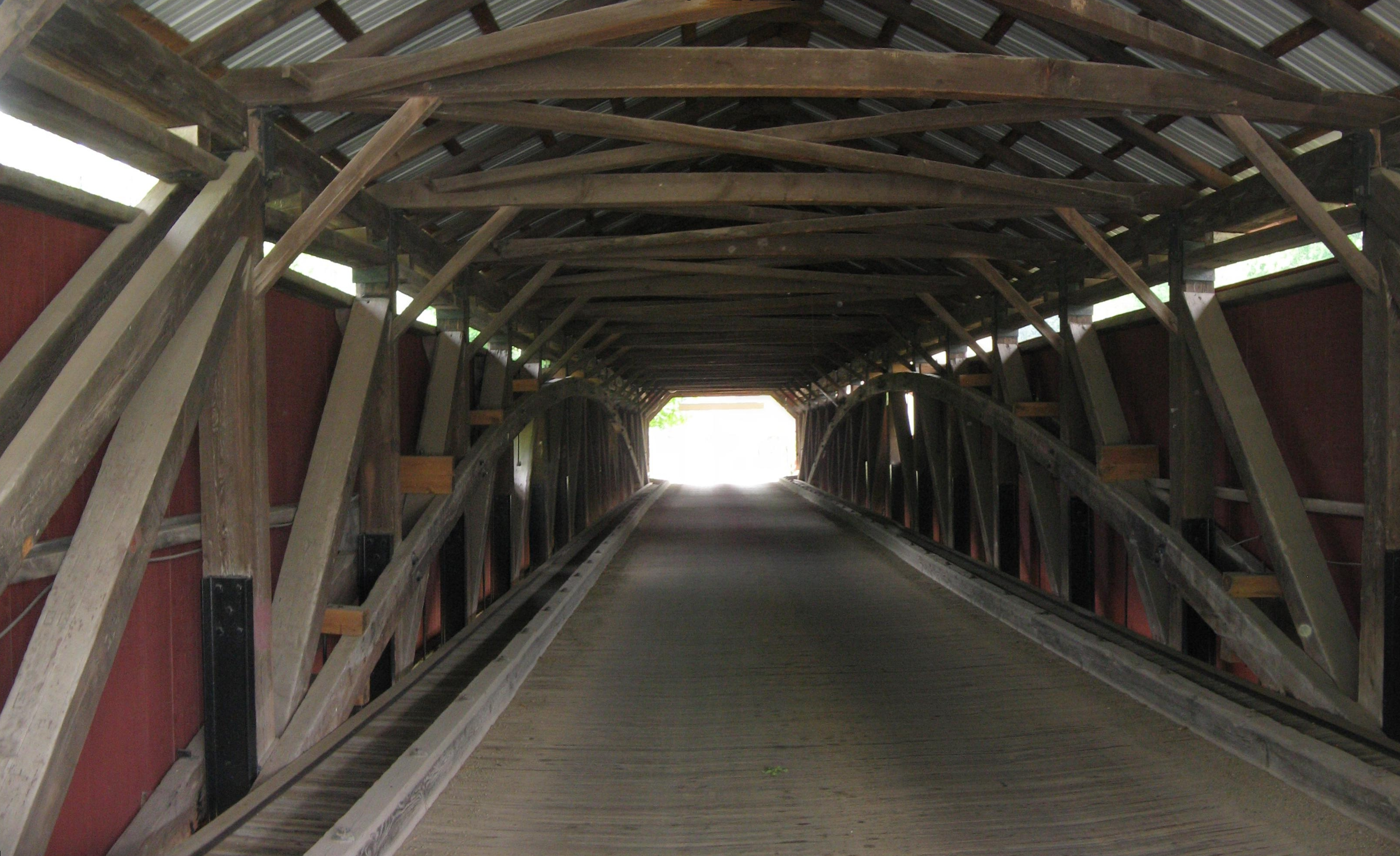
Bridge interior view showing Burr arches

The Forksville Covered Bridge was added to the NRHP on July 24, 1980, in a Multiple Property Submission of seven Covered Bridges of Bradford, Sullivan and Lycoming Counties. The 2009 National Bridge Inventory (NBI) lists the covered bridge as 152 feet 11 inches (46.6 m) long, with a roadway 12 feet 2 inches (3.7 m) wide, and a maximum load of 3.0 short tons (2.7 metric tons). According to the NRHP, the bridge's "road surface width" is 15 feet (4.6 m), which is only sufficient for a single lane of traffic. As of 2011, each portal has a small sign reading "1850 Sadler Rogers" at the top, above a sign with the posted clearance height of 8.0 feet (2.4 m), and a "No Trucks Allowed" sign hanging below these.

The covered bridge rests on the original stone abutments, which have since been reinforced with concrete. The bridge deck, which is now supported by steel beams, is made of "very narrow crosswise planks". Wheel guards on the deck separate the roadway from the pedestrian walkways on either side and protect the sides, which are covered with vertical planks almost to the eaves. The bridge has long, narrow windows with wooden shutters: the south side has four windows, and the north side has three. An opening between the eaves and the siding runs the length of the bridge on both sides. The bridge is supported by a Burr arch truss of 16 panels, with wooden beams. The gable roof is sheet metal and is used as the model illustration of a "classic gable roof" for a covered bridge by the Turner-Fairbank Highway Research Center of the U.S. Department of Transportation's Federal Highway Administration.

=== Restoration and use ===
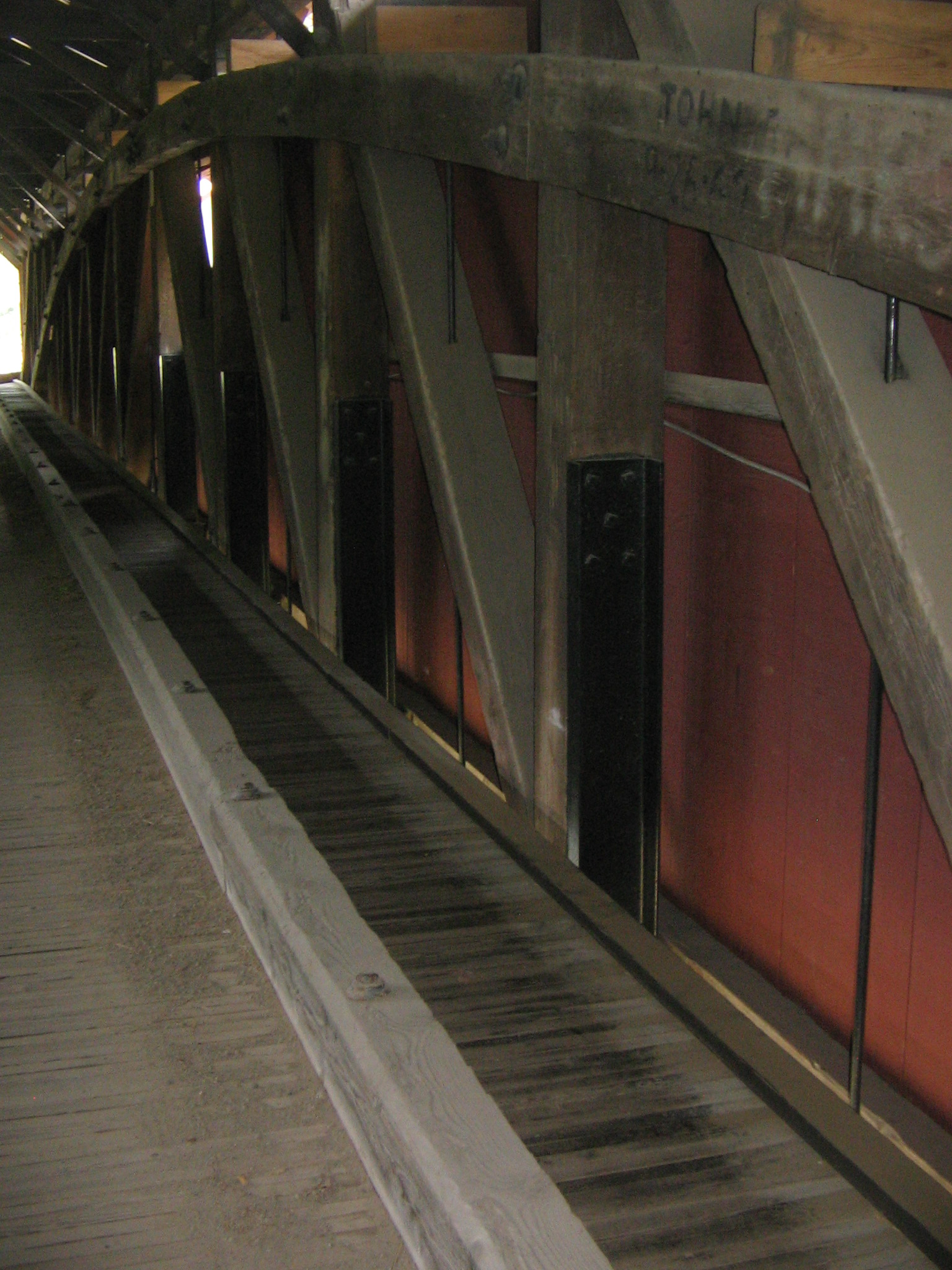
Detail of wooden deck, wheel guard, walkway, and black steel girders on the vertical king posts

In the 19th century the Forksville Covered Bridge survived major floods on March 1, 1865, and June 1, 1889, that destroyed other bridges in the West Branch Susquehanna River valley. Between about 1870 and 1890, logging in the Loyalsock Creek watershed produced lumber rafts that floated beneath the bridge. These rafts, each containing 5,000–30,000 board feet (12–70 m^{3}) of lumber, were carried down the Loyalsock to its mouth at Montoursville, and some continued on the West Branch Susquehanna River beyond. The rafts ended when the eastern hemlock were all clearcut.

From 1908 to 1913, there was a stream gauge on the bridge. Twice a day, the creek height was read on a chain 21.88 feet (6.67 m) long on the bridge's upstream side, and discharge measurements were taken on the downstream side. At the time it served as a "single span, wooden, covered highway bridge". The bridge survived another major flood on November 16, 1926, when a dam broke upstream but was "badly damaged" by an ice jam on January 23, 1959, in a flood that left blocks of ice weighing up to 500 pounds (230 kg) in the streets of Forksville.

The Forksville Covered Bridge was restored in 1970 with what the NRHP nomination form describes as "all kinds of odd repairs". The restoration work was completed by T. Corbin Lewis of Hillsgrove Township, a retired electrical contractor, whose low bid of $48,000 was accepted over a Baltimore, Maryland, firm's $185,000 bid. The restoration was supervised by the Pennsylvania Department of Transportation (PennDOT), which owns and maintains the bridge. The repair involved minor work on the "steel floor beams and stringers", which had been added years before. An entirely new wooden deck was installed, with wheel guards (wooden curbs) to channel vehicle traffic to the center and to protect the pedestrian walkways on the sides. Windows were cut in the bridge's sides for the first time, and steel girders were "added to support the bridge's understructure."

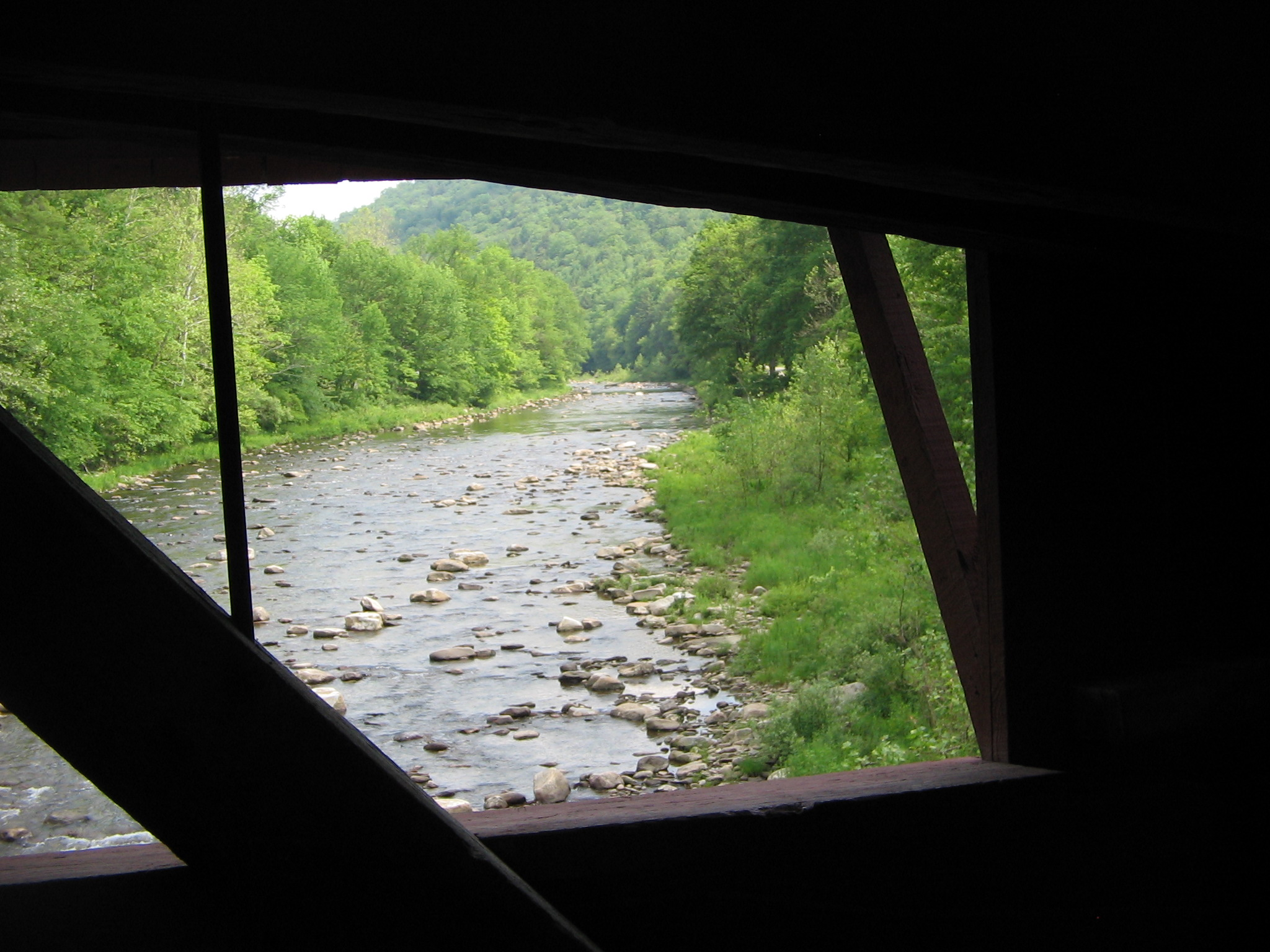
View south to Loyalsock Creek out of a window cut in the bridge in 1970

Attitudes towards covered bridges in Sullivan County changed considerably in the last half of the 20th century. Two of the five bridges remaining in 1954 were razed by 1970, when PennDOT considered tearing down the Forksville bridge too. It was renovated rather than razed because of its historic nature and appeal to tourists. The Forksville Covered Bridge was added to the NRHP in 1980, and the Pennsylvania Historical and Museum Commission now forbids the destruction of any covered bridge on the NRHP in the state and has to approve any renovation work.

The NBI says the bridge was "reconstructed" in 2004 but does not give further details. The entire bridge has been reinforced with steel girders, including vertical beams. In 2006 the red bridge was repainted, which took about three weeks. In 2015, the bridge was briefly closed for $162,000 in waterproofing and concrete repairs to its abutments.

The bridge's condition was described as "good" in the 1980 NRHP form, Zacher's 1994 book, and the Evans' 2001 book. However, the 2009 Federal Highway Administration National Bridge Inventory found the sufficiency rating of the bridge structure to be 17.7 percent.^{[a]} It found that the bridge's foundations were "determined to be stable for calculated scour conditions" but that the railing "does not meet currently acceptable standards". Its overall condition was deemed "basically intolerable requiring high priority of corrective action"; the 2006 NBI estimated the cost to improve the bridge at $463,000.

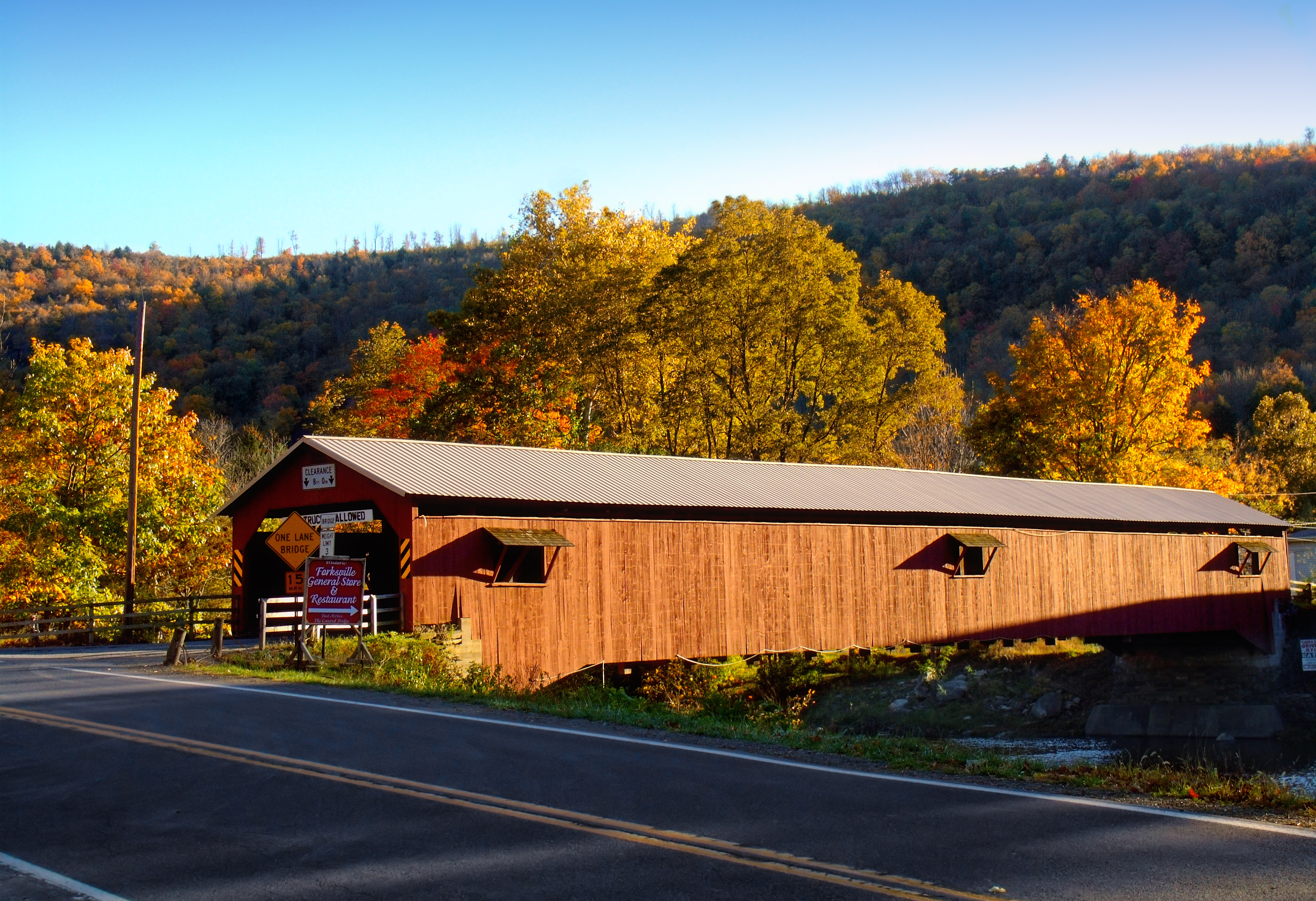
The east portal and north side of the bridge from PA 154

The bridge was decorated with lights for Christmas in 1992. In 2010, Forksville had 145 residents. The Forksville Covered Bridge is heavily used, as it is the most direct and shortest route from PA 154, at the eastern end, to Forksville and its general store, which are at the western end. The posted speed limit is 15 miles per hour (24 km/h), and its average daily traffic was 240 vehicles in 2014. The bridge is used as the logo of the Farmers & Mechanics Mutual Insurance Company, which was founded in Sullivan County in 1877.

In addition to its utility, the bridge is appreciated for its history and beauty. In 1970 a long-time Forksville resident spoke of the bridge's connection to the past: "When you stand quiet on the bridge and the woods are still, you can almost hear the horses clomping over the wooden deck as they did in years gone by; you can almost see the youngsters who climbed the rafters of the bridge to 'skinny-dip' in the creek below". Zacher's 1994 The Covered Bridges of Pennsylvania: A Guide describes the bridge's location "over the rocky Loyalsock Creek" as "one of the most attractive settings in the state."

== Bridge data ==
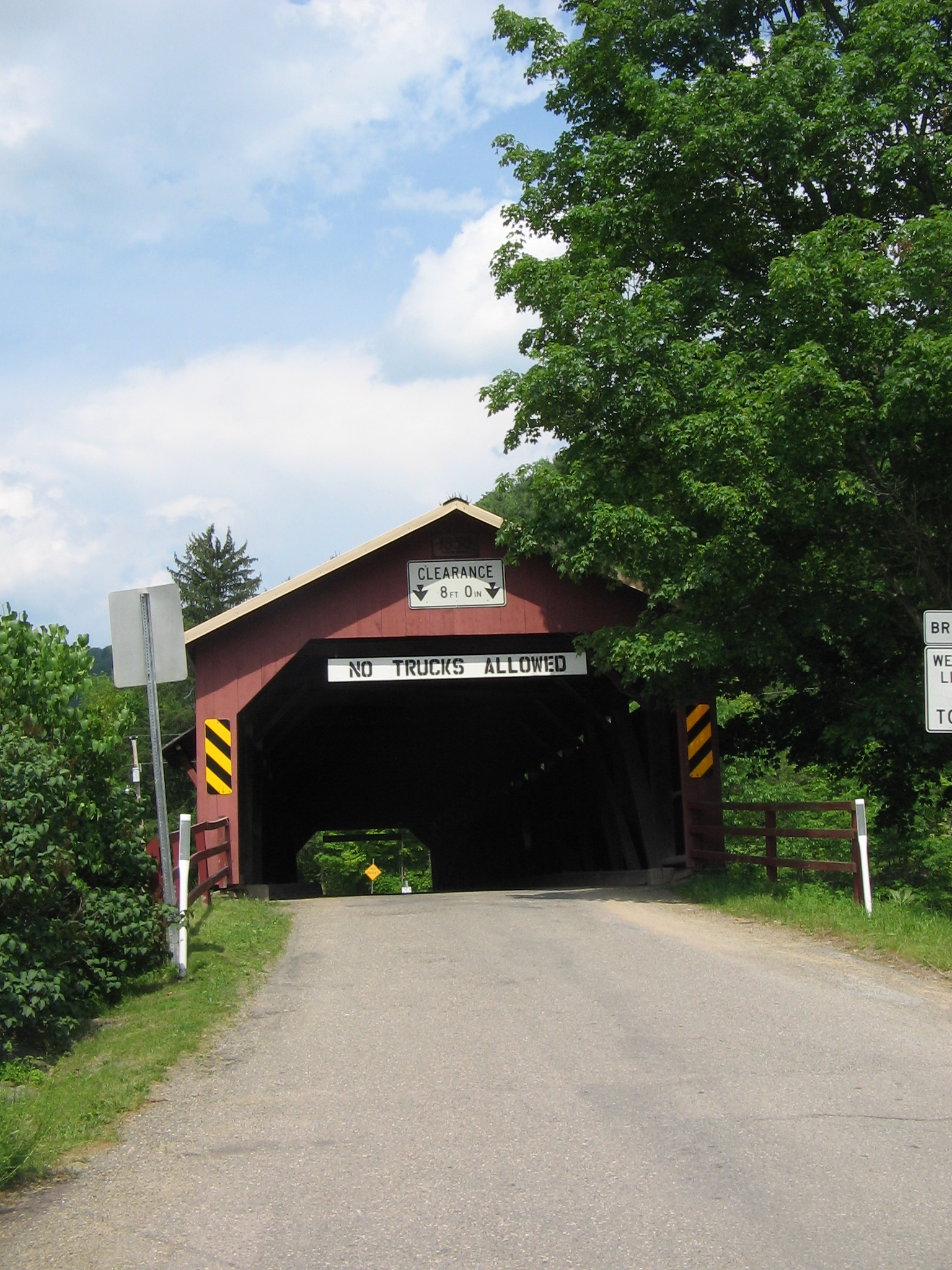
Clearance and "No Trucks Allowed" signs on west portal

The following table is a comparison of published measurements of length, width and load recorded by four different sources using different methods, as well as the name cited for the bridge and its builder. The NBI measures bridge length between the "backwalls of abutments" or pavement grooves and the roadway width as "the most restrictive minimum distance between curbs or rails". The NRHP form was prepared by the Pennsylvania Historical and Museum Commission (PHMC), which surveyed county engineers, historical and covered bridge societies, and others for all the covered bridges in the commonwealth. The Evans visited every covered bridge in Pennsylvania in 2001 and measured each bridge's length (portal to portal) and width (at the portal) for their book. The data in Zacher's book was based on a 1991 survey of all covered bridges in Pennsylvania by the PHMC and PennDOT, aided by local government and private agencies. The article uses primarily the NBI and NRHP data, as they are national programs.

Variants in Forksville Covered Bridge data
Length feet (m)	Width feet (m)	Load short tons (MT)	Name used	Builder	Source (year)
152 feet 11 inches (46.6 m)	12 feet 2 inches (3.7 m)	3.0 short tons (2.7 t)	SR 4012	NA	NBI (2009)
146 feet (44.5 m)	15 feet (4.6 m)	N/A	Forksville	Sadler Rogers	NRHP (1980)
163 feet 3 inches (49.8 m)	18 feet 10.5 inches (5.8 m)	N/A	Forksville	Sadler Rodgers	Evans (2001)
130 feet (39.6 m)	15 feet (4.6 m)	N/A	Forksville	Sadler Rodgers	Zacher (1994)

== See also ==
- List of bridges on the National Register of Historic Places in Pennsylvania

== Note ==
a. The National Highway Administration established the sufficiency rating, which can vary from a low of 0 to a high of 100, as a way to prioritize federal funding for bridges. The rating is calculated for bridges over 20 feet (6.1 m) long, based on "structural adequacy, whether the bridge is functionally obsolete, and level of service provided to the public". Federal funds are available for replacement of bridges with a rating of 50 or below, while those with a rating of 80 or below qualify for rehabilitation. In 2009, Pennsylvania had 22,280 bridges on the NBI, of which 43.8 percent were either structurally deficient (27.2 percent) or functionally obsolete (16.6 percent).
