= Sonestown, Pennsylvania =

Unincorporated community in Pennsylvania, US

Sonestown
- Village
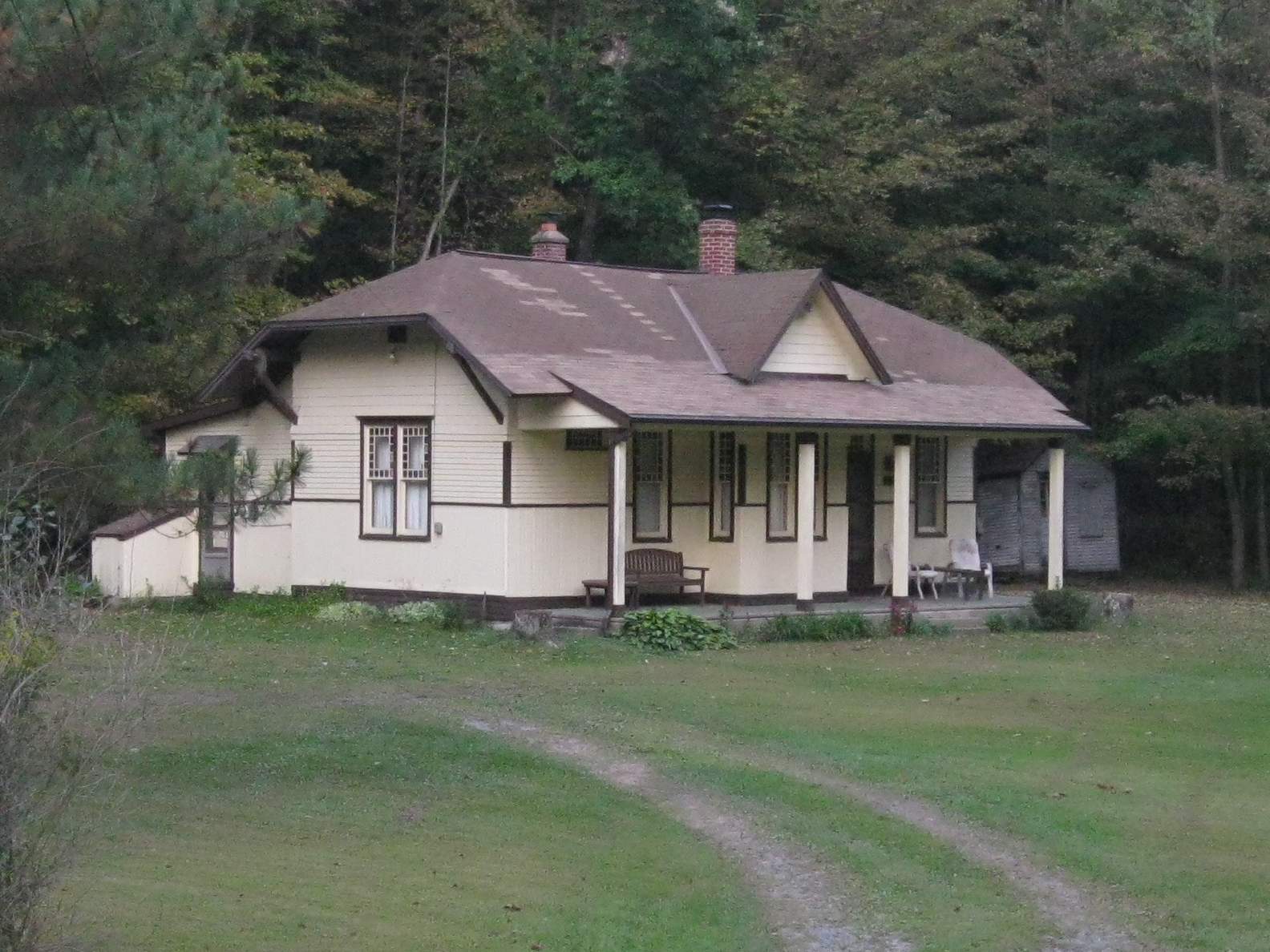
- The former Williamsport and North Branch Railroad depot in the village of Sonestown, Davidson Township, Sullivan County, Pennsylvania, USA

- Location within Pennsylvania
- Coordinates: 41°21′13″N 76°33′15″W
- Country: United States
- State: Pennsylvania
- County: Sullivan
- Established: 1843
- Founder: George Sones

Population (1996)
  - Total: 200

Sonestown is a former unincorporated village in what is now Davidson Township, Sullivan County, in the U.S. state of Pennsylvania.

== History and notable features ==
In 1843, George Sones built a sawmill and founded Sonestown, an unincorporated village within what is now Davidson Township in Sullivan County, Pennsylvania. This occurred before Sullivan County was formed from part of Lycoming County on March 14, 1847.

A bridge was then erected in 1850. During the late nineteenth century, Sonestown "boomed like crazy" as the county's lumber industry grew. The village was home, at that time, to a plant that manufactured staves for barrel making. The Eagles Mere Railroad (1892-1928), a narrow-gauge line providing rail access to the resort town of Eagles Mere, also had its southern terminus in Sonestown.

Although the town had a clothespin factory that operated roughly from 1903 to 1929, it lost almost all of its industrial capacity by the 1930s.

As of 1996, Sonestown had a population of roughly two hundred; most commuted to work in Muncy, Montoursville, and Williamsport. In 1996, the village had a few stores, an inn with a restaurant, which attracted tourists and hunters.

The village gives its name to Sonestown Covered Bridge, which is 1 mile (1.6 km) south of the village on Route 220.
