= Sonestown Covered Bridge =

Covered bridge in Sullivan County, Pennsylvania

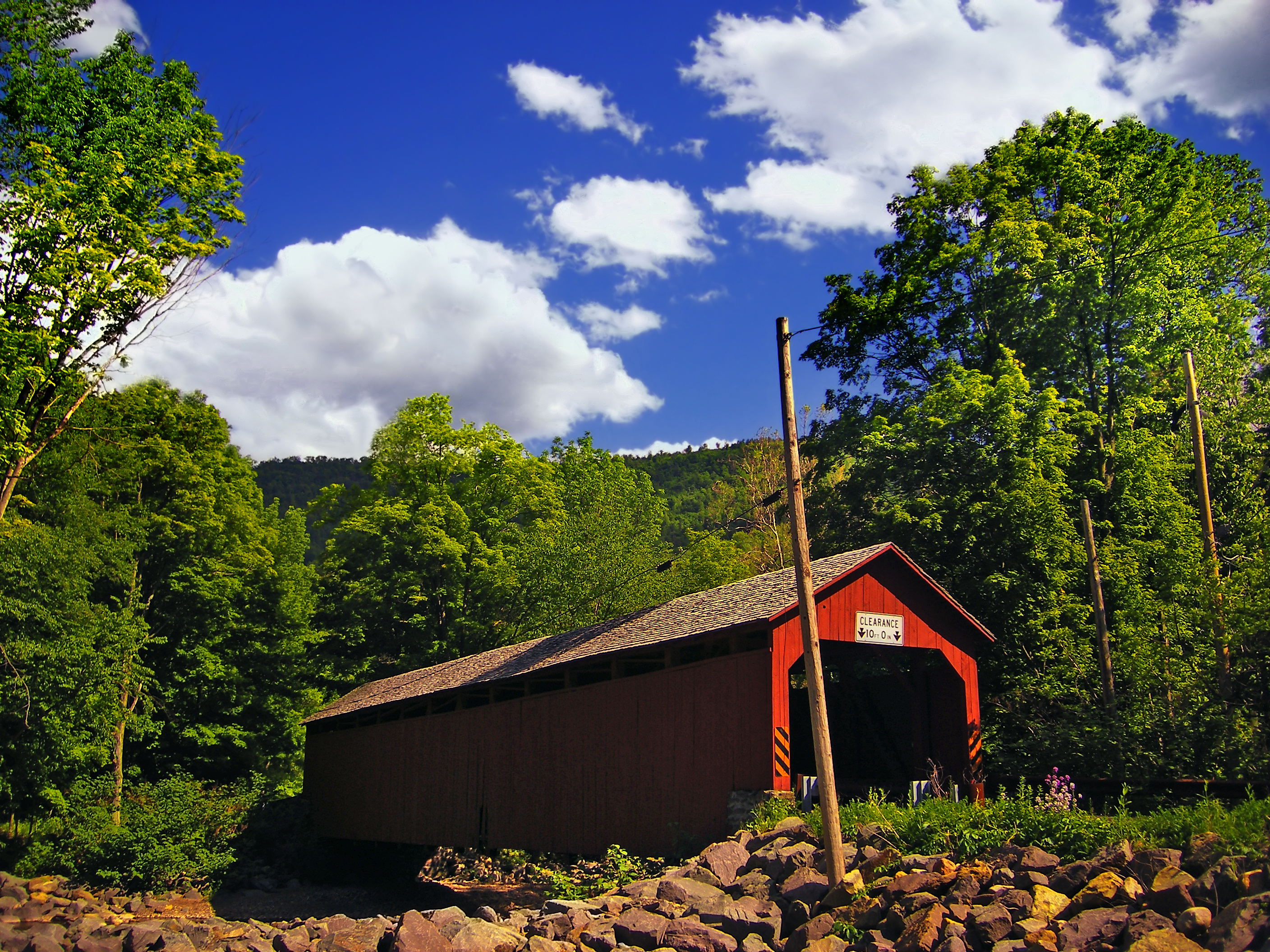
- The Sonestown Covered Bridge over Muncy Creek (west portal and north side in 2008)
- Coordinates: 41°20′47″N 76°33′18″W
- Carries: TR 310
- Crosses: Muncy Creek
- Locale: Sullivan County, Pennsylvania, US
- Official name: Sonestown Covered Bridge
- Other name: Davidson Covered Bridge
- Named for: Village of Sonestown
- Maintained by: Sullivan County
- NBI Number: 000000000032095

Characteristics
- Design: National Register of Historic Places
- Total length: 110 ft (34 m)
- Width: 15.0 ft (4.6 m)
- Height: 10.0 ft (3.0 m)
- Load limit: 3 tons (2.7 t)

History
- Built: c. 1850
- Rebuilt: 1969, 1996, 2001, 2005, 2013
- Sonestown Covered Bridge
- U.S. National Register of Historic Places
- MPS: Covered Bridges of Bradford, Sullivan and Lycoming Counties TR
- NRHP reference No.: 80003640
- Added to NRHP: July 24, 1980

Location
- Interactive map of Sonestown Covered Bridge

The Sonestown Covered Bridge is a covered bridge over Muncy Creek in Davidson Township, Sullivan County, Pennsylvania, United States. Built around 1850, it is 110 ft (34 m) long and was placed on the National Register of Historic Places (NRHP) in 1980. It is named for the nearby unincorporated village of Sonestown in Davidson Township, and is also known as the Davidson Covered Bridge. It was built to provide access to a grist mill which operated until the early 20th century.

Pennsylvania had the first covered bridge in the United States and has the most of any state in the 21st century. In most places, they were a transition between stone and metal bridges, with the roof and sides protecting the wooden structure from weather. The Sonestown bridge is a Burr arch truss type with a load-bearing arch sandwiching multiple vertical king posts for strength and rigidity. The bridge construction is cruder than the other two surviving covered bridges in Sullivan County, with each Burr arch formed from six straight beams set at angles instead of a smooth curve.

The bridge was repaired in 1969 and after flood damage in 1996, 2005, 2013, and 2020. It was also restored in 2001. Despite the repairs and restoration, however, the bridge structure's sufficiency rating on the National Bridge Inventory was only 21.3 percent in 2016, and its condition was deemed "basically intolerable requiring high priority of corrective action".^{[a]} It is the shortest covered bridge in the county, but as of 2020 is open only to pedestrian traffic.

== Overview ==
The covered bridge crosses Muncy Creek in Davidson Township on Champion Hill Road (Township Road 310), just east of U.S. Route 220. The village of Sonestown is 1 mile (1.6 km) north of the bridge on Route 220, giving the Sonestown Covered Bridge its name. The bridge is also 1 mile (1.6 km) east of the village of Muncy Valley along Route 220. Its official name on the NRHP is Sonestown Covered Bridge. It is also known as the Davidson Covered Bridge, for its township. Sullivan County is located in north-central Pennsylvania, about 123 miles (198 km) northwest of Philadelphia and 195 miles (314 km) east-northeast of Pittsburgh.

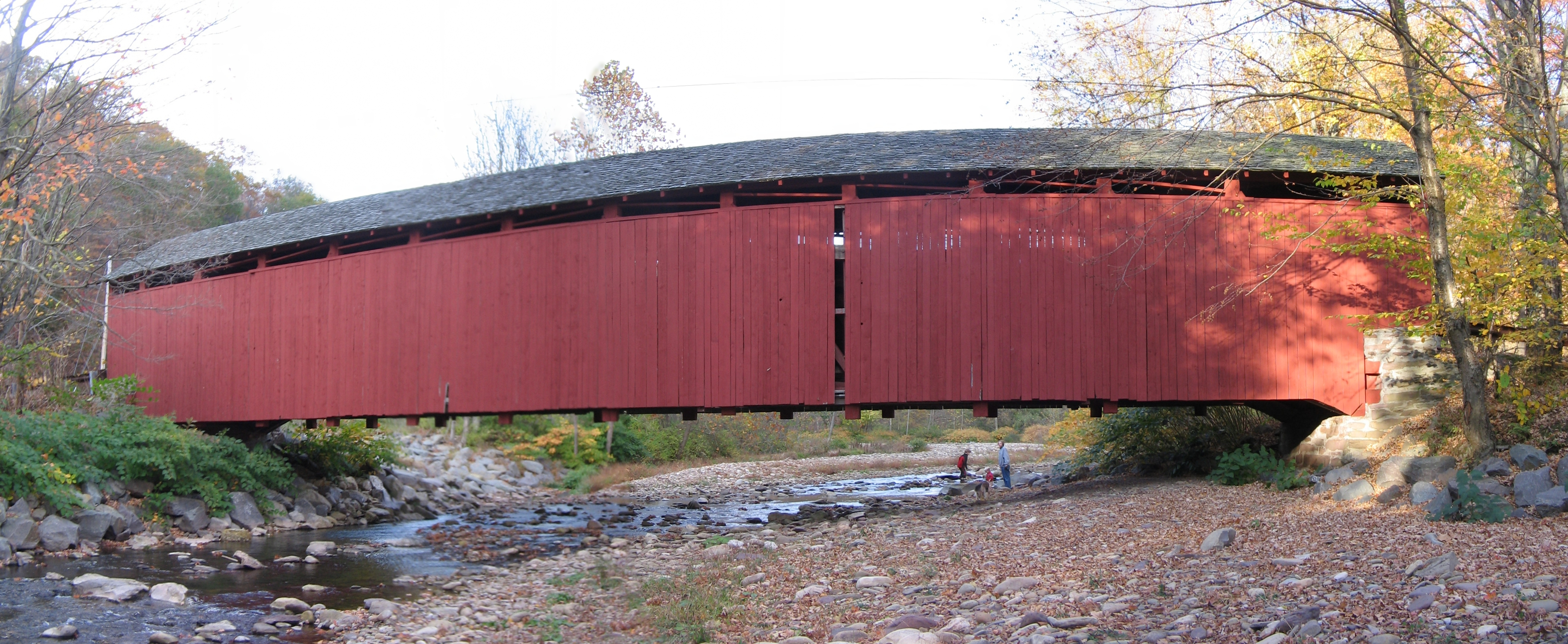
The south side of the bridge in October 2008

The area that became Davidson Township was first settled in 1806, and was incorporated as a township in 1833. Within the township, George Sones built a sawmill and founded the unincorporated village of Sonestown in 1843. All of these events occurred before Sullivan County was formed from part of Lycoming County on March 14, 1847. The bridge was built in 1850, and in the late 19th century Sonestown "boomed like crazy" as the lumber industry grew in Sullivan County. The village was then home to a plant that manufactured the staves for making barrels. It had a clothespin factory from 1903 to 1929 but lost almost all industry by the 1930s. As of 1996, Sonestown had a population of about 200, most of whom commuted to work in Muncy, Montoursville, and Williamsport. In 1996 the village had a few stores and an inn with a restaurant, attracting tourists and hunters.

== History ==
=== Background ===
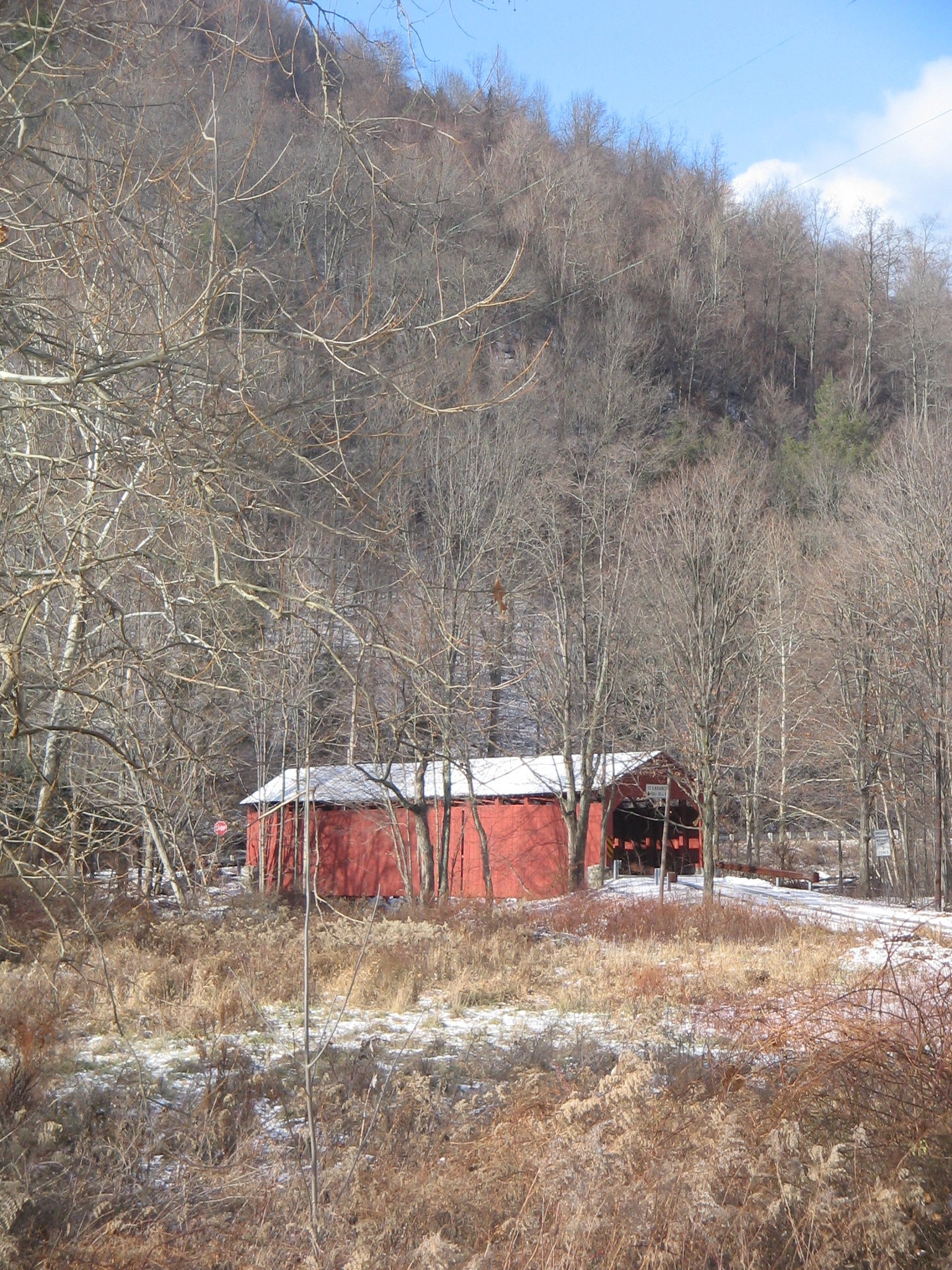
The south side and east portal of the bridge and site of the former mill in December 2008

The first covered bridge in the United States was built in 1800 over the Schuylkill River in Philadelphia. According to Susan M. Zacher, author of The Covered Bridges of Pennsylvania: A Guide, the first covered bridges of the Burr arch truss design were also built in the state. Pennsylvania is estimated to have once had at least 1,500 covered bridges and is believed to have had the most in the country between 1830 and 1875. In 2001, Pennsylvania had more surviving historic covered bridges than any other state, with 221 remaining in 40 of its 67 counties.

Covered bridges were a transition between stone and metal bridges, the latter made of cast iron or steel. In 19th-century Pennsylvania, lumber was an abundant resource for bridge construction, but wood did not last long when exposed to the elements. The roof and enclosed sides of covered bridges protected the structural elements, allowing some of these bridges to survive for well over a century. A Burr arch truss consists of a load-bearing arch sandwiching multiple king posts, resulting in a stronger and more rigid structure than one made of either element alone. Although there were 30 covered bridges in Sullivan County in 1890, only five were left by 1954, and as of 2020 only three remain: Forksville, Hillsgrove, and Sonestown.

=== Construction and description ===
All three Sullivan County covered bridges were built in or c. 1850 with Burr arch trusses. At the time of its construction, the Sonestown bridge was the fifth covered bridge in Sullivan County. The bridge crossed Muncy Creek to provide access to Johnny Hazen's gristmill, which was also built in 1850. Although most sources do not list the builder of the Sonestown bridge, two newspaper articles on the remaining Sullivan County covered bridges reported that Sadler Rogers (or Rodgers) had designed or possibly built it as well. Rogers, a native of Forksville, built both the Forksville and Hillsgrove bridges in 1850, when he was 18 years old. After the 2011 flood damage was restored, a plaque was placed on the bridge's west portal identifying Rogers as its builder.

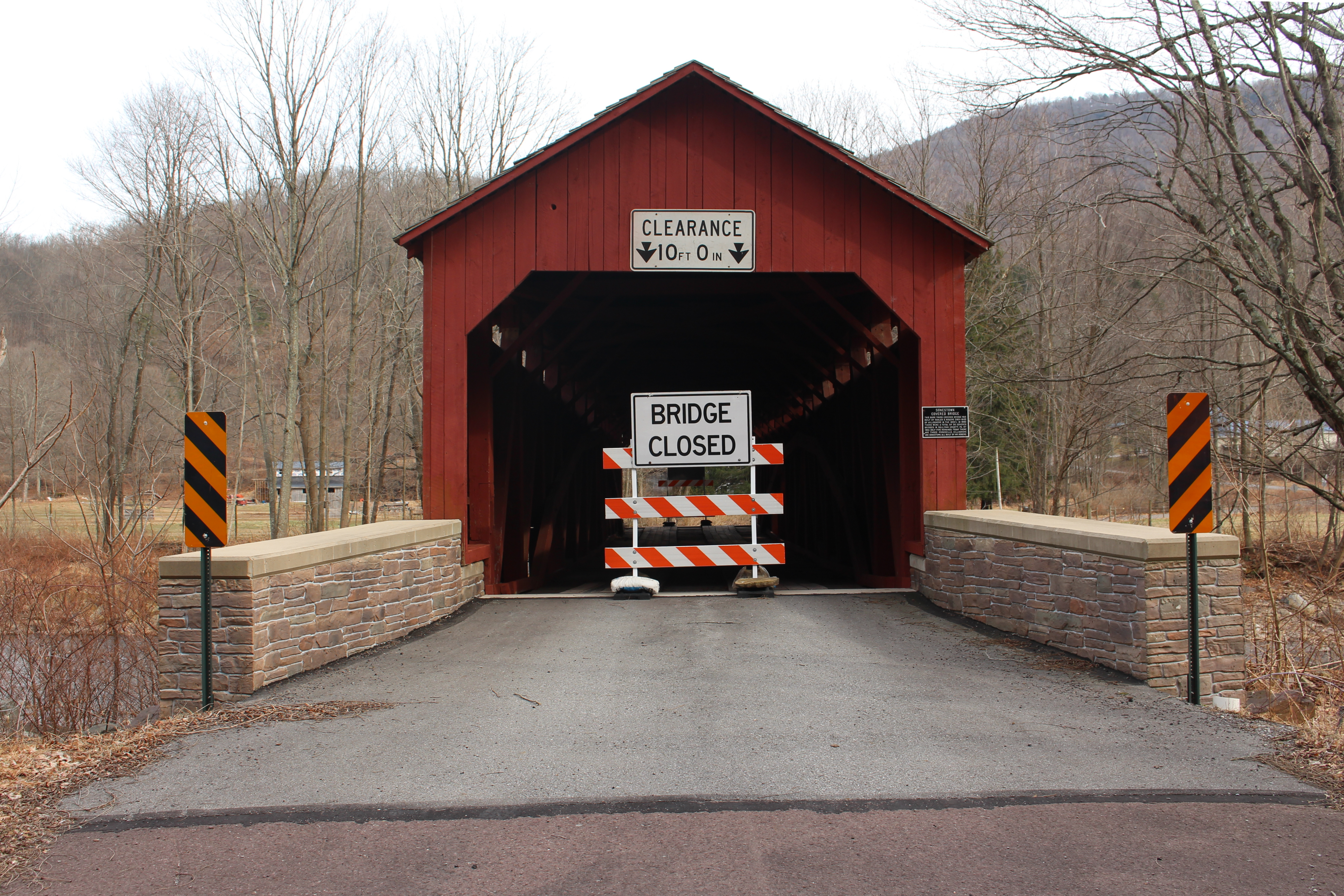
West portal of the closed bridge in 2020, with new wing walls and plaque added after the 2011 flood damage

On July 24, 1980, the Sonestown bridge was listed on the NRHP in a Multiple Property Submission of seven Covered Bridges of Bradford, Sullivan and Lycoming Counties. The Sonestown bridge is also on the 2016 Federal Highway Administration National Bridge Inventory (NBI), which lists the covered bridge as 110 ft (34 m) long, with a roadway 13 feet 6 inches (4.11 m) wide, and a maximum load of 5.0 short tons (4.5 t). However, the maximum load posted beside the bridge itself is only 3.0 short tons (2.7 t). According to the NRHP, the bridge's "road surface width" is 15 feet (4.6 m), which is only sufficient for a single lane of traffic.

According to the NRHP form, the Sonestown bridge "is of lighter construction than similar bridges in south-eastern Pennsylvania". The covered bridge rests on abutments of stone and mortar, which have been reinforced with concrete. The portals are flanked by wing walls below the level of the road; these extend out from the abutments at an angle and "retain the soil of the approach embankment".

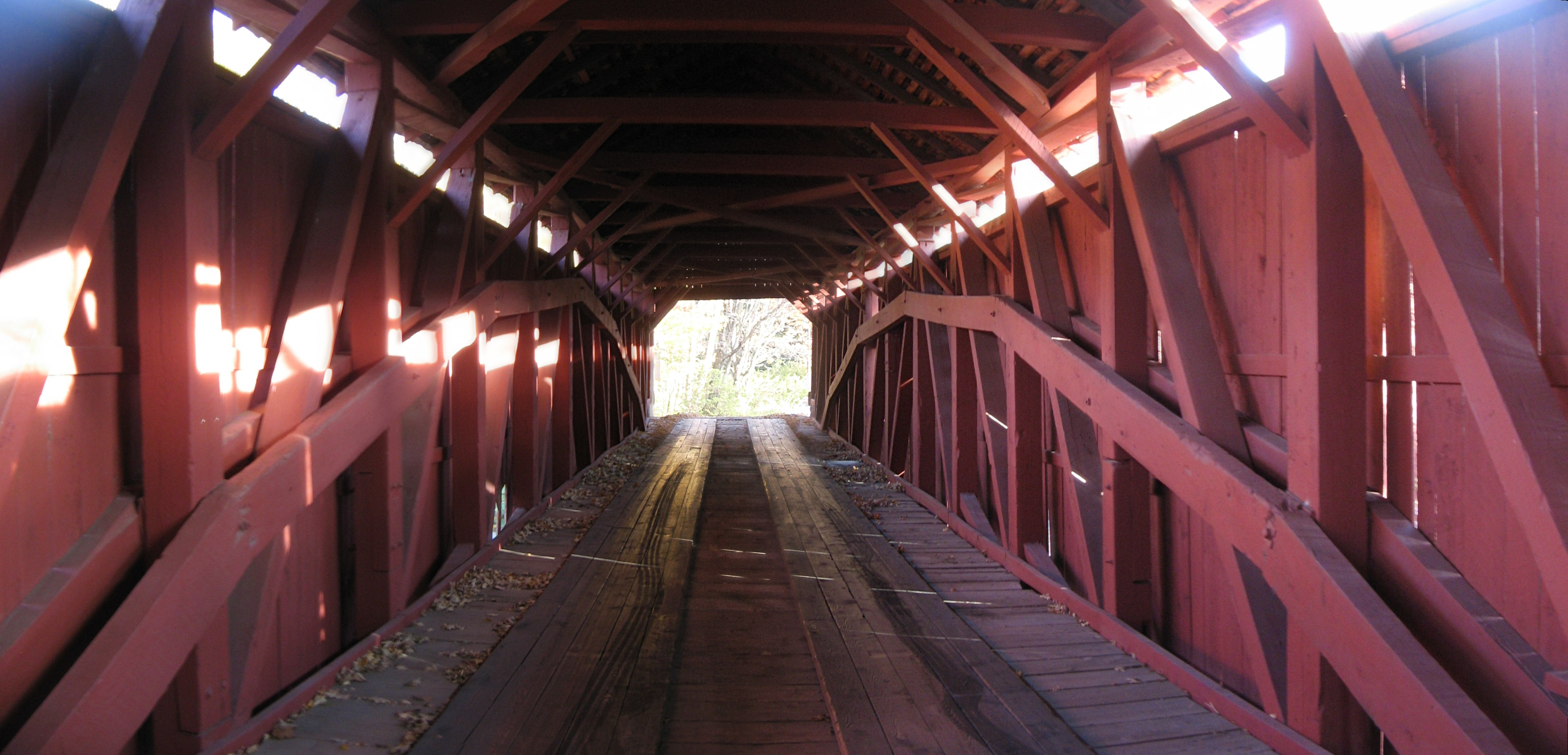
Bridge interior showing the angular Burr arches, with the arch on the left (north side) taller than that on the right (south side).

The bridge deck is made of wide boards laid perpendicular to the axis of the bridge, with two runners on top of the deck which run the length of the bridge. The Burr arches which support the bridge are cruder than those in the other two Sullivan County covered bridges; they are not smooth "continuous arcs, but several straight segments joined at an angle". The top of the Burr arch on the south (downstream) side of the bridge is noticeably lower than the top of the arch on the north (upstream) side.

Vertical boards cover the sides and portals of the bridge and are painted red. The bridge has openings between the eaves and the siding which run the length of the bridge on both sides. Since the 2013 restoration, it has a small window in the center of each side (it had no windows before). The gable roof is covered with wooden shake shingles. A sign listing the vertical clearance as 10 feet 0 inches (3.05 m) is posted above each portal. The bridge has no steel reinforcements.

Attitudes towards covered bridges in Sullivan County changed considerably in the last half of the 20th century. Two of the five bridges that remained in 1954 were razed by 1970, when the Pennsylvania Department of Transportation considered tearing down the Forksville bridge (but renovated it because of its historic nature and appeal to tourists). The Hillsgrove Covered Bridge was added to the NRHP in 1973, and the two other bridges were added in 1980. The Pennsylvania Historical and Museum Commission requires its approval for renovation work on NRHP bridges in the state, and forbids the destruction of these bridges.

=== Use, flooding, and restorations ===
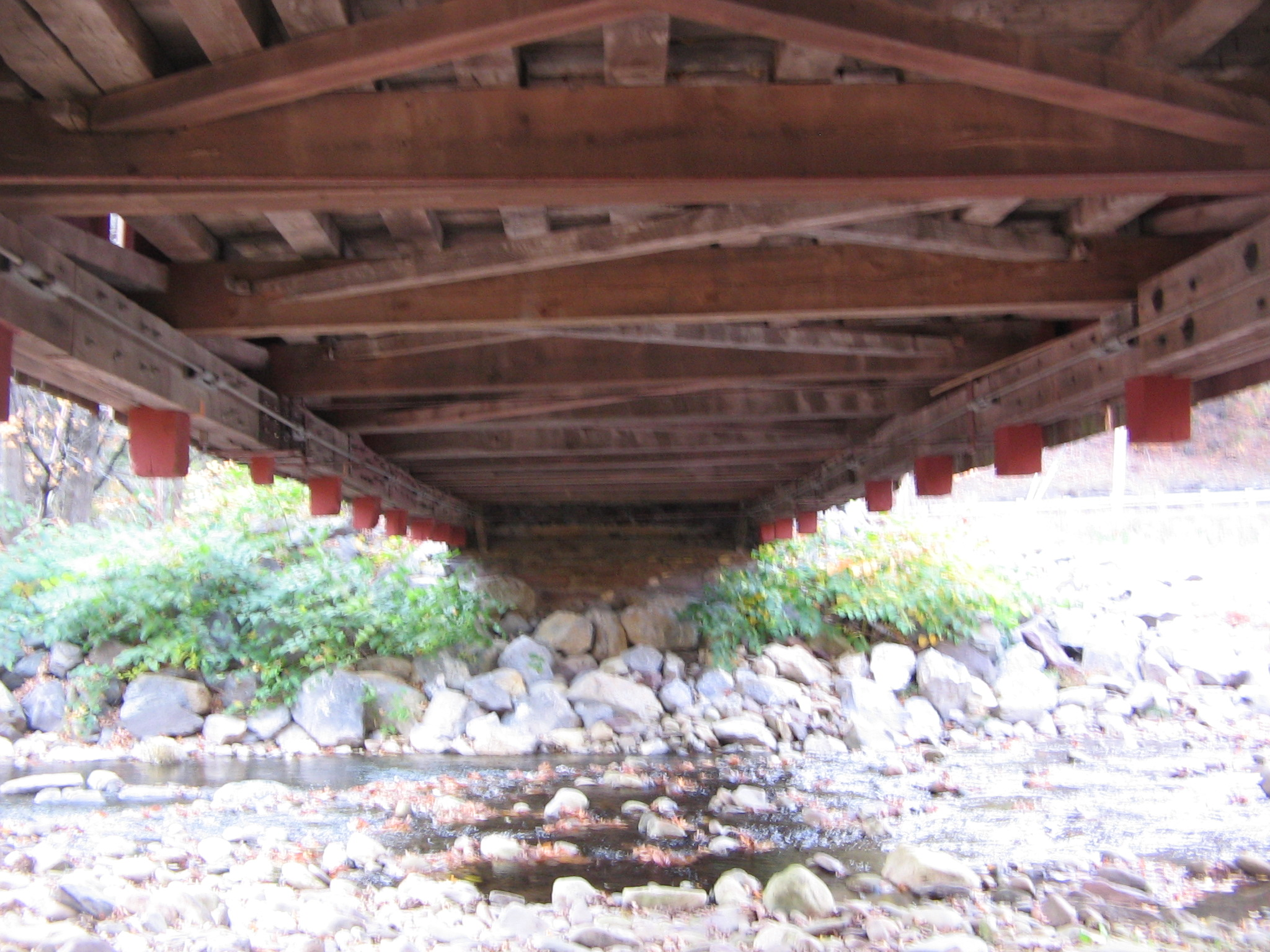
Underside of the bridge, with riprap (large rocks) protecting the west abutment

In the 19th century, the Sonestown Covered Bridge survived major floods on March 1, 1865 and June 1, 1889, that destroyed other bridges in the West Branch Susquehanna Valley. The latter flood was caused by the same storm system that caused the Johnstown Flood, which killed over 2,200 people. In 1885, the Williamsport and North Branch Railroad line along Muncy Creek reached Sonestown, passing just east of the bridge. The railroad carried lumber, coal, and passengers until it closed in 1938.

The covered bridge was built to provide access to a gristmill, and the 1915 state highway map of Sullivan County shows a mill just downstream of the bridge on the east bank of Muncy Creek. The 1941 map (using data from 1939) no longer shows a water-powered mill there, although it does show two buildings on the east bank of the creek, with one just upstream and one just downstream of the bridge. Both of these buildings had disappeared by 1999. The NRHP form states that the bridge had been recently repaired in 1969, and that additional maintenance work was needed. The repairs done at that time included replacing some of the siding panels, reinforcing the abutments with concrete, and "very minor addition of steel to the truss structure".

In January 1996, there was major flooding throughout Pennsylvania. A blizzard from January 6–8 produced up to 40 inches (100 cm) of snow, which was followed on January 19–21 by more than 3 inches (76 mm) of rain with temperatures as high as 62 °F (17 °C) and winds up to 38 miles per hour (61 km/h). The rain and snowmelt caused flooding throughout Pennsylvania, and ice jams made the flooding worse on many streams. In neighboring Lycoming County, flooding on Lycoming Creek in and near Williamsport killed six and caused millions of dollars in damage, and an ice jam on Plunketts Creek destroyed a mid-19th century stone arch bridge which was also on the NRHP.

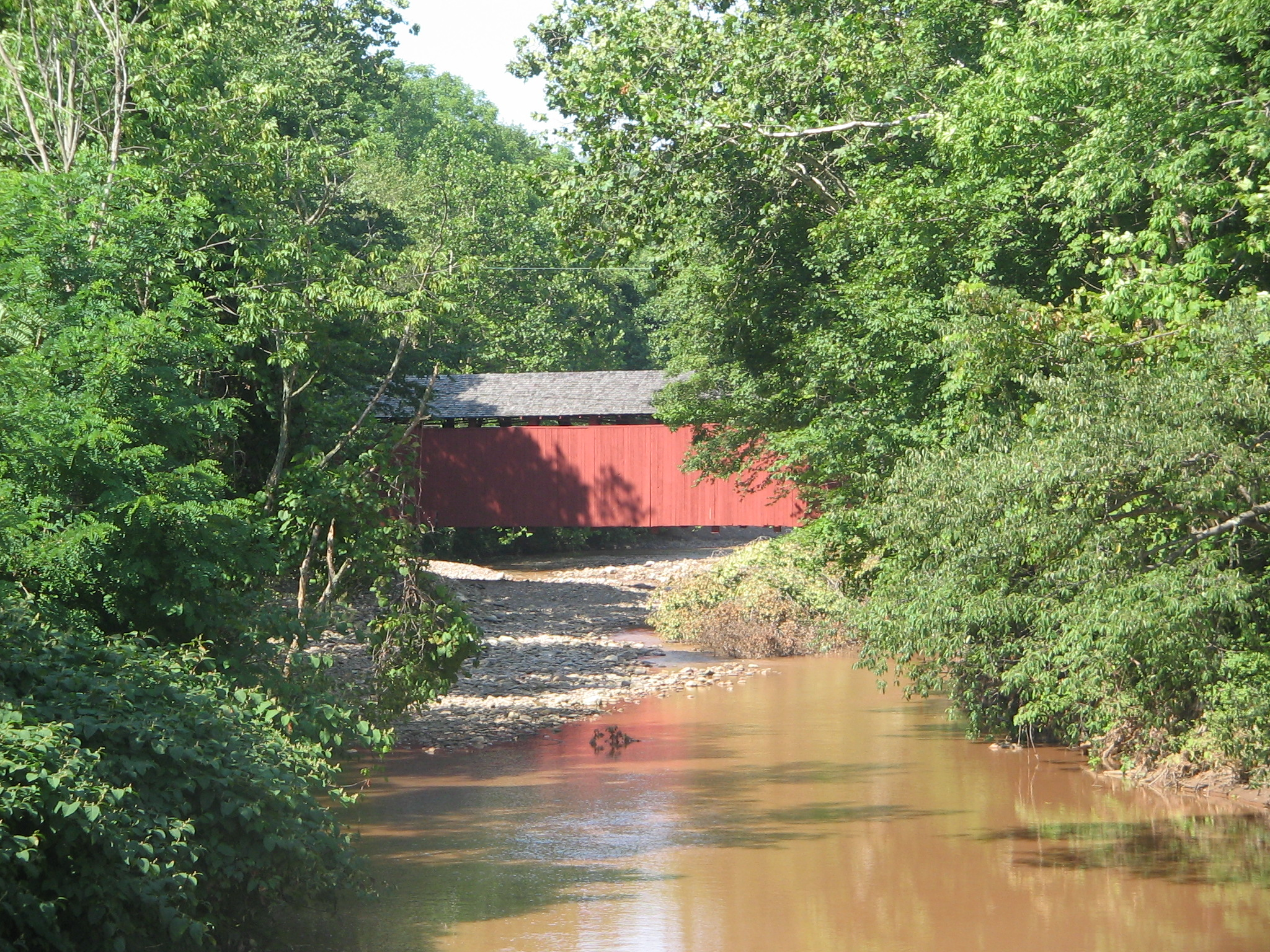
The covered bridge seen from the new bridge in August 2006, with muddy water from erosion prevention work being done upstream in Muncy Creek.

The pressure of the flood on the Sonestown Covered Bridge moved the center of the structure almost 1 foot (0.30 m) downstream. This and other major damage closed the bridge from January until late December 1996. It was one of 69 publicly owned bridges in Pennsylvania destroyed or closed by the flooding. Sullivan County owns the bridge and paid for its repair, which was mandated by the state since it is listed on the NRHP. The original bid was for $93,000, and the repair was done by Lycoming Supply Inc. of Williamsport for $89,000 over 60 days between mid-November and Christmas. The bridge's closure caused a 5-mile (8 km) detour for those who normally used the bridge to reach their homes and businesses.

Even after the repair was completed, vehicles that were heavier or larger than the bridge's original limits could not use it. Since beer trucks could not cross it, deliveries to the American Legion Post southeast of the bridge were made with a hand cart instead. On November 12, 2000, a new "Veterans Memorial Bridge" just downstream of the covered bridge was dedicated. The new bridge is also part of Champion Hill Road (Township Road 310), and allows all vehicles to cross Muncy Creek.

According to 2012 NBI data, the covered bridge was restored in 2001. In September 2004, flooding from Hurricane Ivan followed by heavy rains in April 2005 made a hole in one of the covered bridge's abutments and weakened a structural support. Repair work took six weeks and was done by mid-August 2005. August of that same year saw placement of riprap and fill in the creek to further protect the abutments, with the work done by Rexer's Drilling and Concrete of Dushore for $9,250. Erosion in September 2004 had destroyed a house 200 feet (61 m) upstream of the bridge, so the Sullivan County Commissioners planned additional work to stabilize the creek bed and prevent further erosion damage. The work, on private property and requiring permission from the Pennsylvania Department of Environmental Protection, was done in the summer of 2006.

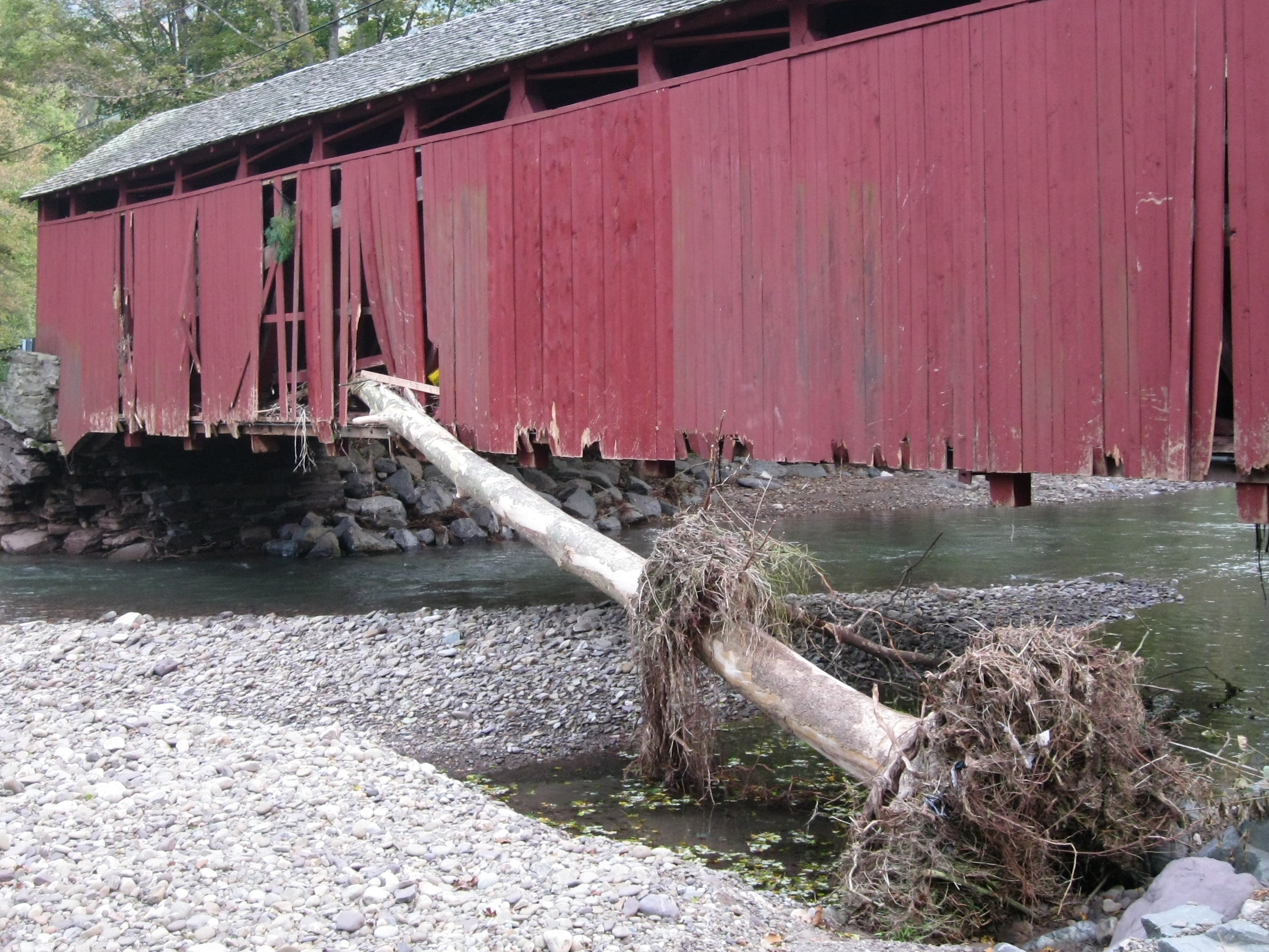
A tree in the north side of the bridge and other flood damage from the remnants of Tropical Storm Lee in September 2011.

The bridge was damaged when Muncy Creek flooded from over 12 inches (300 mm) of rainfall caused by Tropical Storm Lee on September 7, 2011. The bridge was struck by debris carried by the creek leaving a tree trunk stuck in its side, the flood water reached its deck, and several cars were swept beneath it. That year Preservation Pennsylvania placed the Sonestown and Hillsgrove covered bridges on its "Pennsylvania At Risk" listing of endangered historic sites. The bridge remained closed to traffic in March 2012, with the extent of needed repairs still unclear. The 2016 NBI shows the bridge was "reconstructed" in 2013. In August 2018 Sonestown was evacuated for flooding along Muncy Creek, the bridge was again closed by flood damage, with repairs expected in 2019. In July 2020, the Sullivan County Commissioners hired Lycoming Supply to repair the closed bridge for $116,559, using FEMA funding.

The NRHP form describes the bridge's condition as "fair" in 1969 and "good" in 1980. Zacher's 1994 book and the Evans 2001 book also listed it as in "good" condition. Despite this and the repairs and reconstruction, the 2016 NBI found the sufficiency rating of the bridge structure to be only 21.3 percent.^{[b]} It noted the countermeasures taken to help protect the bridge's foundations from scour conditions (the potential for the stream washing them out). The NBI rated the conditions of the bridges deck as "Good", its superstructure as "Satisfactory", and its substructure as "Very Good", but found that its railing "does not meet currently acceptable standards". Its overall condition was deemed "basically intolerable requiring high priority of corrective action".

In 1996, there was a tradition of decorating and lighting the Sonestown bridge for Christmas. In 2015, the average daily traffic on the bridge was 50 vehicles. As of 2020, it was the only remaining covered bridge over Muncy Creek, although the Muncy Creek watershed also had the Lairdsville Covered Bridge, which spanned Little Muncy Creek in Lycoming County. According to Zacher, the "Sullivan County bridges, because of their settings, are some of the most attractive in the state".

== Dimensions ==
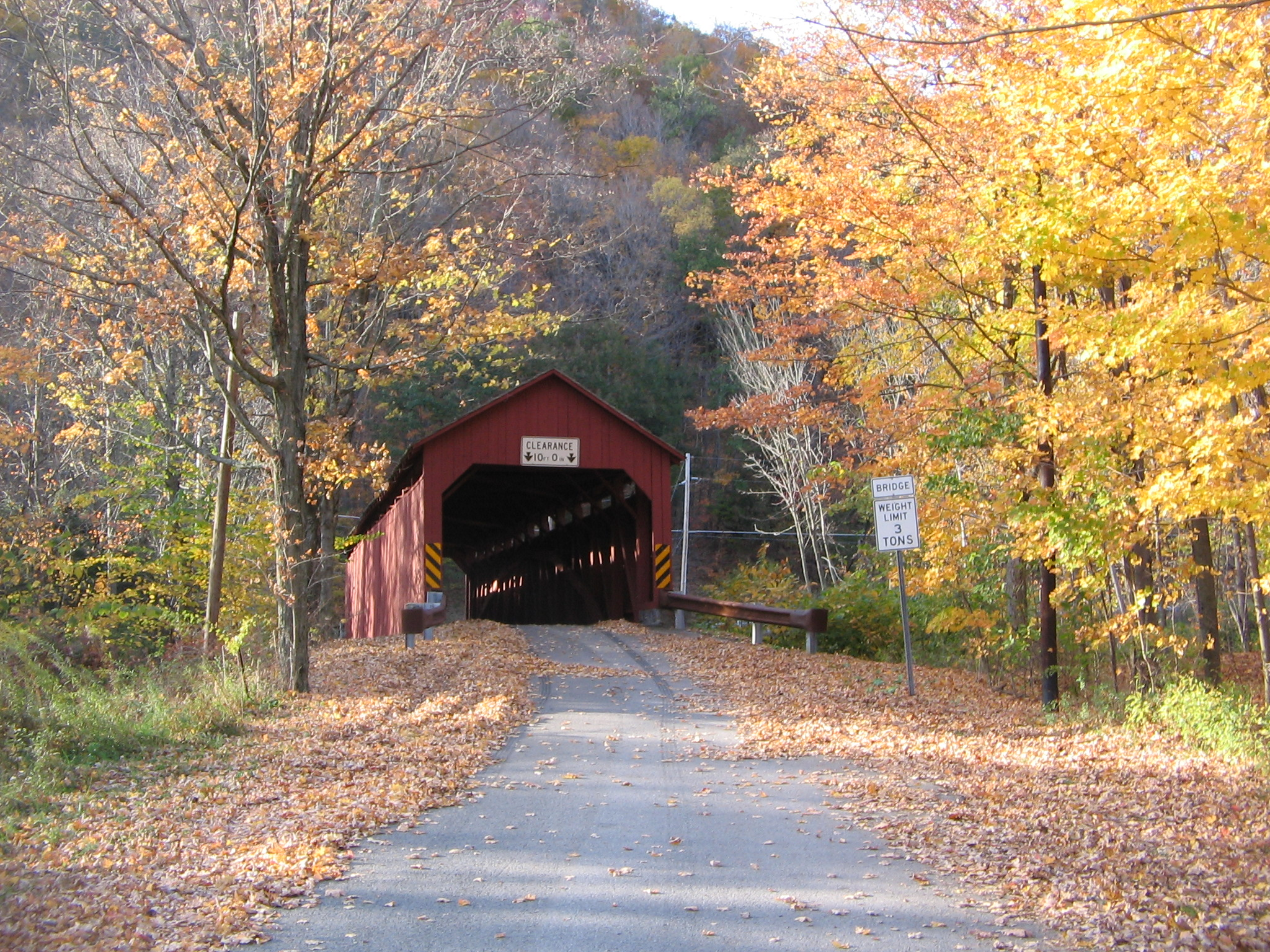
The east portal and south side of the bridge, with posted weight and clearance limits

The following table is a comparison of published measurements of length, width and load recorded in different sources using different methods, as well as the name or names cited. The NBI measures bridge length between the "backwalls of abutments" or the pavement grooves at the opposite ends of the bridge. It defines the roadway width as "the most restrictive minimum distance between curbs or rails". The NRHP form was prepared by the Pennsylvania Historical and Museum Commission (PHMC), which surveyed county engineers, historical and covered bridge societies, and others for all the covered bridges in the commonwealth. The Evans visited every covered bridge in Pennsylvania in 2001 and measured each bridge's length (portal to portal) and width (at the portal) for their book. The data in Zacher's book was based on a 1991 survey of all covered bridges in Pennsylvania by the PHMC and the Pennsylvania Department of Transportation, aided by local government and private agencies. The article uses primarily the NBI and NRHP data, as they are national programs.

Length feet (m)	Width feet (m)	Load short tons (MT)	Name used	Source (Year)
110 ft (34 m)	13 feet 6 inches (4.11 m)	5.0 short tons (4.5 t)	Sonestown	NBI (2012)
99 feet (30 m)	15 feet (4.6 m)	3.0 short tons (2.7 t)	Sonestown	NRHP (1980)
118 feet 9 inches (36.2 m)	14 feet 6 inches (4.42 m)	NA	Sonestown	Evans (2001)
102 feet (31 m)	15 feet (4.6 m)	NA	Sonestown	Zacher (1994)

== See also ==
- List of bridges on the National Register of Historic Places in Pennsylvania

== Notes ==
a. The National Bridge Inventory (NBI) is published each year in January by the National Highway Administration, using data submitted by state highway agencies which they collected during the preceding year. The official NBI is published only in a machine-readable format, the only free, user-friendly version is at least a year out of date, so easily accessible NBI data is two or more years old.
b. The National Highway Administration established the sufficiency rating, which can vary from a low of 0 to a high of 100, as a way to prioritize federal funding for bridges. The rating is calculated for bridges over 20 feet (6.1 m) long, based on "structural adequacy, whether the bridge is functionally obsolete, and level of service provided to the public". Federal funds are available for replacement of bridges with a rating of 50 or below, while those with a rating of 80 or below qualify for rehabilitation. In 2013, Pennsylvania had 22,659 bridges on the NBI, of which 42.2 percent were either structurally deficient (23.0 percent) or functionally obsolete (19.2 percent).
