= List of covered bridges in Bradford, Sullivan, and Lycoming counties, Pennsylvania =

- Covered Bridges of Bradford, Sullivan and Lycoming Counties TR
- U.S. National Register of Historic Places
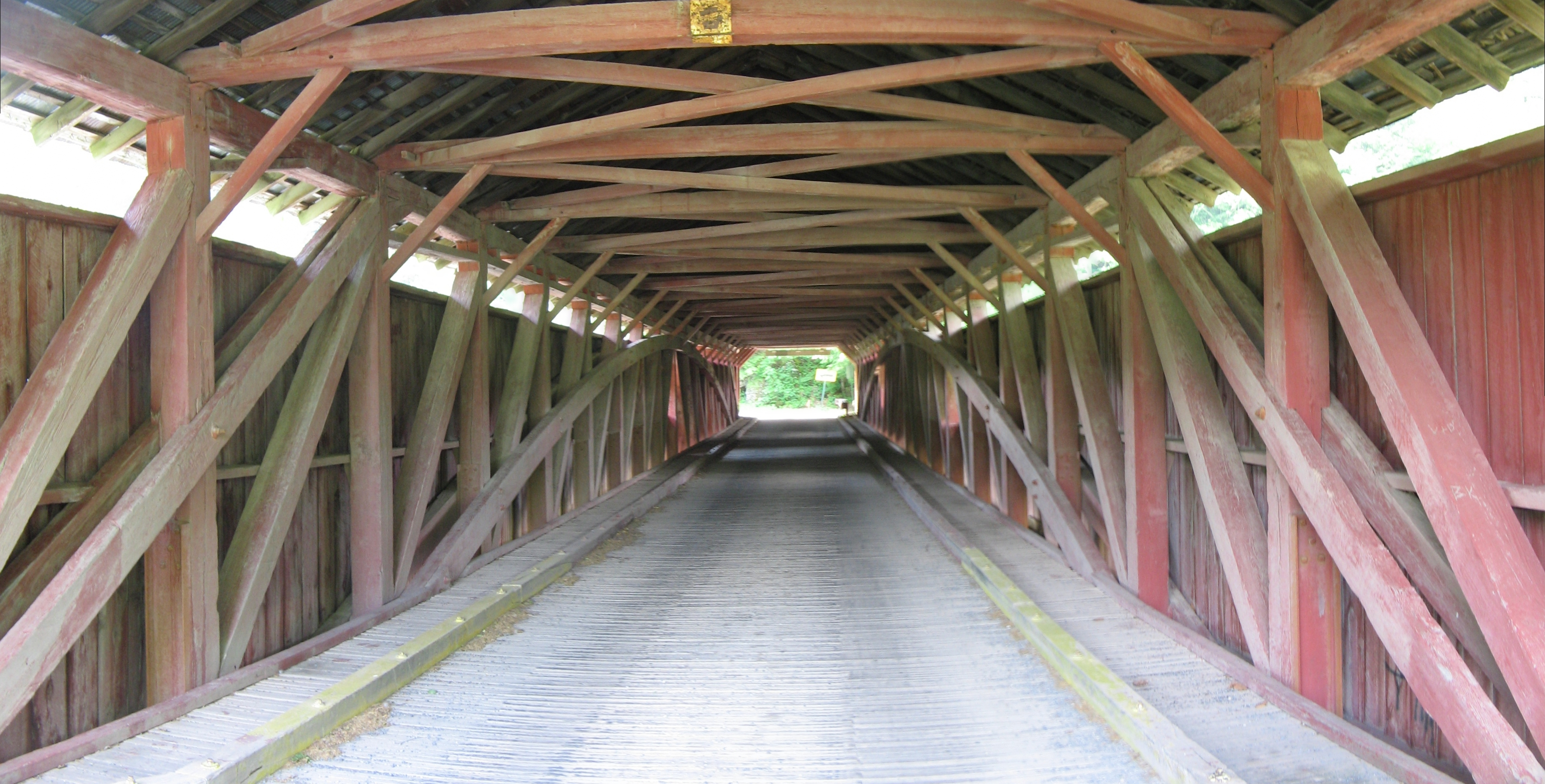
- Interior of Hillsgrove Covered Bridge in Sullivan County, Pennsylvania
- Location: Bradford, Lycoming, and Sullivan Counties Pennsylvania, USA
- Built: 1850–1898
- Architectural style: Burr Arch Covered Bridge
- MPS: Covered Bridges of Bradford, Sullivan and Lycoming Counties TR
- NRHP reference No.: 64000708
- Added to NRHP: July 24, 1980

The Covered Bridges of Bradford, Sullivan and Lycoming Counties are seven covered bridges in northcentral Pennsylvania in the United States, which were included on the National Register of Historic Places (NRHP) in a Thematic Resources submission on July 24, 1980. One of the bridges is in Bradford County, and three each are in Lycoming and Sullivan counties. The Sullivan County bridges are the oldest as all three were built in or circa 1850, while the 1898 Buttonwood Covered Bridge in Lycoming County is the youngest. The Buttonwood bridge is also the shortest at 63 feet 6 inches (19.35 m), while the Hillsgrove Covered Bridge in Sullivan County is longest at 171 feet (52 m). On July 2, 1973, the Hillsgrove bridge was the first of the seven to be added to the NRHP, and it was the only one so listed before the Thematic Resources submission.

| Name of bridge | Year built | County and Township | Length feet (m) | Stream crossed | Photograph |
|---|---|---|---|---|---|
| Buttonwood | 1898 | Lycoming County, Jackson Township | 63 feet 6 inches (19.4 m) | Blockhouse Creek | |
| Cogan House | 1877 | Lycoming County, Cogan House Township | 93 feet (28.3 m) | Larrys Creek | |
| Forksville | 1850 | Sullivan County, Forks Township | 146 feet (44.5 m) | Loyalsock Creek | |
| Hillsgrove | 1850 | Sullivan County, Hillsgrove Township | 171 feet (52.1 m) | Loyalsock Creek | |
| Knapp's | 1853 | Bradford County, Burlington Township | 95 feet (29.0 m) | Browns Creek | |
| Lairdsville | 1888 | Lycoming County, Moreland Township | 77 feet 10 inches (23.7 m) | Little Muncy Creek | |
| Sonestown | 1850 | Sullivan County, Davidson Township | 99 feet (30.2 m) | Muncy Creek | |

== See also ==
- List of bridges on the National Register of Historic Places in Pennsylvania
