= Sadler Rogers =

American bridge engineer (1831–1913)

- Born: Sadler S. Rogers; September 22, 1831; Forksville, Pennsylvania
- Died: February 25, 1913 (aged 81); Millview, Pennsylvania
- Other name: Sadler Rodgers
- Occupations: Farmer; Builder; County Commissioner, Sullivan County, Pennsylvania
- Known for: Design and construction of Pennsylvania covered bridges

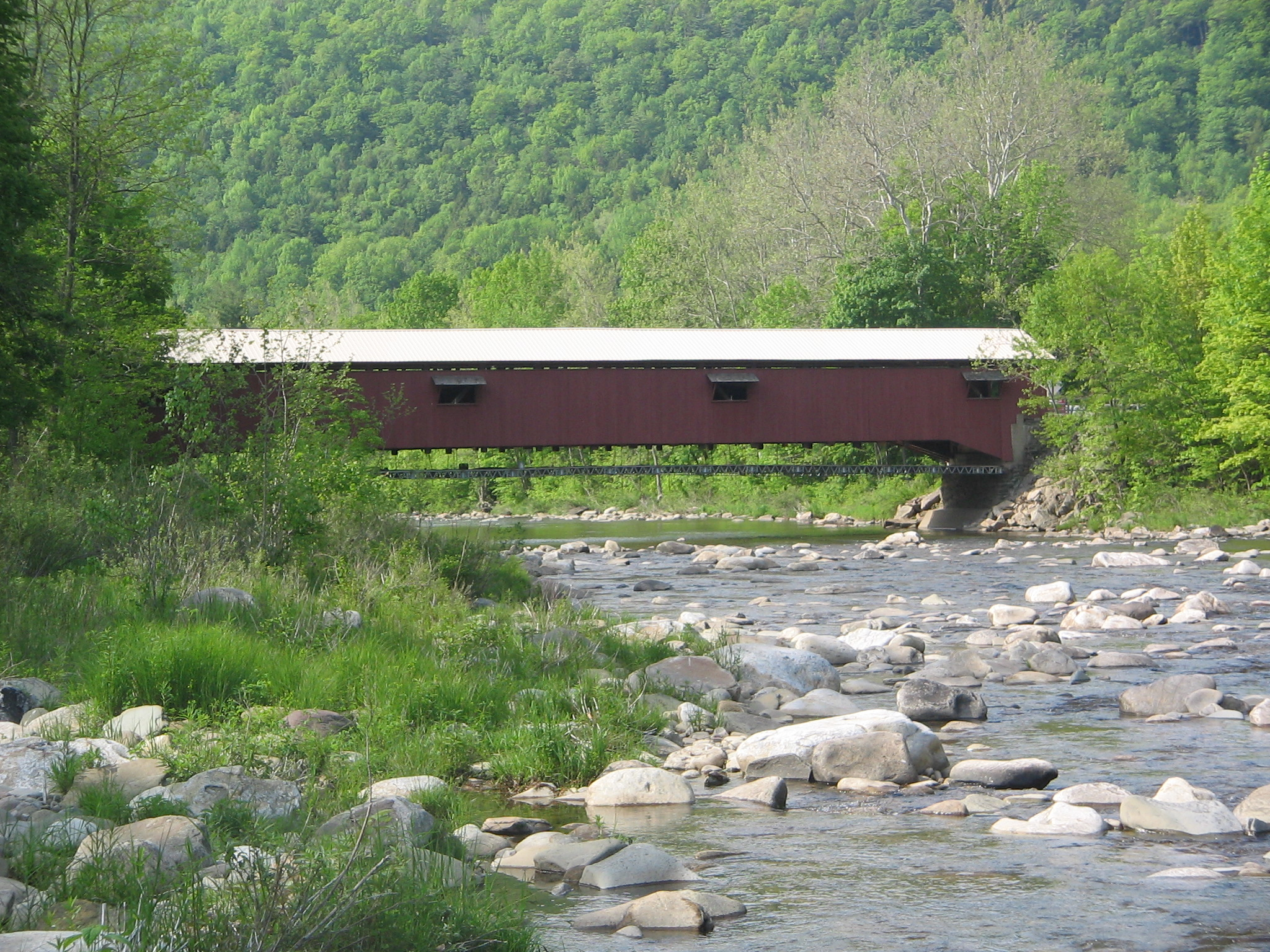
Forksville Covered Bridge

Sadler S. Rogers (also spelled Rodgers; September 22, 1831—February 25, 1913) was an American builder and farmer. Sadler Rogers built several bridges which are now considered part of the historic heritage of Pennsylvania, including the Forksville Covered Bridge, which he constructed in 1850 at the age of 18, and the Sonestown Covered Bridge.

He died in his home in Millview, Pennsylvania on February 25, 1913.
