= Plunketts Creek (Loyalsock Creek tributary) =

River in the US state of Pennsylvania

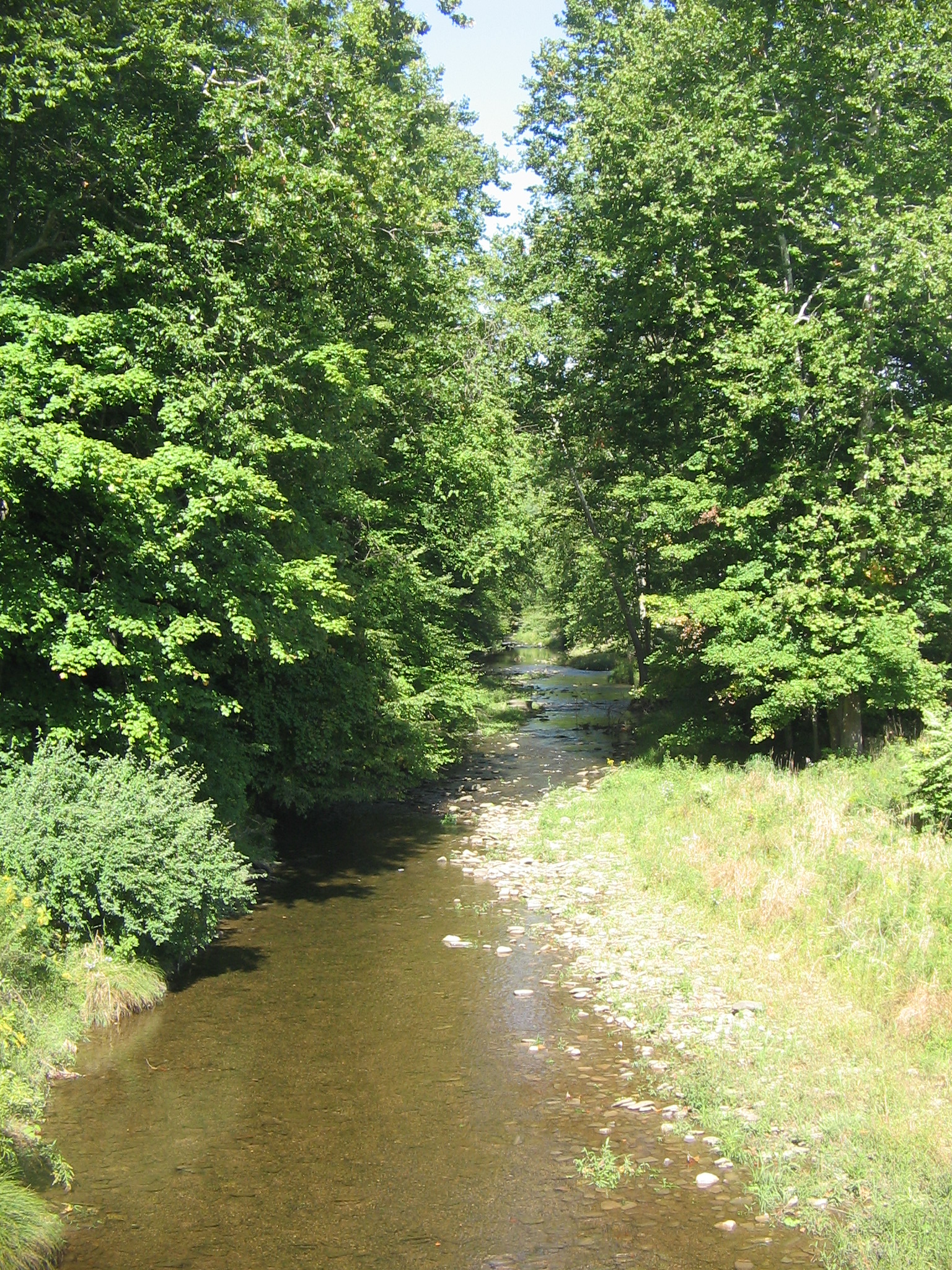
- Plunketts Creek looking upstream, just north of the mouth in Plunketts Creek Township

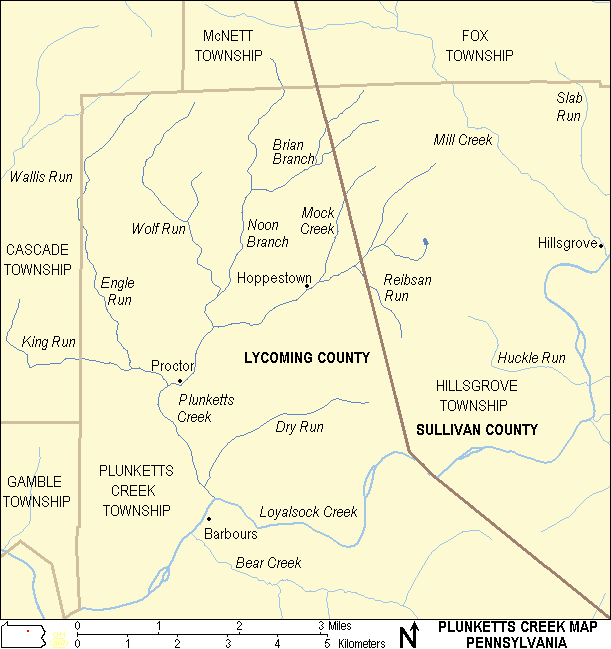
- Map of Plunketts Creek showing named tributaries and settlements along the creek

- Location of the mouth of Plunketts Creek in Lycoming County, Pennsylvania

Location
- Country: United States
- State: Pennsylvania
- Counties: Lycoming, Sullivan

Physical characteristics
- Source: Loyalsock State Forest
  - location: Near Hillsgrove, Hillsgrove Township, Sullivan County, Pennsylvania
  - coordinates: 41°26′41″N 76°44′48″W
  - elevation: 1,440 ft (440 m)
- Mouth: Loyalsock Creek
  - location: Barbours, Plunketts Creek Township, Lycoming County, Pennsylvania
  - coordinates: 41°23′55″N 76°47′45″W
  - elevation: 725 ft (221 m)
- Length: 6.2 mi (10.0 km)
- Basin size: 23.6 sq mi (61 km^{2})

Plunketts Creek is an approximately 6.2-mile-long (10 km) tributary of Loyalsock Creek in Lycoming and Sullivan counties in the U.S. state of Pennsylvania. Two unincorporated villages and a hamlet are on the creek, and its watershed drains 23.6 square miles (61 km^{2}) in parts of five townships. The creek is a part of the Chesapeake Bay drainage basin via Loyalsock Creek and the West Branch Susquehanna and Susquehanna Rivers.

Plunketts Creek's name comes from the first owner of the land including the creek's mouth, and the creek has given its name to two townships (although one has since changed its name). The creek flows southwest and then south through the dissected Allegheny Plateau, through rock from the Mississippian sub-period and Devonian period. Much of the Plunketts Creek valley is composed of various glacial deposits, chiefly alluvium.

Although the Plunketts Creek watershed was clear-cut and home to a tannery, sawmills, and a coal mine in the nineteenth century, today it is heavily wooded and known for its high water quality, fishing, and other recreational opportunities. The watershed now includes parts of the Loyalsock State Forest, Pennsylvania State Game Lands, and a State Game Farm for raising pheasant. Tourism, hunting, and fishing have long been important in the region, and the year-round population of Plunketts Creek Township is increasing much faster than that of either Lycoming or Sullivan County.

== Name ==
Plunketts Creek is named for Colonel William Plunkett, a physician, who was the first president judge of Northumberland County after it was formed in 1772. During conflicts with Native Americans, he treated wounded settlers and fought the natives. Plunkett led a Pennsylvania expedition in the Pennamite–Yankee War to forcibly remove settlers from Connecticut, who had claimed and settled on lands also claimed by Pennsylvania. For his services, Plunkett was granted six tracts of land totaling 1,978 acres (8.00 km^{2}) on November 14, 1776, although the land was not actually surveyed until September 1783. Plunkett's land included the creek's mouth, so Plunketts Creek was given his name.

During the American Revolution, Plunkett did not actively support the revolution and thus was suspected of being sympathetic to the British Empire. He died in 1791, aged about 100, and was buried in Northumberland, without a grave marker or monument (except for the creek that bears his name). Lycoming County was formed from Northumberland County in 1795. When Plunketts Creek Township was formed in Lycoming County in 1838, the original name proposed was "Plunkett Township" but the lingering suspicions of his British sympathies led to that name being rejected. Naming the township for the creek was an acceptable compromise.

Plunketts Creek Township was originally much larger than it is now, and two other townships were formed from parts of it. When Sullivan County was formed from Lycoming County on March 15, 1847, Plunketts Creek Township was divided between the counties, with each having a township of the same name. This led to some confusion and in 1856 the citizens of Sullivan County petitioned the state legislature to change the name of their Plunketts Creek Township to Hillsgrove Township, for Hillsgrove, the main village and post office in the township. In 1866, Cascade Township was formed from parts of Hepburn and Plunketts Creek Townships in Lycoming County.

According to Meginness (1892), Colonel Plunkett actually spelled his last name "Plunket", but the current spelling was established "by custom and the courts". As of 2018, it is the only stream officially named "Plunketts Creek" on USGS maps of the United States and in the USGS Geographic Names Information System. (There is a "Plunkett Creek" in Tennessee which has "Plunketts Creek" as an official variant name). The possessive apostrophe is not part of the official name of the creek, although records from the 19th century often spell it as "Plunkett's Creek". No Native American name for Plunketts Creek is known. Two streams in the watershed have given their names to roads in Plunketts Creek Township: Engle Run Drive and Mock Run Road.

== Course ==
The source of Plunketts Creek is 1440 ft (439 m) above sea level, northwest of the unincorporated village of Hillsgrove and just south of the Loyalsock State Forest in Hillsgrove Township, Sullivan County. The source is a pond just north of Pennsylvania Route 4010 (the road between the villages of Proctor and Hillsgrove) and Plunketts Creek crosses the road twice, then receives two unnamed tributaries on the right bank as it flows generally southwest about 1.5 miles (2.4 km) to the Lycoming County line.

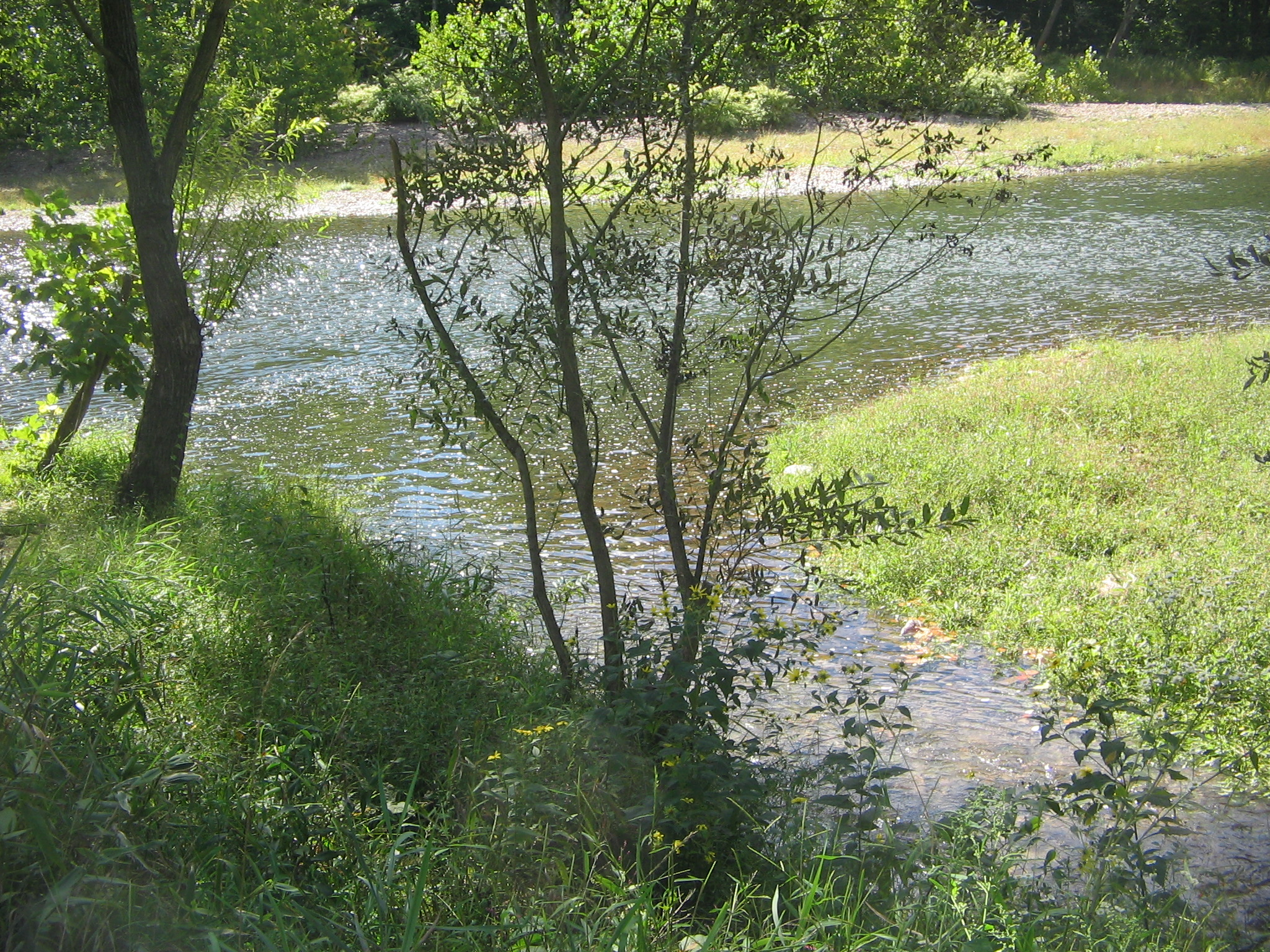
The confluence of Plunketts Creek (foreground) with the much larger Loyalsock Creek in the village of Barbours.

The creek continues southwest as it enters Plunketts Creek Township and receives Reibsan Run on the left bank, 4.70 miles (7.56 km^{2}) upstream from the mouth. It next receives Mock Creek at the hamlet of Hoppestown (4.24 miles (6.82 km) from the mouth), then Wolf Run (2.72 miles (4.38 km) from the mouth), both on the right bank. At the village of Proctor, Plunketts Creek receives King Run (1.66 miles (2.67 km)) on the right bank, then turns south towards Loyalsock Creek. It flows through the Pennsylvania Game Commission's Northcentral Game Farm, then receives the unnamed tributary in Coal Mine Hollow on the right bank and Dry Run on the left bank (0.82 miles (1.32 km) and 0.17 miles (0.27 km), respectively). It finally enters the village of Barbours, where its mouth is on the right bank of Loyalsock Creek at 725 feet (221 m).

Lycoming County is about 130 miles (209 km) northwest of Philadelphia and 165 miles (266 km) east-northeast of Pittsburgh. Although Plunketts Creek is 6.2 miles (10.0 km) long,} the direct distance between the source and the mouth is only 4.1 miles (6.6 km). From the mouth of Plunketts Creek it is 19.50 miles (31.38 km^{2}) along Loyalsock Creek to its confluence with the West Branch Susquehanna River at Montoursville. The elevation at the source is 1440 feet (439 m), while the mouth is at an elevation of 725 feet (221 m). The difference in elevation, 715 feet (218 m), divided by the length of the creek of 6.2 miles (10.0 km) gives the average drop in elevation per unit length of creek or relief ratio of 115.3 feet/mile (21.8 m/km). For comparison, the relief ratio of Wallis Run (the next watershed to the southwest) is 110.9 feet/mile (21.0 m/km), while Loyalsock Creek's is only 28.0 feet/mile (5.33 m/km).

=== Floods ===
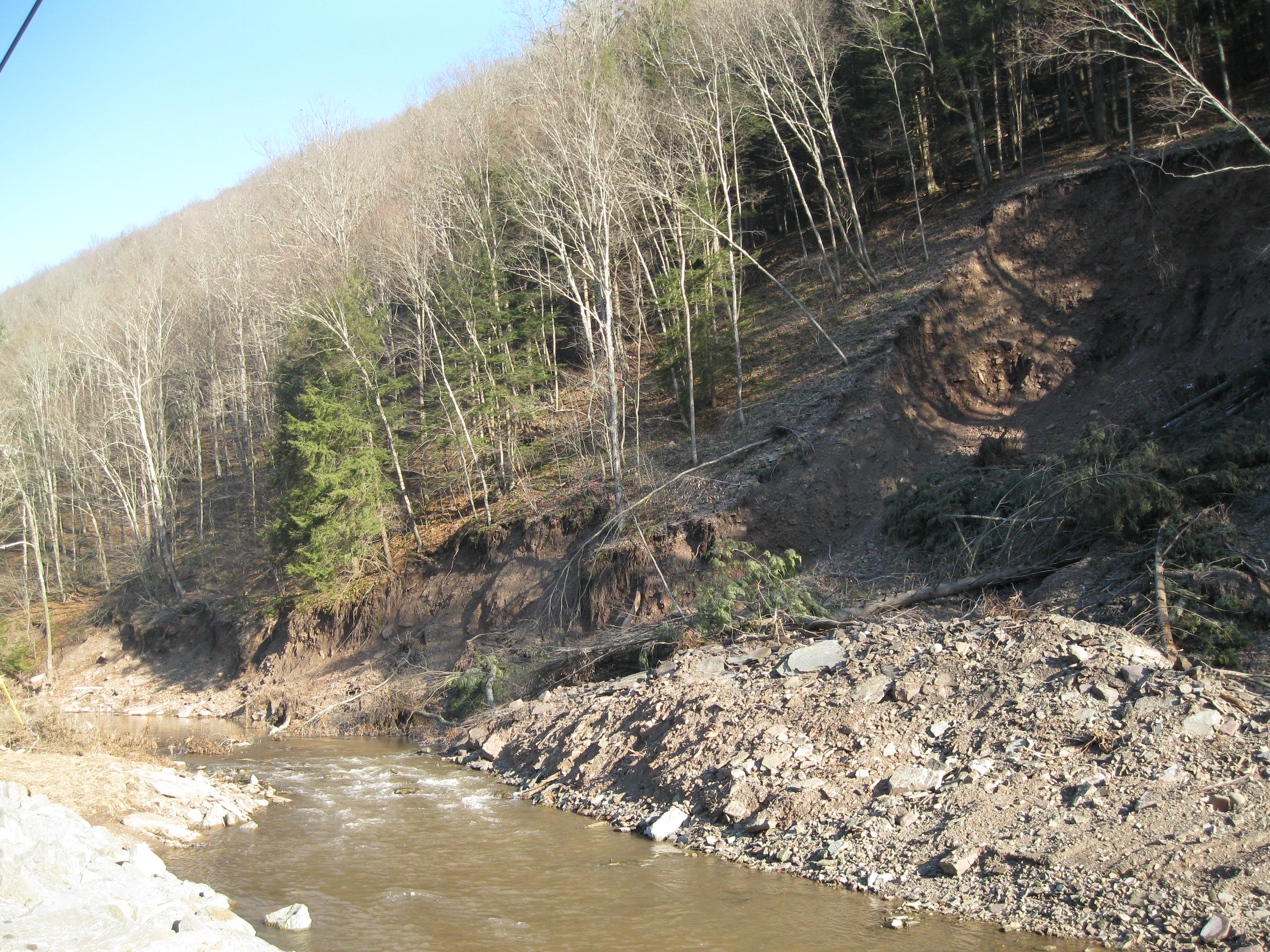
Stream bank erosion and landslide north of Plunketts Creek Bridge No. 2, from the September 2011 flood

Plunketts Creek can vary greatly in depth, depending on the season and recent precipitation. Its water level is typically highest (perhaps 3 feet (1 m) deep) in spring or for a few days after a heavy rain, and lowest in late summer, when it can shrink to a trickle. While there is no stream gauge on Plunketts Creek, a rough estimate of the creek's water level may be found from the stream gauge on the Loyalsock Creek bridge in Barbours, just downstream of the mouth. Lycoming County operates this gauge as part of the county-wide flood warning system. It only measures the water height (not discharge), and measured a record gauge height of 34 feet (10 m) on September 7, 2011.

The September 2011 flood was caused by remnants of Tropical Storm Lee, which dumped 11.36 inches (289 mm) of rainfall in the nearby village of Shunk in Fox Township in Sullivan County (just north of the creek's source). The 2011 flooding caused widespread damage in Proctor and Barbours and destroyed a small stone bridge on Wallis Run Road in Proctor over King Run, a tributary of Plunketts Creek. The Barbours Fire Hall became an "emergency relief center offering food, shelter and supplies to victims of the flood". Further downstream on the Loyalsock, the flooding badly damaged the historic Hillsgrove Covered Bridge, washed out sections of Pennsylvania Route 87 along the creek, and destroyed the Pennsylvania Route 973 and Lycoming Valley Railroad bridges over the creek near and in Montoursville.

The previous record flood reached 24.9 feet (7.6 m) on the Loyalsock flood gauge at Barbours on January 19–20, 1996. This major flood resulted from heavy rain, snow melt, and ice dams, which caused millions of dollars of damage throughout Lycoming County, and six deaths on Lycoming Creek in and near Williamsport. On Plunketts Creek, the flood heavily damaged and later caused the demolition of Plunketts Creek Bridge No. 3, a mid-19th century stone arch bridge listed on the National Register of Historic Places. The flood waters were 4 feet (1.2 m) deep in Barbours and it was called the village's "worst flood in history" at the time.

== Geology ==
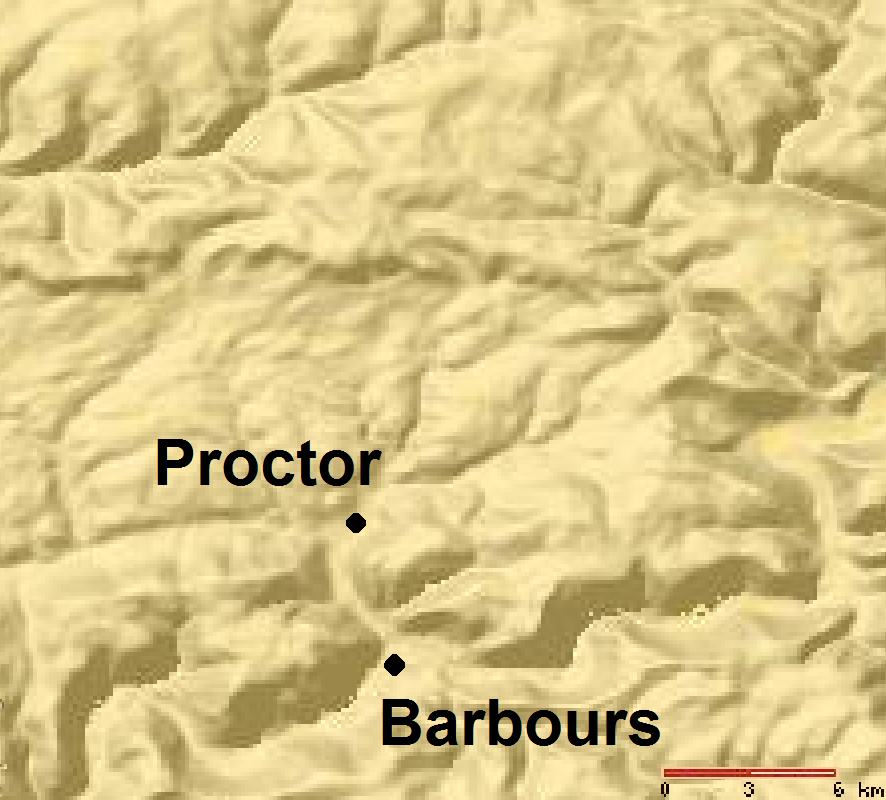
Relief map of the Plunketts Creek watershed in the dissected Allegheny Plateau

Plunketts Creek is in the southern edge of the dissected Allegheny Plateau, near the Allegheny Front. The underlying bedrock is sandstone and shale, mostly from the Mississippian sub-period, with rock from the Devonian period in the north of the watershed. The northern edge of the Plunketts Creek drainage basin is formed by Burnetts Ridge and Popple Ridge. Plunketts Creek flows along the north side of Camp Mountain and, on turning south at Proctor, forms a water gap between it and Cove Mountain (to the west).

The watershed has no oil or conventional natural gas fields. However, a potentially large source of natural gas is the Marcellus shale, which lies 1.5 to 2.0 miles (2.4 to 3.2 km) below the surface here and stretches from New York through Pennsylvania to Ohio and West Virginia. Estimates of the total natural gas in the black shale from the Devonian period range from 168 to 516 trillion cubic feet (4.76 to 14.6 trillion m^{3}), with at least 10 percent considered recoverable.

The Pennsylvania Bureau of Topographic and Geologic Survey's "Distribution of Pennsylvania Coals" map shows no major deposits of coal in the Plunketts Creek watershed, and only one deposit nearby in the Loyalsock Creek watershed (in southern Plunketts Creek Township). However, Meginness (1892) refers to coal mines in Plunketts Creek Township, and there is an unnamed tributary of Plunketts Creek in "Coal Mine Hollow" on the right bank between Dry Run and King Run, so it seems a small coal mine operated there in the past.

Much of the Plunketts Creek valley (and those of its tributaries) is composed of various glacial deposits. Closer to the mouth, there are large deposits of alluvium, as well as alluvial fan and alluvial terraces. Many of the glacial deposits are associated with the Wisconsin glaciation, with stratified drift and till, as well as outwash present. The alluvium is "10 feet (3 m) or more thick in the lower reaches of the Plunketts Creek valley", but only "6 feet (2 m) thick in headward tributary valleys". The outwash is described as "stratified sand and gravel that form terrace remnants along the flanks of Loyalsock Creek and Plunketts Creek valleys".

== Watershed ==
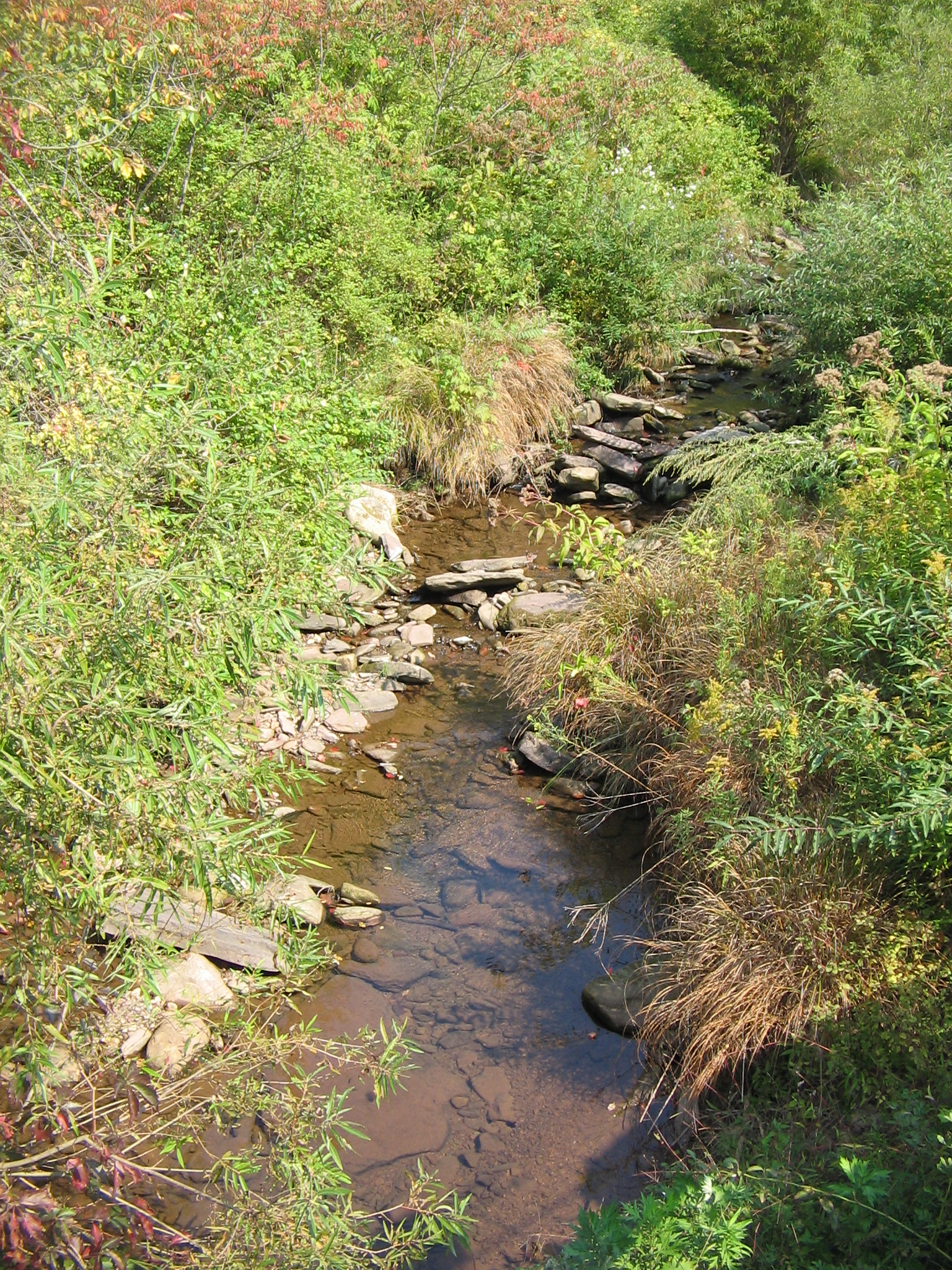
All of Plunketts Creek (here near the source in Hoppestown) is a "high quality cold water fishery".

The Plunketts Creek watershed drains parts of Cascade, McNett, and Plunketts Creek townships in Lycoming County, and Fox and Hillsgrove Townships in Sullivan County (with most of the watershed in Plunketts Creek Township). The drainage basin area is 23.6 square miles (61 km^{2}), accounting for 4.78% of the 494 square miles (1,280 km^{2}) Loyalsock Creek watershed. Bear Creek, whose mouth is also within the village of Barbours but on the opposite (left) bank, is the nearest major creek at 0.52 miles (0.84 km) downstream, as measured along Loyalsock Creek. (It is also known as "Big Bear Creek" as it is the watershed upstream of "Little Bear Creek".) The neighboring major watersheds on the same bank are Wallis Run (9.56 miles (15.39 km) downstream) and Mill Creek (at the village of Hillsgrove, 9.16 miles (14.74 km) upstream). Pleasant Stream, a tributary of Lycoming Creek, is the watershed to the north.

The named tributaries together account for 70.6% of the Plunketts Creek watershed. The largest tributary is Wolf Run, with an area of 7.39 square miles (19.1 km^{2}), accounting for 31.3% of the total. The Wolf Run drainage basin includes both the Noon Branch (4.26 square miles (11.03 km^{2})) and the Brian Branch (1.60 square miles (4.14 km^{2})). The next largest tributary of Plunketts Creek is King Run with 5.56 square miles (14.4 km^{2}) or 23.6% of the watershed. The King Run watershed includes Engle Run, with 2.90 square miles (7.5 km^{2}). The third largest tributary is Dry Run with 1.79 square miles (4.6 km^{2}) or 7.6%, followed by the unnamed tributary in Coal Mine Hollow with 1.08 square miles (2.8 km^{2}) or 4.6%. All other named tributaries are less than 1.00 square mile (2.6 km^{2}) and account for less than 5% of the drainage basin individually. Plunketts Creek does not have its own watershed association, but is part of the larger Loyalsock Creek Watershed Association.

=== Water quality ===
The clear-cutting of forests in the 19th century adversely affected the ecology of the Plunketts Creek watershed and its water quality. Polluting industries on the creek and its tributaries then included a coal mine and tannery (which are long since departed). In the autumn of 1897, three men working with hides at the Proctor tannery were stricken with anthrax, two fatally. Another four deaths originally blamed on pneumonia were suspected of being due to pulmonary anthrax, and some cattle drinking from Plunketts Creek downstream from the tannery were also infected. As late as 1959, the sludge pile from the tannery was still visible in Proctor, but was not disturbed for fear of anthrax spores. No acid mine drainage is reported in the watershed.

As of 1984, the mean annual precipitation for the Loyalsock Creek watershed (which Plunketts Creek is part of) was 42 to 48 inches (1067 to 1219 mm). Pennsylvania receives the greatest amount of acid rain of any state in the United States. Because Plunketts Creek is in a sandstone and shale mountain region, it has a relatively low capacity to neutralize added acid. This makes it especially vulnerable to increased acidification from acid rain, which poses a threat to the long term health of the plants and animals in the creek. The total alkalinity (TA) is a measure of the capacity of water to neutralize acid, with a larger TA corresponding to a greater capacity. In 2007, the TA of two subtributaries was known: Engle Run, a 4.9-mile (7.9 km) tributary of King Run, had a TA of 5, and the Noon Branch, a 1.9-mile (3.1 km) tributary of Wolf Run, had a TA of 9.

The 2002 Pennsylvania Department of Conservation and Natural Resources (DCNR) report on "State Forest Waters with Special Protection" rated Plunketts Creek (from its source to mouth) and two of it tributaries, Wolf Run and Mock Creek (from the county line to the mouth), as "High Quality-Cold Water Fisheries". Two subtributaries were rated as "Exceptional Value" streams for fishing: Engle Run and the Noon Branch of Wolf Run.

=== Recreation ===
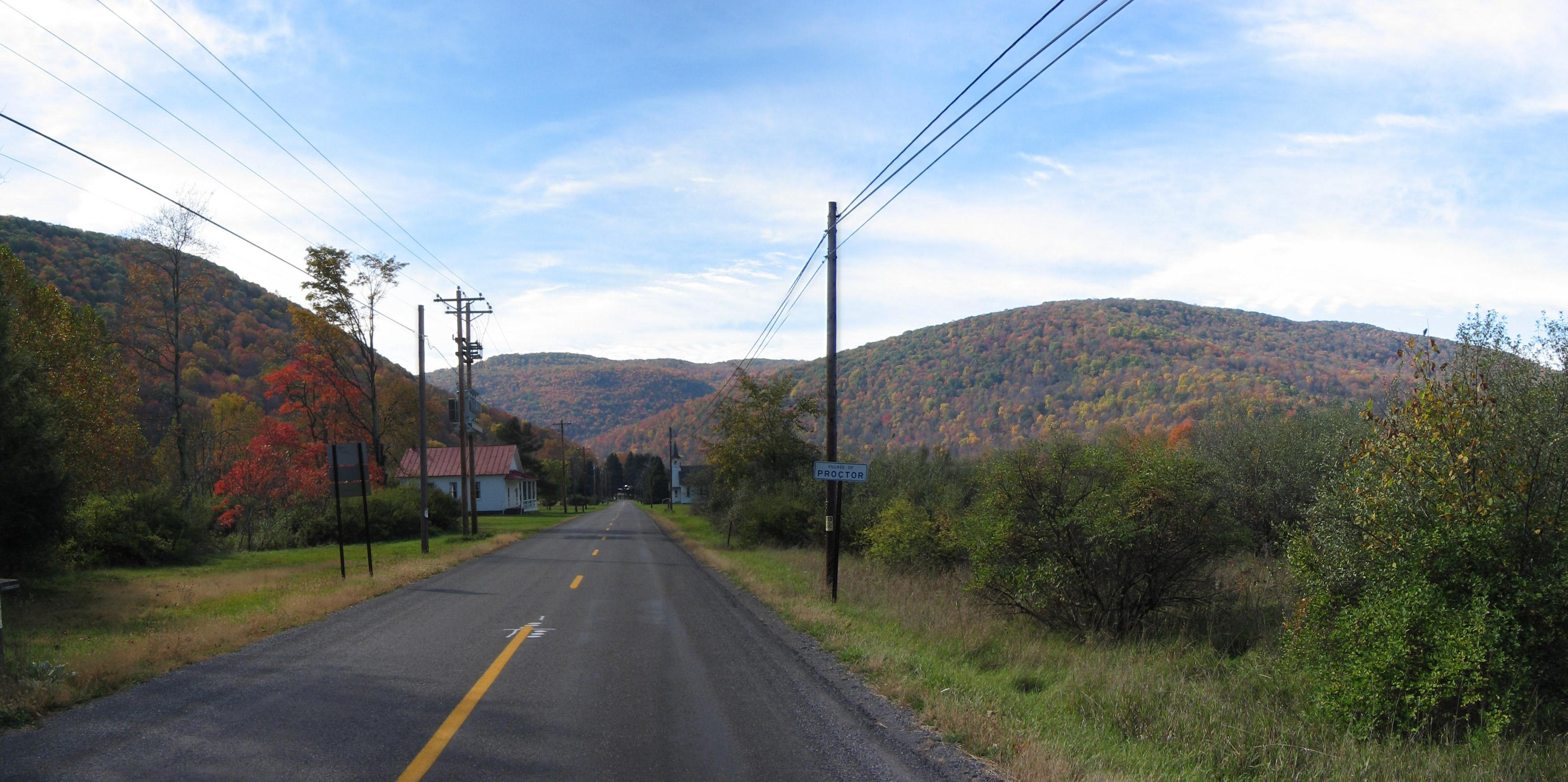
Proctor looking west – the surrounding mountains are popular with hunters and hikers.

Meginness (1892) wrote that "Plunkett's Creek township, on account of its dashing mountain streams of pure water, has always been a favorite place for trout fishing." In 2007, the Pennsylvania Fish and Boat Commission classified both Engle Run and the Noon Branch of Wolf Run as Class A Wild Trout Waters, defined as "streams which support a population of naturally produced trout of sufficient size and abundance to support a long-term and rewarding sport fishery." Barbours has been popular from early on with "anglers seeking trout in the 'Sock and its tributaries", as well as with hunters after black bear, white-tailed deer, and wild turkey in the surrounding forests.

Besides fishing, the Plunketts Creek watershed contains much of the 6,722 acres (27.20 km^{2}) of Pennsylvania State Game Lands No. 134, in both Lycoming and Sullivan counties. Habitat is found there for deer, ruffed grouse, and wild turkey. Hunting, trapping, and fishing are possible with proper licenses on both the state forest and State Game Lands. Camping, hiking, mountain bike and horseback riding, snowmobiling, cross-country skiing, and bird watching are all possible on state forest lands. The southern end of the 27.1 mile (43.6 km) long Old Loggers Path, a loop hiking trail, runs through the watershed just north of Engle and Wolf Runs.

== History ==
=== Early inhabitants ===
The first recorded inhabitants of the Susquehanna River valley were the Iroquoian speaking Susquehannocks. Their name meant "people of the muddy river" in Algonquian. Decimated by diseases and warfare, they had died out, moved away, or been assimilated into other tribes by the early 18th century. The lands of the West Branch Susquehanna River Valley were then chiefly occupied by the Munsee phratry of the Lenape (or Delaware), and were under the nominal control of the Five (later Six) Nations of the Iroquois.

On November 5, 1768, the British acquired the "New Purchase" from the Iroquois in the Treaty of Fort Stanwix, opening what are now Lycoming and Sullivan counties to settlement. Initial settlements were on or near the West Branch Susquehanna River, and, as noted, Plunkett did not receive the land including the creek until 1776, nor was it surveyed until 1783. It is not clear if Plunkett ever lived on his land: he resided in Northumberland at the time of his death. A squatter named Paulhamus was the first recorded inhabitant of what became Plunketts Creek Township, living there "some time between 1770 and 1776". He was reputed to be a deserter from the British Army and left only when he was captured by British soldiers.

=== Lumber and tannery ===
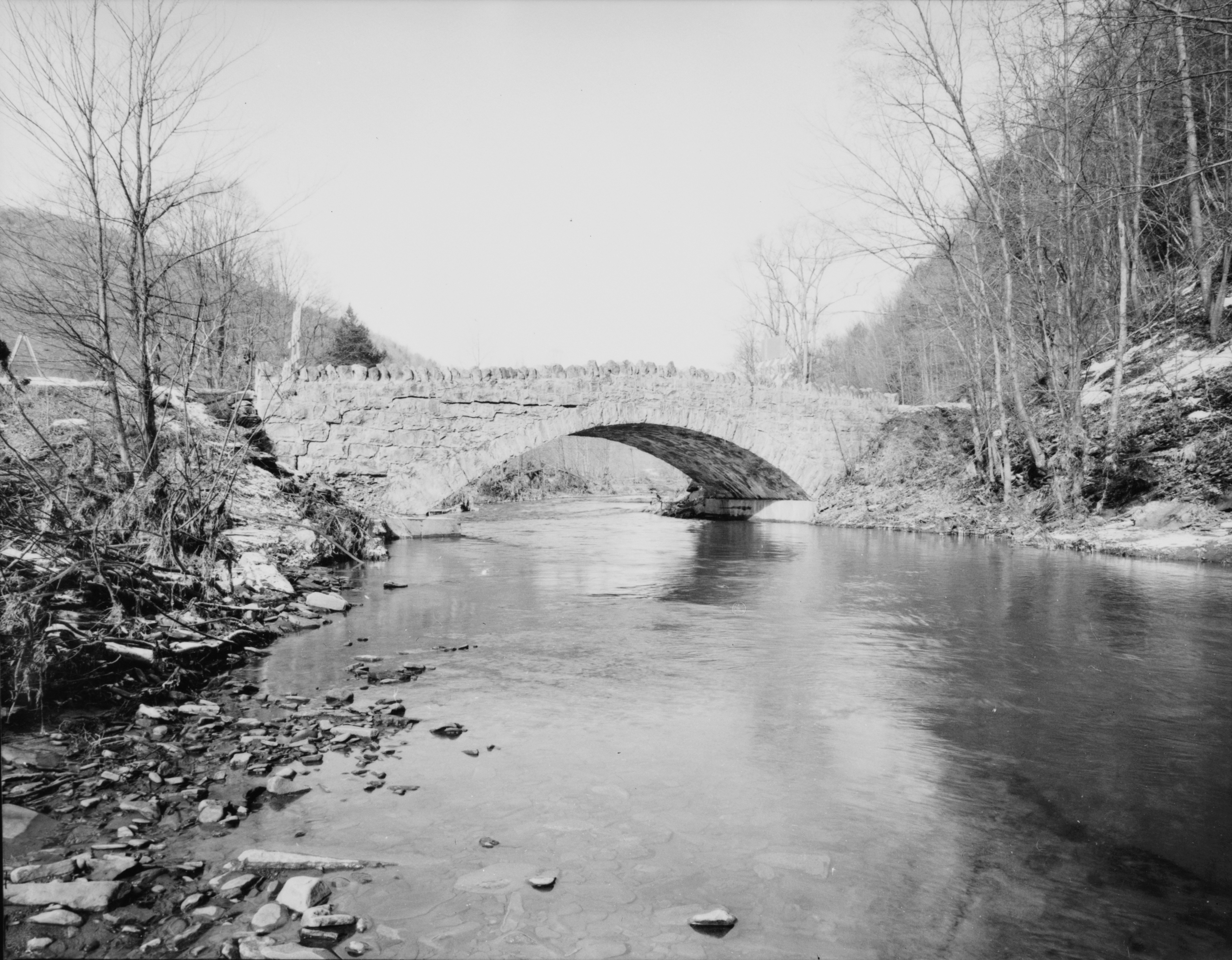
Plunketts Creek Bridge No. 3, built between 1840 and 1875, carried traffic for the tannery in Proctor

Like all streams in Lycoming and Sullivan Counties, Plunketts Creek served as an area for settlers to establish homesteads, mills, and to a lesser extent, farms. Barbours, the first village on the creek, was founded in 1832, when John S. Barbour, a Scottish immigrant, built a sawmill opposite the mouth of Plunketts Creek on Loyalsock Creek. Originally known as "Barbour's Mills", the village is in a rare area of flat land in the narrow Loyalsock valley and contains the mouths of both Plunketts and Bear Creeks. Barbours became a lumber center which owed "its existence to those forested mountains and the creeks that flow out of them". John Scaife arrived in 1856 and became a prosperous lumberman and farmer. His family became prominent in Barbours, and in 1997, his 86-year-old granddaughter, Virdie Scaife Houser Landon, recalled that in her childhood "every family that had 15 cents to their name had a sawmill for cutting lumber." By 1878 the village had several blacksmiths, a temperance hotel, its own post office, many sawmills, a school, and a wagon maker. Barbours flourished throughout the rest of the nineteenth century.

In 1868, Proctor was built as a company town in the midst of the timber required for the tannery (Barbours had initially been considered for the site). The second village on Plunketts Creek was originally named "Proctorville" for Thomas E. Proctor of Boston, who produced leather for the soles of shoes there. Proctor was brought to the area by William Stone of Standing Stone Township in Bradford County, who knew the area was "one vast tract of hemlock timber". The Proctor tannery employed "several hundred" at wages between 50 cents and $1.75 a day, the employees living in one hundred twenty company houses, each renting for $2 a month. Hemlock bark, used in the tanning process, was hauled to the tannery from up to 8 miles (13 km) away in both summer and winter, using wagons and sleds. The hides which were tanned to make leather came from the United States, and as far away as Mexico, Argentina, and China. In 1892, Proctor had a barber shop, two blacksmiths, cigar stand, I.O.O.F hall, leather shop, news stand, a post office (established in 1885), a two-room school, two stores, and a wagon shop. Finished sole leather was hauled by horse-drawn wagon south about 8 miles (13 km) to Little Bear Creek, where it was exchanged for "green" hides and other supplies brought north from Montoursville.

Plunketts Creek was a source of power in the nineteenth century and "water-powered sawmills, woolen mills, and grist (grain) mills lined the 'Sock and Plunketts and Big Bear Creeks". Although hemlock logs were originally left to rot after their bark was peeled for tanning, with time their lumber was used, among other places in a sawmill on Engle Run north of Proctor. By 1892 there were two steam powered sawmills on Plunketts Creek: one 0.5 miles (0.8 km) above the mouth, and the other 4.0 miles (6.4 km) up the creek, near Hoppestown. An extension of the Susquehanna and Eagles Mere Railroad crossed an unnamed tributary of Plunketts Creek near its source in Sullivan County in 1906, running from the village of Hillsgrove northwest to the lumber boomtown of Masten in Cascade and McNett Townships in Lycoming County. A logging railroad was built by the Central Pennsylvania Lumber Company (CPL) in the far northern part of the watershed in the 1920s. It crossed Engle Run twice and ran parallel to Wolf Run, near both their sources. No other railroads crossed or ran along Plunketts Creek.

=== Decline and renewal ===
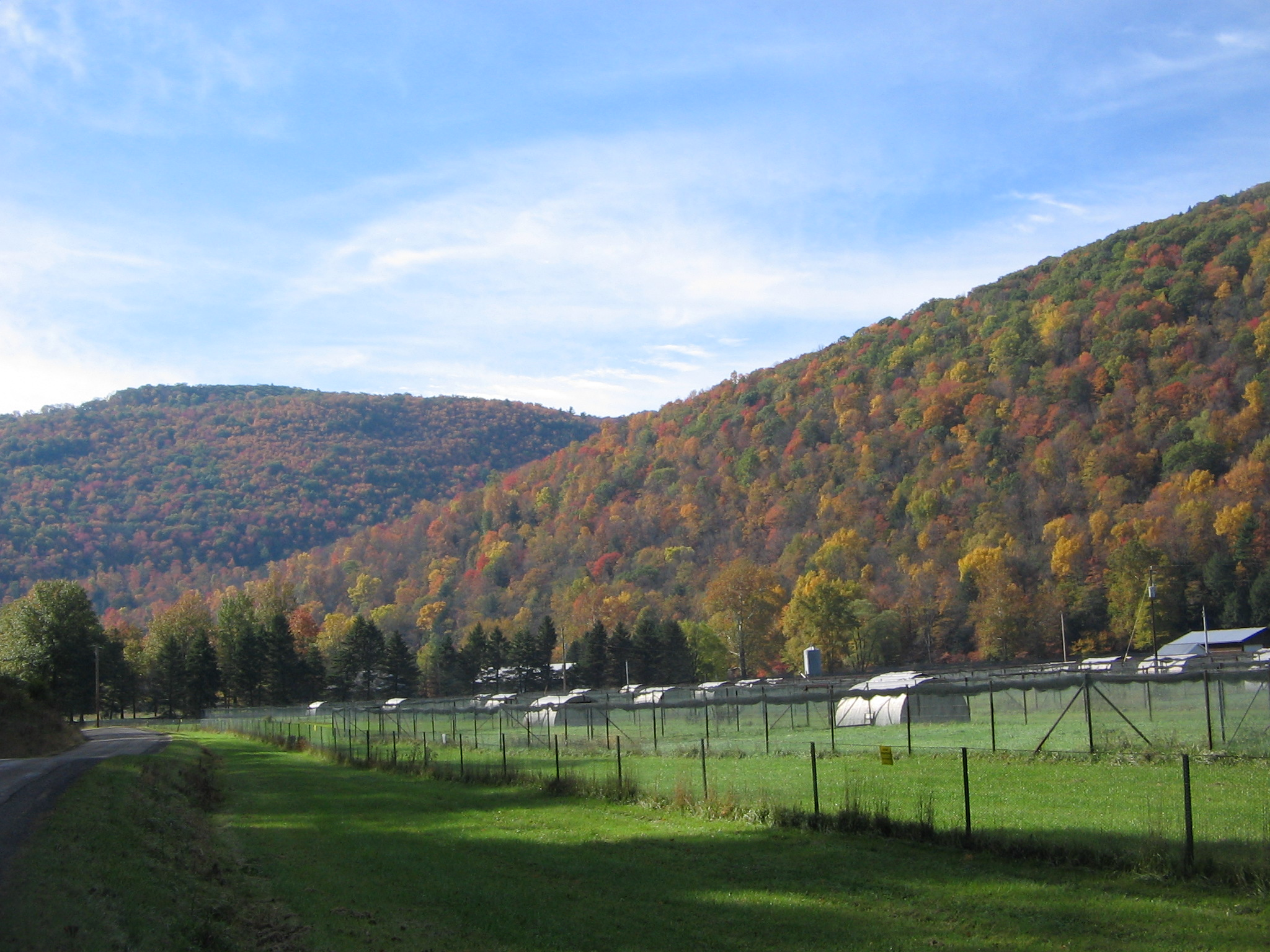
The Plunketts Creek valley looking southwest, with the Northcentral State Game Farm pheasant enclosures. Coal Mine Hollow in Cove Mountain is at left.

The lumber boom on Plunketts Creek ended when the virgin timber ran out. By 1898, the old growth hemlock was exhausted and the Proctor tannery, then owned by the Elk Tanning Company, was closed and dismantled. Lumbering continued in the watershed, but the last logs were floated down Plunketts Creek to the Loyalsock in 1905. The Susquehanna and Eagles Mere Railroad was abandoned in sections between 1922 and 1930, as the lumber it was built to transport was depleted. The CPL logging railroad and their Masten sawmills were abandoned in 1930. Without timber, the populations of Proctor and Barbours declined. The Barbours post office closed in the 1930s and the Proctor post office closed on July 1, 1953. Both villages also lost their schools and almost all of their businesses. Proctor celebrated its centennial in 1968, and a 1970 newspaper article on its thirty-ninth annual "Proctor Homecoming" reunion called it a "near-deserted old tannery town". In the 1980s, the last store in Barbours closed, and the former hotel (which had become a hunting club) was torn down to make way for a new bridge across Loyalsock Creek.

Second growth forests have since covered most of the clear-cut land. The beginnings of today's protected areas were established in the late nineteenth and early twentieth centuries: Pennsylvania's state legislature authorized the acquisition of abandoned clear-cut land in 1897, creating the state forest system. The Game Commission began acquiring property for State Game Lands in 1920, and established the Northcentral State Game Farm on Plunketts Creek in 1945 to raise wild turkey. It was converted to Ringneck pheasant production in 1981, and, as of 2007, it is one of four Pennsylvania state game farms producing about 200,000 pheasants each year for release on land open to public hunting. The Northcentral State Game Farm is in the Plunketts Creek valley just south of Proctor, and a part of it is on the right bank of Loyalsock Creek downstream of the confluence. The Loyalsock State Game Farm is 13 miles (21 km) downstream on Loyalsock Creek, at the village of Loyalsockville. When a May 2007 fire destroyed a brooder house there just days before 18,000 pheasant chicks were due to hatch, the eggs were transferred to the nearby Northcentral State Game Farm without reduction in the production goal.

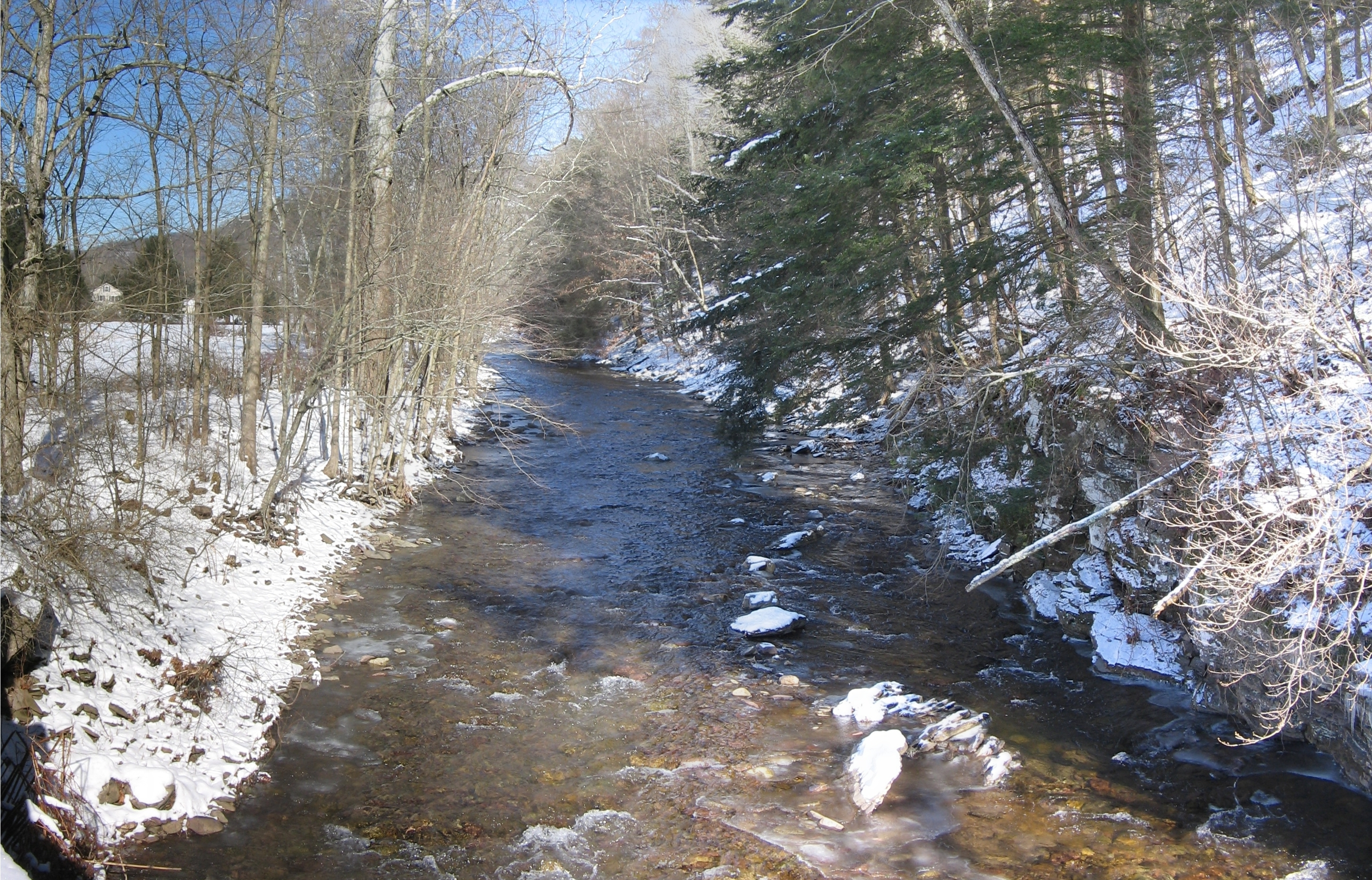
Plunketts Creek cutting through Camp Mountain in the village of Proctor: the creek's ecosystem has recovered since it was a tannery's waste disposal system, from 1868 to 1898.

As of 2007, Proctor has two separate businesses: a general store (which also sells gasoline) and a bed and breakfast. The church which used to host the annual "Proctor Homecoming" reunions still stands, but is closed. Barbours has no store or gas station, but does have one church. Barbours is home to the Plunketts Creek Township Volunteer Fire Company and township municipal building (which houses a small branch library). Since 1967, Barbours has been home to Pneu-Dart, which makes tranquilizer darts and guns for livestock and wildlife capture and control. In 1997, Pneu-Dart had eight employees. Today much of Plunketts Creek's watershed is wooded and protected as part of Loyalsock State Forest or Pennsylvania State Game Lands No. 134. Pennsylvania's state forests and game lands are managed, and small-scale lumbering operations continue in the watershed today. Barbours has one sawmill, in 1997 it had thirty contract loggers and fifteen employees, with $1.2 million in annual gross sales.

Plunketts Creek has been a place for lumber and tourism since its villages were founded. Before the advent of automobiles, the area was quite isolated and the 16 mile (26 km) trip to Montoursville took at least three hours (today it takes less than half an hour). Residents who used to work locally now commute to Williamsport. "Cabin people" have seasonally increased the population for years, but increasing numbers now live there year-round. From 1950 to 2000, the population of Plunketts Creek Township increased 80.6 percent from 427 to 771 (for comparison, in the same period Lycoming County's population increased by only 18.6 percent, while Sullivan County's declined by 2.9 percent). Tourists still come too: the opening weekend of the trout season brings more people into the village at the mouth of Plunketts Creek than any other time of the year.

== See also ==
- List of rivers of Pennsylvania
