= Hoppestown, Pennsylvania =

Unincorporated community in Pennsylvania, US

- Unincorporated community
- Location within Pennsylvania Location within the United States
- Coordinates: 41°26′10″N 76°46′27″W
- Country: United States
- State: Pennsylvania
- County: Lycoming
- Township: Plunketts Creek
- Elevation: 991 ft (302 m)
- Time zone: UTC-5 (Eastern (EST))
  - Summer (DST): UTC-4 (EDT)
- Area codes: 570 and 272
- GNIS feature ID: 1198911

Hoppestown is an unincorporated community in Plunketts Creek Township, Lycoming County, Pennsylvania, United States.
