= Proctor, Pennsylvania =

Unincorporated community in Pennsylvania, US

- Unincorporated community
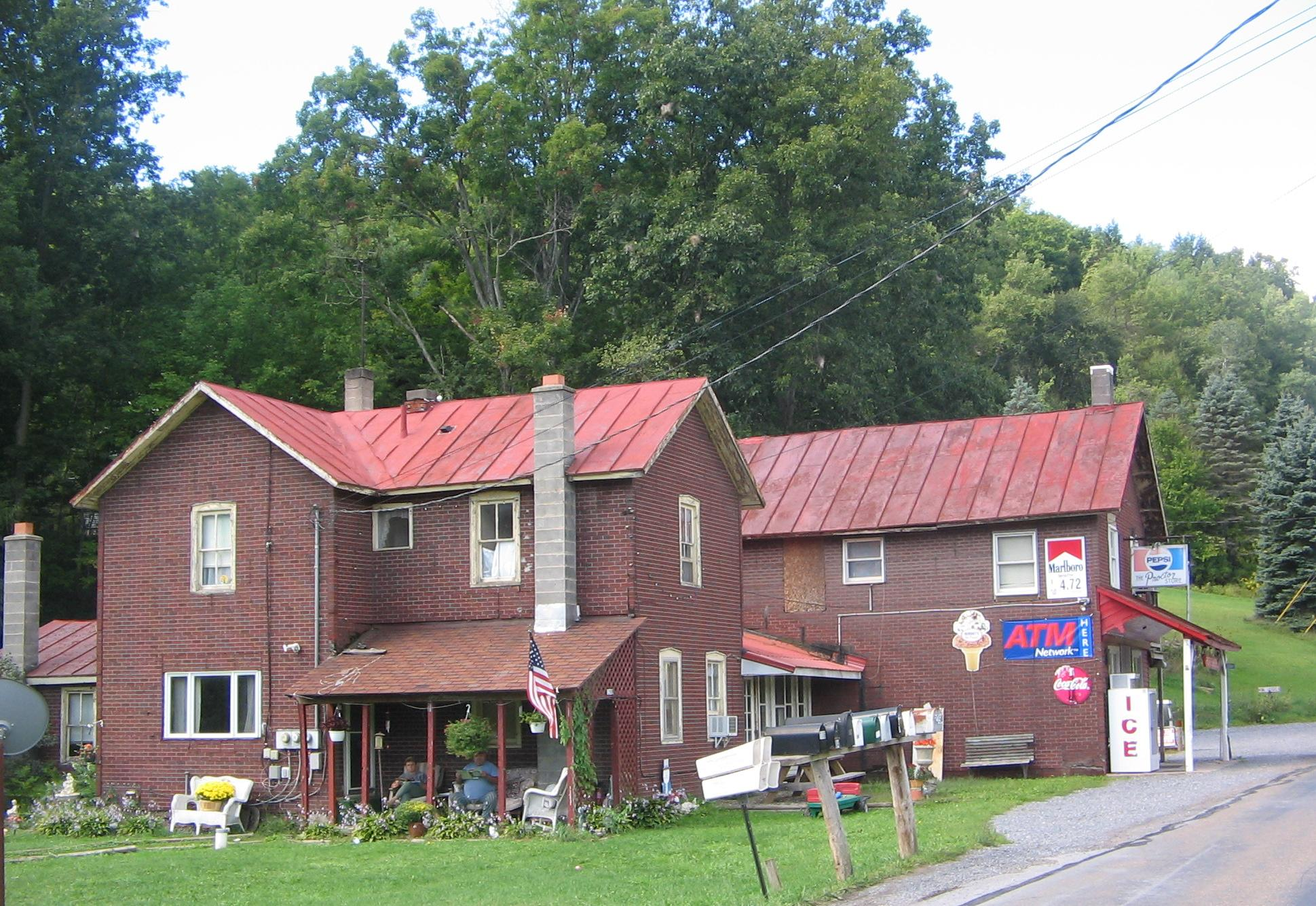
- Proctor's general store

- Location within Pennsylvania Location within the United States
- Coordinates: 41°25′12″N 76°48′27″W
- Country: United States
- State: Pennsylvania
- County: Lycoming
- Township: Plunketts Creek
- Elevation: 804 ft (245 m)
- Time zone: UTC-5 (Eastern (EST))
  - Summer (DST): UTC-4 (EDT)
- Area codes: 570 and 272
- GNIS feature ID: 1204449

Proctor (also Proctorville) is an unincorporated community in Plunketts Creek Township, Lycoming County, Pennsylvania, United States.
