= Plunketts Creek Township, Pennsylvania =

Township in Pennsylvania, US

- Township
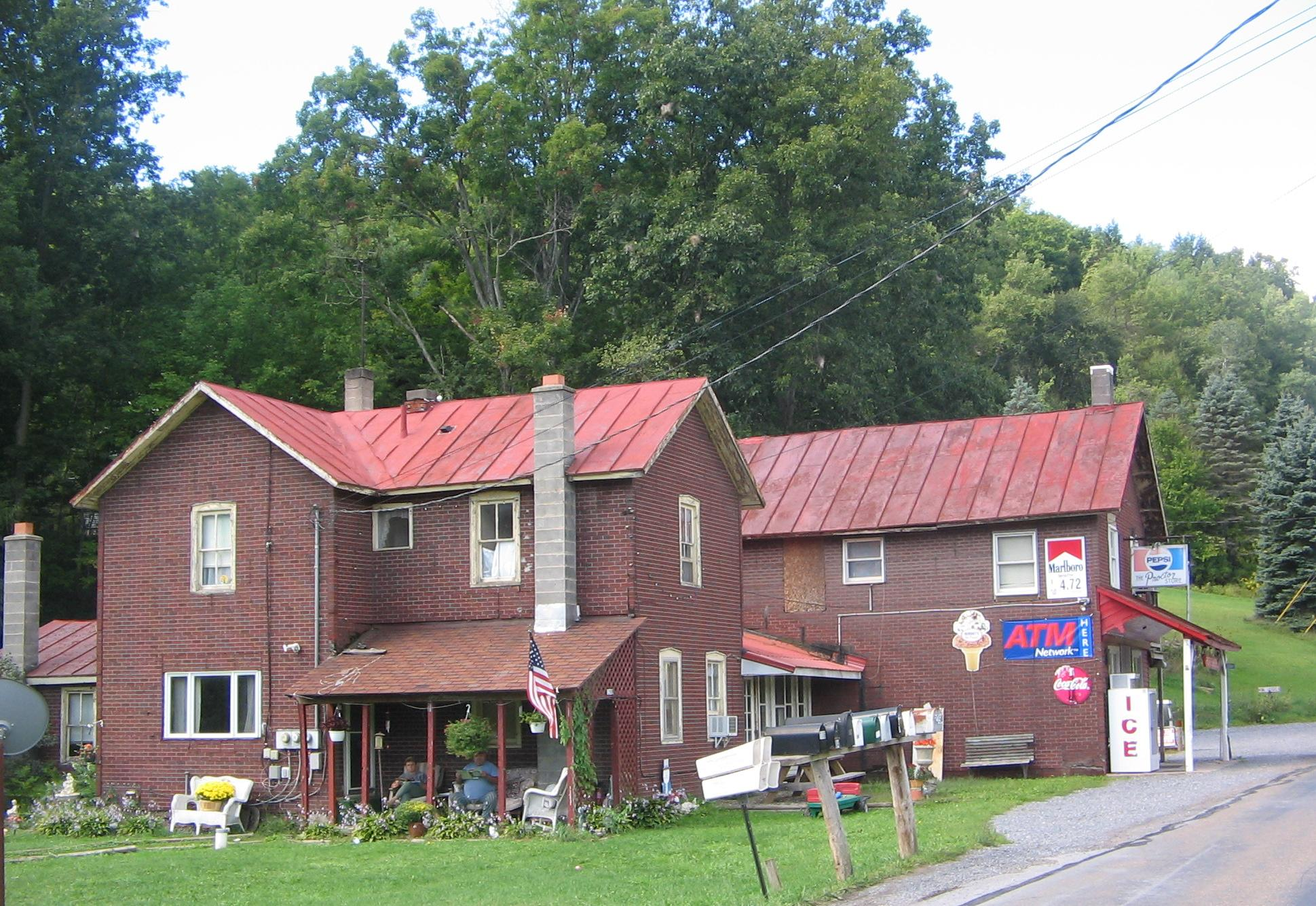
- The general store in Proctor

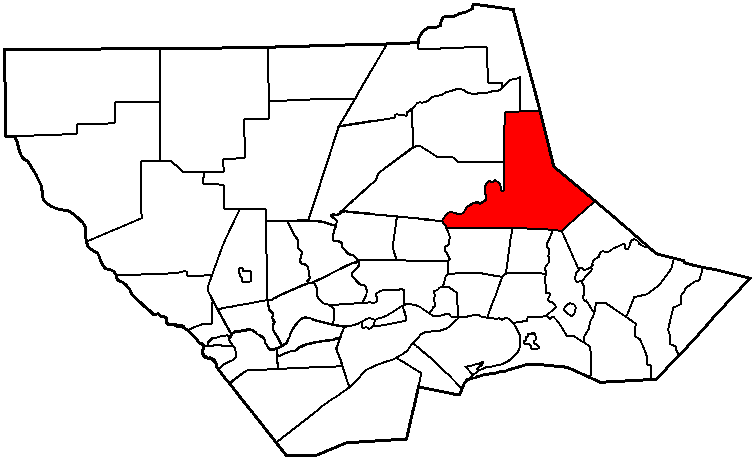
- Map of Lycoming County, Pennsylvania highlighting Plunketts Creek Township

- Map of Lycoming County, Pennsylvania
- Coordinates: 41°24′1″N 76°48′47″W
- Country: United States
- State: Pennsylvania
- County: Lycoming
- Settled: 1770
- Formed: 1836

Area
  - Total: 54.07 sq mi (140.05 km^{2})
  - Land: 53.55 sq mi (138.69 km^{2})
  - Water: 0.53 sq mi (1.36 km^{2})
- Elevation: 1,611 ft (491 m)

Population (2020)
  - Total: 595 ▼
  - Estimate (2021): 591
  - Density: 12.8/sq mi (4.96/km^{2})
- Time zone: UTC-5 (Eastern Time Zone (North America))
  - Summer (DST): UTC-4 (EDT)
- ZIP code: 17701
- Area code: 570
- FIPS code: 42-081-61640
- GNIS feature ID: 1216770
- Website: www.plunkettscreektownship.org

Plunketts Creek Township is a township in Lycoming County, Pennsylvania, United States. It includes the villages of Barbours and Proctor. The population was 595 at the 2020 census, down from 684 at the 2010 census. It is part of the Williamsport Metropolitan Statistical Area.

== History ==
=== Colonial and Revolutionary era ===
Plunketts Creek Township was formed from parts of Franklin Township, Lycoming County, and what is now Davidson Township, Sullivan County, by the Court of Quarter Sessions of the Peace of Lycoming County in 1838. The township was once much larger in size, but several townships in both Lycoming and Sullivan counties have been carved from its original boundaries. The township is named for Plunketts Creek, a tributary of Loyalsock Creek. The creek is in turn named for Colonel William Plunkett, a frontier doctor and militia officer during the pre-Revolution years in the Province of Pennsylvania. He was noted for his skill in dressing the wounds of pioneers who had been scalped during the French and Indian War. Plunkett was also a veteran of the Pennamite–Yankee War, which had pitted settlers from Connecticut to the Wyoming Valley of Pennsylvania against those who had been established in Pennsylvania prior to the Connecticut settlers' arrival. He received title to land at the mouth of the creek that is now named for him.

The township was originally to be called Plunkett Township. Some residents of the township did not approve of this name. They questioned William Plunkett's loyalty, for he had remained largely "passive" regarding the American Revolution. Some believed that he had sympathized with the cause of the Tories during the Revolution, but others wanted to honor one of the first and most important settlers to the area. A compromise was reached by naming it "Plunketts Creek Township".

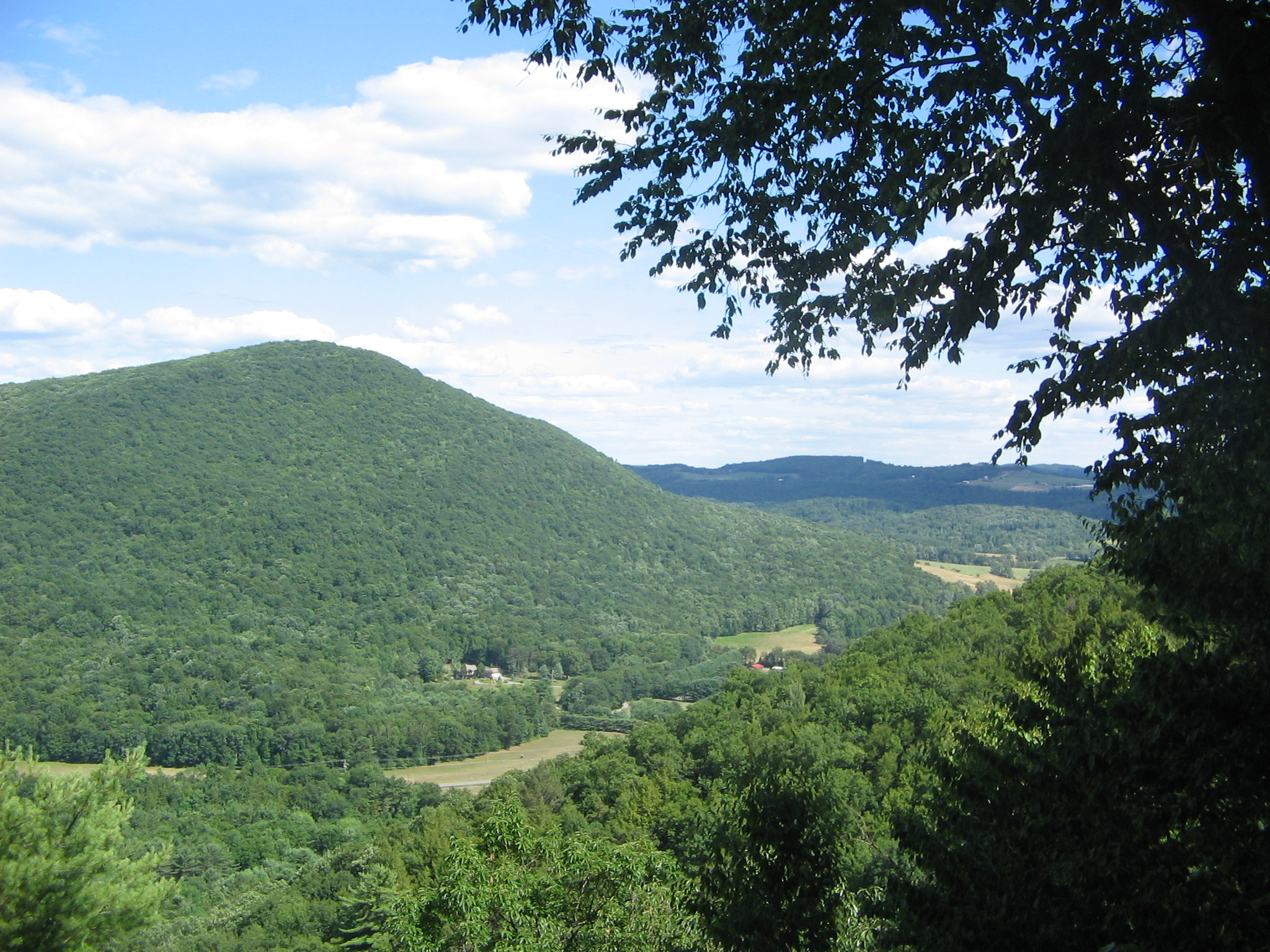
Pluketts Creek Township and the Loyalsock Creek valley (from the Doe Pen Vista in Rider Park).

The first white man to live in Plunketts Creek Township had the surname of Paulhamus. Tradition states that he was a deserter during the Revolutionary War. He fled from the Redcoats and cleared a small piece of land in the wilderness along Loyalsock Creek near the mouth of Bear Creek. Paulhamus was a squatter on the land from 1770 until 1776, when it is thought that he was forced to rejoin the British Army. Permanent settlers did not arrive in Plunketts Creek Township until 1818. Three men, Donelly, Smith and Payne, found the cabin that had been abandoned by Paulhamus. They expanded Paulhamus' improvements and began farming, fishing and hunting in the area.

=== Logging and tanning era ===
Logging was the principal industry in Plunketts Creek Township during the mid-to-late 19th century. Thousands of acres of old-growth forest were harvested and floated down Loyalsock Creek and its tributaries to one of the many sawmills that had sprung up throughout Lycoming County. There were several sawmills in Barbours, a village along Loyalsock Creek in the township.

In 1832, John Barbour built a sawmill on Loyalsock Creek near the mouth of Plunketts Creek, and the village of Barbours Mills (today Barbours) developed at the site. In the 19th century, Barbours had several blacksmiths, a temperance hotel, a post office, many sawmills, a school, store and wagon maker. In 1840, a road was built north from Barbours along Plunketts Creek, crossing it several times. This is the earliest possible date for construction of the bridge, but the surviving county road docket on the construction does not mention either bridges or fords for crossing the creek.

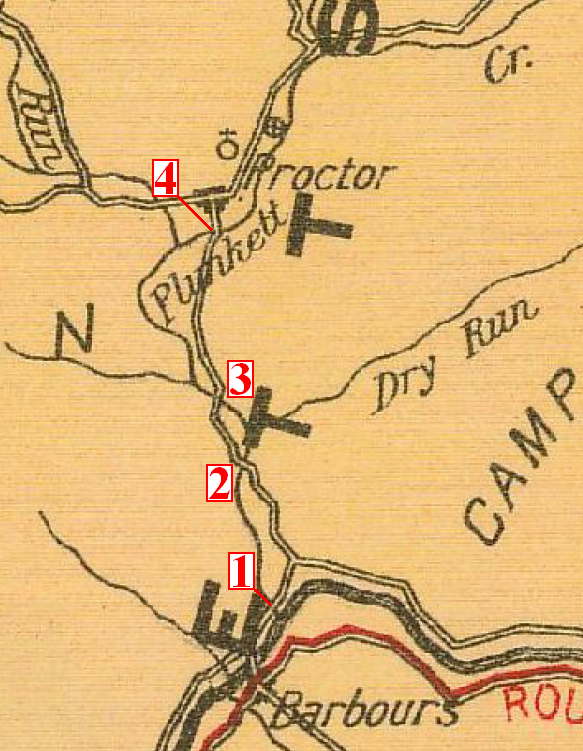
A 1916 map showing Plunketts Creek and the four bridges over it between the villages of Barbours and Proctor

The bridge is at the mouth of Coal Mine Hollow, and the road it was on was used by the lumber and coal industries, which were active in Plunketts Creek Township during the 19th century and early 20th century. Creeks in the township supplied water power to 14 mills in 1861, and in 1876 there were 19 sawmills, a shingle mill, a woolen factory, and a tannery there. These industries supported the inhabitants of two villages in Plunketts Creek Township by the latter half of the 19th century.

In 1868 the village of Proctorville was built as a company town for Thomas E. Proctor's tannery. Proctor, as it is now known, is 1.66 miles (2.67 km) north of Barbours along Plunketts Creek. The bark from Eastern hemlock trees was used in the tanning process, and the village originally sat in the midst of vast forests of hemlock. The tannery employed "several hundred" at wages between 50 cents and US$1.75 a day. These employees lived in 120 company houses, which each rented for $2 a month. In 1892, Proctor had a barbershop, two blacksmiths, cigar stand, I.O.O.F hall, leather shop, news stand, a post office (established in 1885), a two-room school, two stores, and a wagon shop.

Hemlock bark, used in the tanning process, was hauled to the tannery from up to 8 miles (13 km) away in both summer and winter, using wagons and sleds. The hides which were tanned to make leather came from the United States and as far away as Mexico, Argentina, and China. Finished sole leather was hauled by horse-drawn wagon south about 8 miles (13 km) to Little Bear Creek, where it was exchanged for "green" hides and other supplies brought north from Montoursville. The lumber boom on Plunketts Creek ended when the virgin timber ran out. By 1898, the old-growth hemlock was exhausted and the Proctor tannery, then owned by the Elk Tanning Company, was closed and dismantled.

=== 20th century ===
Without timber and the tannery, the populations of Proctor and Barbours declined. The Barbours post office closed in the 1930s, and the Proctor post office closed on July 1, 1953. Both villages also lost their schools and almost all of their businesses. Proctor celebrated its centennial in 1968, and a 1970 newspaper article on its 39th annual "Proctor Homecoming" reunion called it a "near-deserted old tannery town". In the 1980s, the last store in Barbours closed, and the former hotel (which had become a hunting club) was torn down to make way for a new bridge across Loyalsock Creek.

Plunketts Creek Township has been a place for both lumber and tourism since its villages were founded, and as industry declined, nature recovered. Second-growth forests have since covered most of the clear-cut land. Pennsylvania's state legislature authorized the acquisition of abandoned and clear-cut land for Pennsylvania State Game Lands in 1919, and the Pennsylvania Game Commission (PGC) acquired property along Plunketts Creek for State Game Lands Number 134 between 1937 and 1945. The main entrance to State Game Lands 134 is just north of the bridge site, on the east side of the creek.

The PGC established the Northcentral State Game Farm in 1945 on part of State Game Lands 134 to raise wild turkey. The farm was converted to ringneck pheasant production in 1981, and, as of 2007, it was one of four Pennsylvania state game farms producing about 200,000 pheasants each year for release on land open to public hunting. The Northcentral State Game Farm is chiefly in the Plunketts Creek valley, just south of Proctor and north of the bridge. The opening weekend of the trout season brings more people into the village of Barbours at the mouth of Plunketts Creek than any other time of the year.

The Bridge in Plunketts Creek Township was added to the National Register of Historic Places in 1988, but delisted in 2002, after being washed out by a flood in 1996.

== Geography ==
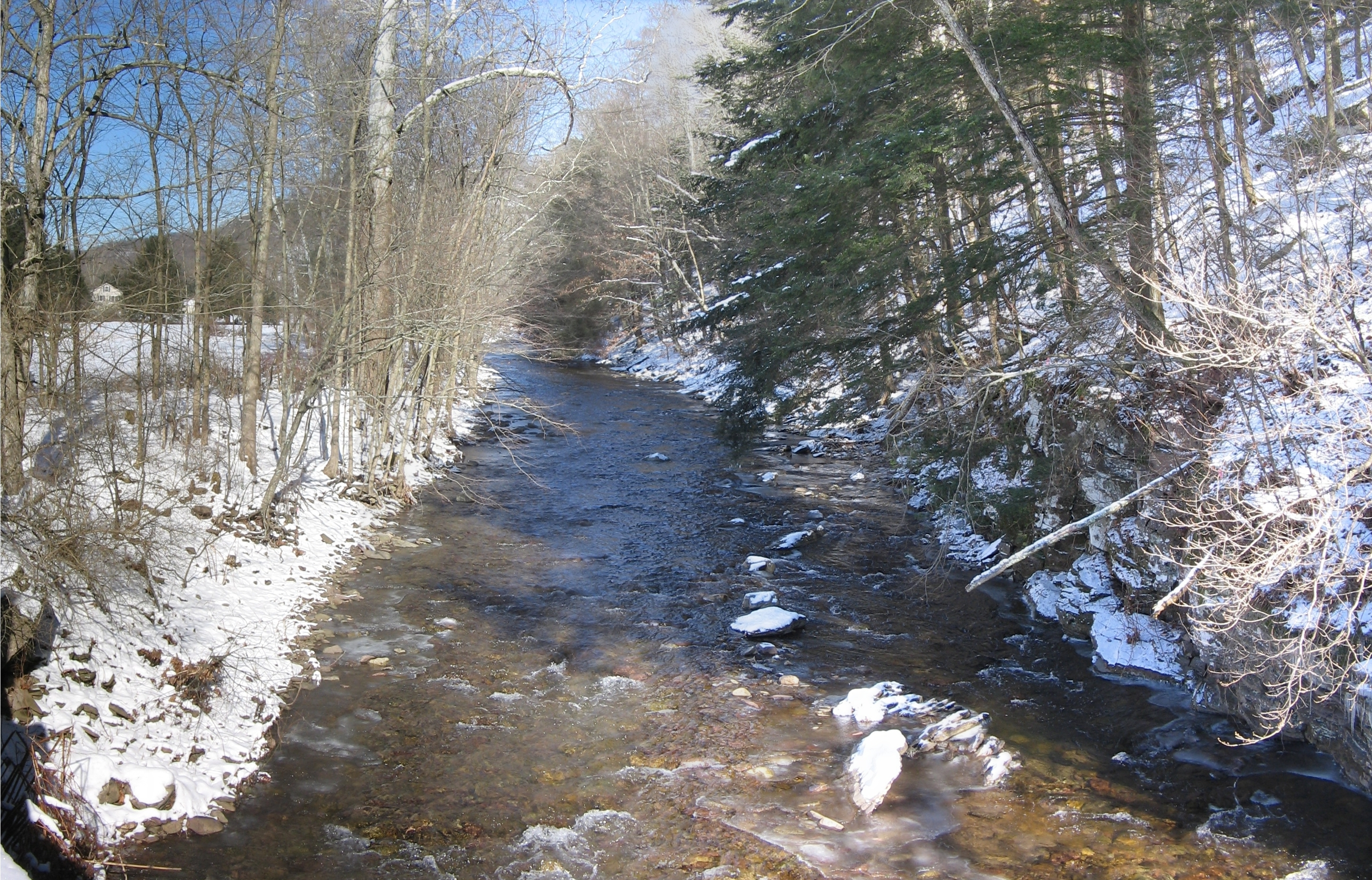
Plunketts Creek cutting through Camp Mountain in the village of Proctor: the creek's ecosystem has recovered since it was a tannery's waste disposal system, from 1868 to 1898.

Plunketts Creek Township is on the eastern edge of Lycoming County. It is bordered by Sullivan County to the northeast, Shrewsbury Township to the southeast, Wolf, Mill Creek and Upper Fairfield townships to the south, Eldred Township to the southwest, Gamble Township to the west, and Cascade Township to the northwest. Pennsylvania Route 87 crosses the center of the township, following Loyalsock Creek and passing through the village of Barbours. PA-87 leads northeastward 15 miles (24 km) to Forksville and southwestward the same distance to Montoursville in the valley of the West Branch Susquehanna River.

According to the United States Census Bureau, the township has a total area of 54.1 square miles (140.1 km^{2}), of which 53.6 square miles (138.7 km^{2}) are land and 0.66 square miles (1.7 km^{2}), or 0.97%, are water. All of the township is in the watershed of Loyalsock Creek except for the southeastern corner, where a small area drains to tributaries of Muncy Creek, like Loyalsock Creek a tributary of the West Branch Susquehanna. Allegheny Ridge, with summit elevations from 1,665 to 2,100 feet (507 to 640 m), runs from west to east just north of the southern border of the township.

== Demographics ==
Historical population
Census	Pop.	Note	%±
2010	684		—
2020	595		−13.0%
2021 (est.)	591		−0.7%
U.S. Decennial Census

As of the census of 2000, there were 771 people, 322 households, and 226 families residing in the township. The population density was 14.0 people per square mile (5.4/km^{2}). There were 501 housing units at an average density of 9.1/sq mi (3.5/km^{2}). The racial makeup of the township was 98.44% White, 0.52% African American, 0.91% Native American, and 0.13% from two or more races. Hispanic or Latino of any race were 0.26% of the population.

There were 322 households, out of which 27.6% had children under the age of 18 living with them, 62.1% were married couples living together, 4.7% had a female householder with no husband present, and 29.8% were non-families. 23.6% of all households were made up of individuals, and 12.4% had someone living alone who was 65 years of age or older. The average household size was 2.39 and the average family size was 2.84.

In the township the population was spread out, with 21.4% under the age of 18, 5.4% from 18 to 24, 29.2% from 25 to 44, 25.4% from 45 to 64, and 18.5% who were 65 years of age or older. The median age was 42 years. For every 100 females, there were 97.2 males. For every 100 females age 18 and over, there were 100.7 males.

The median income for a household in the township was $40,481, and the median income for a family was $43,542. Males had a median income of $31,125 versus $22,014 for females. The per capita income for the township was $20,563. About 4.7% of families and 6.5% of the population were below the poverty line, including 11.6% of those under age 18 and 1.9% of those age 65 or over.
