= Barbours, Pennsylvania =

Unincorporated community in Pennsylvania, US

- Unincorporated community
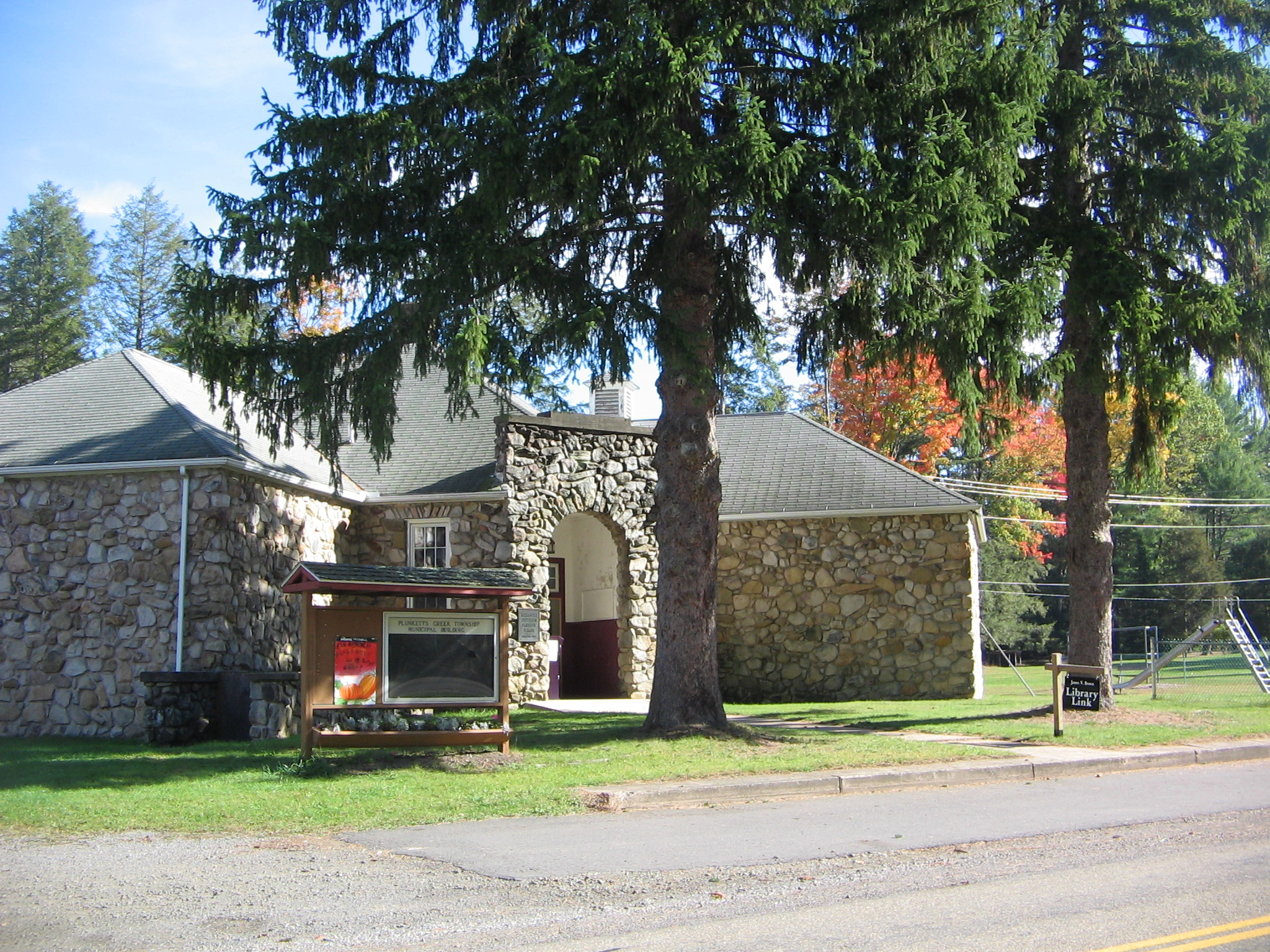
- The Plunketts Creek Township Building in Barbours

- Location within Pennsylvania Location within the United States
- Coordinates: 41°23′35″N 76°47′58″W
- Country: United States
- State: Pennsylvania
- County: Lycoming
- Township: Plunketts Creek
- Elevation: 735 ft (224 m)
- Time zone: UTC-5 (Eastern (EST))
  - Summer (DST): UTC-4 (EDT)
- Area codes: 570 and 272
- GNIS feature ID: 1203019

Barbours (also Barbours Mill) is an unincorporated community in Plunketts Creek Township, Lycoming County, Pennsylvania.
