= Spring Creek (White Deer Hole Creek tributary) =

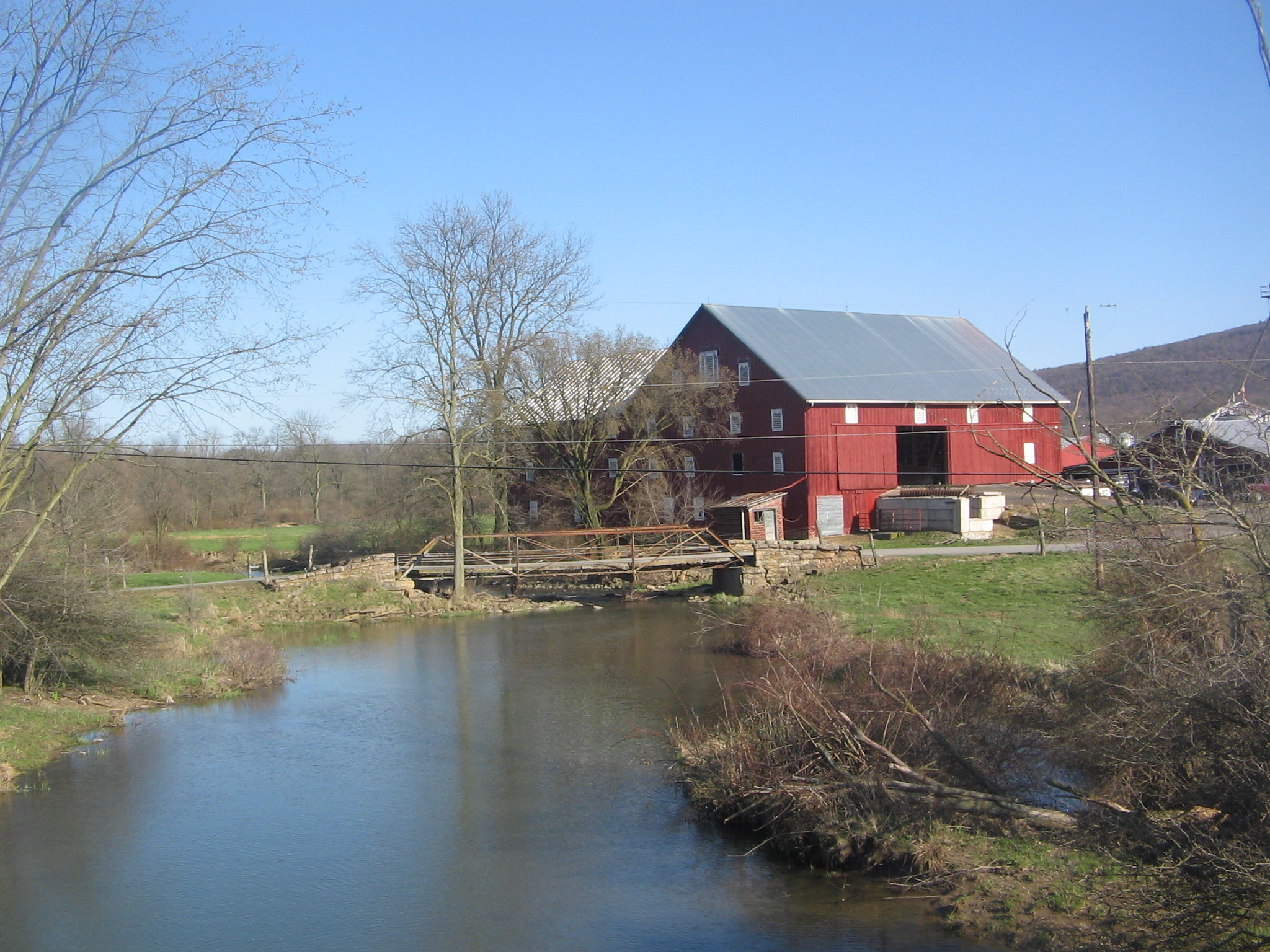
- Spring Creek

Physical characteristics
- Source
  - location: base of North White Deer Ridge in Washington Township, Lycoming County, Pennsylvania
  - elevation: 747 ft (228 m)
- Mouth
  - location: White Deer Hole Creek in Gregg Township, Union County, Pennsylvania near Spring Garden
  - coordinates: 41°06′45″N 76°56′03″W
  - elevation: 466 ft (142 m)
- Length: 8.2 mi (13.2 km)
- Basin size: 21.1 sq mi (55 km^{2})

Basin features
- Progression: White Deer Hole Creek → West Branch Susquehanna River → Susquehanna River → Chesapeake Bay
- Tributaries
  - left: nine unnamed tributaries
  - right: five unnamed tributaries

Spring Creek is a tributary of White Deer Hole Creek in Lycoming County and Union County, in Pennsylvania, in the United States. It is approximately 8.2 miles (13.2 km) long and flows through Washington Township in Lycoming County and Gregg Township in Union County. The watershed of the creek has an area of 21.1 square miles (55 km^{2}). The creek is not designated as an impaired waterbody. The area in its vicinity was settled by 1787 and a mill was constructed on it in 1842. A number of bridges have been constructed over the creek. Its drainage basin is designated as a Trout Stocked Fishery and a Migratory Fishery.

== Course ==
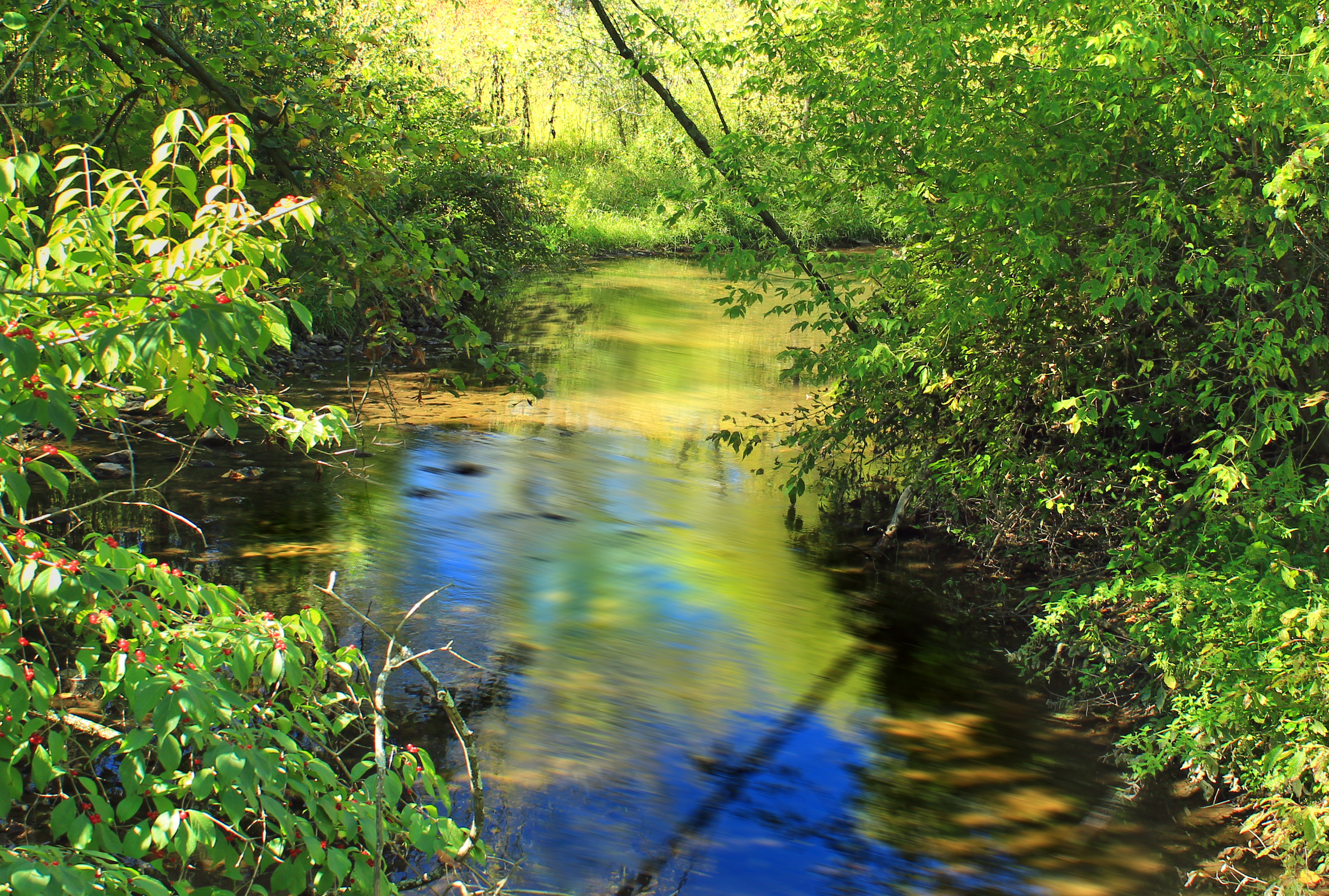
Spring Creek at the Lycoming County/Union County line

Spring Creek begins on the base of North White Deer Ridge in Washington Township, Lycoming County. It flows southeast for several tenths of a mile before turning east-northeast for several tenths of a mile, crossing Pennsylvania Route 554 and receiving two unnamed tributaries from the left. The creek then gradually turns southeast, receiving two more unnamed tributaries from the left and passing through a small pond. It then receives a very short unnamed tributary from the right before turning east-northeast. After a few tenths of a mile, it receives an unnamed tributary from the left and heads in a mostly south-southeasterly direction for a few miles, receiving two unnamed tributaries from the left and two from the right. The creek then turns east for several tenths of a mile, exiting Washington Township and Lycoming County and entering Gregg Township, Union County. Here, the creek meanders east-southeast for a few miles, receiving two unnamed tributaries from the left and two from he right before crossing Pennsylvania Route 44 and reaching its confluence with White Deer Hole Creek.

Spring Creek joins White Deer Hole Creek 3.59 miles (5.78 km) upstream of its mouth.

== Hydrology ==
Spring Creek is not designated as an impaired waterbody. The creek's watershed is a USDA/NRCS priority watershed in Lycoming County.

== Geography and geology ==
The elevation near the mouth of Spring Creek is 466 feet (142 m) above sea level. The elevation of the creek's source is 747 feet (228 m) above sea level.

== Watershed ==
The watershed of Spring Creek has an area of 21.1 square miles (55 km^{2}). The mouth of the stream is in the United States Geological Survey quadrangle of Allenwood. However, its source is in the quadrangle of Williamsport. The stream also passes through the quadrangle of Montoursville South. Its mouth is located within 1 mile (1.6 km) of Spring Garden.

== History ==
Spring Creek was entered into the Geographic Names Information System on August 2, 1979. Its identifier in the Geographic Names Information System is 1188221.

Historically, an Indian path followed Spring Creek from its mouth to its source and then over Bald Eagle Mountain, to Lycoming Creek, and beyond. In 1787, two of the fourteen families of White settlers in the White Deer Hole Valley were located on Spring Creek. Jesse Weeks inhabited a cabin on the northern side of the creek, approximately 4 miles (6.4 km) upstream of its mouth. An Englishman named Daniel Sunderland occupied a cabin 1 mile (1.6 km) upstream from Weeks.

Isaac Hains built the fifth mill in Washington Township, Lycoming County on Spring Creek. The Spring Creek church was established on Mill Road near Spring Creek on January 7, 1877.

A concrete tee beam bridge carrying T-528 over Spring Creek was built in Gregg Township, Union County in 1919 and is 44.0 feet (13.4 m) long. A prestessed box beam or girders bridge carrying Pennsylvania Route 44 over the creek was built in 2007 0.5 miles (0.80 km) west of Spring Garden and is 94.2 feet (28.7 m) long. A two-span concrete stringer/multi-beam or girder bridge carrying State Route 2003 over the creek was built in 1915 2 miles (3.2 km) northeast of Elimsport and is 42.0 feet (12.8 m) long. A prestresed box beam or girders bridge carrying State Route 2001 across Spring Creek was constructed in 1959 and repaired in 2011. This bridge is 26.9 feet (8.2 m) long and is also 2 miles (3.2 km) northeast of Elimsport.

== Biology ==
The drainage basin of Spring Creek is designated as a Trout Stocked Fishery and a Migratory Fishery. The creek has been described as providing "excellent" opportunities for angling.

== See also ==
- Beartrap Hollow, next tributary of White Deer Hole Creek going upstream
- List of rivers of Pennsylvania
