= Black Run (West Branch Susquehanna River tributary) =

- Location of Black Run mouth Black Run (West Branch Susquehanna River tributary) (the United States)

Physical characteristics
- Source
  - location: east of a pond in Brady Township, Lycoming County, Pennsylvania
  - elevation: 629 ft (192 m)
- Mouth
  - location: West Branch Susquehanna River in Brady Township, Lycoming County, Pennsylvania near Montgomery
  - coordinates: 41°08′24″N 76°53′44″W
  - elevation: 456 ft (139 m)
- Length: 5.87 mi (9.45 km)
- Basin size: 5.87 mi^{2} (15.2 km^{2})

Basin features
- Progression: West Branch Susquehanna River → Susquehanna River → Chesapeake Bay
- Tributaries
  - left: three unnamed tributaries
  - right: one unnamed tributary

Black Run is a tributary of the West Branch Susquehanna River in Lycoming County and Union County, in Pennsylvania, in the United States. It is approximately 3.6 miles (5.8 km) long and flows through Brady Township in Lycoming County and Gregg Township in Union County. The watershed of the stream has an area of 5.87 square miles (15.2 km^{2}). The stream is not designated as an impaired waterbody. It is a relatively small stream with its mouth located near Montgomery. The stream's watershed is designated as a Warmwater Fishery and a Migratory Fishery.

== Course ==
Black Run begins to the east of a pond in Brady Township, Lycoming County. It flows south-southeast for several tenths of a mile before exiting Brady Township and Lycoming County. Upon leaving Lycoming County, the stream enters Gregg Township, Union County and turns southeast for several tenths of a mile, passing through a pond, receiving an unnamed tributary from the left, and passing through a wetland. It then passes through another pond, where it receives an unnamed tributary from the right. The stream then turns east for several tenths of a mile before turning east-southeast for several tenths of a mile. In this reach, it receives an unnamed tributary from the left. The stream then turns northeast, crossing US Route 15, before turning east and receiving an unnamed tributary from the left. After a few tenths of a mile, it turns northeast for a few tenths of a mile, reentering Brady Township, Lycoming county. The stream then turns east-southeast for a few tenths of a mile before reaching its confluence with the West Branch Susquehanna River.

Black Run joins the West Branch Susquehanna River 20.34 miles (32.73 km) upstream of its mouth.

== Hydrology ==
Black Run is not designated as an impaired waterbody. The Lycoming County RMS Recycling Facility and the Lycoming County RMS Southside Stockpile once applied for a permit to discharge stormwater into an unnamed tributary or tributaries of the stream. The Federal Correctional Complex, Allenwood has discharged effluent from its wastewater treatment plant into the stream.

== Geography and geology ==
The elevation near the mouth of Black Run is 456 feet (139 m) above sea level. The elevation of the stream's source is 629 feet (192 m) above sea level.

Black Run was described as a "rather small and insignificant stream" in an 1899 report.

Glacial drift and boulders of the Catskill Formation and the Pocono Formation occur in the vicinity of Black Run.

== Watershed ==
The watershed of Black Run has an area of 5.87 square miles (15.2 km^{2}). The stream is entirely within the United States Geological Survey quadrangle of Montoursville South. Its mouth is located near Montgomery. The stream is situated near the northern border of Gregg Township, Union County.

The Allenwood Federal Prison Camp and the Lycoming County Landfill are in the watershed of Black Run. In 1990, it was noted that there was a potential industrial site to the north of the stream.

== History ==
Black Run was entered into the Geographic Names Information System on August 2, 1979. Its identifier in the Geographic Names Information System is 1169731.

In the late 1800s, a tannery discharged waste into Black Run. In 1990, a wastewater treatment plant was proposed; it was planned to be located near the mouth of Black Run and to discharge 760,000 US gallons (2,900 m^{3}) per day into the West Branch Susquehanna River.

== Biology ==
The drainage basin of Black Run is designated as a Warmwater Fishery and a Migratory Fishery.

== See also ==
- White Deer Hole Creek, next tributary of the West Branch Susquehanna River going downriver
- Black Hole Creek, next tributary of the West Branch Susquehanna River going upriver
- List of rivers of Pennsylvania
