= Federal Correctional Institution, Allenwood Medium =

Medium-security prison in Pennsylvania, US

Coordinates: 41°9′49″N 76°55′23″W

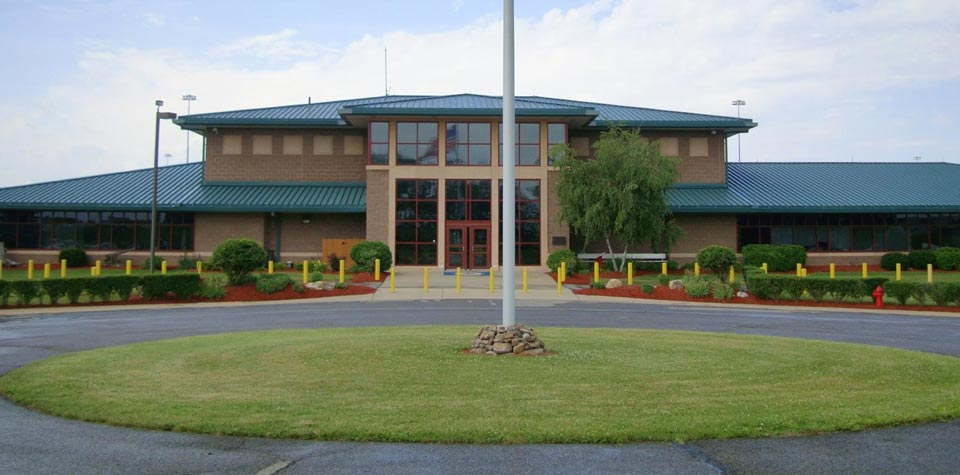
- Interactive map of Federal Correctional Institution, Allenwood Medium
- Location: Gregg Township, Union County, near Allenwood, Pennsylvania
- Status: Operational
- Security class: Medium-security
- Population: 1,400
- Opened: 1992
- Managed by: Federal Bureau of Prisons
- Website: www.bop.gov/locations/institutions/alm/

The Federal Correctional Institution, Allenwood Medium (FCI Allenwood Medium) is a medium-security United States federal prison for male inmates in Gregg Township, Union County, Pennsylvania. It is part of the Allenwood Federal Correctional Complex (FCC Allenwood) and is operated by the Federal Bureau of Prisons, a division of the United States Department of Justice.

FCC Allenwood is located approximately 75 miles north of Harrisburg, Pennsylvania, the state capital.

== Notable inmates (current and former) ==
Inmate Name	Register Number	Photo	Status	Details
Ronald Pelton	22914-037		Released from custody in 2015; served 30 years	Former NSA employee; convicted in 1985 of espionage for turning over classified defense material to the Soviet Union from 1980 to 1985, including information regarding the highly classified Operation Ivy Bells.
Daniel Patrick Boyd	51765-056		Served an 18 year sentence; Released in 2024	Convicted for his participation in a jihadist terrorist cell in North Carolina.
Christopher Tappin	90763-280		Transferred to HMP Wandsworth in September 2013.	Convicted in selling weapon parts to people in Iran.
Farooque Ahmed	77315-083		Serving a 23-year sentence; scheduled for release in 2030.	Convicted of plotting to bomb Washington Metro stations.
James Cromitie	70658-054		Serving a 25-year sentence; scheduled for release in 2030.	Convicted in 2010 of attempted use of weapons of mass destruction and attempted murder for masterminding a plot to bomb synagogues and shoot down planes at Stewart International Airport in New York; three co-conspirators are also in prison.
Kifano Jordan	86333-054		Transferred to USP Allenwood Serving a 15-year sentence; scheduled for release in 2031	Better known as Shotti. Former manager of American rapper 6ix9ine. Pleaded guilty to firearms charges.
Mohammed Jabbateh	75217-066		Serving a 30-year sentence; scheduled for release in 2040	Former Liberian warlord known as Jungle Jabbah; convicted of immigration fraud and perjury for lying about being a war criminal in the First Liberian Civil War

== See also ==
- Federal Correctional Institution, Allenwood Low
- List of U.S. federal prisons
- Federal Bureau of Prisons
- Incarceration in the United States
