= Federal Correctional Institution, Allenwood Low =

Low-security prison in Pennsylvania, US

Coordinates: 41°9′49″N 76°55′23″W

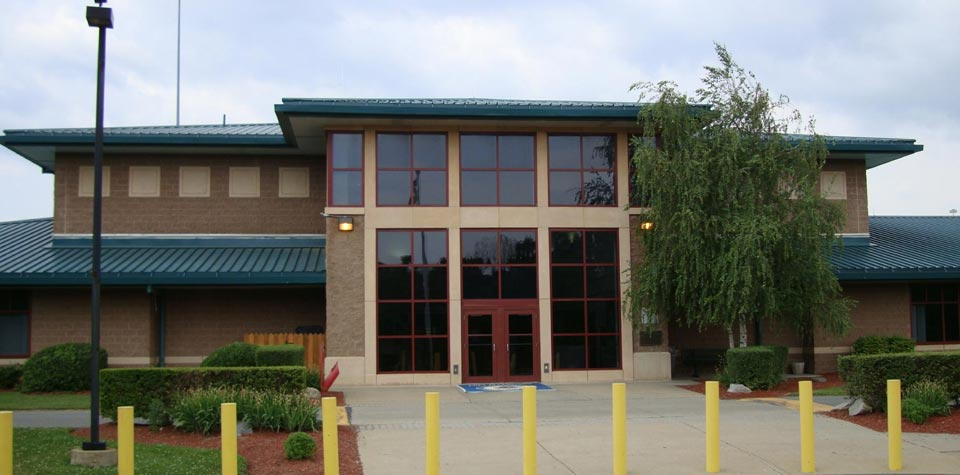
- Interactive map of Federal Correctional Institution, Allenwood Low
- Location: Gregg Township, Union County, Pennsylvania
- Status: Operational
- Security class: Low-security
- Population: 1,450
- Opened: 1992
- Managed by: Federal Bureau of Prisons
- Website: www.bop.gov/locations/institutions/alf/

The Federal Correctional Institution, Allenwood Low (FCI Allenwood Low) is a low-security United States federal prison for male inmates in Gregg Township, Union County, Pennsylvania. It is part of the Allenwood Federal Correctional Complex (FCC Allenwood) and is operated by the Federal Bureau of Prisons, a division of the United States Department of Justice.

FCC Allenwood is located 75 miles north of Harrisburg, Pennsylvania, the state capital, just west of US Route 15.

== Notable incidents ==
In February 2013, Fred Hagenbuch, 52, a former correction officer at the United States Penitentiary, Lewisburg, a high-security prison also located in Pennsylvania, pleaded guilty to a charge of theft of government property for stealing items from FCC Allenwood. The stolen property included electrical conduit, fence post, and mesh fencing valued at approximately $1,545.

== Notable inmates (current and former) ==
| Inmate Name | Register Number | Photo | Status | Details |
|---|---|---|---|---|
| Sean Combs | 37452-054 | | Serving a 50 month sentence; scheduled for release on March 2, 2028. | Former rapper, record producer, and music executive also known as "Diddy". Convicted of two counts of transportation to engage in prostitution. |
| Jeb Stuart Magruder | | | Released in January 1975 after serving seven months | A White House staffer and Nixon election campaign executive, Magruder was sentenced to ten months to four years for his role in the Watergate Scandal. |
| Ng Lap Seng | 92441-054 | | Served a 4 year sentence; released in 2021 | Chinese businessman convicted in 2017 for bribery. |
| John P. McGonigle | 20050-038 | | Released in 1999 | A former Middlesex County Sheriff, McGonigle was convicted of tax evasion and pleaded guilty to conspiracy to commit racketeering for demanding kickbacks from two of his deputies. |
| Kifah Jayyousi | 39551-039 | | Released in 2017; served 12 years. | Co-defendant of Jose Padilla; convicted in 2007 of murder conspiracy and providing material support for terrorism for sending money, equipment, and recruits to support jihad overseas. |
| Alex van der Zwaan | 35255-016 | | Released June 4, 2018, after serving 30 days, then deported to England. | Making false statements in relation to the Special Counsel investigation on foreign interference in the 2016 US elections. |
| Nicholas Corozzo | 19241-053 | | Released November 29, 2019 after serving 11 years. | High-ranking member of the Gambino crime family and top lieutenant of John Gotti. In 2009, Corozzo was sentenced to 13½ years for corruption charges and involvement in two 1996 murders. |
| Kevin Seefried | 25549-509 | | Seefried was pardoned on January 20, 2025, the first day of the second presidency of Donald Trump | Participant in the January 6 United States Capitol attack |
| Martin Shkreli | 87850-053 | | Released May 18, 2022 after serving four years, two months | Nicknamed the "pharma bro." Convicted of securities fraud. Was originally at Fort Dix, until it was discovered he was still running his company via a contraband cellphone, which led to his transfer to Allenwood. |
| Tal Prihar | 12911-509 | | Serving an eight year sentence, scheduled for release in 2026 | Israeli man pleaded guilty of conspiracy for money laundering. |
| Virgil Griffith | 79038-112 | | Released April 9, 2025 after serving 46 months at both Allenwood and FCI Milan | Convicted of conspiracy to violate the International Emergency Economic Powers Act, after speaking at a cryptocurrency conference in Pyongyang, North Korea. |
| Ippei Mizuhara | 09459-511 | | Sentenced to 57 months, scheduled for release April 17, 2029. | Former interpreter for MLB's Shohei Ohtani. Pleaded guilty to bank fraud and tax evasion for impersonating his former boss in order to obtain millions of dollars to cover illegal gambling debts. |
| Bob Menendez | 67277-050 | | Serving an 11-year sentence. | Former United States Senator; convicted in 2024 of various bribery and corruption charges. Was originally from FCI Schuylkill before being transferred to the prison as of July 2025. |
| Eric C. Conn | 20834-032 | | Serving a 27 year-sentence, release date in November 29, 2039 | Convicted of conducting the largest Social Security fraud scheme in US history costing the government around $550 million. |

== See also ==
- Federal Correctional Institution, Allenwood Medium
- List of U.S. federal prisons
- Federal Bureau of Prisons
- Incarceration in the United States
