= Beartrap Hollow =

Beartrap Hollow Bear Trap Hollow
- Location of Beartrap Hollow mouth Beartrap Hollow (the United States)

Physical characteristics
- Source
  - location: South White Deer Ridge in Washington Township, Lycoming County, Pennsylvania
  - elevation: 1,536 ft (468 m)
- Mouth
  - location: White Deer Hole Creek in Washington Township, Lycoming County, Pennsylvania near Elmsport
  - coordinates: 41°07′09″N 77°01′50″W
  - elevation: 553 ft (169 m)
- Length: 1.5 mi (2.4 km)
- Basin size: 0.42 mi^{2} (1.1 km^{2})

Basin features
- Progression: White Deer Hole Creek → West Branch Susquehanna River → Susquehanna River → Chesapeake Bay
- Tributaries
  - left: one unnamed tributary

Beartrap Hollow (also known as Bear Trap Hollow) is a tributary of White Deer Hole Creek in Lycoming County, Pennsylvania, in the United States. It is approximately 1.5 miles (2.4 km) long and flows through Washington Township. The watershed of the stream has an area of 0.42 square miles (1.1 km^{2}). The stream is not designated as an impaired waterbody. Much of the stream's length is on South White Deer Ridge and it is near Tiadaghton State Forest.

== Course ==
Beartrap Hollow begins on South White Deer Ridge in Washington Township. It flows north down the ridge for several tenths of a mile before turning north-northwest. After several tenths of a mile, the stream reaches the bottom of the ridge and receives an unnamed tributary from the left. It then turns northeast for a short distance before reaching its confluence with White Deer Hole Creek.

Beartrap Hollow joins White Deer Hole Creek 10.84 miles (17.45 km) upstream of its mouth.

=== Tributaries ===
Beartrap Hollow has no named tributaries. However, it does have one unnamed tributary. This tributary is approximately 0.6 miles (0.97 km) long and starts lower on South White Deer Ridge than the main stem. It joins Beartrap Hollow in its lower reaches.

== Hydrology, geography, and geology ==
The elevation near the mouth of Beartrap Hollow is 553 feet (169 m) above sea level. The elevation near the stream's source is 1,536 feet (468 m) above sea level.

The headwaters of Beartrap Hollow are on a ridge known as South White Deer Ridge. The ridge is relatively steep in the stream's upper reaches, but becomes less steep towards the lower reaches of the stream. It flows down into the broad valley of White Deer Hole Creek.

Beartrap Hollow is in the Ridge and Valley Freestone region.

Beartrap Hollow is not designated as an impaired waterbody.

== Watershed and biology ==
The watershed of Beartrap Hollow has an area of 0.42 square miles (1.1 km^{2}). The stream is entirely within the United States Geological Survey quadrangle of Williamsport SE. Its mouth is located near Elmsport.

Beartrap Hollow is being considered by the Pennsylvania Fish and Boat Commission for wild trout designation.

== History and recreation ==
The valley of Beartrap Hollow was entered into the Geographic Names Information System on August 2, 1979. Its identifier in the Geographic Names Information System is 1168978. The stream does not have a name of its own, but instead takes its name from the valley through which it flows. It is also known as Bear Trap Hollow.

Beartrap Hollow was surveyed by the Pennsylvania Fish and Boat Commission on June 14, 2013. It was listed on the Pennsylvania Fish and Boat Commission website as being considered for wild trout designation on January 20, 2015.

Beartrap Hollow is located near Tiadaghton State Forest.

== See also ==
- Spring Creek (White Deer Hole Creek), next tributary of White Deer Hole Creek going downstream
- List of rivers of Pennsylvania
