= Benjamin Griffey House =

Historic house in Pennsylvania, United States

- U.S. National Register of Historic Places
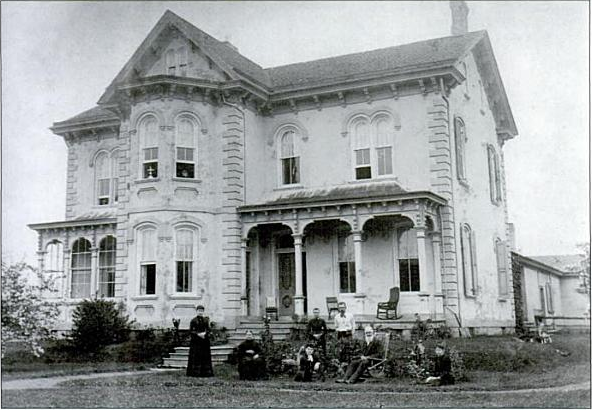
- The house circa 1910

- Location within Pennsylvania Location within the United States
- Location: West of Allenwood on Pennsylvania Route 44, Gregg Township, Pennsylvania
- Coordinates: 41°7′18″N 76°57′56″W
- Area: 0.2 acres (0.081 ha)
- Built: c. 1886
- Built by: Griffey, Benjamin
- Architectural style: Late Victorian
- NRHP reference No.: 78002474
- Added to NRHP: September 13, 1978

Benjamin Griffey House is a historic home located at Gregg Township, Union County, Pennsylvania. It was built about 1886, and is a 2 1/2-story, rectangular stuccoed brick dwelling with a rear ell, in a Late Victorian style. It features a two-story bay window with flanking porches and a steep pitched gable.

It was listed on the National Register of Historic Places in 1978. The house was badly damaged in a fire in 1980. As of December 2012, the house is still in the original location.
