= Pennsylvania Route 554 =

State highway in Pennsylvania, US

Pennsylvania Route 554

Route information
- Maintained by PennDOT
- Length: 8.76 mi (14.10 km)
- Existed: 1928–present

Major junctions
- South end: PA 44 in Washington Township
- North end: US 15 in South Williamsport

Location
- Country: United States
- State: Pennsylvania
- Counties: Lycoming

Highway system
- Pennsylvania State Route System; Interstate; US; State; Scenic; Legislative
← PA 553	→ PA 555

Pennsylvania Route 554 (PA 554) is a highway which runs for 8 miles (14 km) generally north–south in Lycoming County in north central Pennsylvania in the United States. Its southern terminus is at PA 44 just north of the unincorporated village of Elimsport in Washington Township and its northern terminus is at U.S. Route 15 (US 15) in South Williamsport.

== Route description ==
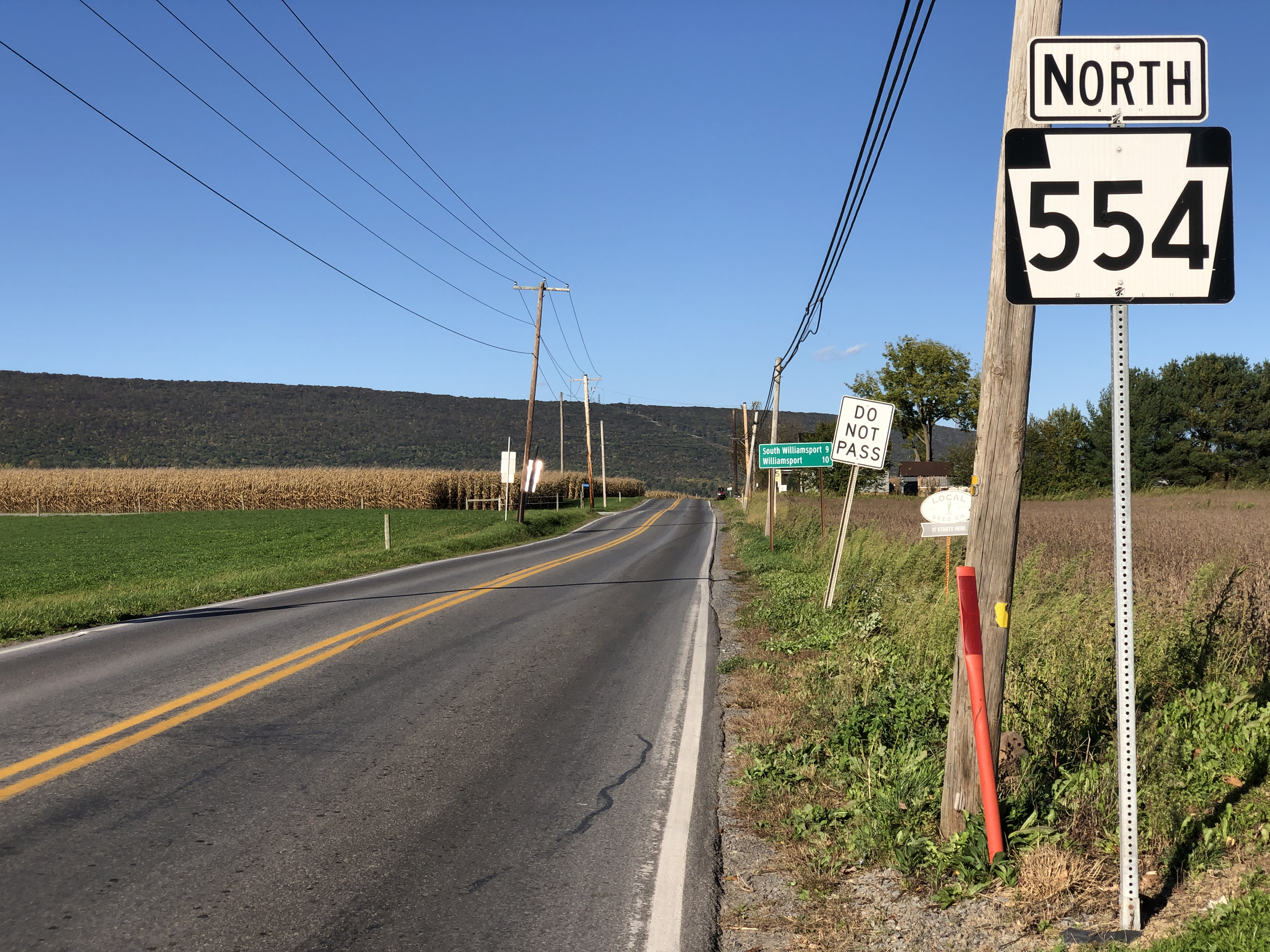
PA 554 from PA 44 in Washington Township

Starting at its southern end in Washington Township, PA 554 runs generally north to North White Deer Ridge, which it climbs in a series of curves and two hairpin turns. It crosses into Armstrong Township at the summit and into the valley between North White Deer Ridge and Bald Eagle Mountain, where it passes the Hagermans Run Reservoir. It then follows Hagermans Run down the north side of Bald Eagle Mountain into the borough of South Williamsport, where it ends at US 15. It does not intersect any other highways.

The route is through farmland north to the mountain, and then is through forests, with much of the land on the mountain in the Tiadaghton State Forest. The Hagermans Run Reservoir is part of the Williamsport Water Authority and much of the route along Hagermans Run is also protected watershed land. There is one limestone quarry in operation in Armstrong Township along the highway.

== History ==
PA 554 was commissioned in 1928. By 1941, the northern endpoint was redesignated from US 15 and US 220 in Williamsport to its current alignment.

== Major intersections ==
The entire route is in Lycoming County.

Location	mi	km	Destinations	Notes
Washington Township	0.00	0.00	PA 44 – Allenwood, Jersey Shore	Southern terminus
South Williamsport	8.76	14.10	US 15 (Montgomery Pike / Hastings Street) – Allenwood, Lewisburg, Williamsport	Northern terminus
1.000 mi = 1.609 km; 1.000 km = 0.621 mi
