= Washington Township, Lycoming County, Pennsylvania =

Township in Pennsylvania, US

- Township
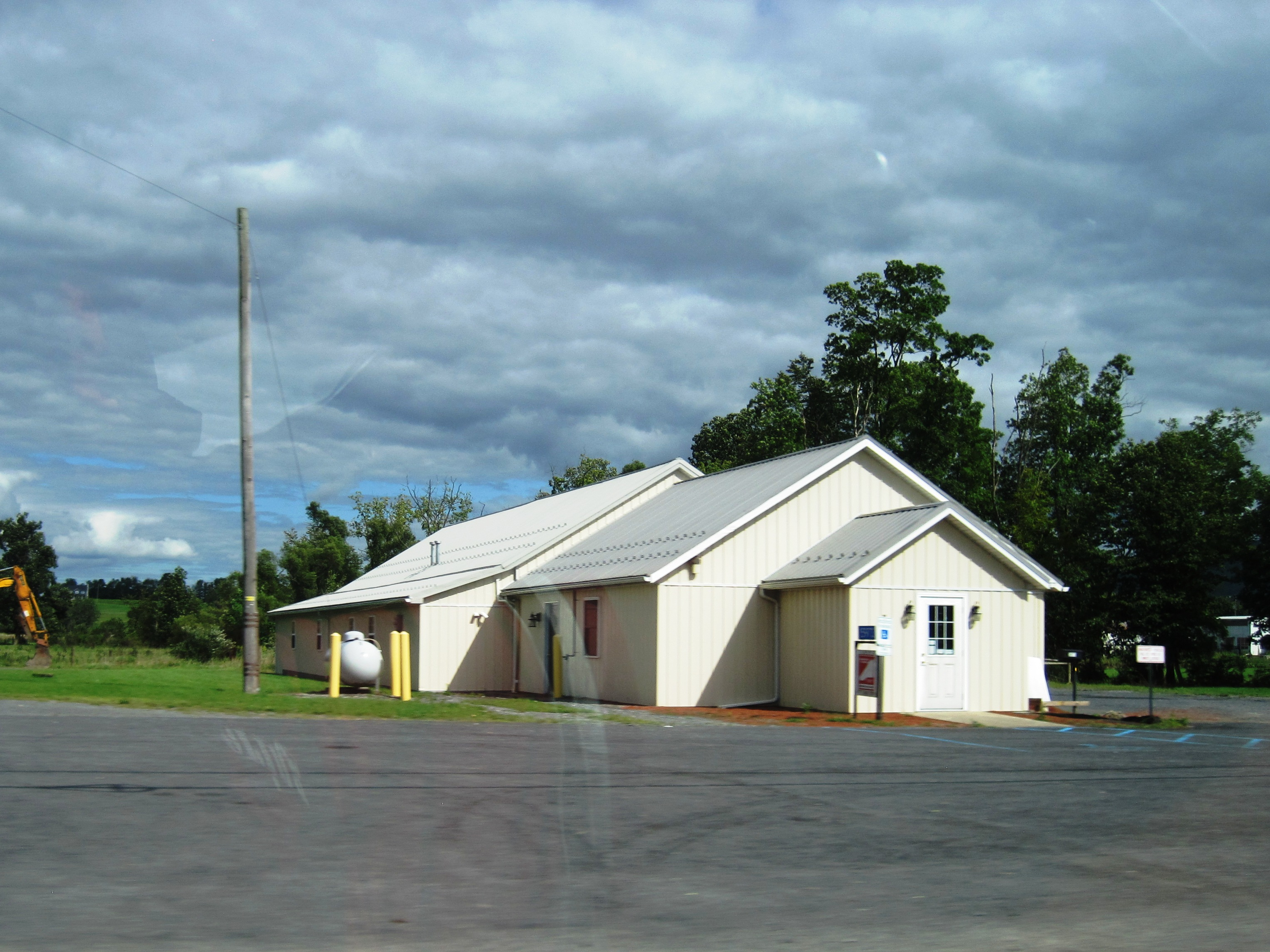
- Town hall

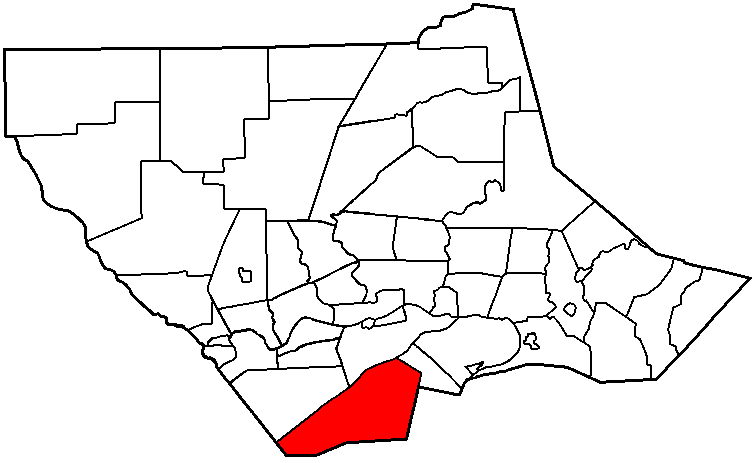
- Location of Washington Township in Lycoming County, Pennsylvania

- Map of Lycoming County, Pennsylvania
- Coordinates: 41°7′21″N 77°2′37″W
- Country: United States
- State: Pennsylvania
- County: Lycoming
- Settled: 1760
- Formed: 1786

Area
  - Total: 48.32 sq mi (125.16 km^{2})
  - Land: 48.22 sq mi (124.89 km^{2})
  - Water: 0.11 sq mi (0.28 km^{2})
- Elevation: 1,447 ft (441 m)

Population (2020)
  - Total: 1,769 ▲
  - Estimate (2021): 1,761
  - Density: 34.4/sq mi (13.28/km^{2})
- Time zone: UTC-5 (Eastern Time Zone (North America))
  - Summer (DST): UTC-4 (EDT)
- FIPS code: 42-081-81288
- GNIS feature ID: 1216775
- Website: washingtontwplyc.com

Washington Township is a township in Lycoming County, Pennsylvania, United States. The population was 1,769 at the 2020 census. It is part of the Williamsport Metropolitan Statistical Area.

== History ==
Washington Township was formed as part of Northumberland County in 1786. It originally extended from White Deer Hole Creek north to the West Branch Susquehanna River, with its eastern boundary also formed by the West Branch. The western limit was ambiguous, but most historians assumed that the western boundary followed a line that extended to the south opposite the mouth of Pine Creek in what is now eastern Clinton County. Washington Township is older than Lycoming County. Therefore, it was one of the original townships in Lycoming County. Seven additional townships were created from land that was originally part of Washington Township. They are Armstrong, Bastress, Brady, Clinton, Limestone, Nippenose, and Susquehanna townships. The township is named for the hero of the American Revolution and the first President of the United States, George Washington.

Historically, two trails of the native indigenous peoples ran along parts of White Deer Hole Creek in Washington Township. Settlers arrived by 1760, but fled in 1778 during the American Revolutionary War during the Big Runaway. They returned, and the creek served as the southern boundary of Lycoming County and Washington Township when it was formed in 1795. A logging railroad ran along the creek from 1901 to 1904 for timber clearcutting, and small-scale lumbering continues.

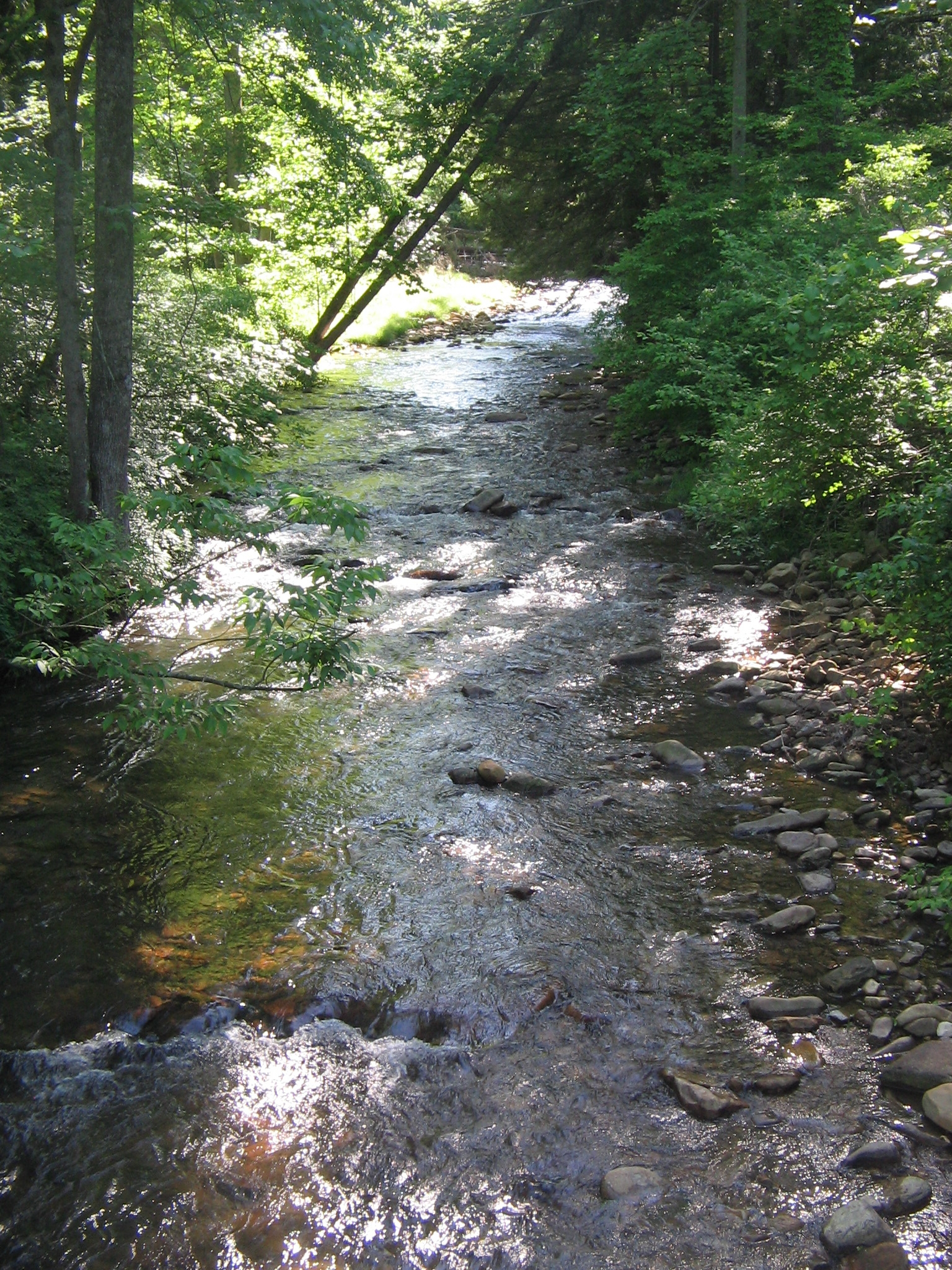
White Deer Hole Creek near First Gap in South White Deer Ridge in Washington Township

The Great Island Path was a major trail that ran north along the Susquehanna River from the Saponi village of Shamokin at modern Sunbury, fording the West Branch of the Susquehanna there and following the west bank of the river north until the White Deer Hole valley. The path turned west at Allenwood and followed White Deer Hole Creek until about the present location of Elimsport in Washington Township. There it headed northwest, crossed North White Deer Ridge and passed west through the Nippenose Valley, then turned north and crossed Bald Eagle Mountain via McElhattan Creek and ran along the south bank of the West Branch to the Great Island (near the present day city of Lock Haven).

In the Revolutionary War, settlements throughout the Susquehanna valley were attacked by Loyalists and Native Americans allied with the British. After the Wyoming Valley battle and massacre in the summer of 1778 (near what is now Wilkes-Barre) and smaller local attacks, the Big Runaway occurred throughout the West Branch Susquehanna valley. Settlers fled feared and actual attacks by the British and their allies. Settlers abandoned their homes and fields, drove their livestock south, and towed their possessions on rafts on the river to Sunbury. Their abandoned property was burnt by the attackers. Some settlers soon returned, only to flee again in the summer of 1779 in the "Little Runaway".

Beginning with the first settlers, much of the land along White Deer Hole Creek in Washington Township was slowly cleared of timber. Small sawmills were built in the 19th century, and a much larger lumber operation was run by the Vincent Lumber Company from 1901 to 1904. They built a 3 ft (914 mm) narrow-gauge railroad from Elimsport 5 miles (8 km) west into timber, and a line east to Allenwood in Union County and the Reading Railroad there. The lumber railroad ran parallel to the creek, with the end of the track near Fourth Gap. It was incorporated on June 24, 1901 (around the time of construction) as the "Allenwood and Western Railroad". The lumbering operation ceased in 1904 when the forests were gone. The railroad was torn up, and its one second-hand Shay locomotive was moved to the Vincent Lumber Company operation at Denholm in Juniata County.

From 1900 to 1935, much of what is now Tiadaghton State Forest was purchased by Pennsylvania from lumber companies that had no further use for the clear-cut land. In the 1930s there were seven Civilian Conservation Corps camps to construct roads and trails in the forest.

On May 31, 1985, around 10:30 pm, a tornado tore through the eastern part of the township, went through the State Gamelands (Old Alvira), and continued into Union County with no warning. Twelve people were injured and one was killed.

Small-scale lumbering continues in the Washington Township, but the forest is certified as well-managed "in an environmentally sensitive manner", and lumber from it qualifies for a "green label". An Amish-owned and operated sawmill is on Pennsylvania Route 44 in Elimsport. It burned down on May 10, 2006 (causing $500,000 in damages) but was expected to be back in operation in a month. Despite this small-scale lumbering, as of 2006 the forests have grown back and are mixed oak, with blueberry and mountain laurel bushes. White Deer Hole Creek and its tributaries also have stands of hemlock and thickets of rhododendron along them.

== Geography ==
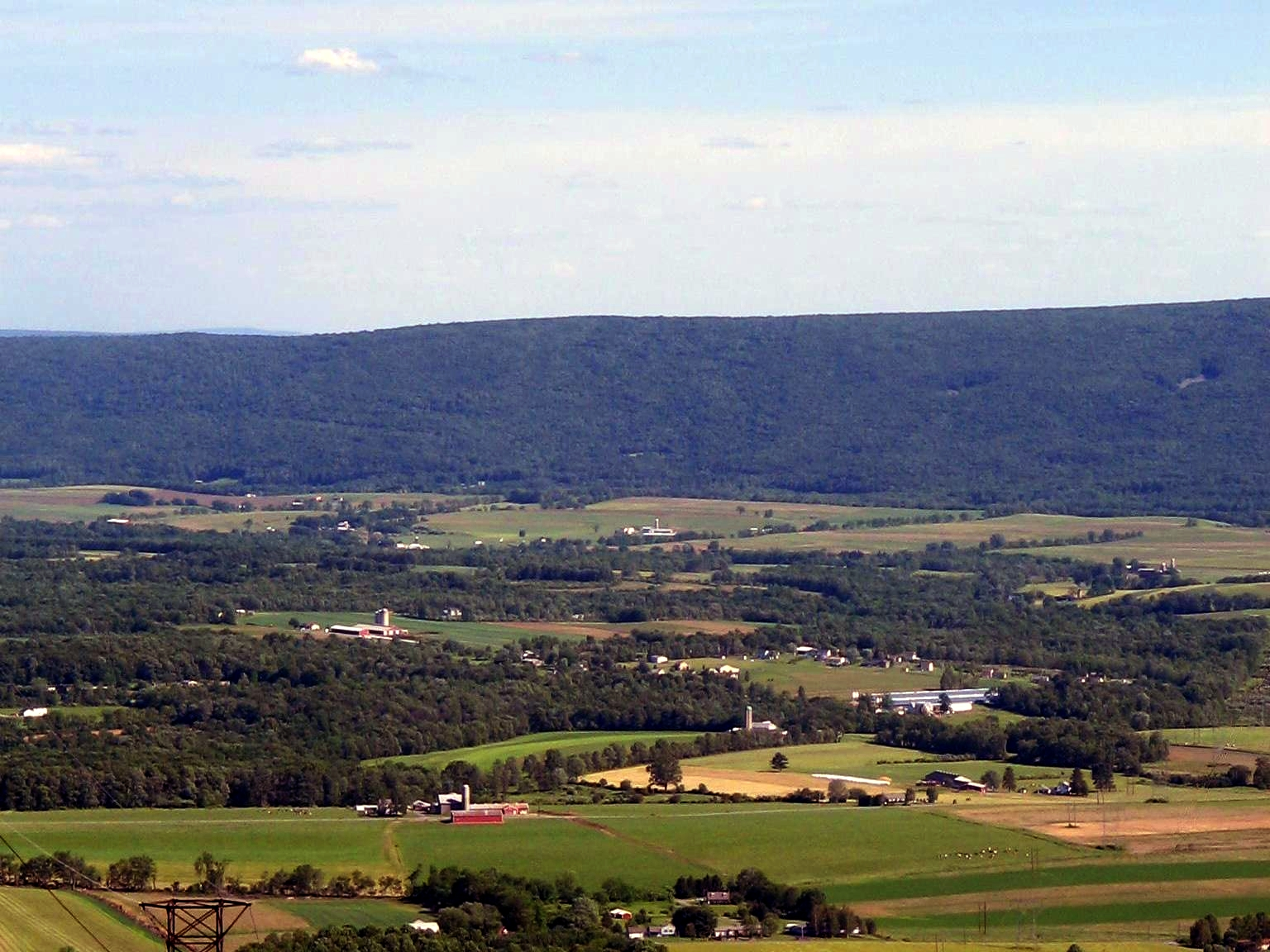
Farms and woodlands in Washington Township with the second-growth Tiadaghton State Forest on South White Deer Ridge behind

Washington Township is in southern Lycoming County and is bordered by Clinton County to the west, Limestone Township to the northwest, Armstrong Township to the north, Brady Township to the northeast, and Union County to the east and south. It is 10 miles (16 km) south of Williamsport, the Lycoming county seat, and 78 miles (126 km) north of Harrisburg, the state capital. Pennsylvania Route 44 crosses the township, passing through Elimsport, the one unincorporated community in the township. PA-44 leads east from Elimsport 6 miles (10 km) to Allenwood on the West Branch of the Susquehanna River and northwest over North White Deer Ridge 16 miles (26 km) to Jersey Shore, also on the West Branch.

According to the United States Census Bureau, the township has a total area of 48.33 square miles (125.2 km^{2}), of which 0.11 square miles (0.28 km^{2}), or 0.23%, are water.

== Demographics ==
Historical population
Census	Pop.	Note	%±
2010	1,619		—
2020	1,769		9.3%
2021 (est.)	1,761		−0.5%
U.S. Decennial Census

As of the census of 2000, there were 1,613 people, 549 households, and 462 families residing in the township. The population density was 33.2 inhabitants per square mile (12.8/km^{2}). There were 639 housing units at an average density of 13.2/sq mi (5.1/km^{2}). The racial makeup of the township was 98.57% White, 0.19% African American, 0.37% Native American, 0.12% Asian, 0.12% from other races, and 0.62% from two or more races. Hispanic or Latino of any race were 0.19% of the population.

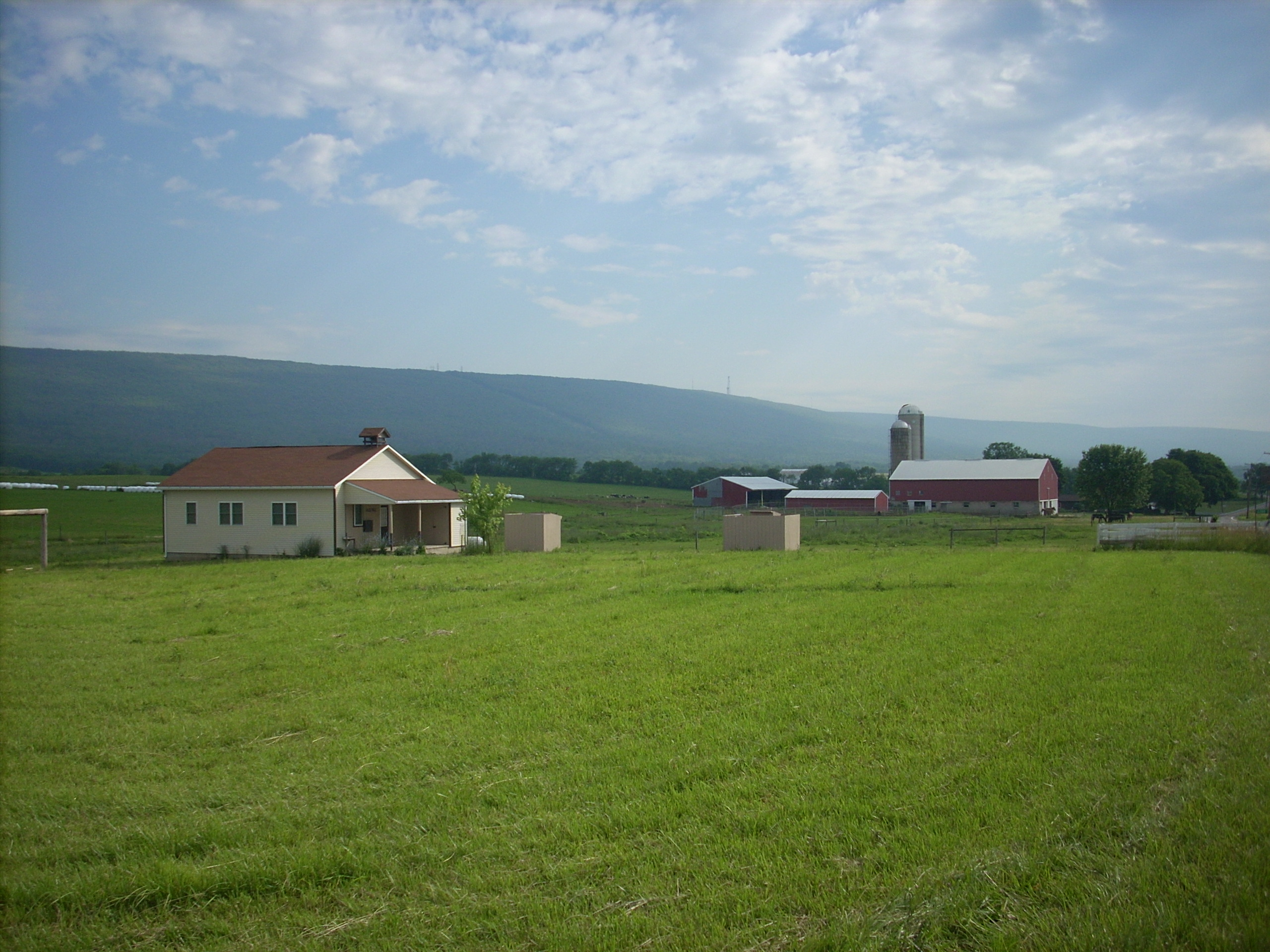
An Amish school just off PA Rt. 554

There were 549 households, out of which 39.2% had children under the age of 18 living with them, 76.7% were married couples living together, 4.7% had a female householder with no husband present, and 15.8% were non-families. 13.1% of all households were made up of individuals, and 6.0% had someone living alone who was 65 years of age or older. The average household size was 2.94 and the average family size was 3.21.

In the township the population was spread out, with 28.9% under the age of 18, 7.1% from 18 to 24, 28.5% from 25 to 44, 24.5% from 45 to 64, and 11.1% who were 65 years of age or older. The median age was 36 years. For every 100 females there were 108.4 males. For every 100 females age 18 and over, there were 104.5 males.

The median income for a household in the township was $41,739, and the median income for a family was $45,804. Males had a median income of $31,098 versus $22,031 for females. The per capita income for the township was $17,124. About 6.5% of families and 10.3% of the population were below the poverty line, including 17.4% of those under age 18 and 4.0% of those age 65 or over.
