= Brady Township, Lycoming County, Pennsylvania =

Township in Pennsylvania, US

- Township
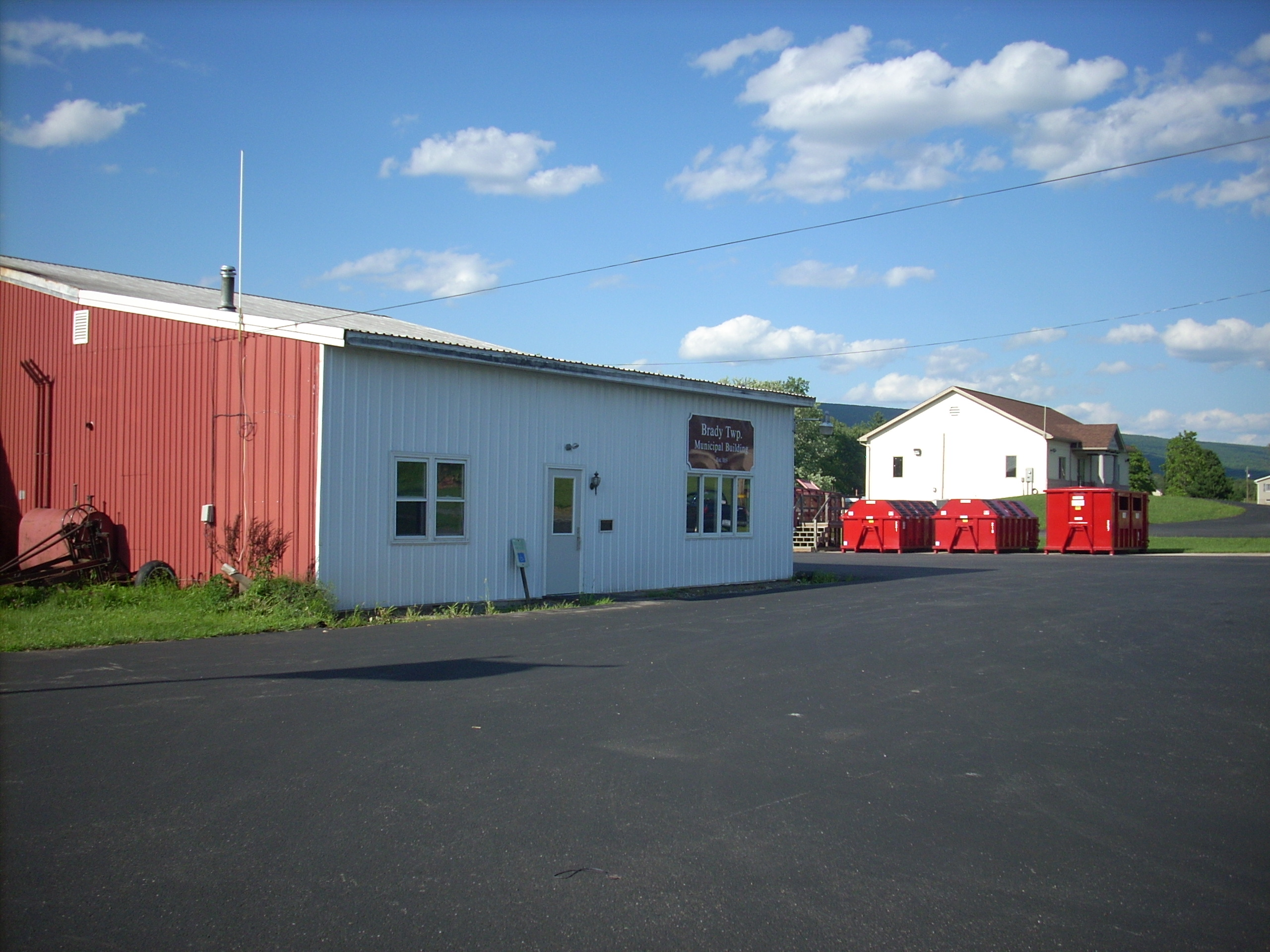
- Township municipal building

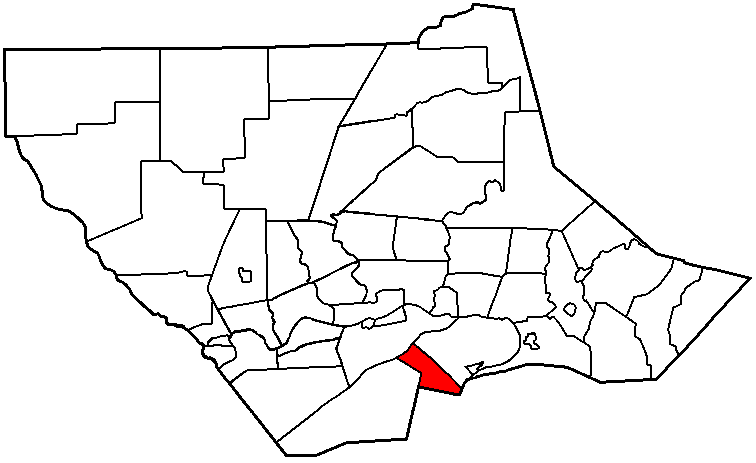
- Map of Lycoming County, Pennsylvania highlighting Brady Township

- Map of Lycoming County, Pennsylvania
- Coordinates: 41°10′26″N 76°56′39″W
- Country: United States
- State: Pennsylvania
- County: Lycoming
- Settled: 1790
- Formed: 1855

Area
  - Total: 9.05 sq mi (23.45 km^{2})
  - Land: 8.84 sq mi (22.90 km^{2})
  - Water: 0.21 sq mi (0.54 km^{2})
- Elevation: 659 ft (201 m)

Population (2020)
  - Total: 521
  - Estimate (2021): 499
  - Density: 61/sq mi (23.4/km^{2})
- Time zone: UTC-5 (Eastern Time Zone (North America))
  - Summer (DST): UTC-4 (EDT)
- ZIP code: 17752
- Area code: 570
- FIPS code: 42-081-08136
- GNIS feature ID: 1216741
- Website: www.bradytownship.com

Brady Township is a township in Lycoming County, Pennsylvania, United States. The population was 502 at the 2020 census. It is part of the Williamsport Metropolitan Statistical Area.

== History ==
Brady Township was formed from Washington Township on January 31, 1855. It was named for the Brady family, several of whom lived within its limits. Until 1861, Brady Township also included what is now Gregg Township, Union County.

One of the most prominent early residents of Brady Township was Judge William Piatt, who was born and raised in the area that is now Brady Township. His father, John Piatt, moved to the southern part of Lycoming County from New Jersey and established a tannery. William was born on January 29, 1795, and followed his father into the tannery business. He soon took an interest in the local political scene and was elected to the Pennsylvania General Assembly in 1830. He served as a legislator for three terms. Piatt became an associate judge in 1855. Piatt also served Lycoming County and Brady Township as a county auditor and as a president of both a turnpike and a bridge company.

== Geography ==
Brady Township is bordered by Clinton Township to the northeast, the West Branch Susquehanna River on the southeast, Union County to the south, Washington Township to the west, and Armstrong Township to the northwest. The community of Maple Hill is in the center of the township. The northwestern border of the township follows the crest of North White Deer Ridge.

Pennsylvania Route 54 (Elimsport Road) passes through the township, leading east 5 miles (8 km) to Montgomery and southwest the same distance to Elimsport. Williamsport, the Lycoming county seat, is 9 miles (14 km) north of the township via PA 54 and U.S. Route 15.

According to the United States Census Bureau, the township has a total area of 9.0 square miles (23.4 km^{2}), of which 8.8 square miles (22.9 km^{2}) are land and 0.2 square miles (0.5 km^{2}), or 2.32%, are water. It is the location of the Lycoming County Landfill and the northern part of the Federal Correctional Institute, Allenwood.

== Demographics ==
Historical population
Census	Pop.	Note	%±
2010	521		—
2020	502		−3.6%
2021 (est.)	499		−0.6%
U.S. Decennial Census

As of the census of 2000, there were 494 people, 177 households, and 149 families residing in the township. The population density was 57.2 inhabitants per square mile (22.1/km^{2}). There were 186 housing units at an average density of 21.6/sq mi (8.3/km^{2}). The racial makeup of the township was 99.80% White, and 0.20% from two or more races. Hispanic or Latino of any race were 0.20% of the population.

There were 177 households, out of which 31.6% had children under the age of 18 living with them, 73.4% were married couples living together, 5.1% had a female householder with no husband present, and 15.8% were non-families. 11.9% of all households were made up of individuals, and 5.6% had someone living alone who was 65 years of age or older. The average household size was 2.79 and the average family size was 2.96.

In the township the population was spread out, with 24.5% under the age of 18, 5.9% from 18 to 24, 30.2% from 25 to 44, 28.5% from 45 to 64, and 10.9% who were 65 years of age or older. The median age was 40 years. For every 100 females there were 114.8 males. For every 100 females age 18 and over, there were 103.8 males.

The median income for a household in the township was $43,958, and the median income for a family was $45,313. Males had a median income of $30,294 versus $24,531 for females. The per capita income for the township was $17,789. About 2.9% of families and 6.7% of the population were below the poverty line, including 7.3% of those under age 18 and 14.3% of those age 65 or over.
