= Federal Correctional Complex, Allenwood =

Federal prison in Pennsylvania, USA

Coordinates: 41.12874°N 76.91534°W

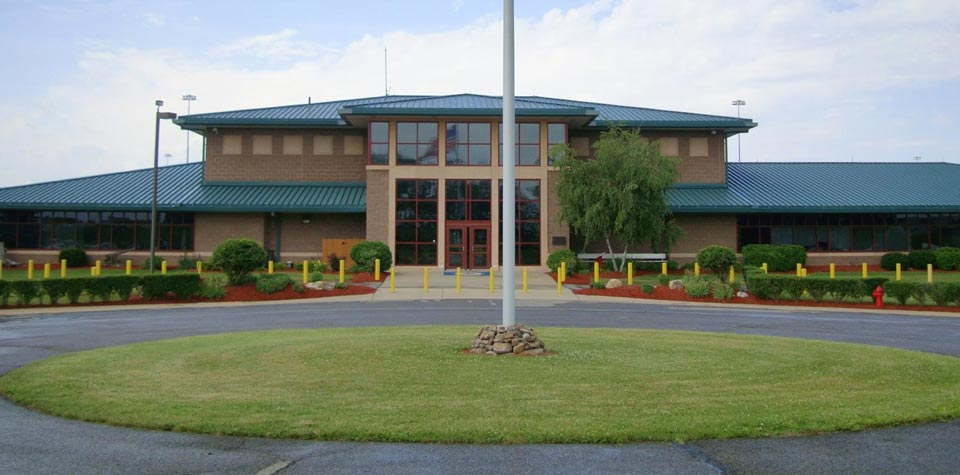
- Interactive map of Federal Correctional Complex, Allenwood
- Location: Gregg Township, Union County Brady and Clinton townships, Lycoming County, near Allenwood, Pennsylvania
- Status: Operational
- Security class: Low, medium, and high security
- Population: 2,900 (three facilities)
- Managed by: Federal Bureau of Prisons

The Federal Correctional Complex, Allenwood (FCC Allenwood) is a federal prison complex for male inmates in Pennsylvania, United States. It is operated by the Federal Bureau of Prisons, a division of the United States Department of Justice.

The prison property is located in the following townships: Gregg in Union County, and two in Lycoming County: Brady, and Clinton.

== Facilities ==
The complex consists of three facilities:

- Federal Correctional Institution, Allenwood Low (FCI Allenwood Low): a low-security facility
- Federal Correctional Institution, Allenwood Medium (FCI Allenwood Medium): a medium-security facility
- United States Penitentiary, Allenwood (USP Allenwood): a high-security facility

FCC Allenwood is located approximately 75 miles (121 km) north of Harrisburg, Pennsylvania, the state capital.

== Notable inmates ==
- Andrew Auernheimer, hacker better known as "weev"; released on April 11, 2014
- Carl Andrew Capasso, convicted of tax fraud; died in 2001
- James Alex Fields, perpetrated Charlottesville car attack in 2017 that killed one person and injured 35; serving a life sentence
- Jeffrey Grant, lawyer and minister convicted of loan fraud, co-founded Progressive Prison Ministries and the White Collar Support Group.
- James Holmes, perpetrator of the 2012 Aurora, Colorado shooting
- LaMarr Hoyt, baseball player, convicted of drug possession
- Mohammed Jabbateh, former Liberian warlord known as Jungle Jabbah; convicted of immigration fraud and perjury for lying about being a war criminal in the First Liberian Civil War
- Raymond Lederer, Democratic member of the United States House of Representatives, representing Pennsylvania's 3rd congressional district from 1977 to 1981. Convicted of bribery in 1981 after being implicated in the Abscam sting. Died in 2008 at his home.
- Inigo Philbrick, former art dealer; convicted of wire fraud
- Bruce Pierce, white supremacist member of The Order and murderer of Jewish talk show host Alan Berg; died in prison in 2010
- Tommy Pitera, hitman for the Bonanno crime family; inmate transferred to USP McCreary in Kentucky; currently at USP Big Sandy in Kentucky
- John Rigas, former CEO of Adelphia Communications Corporation; released as of February 22, 2016.
- Martin Shkreli, former hedge fund manager and CEO of Turing Pharmaceuticals; convicted of two counts of securities fraud and one count of conspiracy to commit securities fraud
- Ippei Mizuhara, former interpreter for MLB star Shohei Ohtani

== In popular culture ==
- Gil Scott-Heron's 1972 song "The King Alfred Plan" references Allenwood FCC as a possible location of one of the concentration camps set up for the CIA to imprison Black Americans in order to suppress a Black uprising, a theory derived from John A. Williams's 1967 novel The Man Who Cried I Am.
- In the HBO crime drama The Sopranos, characters Tony Blundetto and Angelo Garepe are mentioned as having served time at Allenwood FCC.

== See also ==
- List of U.S. federal prisons
- Federal Bureau of Prisons
- Incarceration in the United States
