= Allenwood, Pennsylvania =

Unincorporated community in Pennsylvania, US

Allenwood
- Census-designated place
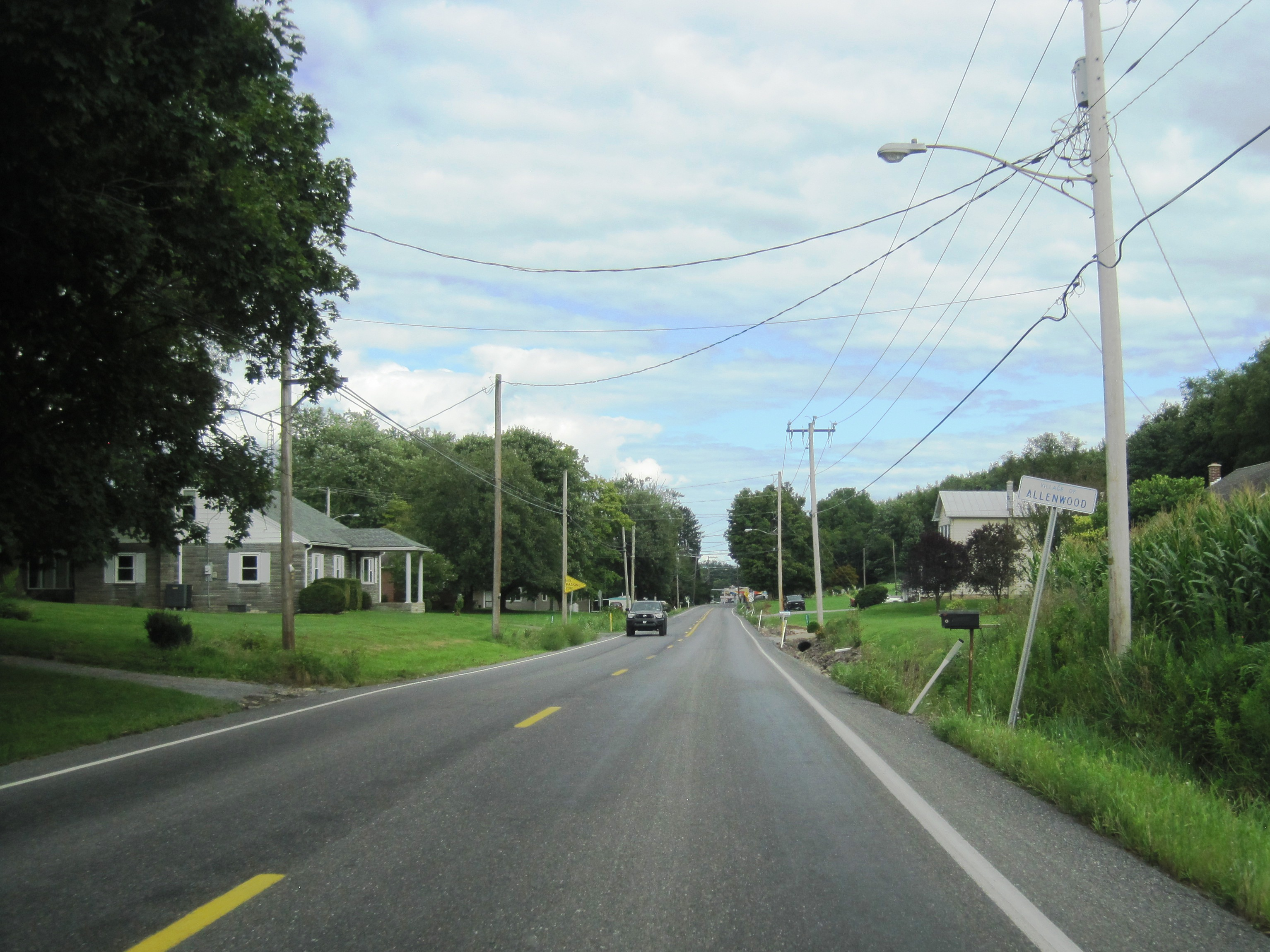
- PA 44 southbound entering Allenwood

- Location within Pennsylvania Location within the United States
- Coordinates: 41°06′27″N 76°53′54″W
- Country: United States
- State: Pennsylvania
- County: Union
- Township: Gregg

Area
  - Total: 0.59 sq mi (1.52 km^{2})
  - Land: 0.59 sq mi (1.52 km^{2})
  - Water: 0 sq mi (0.00 km^{2})
- Elevation: 495 ft (151 m)

Population (2020)
  - Total: 334
  - Density: 568.4/sq mi (219.47/km^{2})
- Time zone: UTC-5 (Eastern (EST))
  - Summer (DST): UTC-4 (EDT)
- Area code: 570
- GNIS feature ID: 1168202

Allenwood (also called Union Town) is a census-designated place in Gregg Township, Union County, Pennsylvania, United States. As of the 2020 census, Allenwood had a population of 334.

Federal Correctional Complex, Allenwood is located in Gregg Township, outside of the CDP boundaries.

== Demographics ==
Historical population
Census	Pop.	Note	%±
2020	334		—
U.S. Decennial Census

== Education ==
It is in the Warrior Run School District.
