= Gregg Township, Union County, Pennsylvania =

Township in Pennsylvania, US

Coordinates: 41°08′00″N 76°56′59″W

- Township
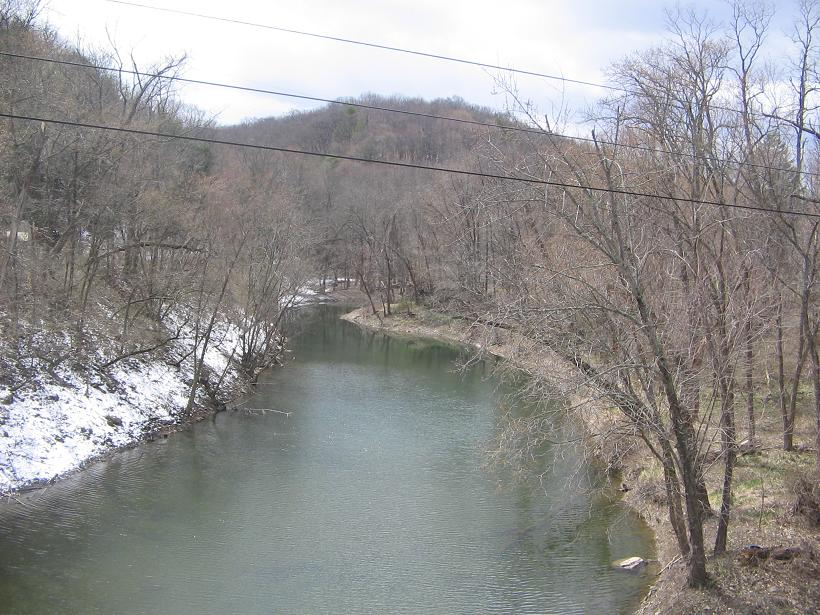
- White Deer Hole Creek, looking west from the U.S. Route 15 Bridge, in Allenwood

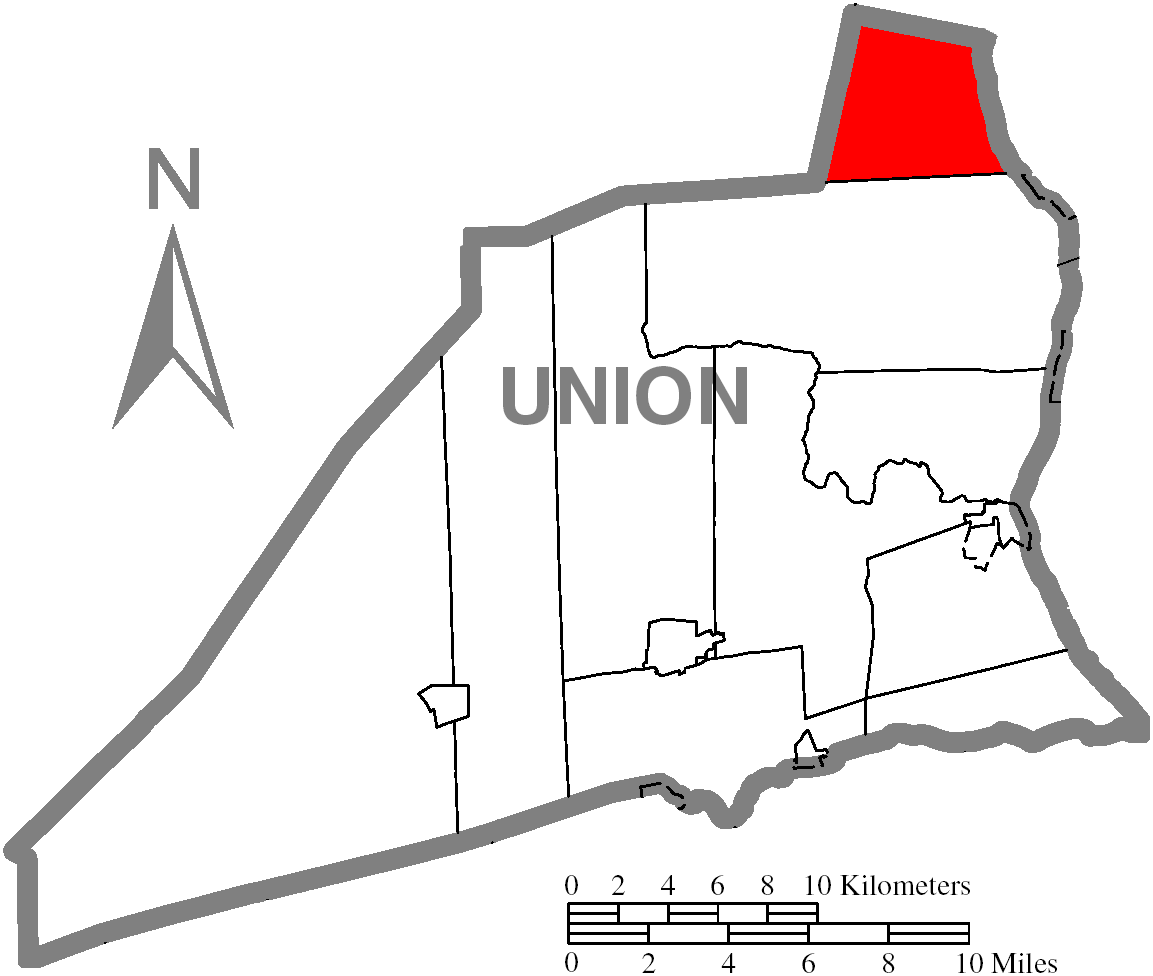
- Map of Union County, Pennsylvania highlighting Gregg Township

- Map of Pennsylvania highlighting Union County
- Country: United States
- State: Pennsylvania
- County: Union
- Settled: 1787
- Incorporated: 1865

Government
  - Type: Board of Supervisors
  - Chairman: David E. Masser
  - Vice-Chairman: Gloria R. Munsell
  - Treasurer: Paul L. Campbell, Jr.

Area
  - Total: 15.12 sq mi (39.15 km^{2})
  - Land: 14.89 sq mi (38.56 km^{2})
  - Water: 0.23 sq mi (0.59 km^{2})

Population (2020)
  - Total: 4,339 ▼
  - Estimate (2021): 4,335
  - Density: 324.1/sq mi (125.15/km^{2})
- Time zone: UTC-5 (EST)
  - Summer (DST): UTC-4 (EDT)
- Zip code: 17810
- Area code: 570
- FIPS code: 42-119-31480
- Website: Gregg Township

Gregg Township is a township in Union County, Pennsylvania, United States. The population was 4,339 at the 2020 census, of which 3,679 were federal inmates.

== History ==
Gregg Township, named for U.S. House Representative Andrew Gregg, was founded in 1865, having been carved out of Brady Township, Lycoming County in 1861.

The Allenwood River Bridge and Benjamin Griffey House are listed on the National Register of Historic Places.

== In the Township ==
The township shares Union County's rural character, with farms and woodlands predominating. Most of the unincarcerated population lives in the unincorporated hamlet of Allenwood. Just north of the hamlet on U.S. Route 15 is the Allenwood Federal Correctional Complex, with low, medium, and high-security federal prisons. With about 4,000 inmates, these facilities contain the great majority of the township's residents.

== Geography ==
According to the United States Census Bureau, the township has a total area of 15.1 square miles (39 km^{2}), of which 15.1 square miles (39 km^{2}) is land and 0.04 square miles (0.10 km^{2}) (0.13%) is water.

Gregg Township is bordered by Lycoming County to the west and north, the West Branch Susquehanna River to the east, over which lies Northumberland County and White Deer Township to the south.

Gregg Township is the entire portion of Union County lying within the White Deer Hole Valley. The creek flows east through the township from Lycoming County to its mouth in Allenwood. The southern boundary with White Deer Township runs along the South White Deer Ridge, which divides the White Deer Hole Valley from the White Deer Valley in White Deer Township. Though the creeks and valleys of the White Deer Hole Creek and White Deer Creek are distinct and divided by a ridge, the White Deer Hole Valley is also sometimes known simply as the White Deer Valley.

== Demographics ==
Historical population
Census	Pop.	Note	%±
2010	4,984		—
2020	4,339		−12.9%
2021 (est.)	4,335		−0.1%
U.S. Decennial Census

As of the census of 2000, there were 4,687 people, 335 households, and 249 families residing in the township. The population density was 310.5 inhabitants per square mile (119.9/km^{2}). There were 354 housing units at an average density of 23.5/sq mi (9.1/km^{2}). The racial makeup of the township was 55.17% White, 36.61% African American, 0.30% Native American, 1.94% Asian, 0.04% Pacific Islander, 0.34% from other races, and 5.59% from two or more races. Hispanic or Latino of any race were 20.57% of the population.

There were 335 households, out of which 34.6% had children under the age of 18 living with them, 63.9% were married couples living together, 6.0% had a female householder with no husband present, and 25.4% were non-families. 20.3% of all households were made up of individuals, and 8.7% had someone living alone who was 65 years of age or older. The average household size was 2.60 and the average family size was 2.99.

In the township the population was spread out, with 4.9% under the age of 18, 8.7% from 18 to 24, 63.3% from 25 to 44, 19.9% from 45 to 64, and 3.1% who were 65 years of age or older. The median age was 35 years. For every 100 females, there were 826.3 males. For every 100 females age 18 and over, there were 1,057.7 males.

The median income for a household in the township was $36,719, and the median income for a family was $41,711. Males had a median income of $16,270 versus $22,833 for females. The per capita income for the township was $12,916. About 4.5% of families and 14.0% of the population were below the poverty line, including 5.0% of those under age 18 and 5.2% of those age 65 or over.

== Government ==
Gregg Township is a township of the second class, governed by a board of three supervisors. The township has been zoned since 1968, with a three-member hearing board. This was the subject of a zoning battle in the early 1990s when a Texas waste company called USPCI attempted to locate a toxic waste incinerator across Route 15 from the Allenwood Penitentiary, leading to the local community to unite under the banner of the Organizations United for the Environment. Ultimately, the rezoning for the burner was not approved and an appeal was denied.

The Federal Bureau of Prisons Allenwood Federal Correctional Complex is located in the township.

== Education ==
The township is served by the Warrior Run School District.

== Notable person ==
- Seth Kinman, who became a California trapper, was born in the area
