= Pennsylvania Route 654 =

State highway in Lycoming County, Pennsylvania, US

Pennsylvania Route 654

Route information
- Maintained by PennDOT
- Length: 11.702 mi (18.833 km)

Major junctions
- West end: PA 44 in Limestone Township
- East end: US 15 in South Williamsport

Location
- Country: United States
- State: Pennsylvania
- Counties: Lycoming

Highway system
- Pennsylvania State Route System; Interstate; US; State; Scenic; Legislative
← PA 653	→ PA 655
← PA 602	→ PA 607

Pennsylvania Route 654 (designated by the Pennsylvania Department of Transportation as PA 654) is an 11.7-mile-long (18.8 km) state highway located in Lycoming County in Pennsylvania. It is known as West Southern Avenue and Riverside Drive in South Williamsport and Riverside Drive and Euclid Avenue in Duboistown. The western terminus is at PA 44 in Limestone Township. The eastern terminus is at U.S. Route 15 (US 15) in South Williamsport.

== Route description ==
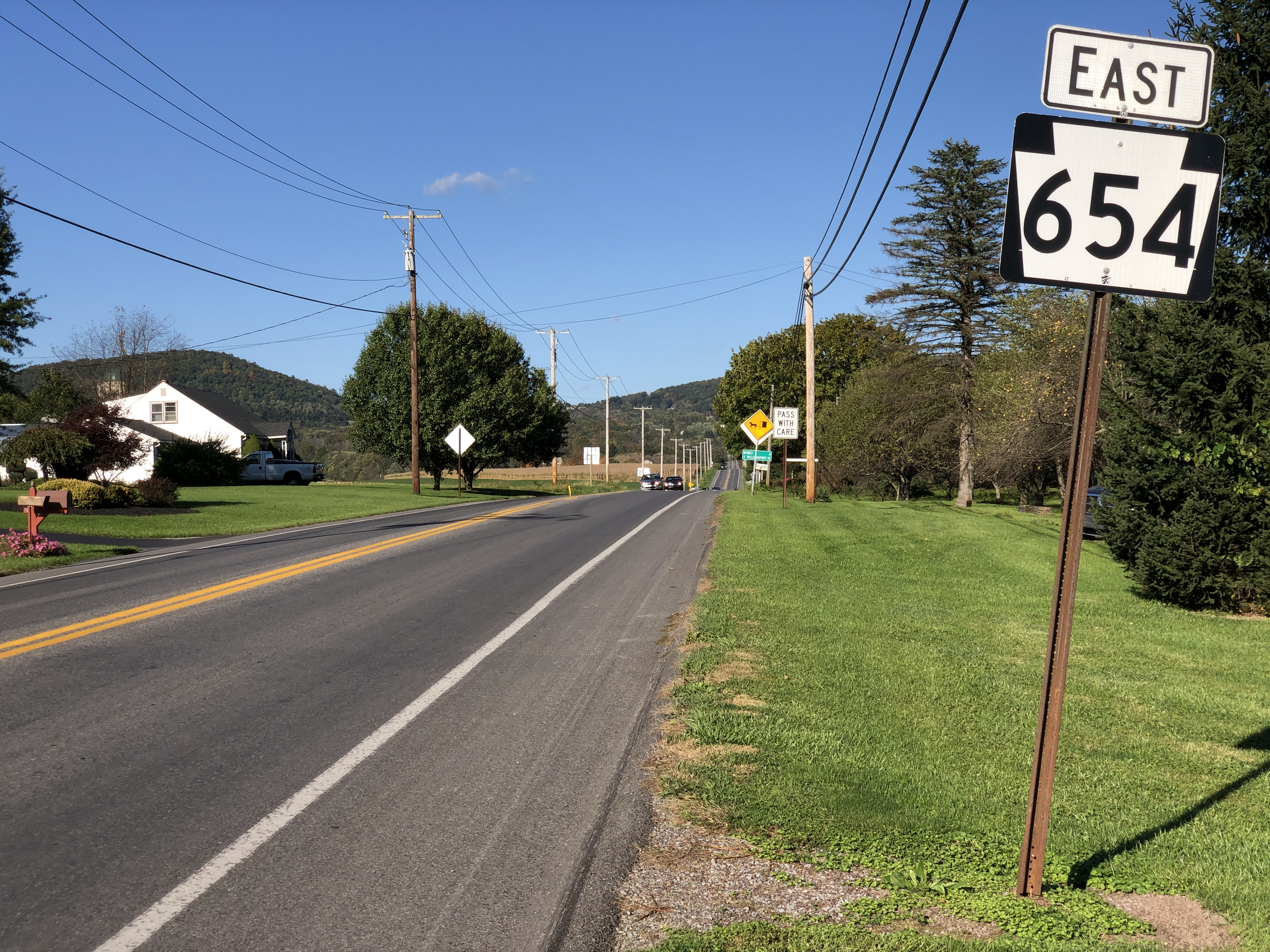
PA 654 from PA 44 in Limestone Township

PA 654 begins at an intersection with PA 44 in Limestone Township, just east of the hamlet of Oval. PA 654 proceeds to the northeast through several farms and leaves Limestone for Bastress Township, and almost immediately enters the hamlet of Bastress. After the intersection with Jacks Hollow Road, the route curves from the northeast to the northwest before an elongated curve back to the northeast north of the hamlet. At the intersection with Dincher Lane, PA 654 turns eastward, leaving the clearings for a dense woodland that contains another curve, this time to the north. After making this curve, the highway enters the hamlet of Nisbet, in Susquehanna Township. Unlike the forests that precede it, PA 654 through Nisbet is a stretch of residences on both sides of the highway. After making a curve to the east, the right-of-way merges with nearby East Village Drive, where the name of the road changes to Riverview Drive. At this point, PA 654 parallels the West Branch of the Susquehanna River and Norfolk Southern's Buffalo Line. After the merge, the route returns to its wooded setting for several miles along the West Branch.

After entering Armstrong Township, PA 654 forks to the southeast as Euclid Avenue, as the right-of-way continues as Cochran Avenue. Both roads enter the borough of Duboistown. PA 654 crosses through downtown, passing businesses on the west side of town. At the intersection with Arch Street, PA 654 is provided a connection to the city of Williamsport. After the intersection with Arch Street, Euclid Street continues further into downtown Duboistown, crossing through the center of town before intersecting with Riverside Drive and entering the community of South Williamsport. Paralleling US 15 on the opposite side of the river, the route soon intersects and merges with West Southern Avenue, which becomes to the route moniker through South Williamsport, passing local businesses and homes. At the intersection with South Market Street, PA 654 intersects with the southbound lanes of US 15, which had just crossed over the Susquehanna. The PA 654 designation ends at South Market Street, but Southern Avenue continues as State Route 2012 to meet the northbound lanes of US 15 at Hastings Street.

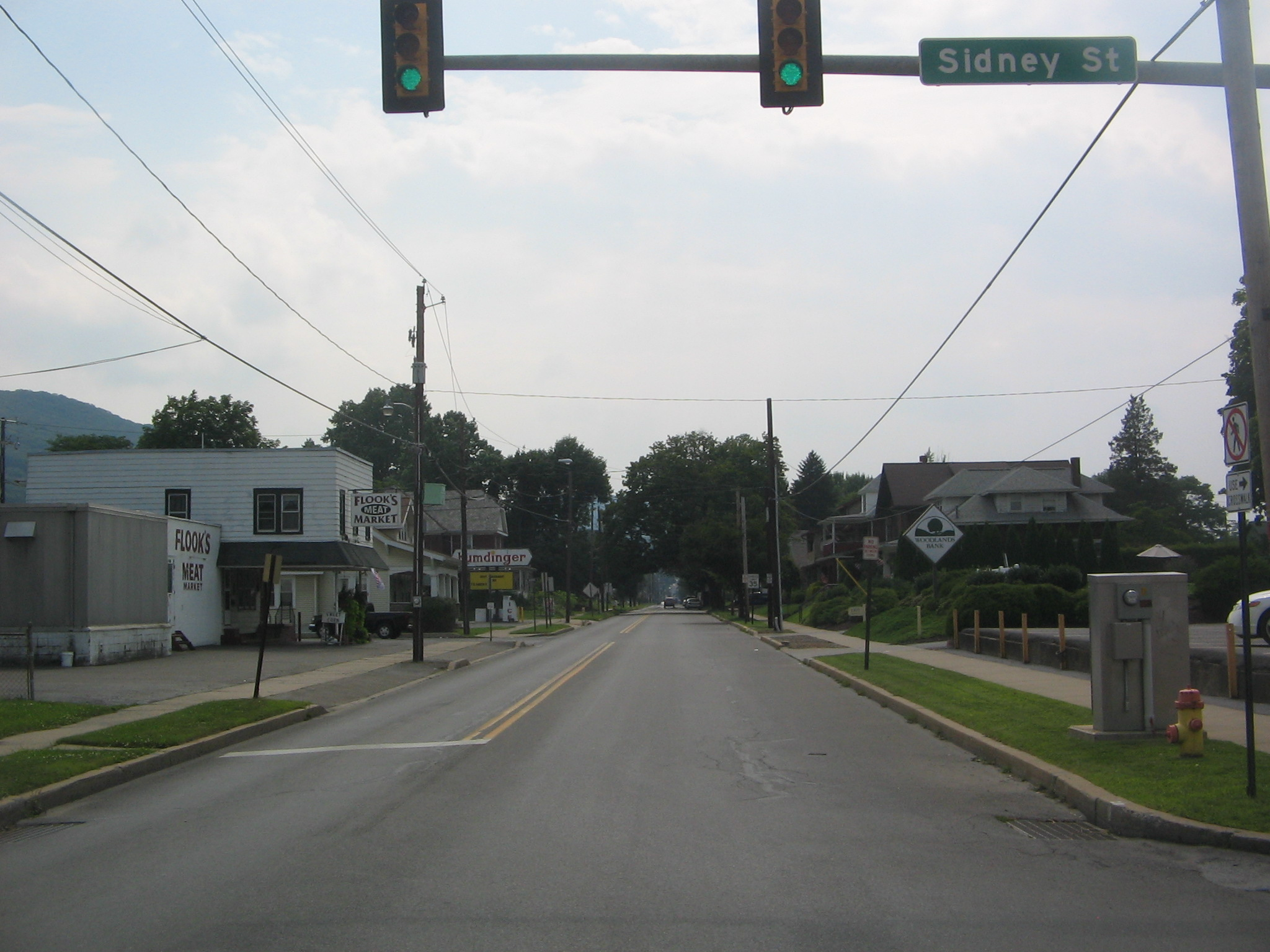
Looking west on PA 654 at Sidney Street and West Southern Avenue in South Williamsport

== Major intersections ==
The entire route is in Lycoming County.

Location	mi	km	Destinations	Notes
Limestone Township	0.000	0.000	PA 44 – Elimsport, Jersey Shore	Western terminus
South Williamsport	11.702	18.833	US 15 south (Market Street)	Eastern terminus
1.000 mi = 1.609 km; 1.000 km = 0.621 mi
