= Oval, Pennsylvania =

Unincorporated community in Pennsylvania, US

- Census-designated place
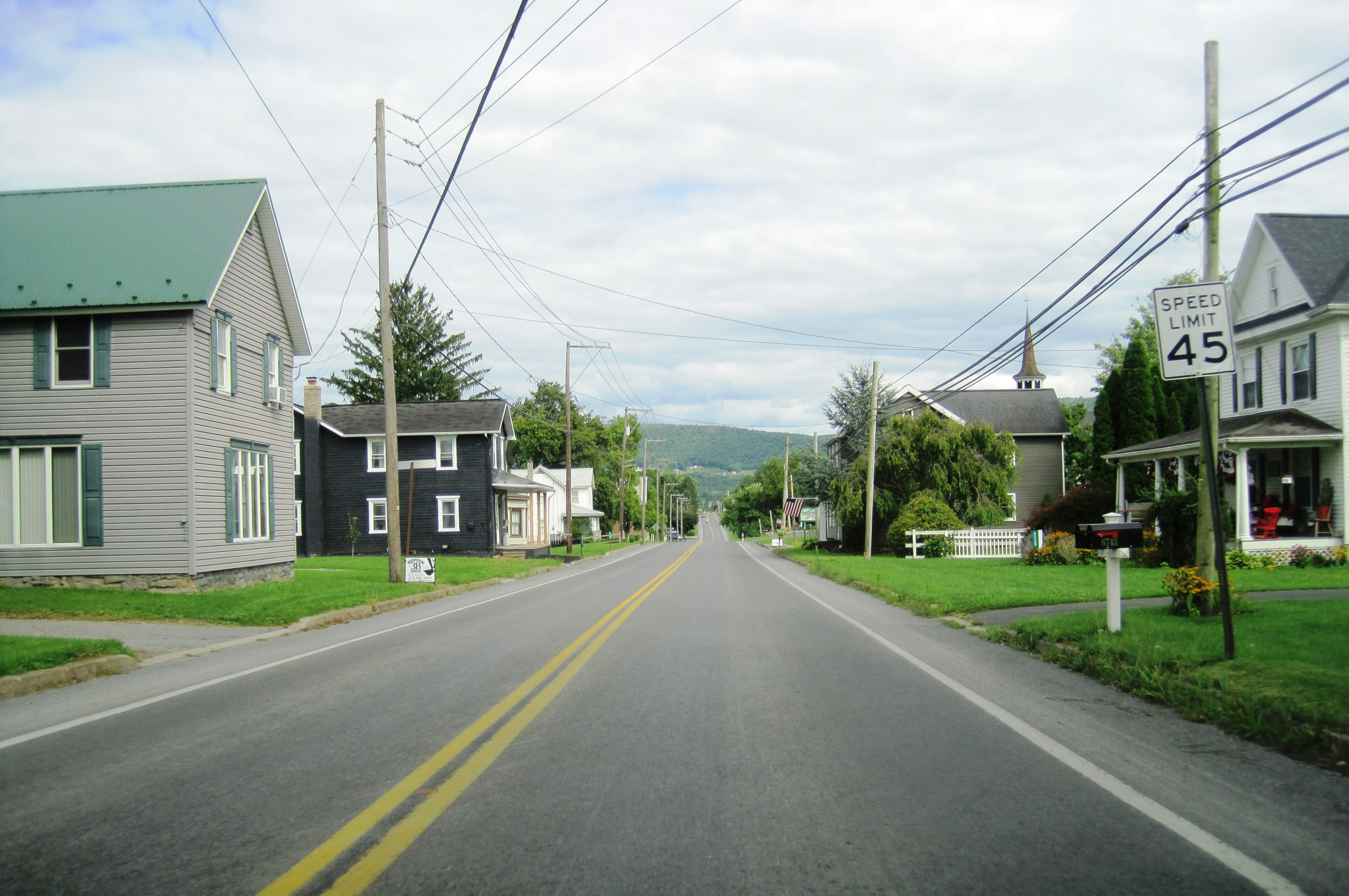
- PA 44 southbound in Oval

- Location within Pennsylvania Location within the United States
- Coordinates: 41°9′4″N 77°10′8″W
- Country: United States
- State: Pennsylvania
- County: Lycoming
- Township: Limestone

Area
  - Total: 1.10 sq mi (2.84 km^{2})
  - Land: 1.10 sq mi (2.84 km^{2})
  - Water: 0 sq mi (0.00 km^{2})
- Elevation: 813 ft (248 m)

Population (2020)
  - Total: 366
  - Density: 334.1/sq mi (128.99/km^{2})
- Time zone: UTC-5 (Eastern (EST))
  - Summer (DST): UTC-4 (EDT)
- ZIP code: 17702
- Area code: 570
- FIPS code: 42-57376
- GNIS feature ID: 1183132

Oval is a census-designated place (CDP) in Limestone Township, Lycoming County, Pennsylvania, United States. As of the 2010 census, it had a population of 361. Oval is not a separately incorporated community, but is a part of Limestone Township (which is a municipality under Pennsylvania law).

Oval is on Pennsylvania Route 44 in the north-central part of Limestone Township, in southwest Lycoming County. PA-44 leads northwest 7 miles (11 km) to Jersey Shore and U.S. Route 220, and southeast over North White Deer Ridge 16 miles (26 km) to Allenwood and U.S. Route 15. Williamsport, the Lycoming county seat, is 13 miles (21 km) to the northeast via PA-654.

According to the U.S. Census Bureau, the Oval CDP has an area of 1.1 square miles (2.8 km^{2}), all land. It is in the eastern part of the Nippenose Valley and is drained by tributaries of Antes Creek, a northwest-flowing tributary of the West Branch Susquehanna River.

== Demographics ==
Historical population
Census	Pop.	Note	%±
2020	366		—
U.S. Decennial Census
