= Limestone Township, Lycoming County, Pennsylvania =

Township in Pennsylvania, US

- Township
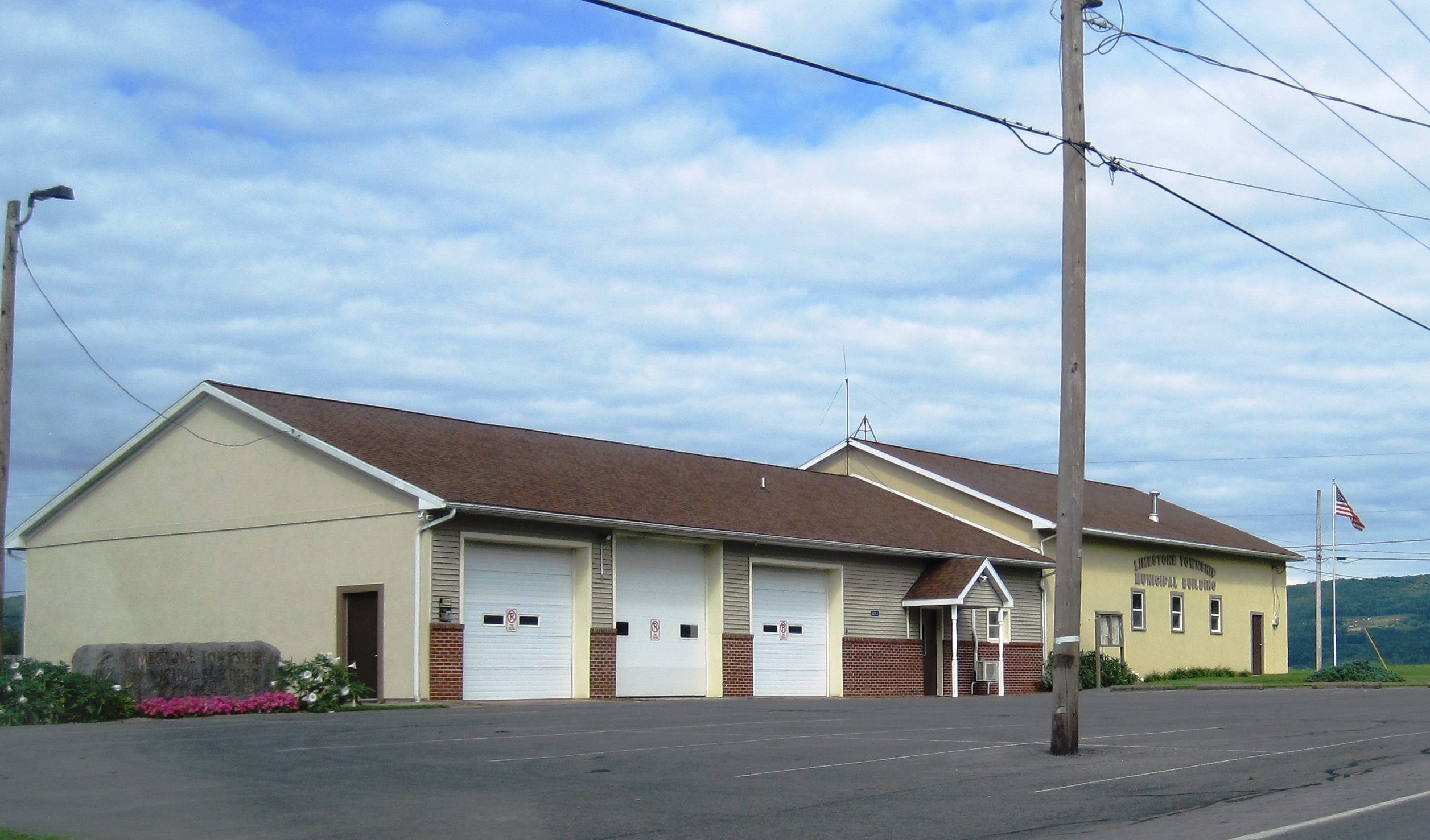
- Township municipal building

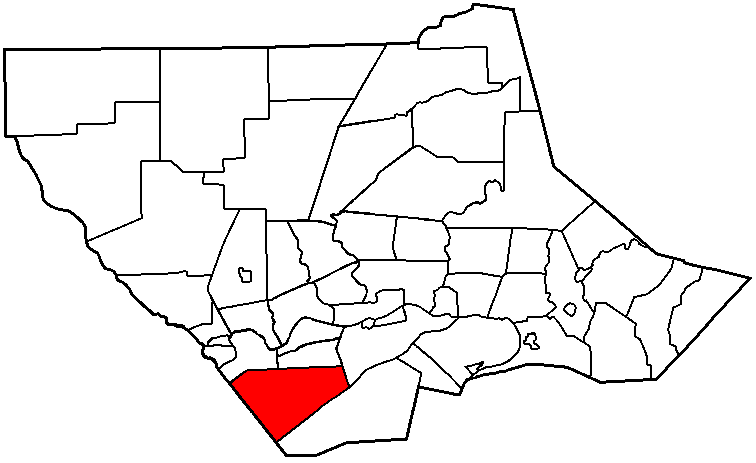
- Map of Lycoming County, Pennsylvania highlighting Limestone Township

- Map of Lycoming County, Pennsylvania
- Coordinates: 41°8′35″N 77°10′1″W
- Country: United States
- State: Pennsylvania
- County: Lycoming
- Settled: 1789
- Incorporated: 1824

Area
  - Total: 33.75 sq mi (87.40 km^{2})
  - Land: 33.62 sq mi (87.07 km^{2})
  - Water: 0.13 sq mi (0.33 km^{2})
- Elevation: 1,493 ft (455 m)

Population (2020)
  - Total: 1,968 ▼
  - Estimate (2021): 1,961
  - Density: 60.0/sq mi (23.15/km^{2})
- Time zone: UTC-5 (Eastern (EST))
  - Summer (DST): UTC-4 (EDT)
- Area code: 570
- FIPS code: 42-081-43352
- GNIS feature ID: 1216754
- Website: http://www.limestonetwp.org/

Limestone Township is a township in Lycoming County, Pennsylvania, United States. The population was 1,968 at the 2020 census. It is part of the Williamsport Metropolitan Statistical Area.

== History ==
Limestone Township was established on December 4, 1824, by the Court of Quarter Sessions of the Peace of Lycoming County. It was formed from parts of Nippenose and Wayne townships. Limestone Township was known as "Adams Township" in honor of United States President John Adams until April 14, 1835, when the name as changed to what was deemed to be a more appropriate title.

Upon arriving in present-day Limestone Township in 1789, the first settlers deemed it barren because the base of valley was covered by thickets of thorny bushes and was largely free of trees. At first the land sold for as little as fifty cents an acre. After the initial settlers cleared the shrubbery and planted wheat, the land was found to be quite fertile, and prices rose to $5.00 per acre. Later settlers to Limestone Township established the communities of Collomsville, Oriole and Oval. These small towns were the locations of small taverns, general stores and sawmills. By the 1890s, land sold for as much as $100 per acre.

Much of the farmland in the southeastern portion of Limestone Township was purchased by the Williamsport Water Authority in the early 1900s as part of its watershed. Visitors to the "water company" lands can see the stone remains of the early settlers homesteads spread throughout the watershed.

The water authority built a multimillion-dollar water filtration plant in the 1990s in Mosquito Valley. With the construction of this plant, the lands of the water authority were opened to the general public as a nature preserve, with limited hunting permitted at certain times of the year.

== Geography ==
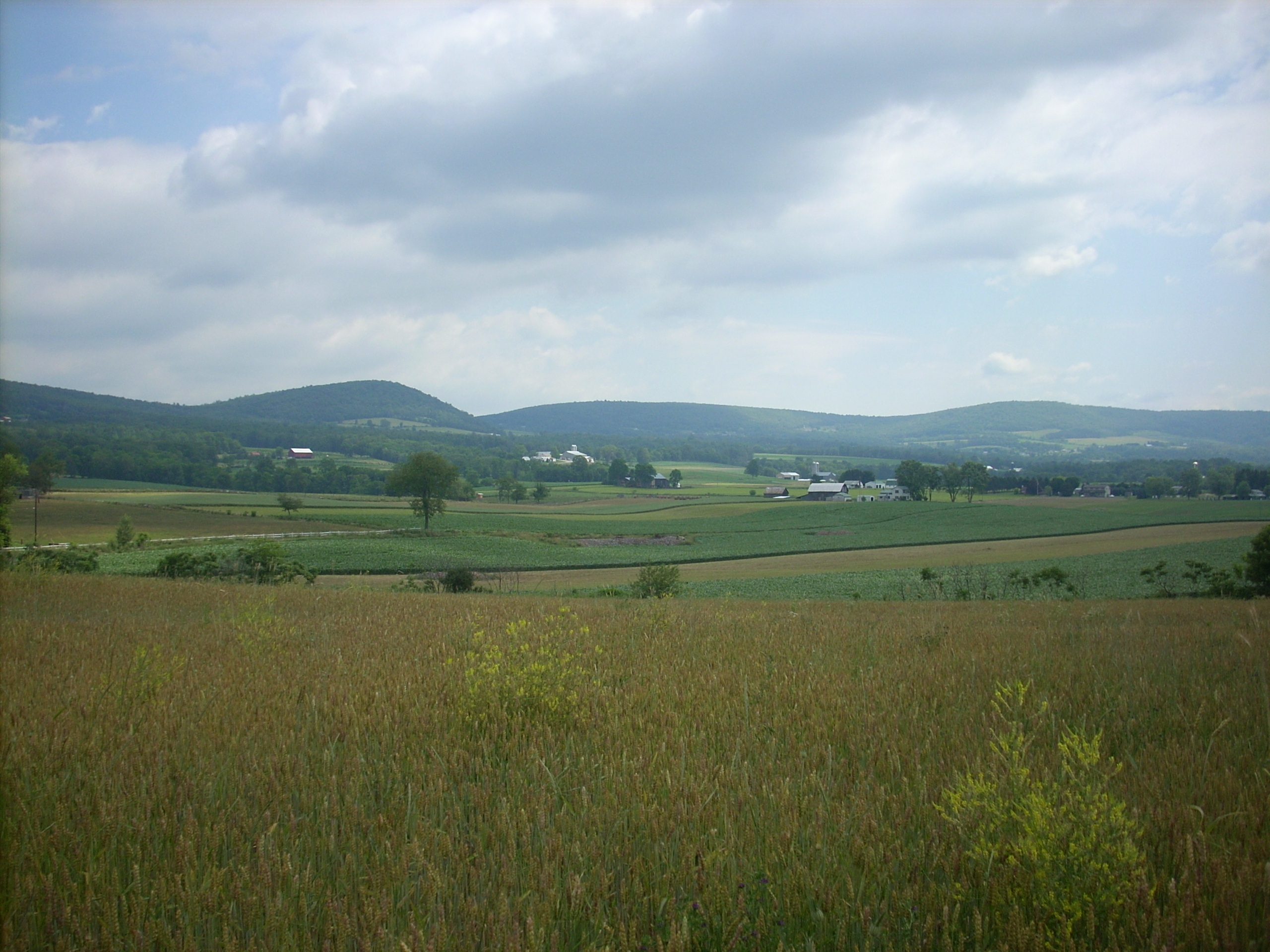
Farmland in Limestone Township

Limestone Township is in southwestern Lycoming County and is bordered by Washington Township to the southeast, Armstrong Township to the northeast, Bastress and Nippenose townships to the north, and Clinton County to the southwest. The Nippenose Valley (see below) occupies the central part of the township and is ringed by Bald Eagle Mountain to the north, North White Deer Ridge to the south, and unnamed connecting heights to the east. The unincorporated communities of Oriole, Oval, and Collomsville occupy the Limestone Township portion of the valley, with Oriole to the west, Oval in the center, and Collomsville to the east. The community of Rauchtown, mostly in neighboring Clinton County, extends into the westernmost part of Limestone Township.

Pennsylvania Route 44 passes through Oval and Collomsville, leading east-southeast 16 miles (26 km) to Allenwood and northwest 7 miles (11 km) to Jersey Shore on the West Branch Susquehanna River. PA 654 begins at PA 44 near Collomsville and leads northeast 11 miles (18 km) through Bald Eagle Mountain to South Williamsport. PA 880 begins at PA 44 near the northern boundary of the township and leads south and west 14 miles (23 km) to Loganton.

According to the United States Census Bureau, the township has a total area of 33.7 square miles (87.4 km^{2}), of which 33.6 square miles (87.1 km^{2}) are land and 0.1 square miles (0.3 km^{2}), or 0.38%, are water. Most of the township drains through the Nippenose Valley to Antes Creek, which flows north through Bald Eagle Mountain to the West Branch Susquehanna River at Antes Fort. The easternmost part of the township is in the Mosquito Valley, which drains northeast via Mosquito Creek to the West Branch at Duboistown.

=== Nippenose Valley ===
The Nippenose Valley, an anticlinal karst valley, occupies the central and northern parts of Limestone Township and extends west into Crawford Township in Clinton County. The valley is part of the northernmost fold sequence of the Ridge and Valley physiographic province of the Appalachian Mountains. The valley is uniquely bowl-shaped and consists of a doubly plunging anticline. According to a research paper from the University of Akron, the center has been eroded, exposing carbonate rocks in the valley. There is an average total of about 470 m (1,540 ft) of Lower to Middle Ordovician limestone and dolomite underlying the valley. The Reedsville Shale is stratigraphically above them and overlain by the ridge-forming Bald Eagle Sandstone. The valley has been intensely karstified, as evidenced by the numerous sinkholes, springs, caves, and disappearing streams. Rauchtown Creek enters the valley from the southwest and disappears underground in the western part of Limestone Township, reappearing 2 miles (3 km) to the north as Antes Creek.

Within a number of caves in this valley a new species of fish, a type of troglomorphic sculpin, was identified in 2003 by Luis Espinasa, an associate professor of biology at Marist College.

== Demographics ==
Historical population
Census	Pop.	Note	%±
2010	2,019		—
2020	1,968		−2.5%
2021 (est.)	1,961		−0.4%
U.S. Decennial Census

As of the census of 2000, there were 2,136 people, 689 households, and 580 families residing in the township. The population density was 62.7 inhabitants per square mile (24.2/km^{2}). There were 732 housing units at an average density of 21.5/sq mi (8.3/km^{2}). The racial makeup of the township was 98.78% White, 0.05% African American, 0.14% Native American, 0.23% Asian, 0.42% from other races, and 0.37% from two or more races. Hispanic or Latino of any race were 0.80% of the population.

There were 689 households, out of which 44.1% had children under the age of 18 living with them, 75.5% were married couples living together, 4.9% had a female householder with no husband present, and 15.8% were non-families. 13.2% of all households were made up of individuals, and 5.5% had someone living alone who was 65 years of age or older. The average household size was 3.10 and the average family size was 3.41.

In the township the population was spread out, with 32.0% under the age of 18, 8.3% from 18 to 24, 28.6% from 25 to 44, 22.6% from 45 to 64, and 8.6% who were 65 years of age or older. The median age was 34 years. For every 100 females there were 109.8 males. For every 100 females age 18 and over, there were 106.1 males.

The median income for a household in the township was $41,375, and the median income for a family was $44,219. Males had a median income of $31,543 versus $21,250 for females. The per capita income for the township was $15,180. About 5.7% of families and 7.0% of the population were below the poverty line, including 10.0% of those under age 18 and 7.0% of those age 65 or over.
