= Nippenose Township, Pennsylvania =

Township in Pennsylvania, US

Nippenose Township, Lycoming County, Pennsylvania
- Township
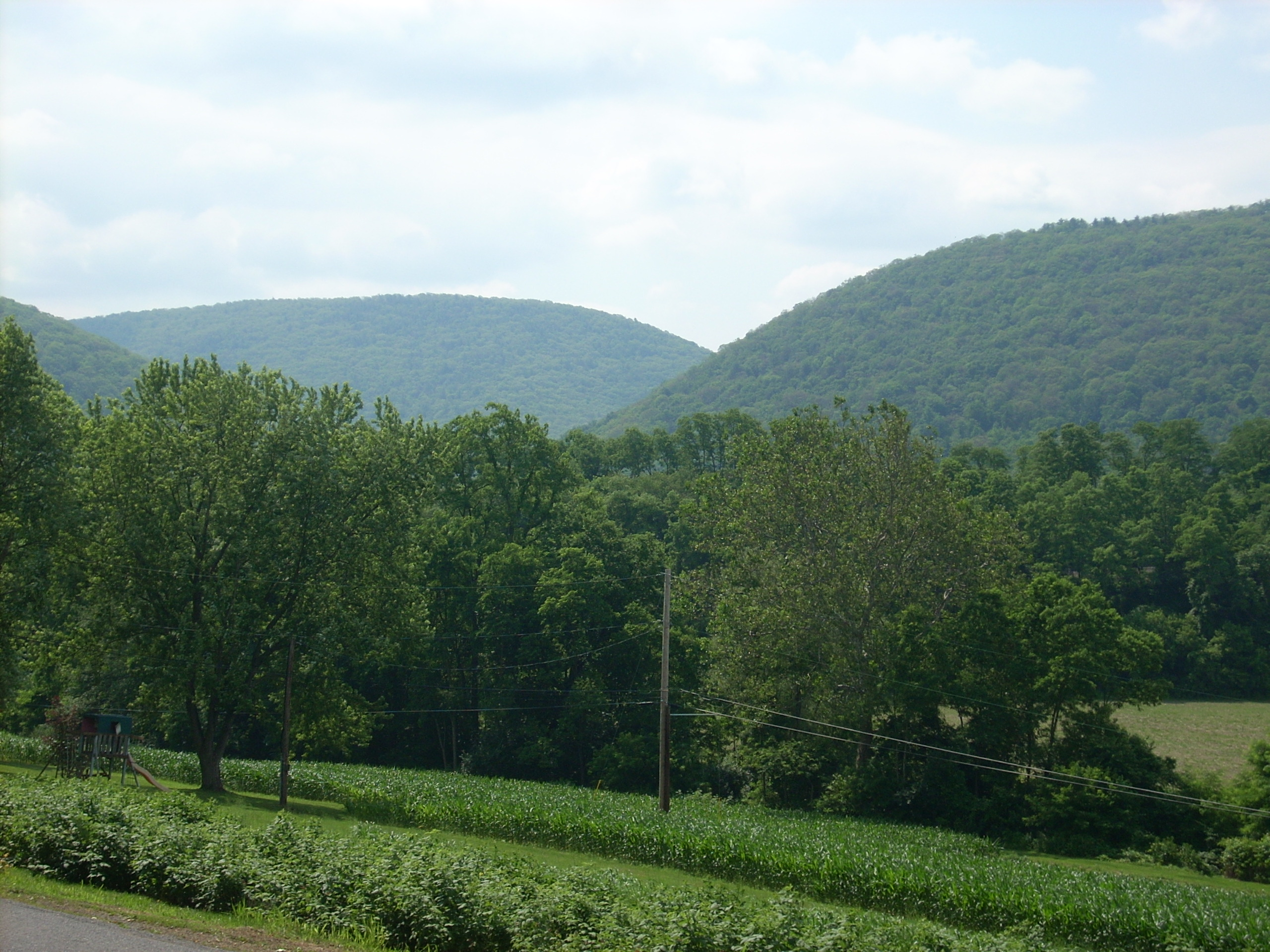
- A Nippenose Township vista

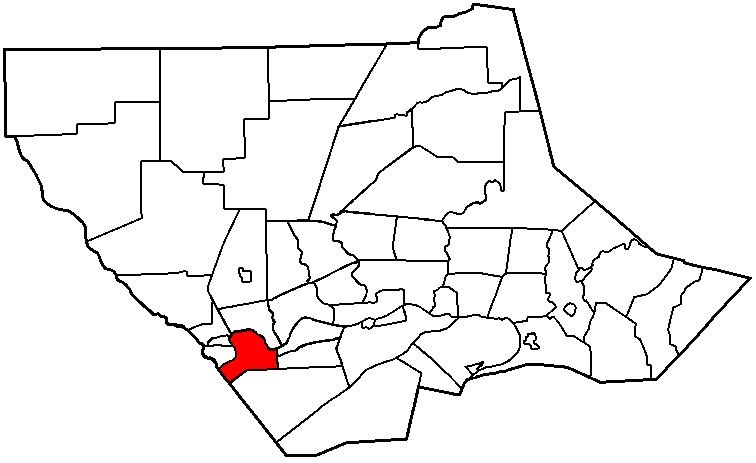
- Map of Lycoming County, Pennsylvania highlighting Nippenose Township

- Map of Lycoming County, Pennsylvania
- Coordinates: 41°11′34″N 77°13′43″W
- Country: United States
- State: Pennsylvania
- County: Lycoming
- Settled: 1769
- Incorporated: 1786

Area
  - Total: 11.52 sq mi (29.83 km^{2})
  - Land: 10.98 sq mi (28.45 km^{2})
  - Water: 0.53 sq mi (1.38 km^{2})
- Elevation: 1,467 ft (447 m)

Population (2020)
  - Total: 662 ▼
  - Estimate (2021): 658
  - Density: 66.0/sq mi (25.49/km^{2})
- Time zone: UTC-5 (Eastern (EST))
  - Summer (DST): UTC-4 (EDT)
- FIPS code: 42-081-54504
- GNIS feature ID: 1216765
- Website: www.nippenosetwp.com

Nippenose Township is a township in Lycoming County, Pennsylvania, United States. The population was 662 at the 2020 census. It is part of the Williamsport, Pennsylvania Metropolitan Statistical Area.

== History ==
Nippenose Township was formed as part of Northumberland County in 1786 by a session of the Northumberland County court that was held in Sunbury. It became part of Lycoming County when that county was formed from Northumberland County in 1795. Nippenose Township was originally much larger than it is today, spreading over parts of what are now Clinton, Centre and Lycoming counties. The population of Nippenose Township was 588 in 1890, compared to the slightly higher population of 709 as of the 2010 census.

=== Etymology ===
The story behind the name of Nippenose Township is unclear. There are three competing stories. One states that it is named for the Indian phrase "Nippeno-wi", meaning a warm and genial summerlike place. The second story behind the name claims that there was an old Indian named Nippenose who lingered in the valley after it was settled by whites. Apparently this man's nose had been "nipped" by exposure to the frost, hence the name "Nippenose". A third explanation of the name is that there is only one way into and out of the valley without going over a mountain. This gap is bordered on the west by a mountain with nip in the end of it, like a nipped nose.

=== John Henry Antes ===
The first colonial settlers arrived in the Nippenose area in 1769. Henry Clark was the first to arrive with a "warrant" to the land from the colonial Pennsylvania government. One of the most prominent early settlers was Colonel John Henry Antes. He is thought to have arrived as early as 1772. His last name is featured prominently in place names in Nippenose Township. Antes Creek, the main creek in the valley, and Antes Fort, a small village, bear his name. Antes built a stockade around his home, and his neighbors came to call it "Antes Fort". Colonel Antes also built a grist mill at the mouth of Antes Creek on the West Branch Susquehanna River in 1777. This mill was burned during the Revolutionary War.

During the American Revolutionary War, settlements throughout the Susquehanna valley were attacked by Loyalists and Native Americans allied with the British. After the Wyoming Valley battle and massacre in the summer of 1778 (near what is now Wilkes-Barre) and smaller local attacks, the "Big Runaway" occurred throughout the West Branch Susquehanna valley. Settlers fled feared and actual attacks by the British and their allies. Homes and fields were abandoned, with livestock driven along and a few possessions floated on rafts on the river east to Muncy, then further south to Sunbury. The abandoned property was burnt by the attackers. Some settlers soon returned, only to flee again in the summer of 1779 in the "Little Runaway". Sullivan's Expedition helped stabilize the area and encouraged resettlement, which continued after the war.

When things finally calmed down in 1792, Colonel Antes returned to Nippenose Township and rebuilt his mill. This second mill was a vital link in the economy of Nippenose Township until 1873 when a new mill was built in its place. Antes furthered his enterprises by building a carding and fulling mill on the banks of Antes Creek in 1810. Antes died in 1820. Ownership of the mills was passed onto his son-in-law Elias P. Youngman. Youngman and his sons expanded the business yet again in 1835 by adding machinery that was able to clean clover seed. Clover seed was very expensive at the time: a bushel of the seed sold for as much as $24.00. Clover was very important to farmers for providing ground cover and as a food supply for their grazing dairy cows.

=== Antes Fort ===
The village of Antes Fort rose up around the train station that was built in Nippenose Township to serve the borough of Jersey Shore, to the north across the West Branch Susquehanna River from Nippenose Township. Antes Fort went through several name changes. The surveyor who drew up the town plans called it "Granville". This name was seldom uses as the locals preferred to call it "Jersey Shore Station". The name "Antes Fort" was not bestowed on the village until 1861 when the United States Post Office established a branch there and named it in honor of Colonel Antes' stockade.

== Geography ==
Nippenose Township is on the south side of the West Branch Susquehanna River in southwestern Lycoming County. It is bordered by Susquehanna and Bastress townships to the east, Limestone Township to the south, and Clinton County to the west. To the northwest, across the West Branch, are Porter Township and the borough of Jersey Shore, and to the north, also across the West Branch, is Piatt Township.

Pennsylvania Route 44 crosses the township, passing just west of Antes Fort. The highway leads north into Jersey Shore and southeast 21 miles (34 km) to Allenwood.

According to the United States Census Bureau, the township has a total area of 11.5 square miles (29.8 km^{2}), of which 11.0 square miles (28.4 km^{2}) are land and 0.54 square miles (1.4 km^{2}), or 4.64%, are water.

== Demographics ==
Historical population
Census	Pop.	Note	%±
2010	709		—
2020	662		−6.6%
2021 (est.)	658		−0.6%
U.S. Decennial Census

As of the census of 2000, there were 729 people, 284 households, and 211 families residing in the township. The population density was 68.2 inhabitants per square mile (26.3/km^{2}). There were 296 housing units at an average density of 27.7 per square mile (10.7/km^{2}). The racial makeup of the township was 98.90% White, 0.14% from other races, and 0.96% from two or more races.

There were 284 households, out of which 31.3% had children under the age of 18 living with them, 60.9% were married couples living together, 8.1% had a female householder with no husband present, and 25.4% were non-families. 21.5% of all households were made up of individuals, and 8.1% had someone living alone who was 65 years of age or older. The average household size was 2.57 and the average family size was 2.97.

In the township the population was spread out, with 24.6% under the age of 18, 7.8% from 18 to 24, 28.3% from 25 to 44, 25.0% from 45 to 64, and 14.4% who were 65 years of age or older. The median age was 37 years. For every 100 females there were 98.6 males. For every 100 females age 18 and over, there were 103.0 males.

The median income for a household in the township was $40,357, and the median income for a family was $45,469. Males had a median income of $33,958 versus $19,167 for females. The per capita income for the township was $18,118. About 4.8% of families and 6.0% of the population were below the poverty line, including 6.7% of those under age 18 and 3.4% of those age 65 or over.

== Notable person ==
- Charles V. Stuart, California settler
