= Bastress Township, Lycoming County, Pennsylvania =

Township in Pennsylvania, US

Bastress Township, Pennsylvania
- Township
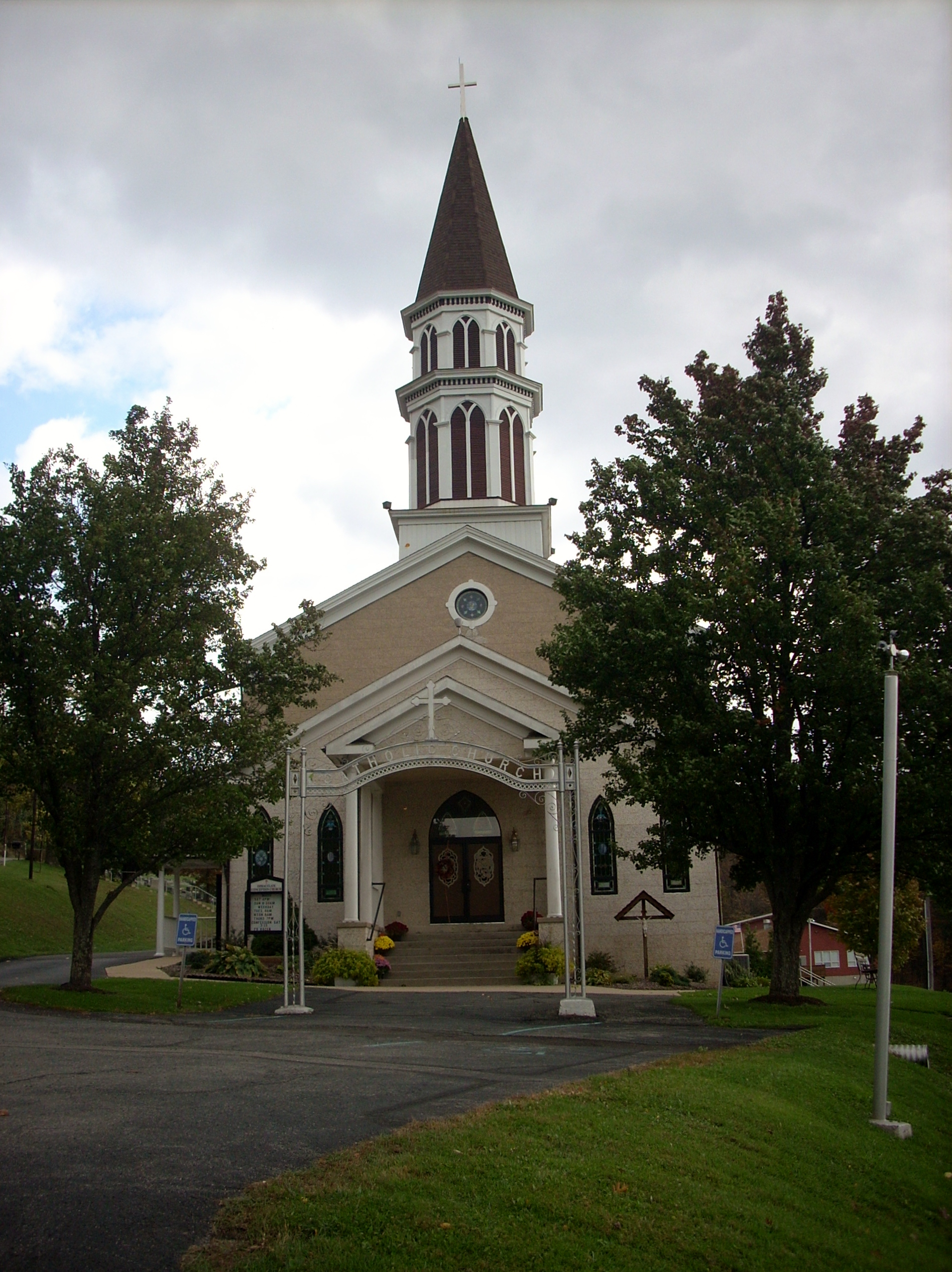
- Immaculate Conception Church on Jacks Hollow Road

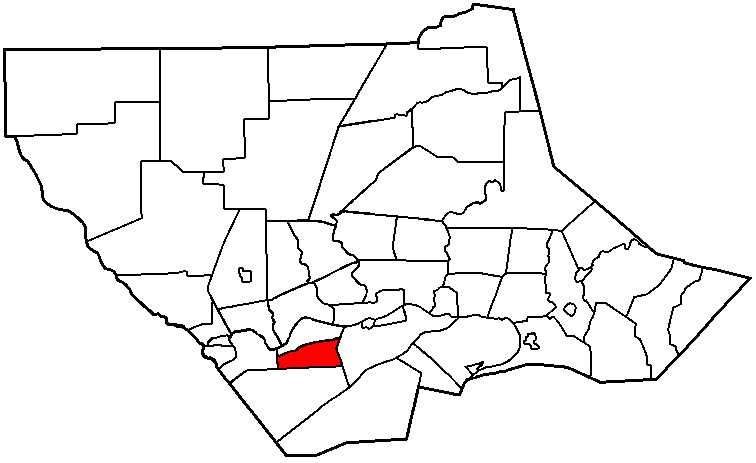
- Map of Lycoming County, Pennsylvania highlighting Bastress Township

- Map of Lycoming County, Pennsylvania
- Coordinates: 41°11′40″N 77°7′33″W
- Country: United States
- State: Pennsylvania
- County: Lycoming
- Settled: 1837
- Formed: 1854

Area
  - Total: 9.42 sq mi (24.41 km^{2})
  - Land: 9.42 sq mi (24.39 km^{2})
  - Water: 0.0077 sq mi (0.02 km^{2})
- Elevation: 1,722 ft (525 m)

Population (2020)
  - Total: 528 ▼
  - Estimate (2021): 525
  - Density: 59.2/sq mi (22.84/km^{2})
- Time zone: UTC-5 (Eastern Time Zone (North America))
  - Summer (DST): UTC-4 (EDT)
- ZIP code: 17702
- Area code: 570
- FIPS code: 42-081-04424
- GNIS feature ID: 1216740

Bastress Township is a township in Lycoming County, Pennsylvania, United States. The population was 528 at the 2020 census. It is part of the Williamsport, Pennsylvania Metropolitan Statistical Area.

== History ==
Bastress Township was formed from part of Susquehanna Township on December 13, 1854, by the Court of Quarter Sessions of the Peace of Lycoming County. The township is named in honor of Solomon Bastress of Jersey Shore, who was a former member of the legislature and an associate judge.

The first settlers were German Roman Catholic farmers. They migrated to the area beginning in 1837 under the leadership of the Jesuit missionary Father Nicholas Steinbacher. Together they built the first Church of the Immaculate Conception in 1838. The current stone church building was erected in 1860. The parish also established a cemetery and Catholic school soon after the settlement of Bastress. Immaculate Conception parish and school stand today as a reminder of the German Catholic heritage of the residents of Bastress Township.

Bastress has changed very little since its founding. The community is largely rural, and many of the residents are descendants of the first settlers. Since the 1890 census it has grown from a population of 236 to just 574.

== Geography ==
Bastress Township is bordered by Susquehanna Township to the north, Armstrong Township to the east, Limestone Township to the south, and Nippenose Township to the west. Pennsylvania Route 654 passes through the center of the township, leading northeast 10 miles (16 km) to Williamsport and south 2 miles (3 km) to its terminus at Pennsylvania Route 44 west of Collomsville in Limestone Township.

According to the United States Census Bureau, the township has a total area of 9.4 square miles (24.4 km^{2}), of which 0.01 square miles (0.02 km^{2}), or 0.08%, are water. The crest of Bald Eagle Mountain forms the township's northern border. Two streams, Big Run in the west and Bender Run in the east, rise in Bastress Township and flow north, cutting through Bald Eagle Mountain to reach the West Branch Susquehanna River. The southernmost part of the township drains south to the Nippenose Valley in Limestone Township, which is drained by Antes Creek, a north-flowing tributary of the West Branch. Bear Pen Hollow is a ravine in the southeast corner of Bastress Township which drains east to Mosquito Creek, which also flows north to the West Branch of the Susquehanna.

== Demographics ==
Historical population
Census	Pop.	Note	%±
2000	574		—
2010	546		−4.9%
2020	528		−3.3%
2021 (est.)	525		−0.6%
U.S. Decennial Census

As of the census of 2000, there were 574 people, 188 households, and 150 families residing in the township. The population density was 66.3 inhabitants per square mile (25.6/km^{2}). There were 201 housing units at an average density of 23.2/sq mi (9.0/km^{2}). The racial makeup of the township was 99.13% White, and 0.87% from two or more races. Hispanic or Latino of any race were 0.87% of the population.

There were 188 households, out of which 40.4% had children under the age of 18 living with them, 74.5% were married couples living together, 4.3% had a female householder with no husband present, and 19.7% were non-families. 17.6% of all households were made up of individuals, and 8.0% had someone living alone who was 65 years of age or older. The average household size was 3.05 and the average family size was 3.50.

In the township the population was spread out, with 31.7% under the age of 18, 6.6% from 18 to 24, 28.6% from 25 to 44, 22.6% from 45 to 64, and 10.5% who were 65 years of age or older. The median age was 37 years. For every 100 females there were 102.1 males. For every 100 females age 18 and over, there were 101.0 males.

The median income for a household in the township was $50,125, and the median income for a family was $54,844. Males had a median income of $34,306 versus $20,250 for females. The per capita income for the township was $17,880. About 2.6% of families and 4.0% of the population were below the poverty line, including 5.8% of those under age 18 and none of those age 65 or over.
