= Pennsylvania Route 664 =

State highway in Pennsylvania, US

Pennsylvania Route 664

Route information
- Maintained by PennDOT
- Length: 17.591 mi (28.310 km)
- Existed: 1930–present

Major junctions
- South end: PA 120 in Lock Haven
- North end: PA 44 in Haneyville

Location
- Country: United States
- State: Pennsylvania
- Counties: Clinton, Lycoming

Highway system
- Pennsylvania State Route System; Interstate; US; State; Scenic; Legislative
← PA 663	→ PA 666

Pennsylvania Route 664 (PA 664, designated by the Pennsylvania Department of Transportation as SR 0664) is a 17.59-mile-long (28.31 km) state highway located in Clinton and Lycoming counties in Pennsylvania. The southern terminus is at PA 120 in Lock Haven, while the northern terminus is at PA 44 on the Clinton-Lycoming county line in the community of Haneyville. The route passes through small communities, but does not intersect with any other legislated highways in the area.

The route was assigned in 1930, two years after a majority of state routes were assigned, and was gradually paved from 1935 to 1966. There have been no changes in road alignment since its inception.

== Route description ==
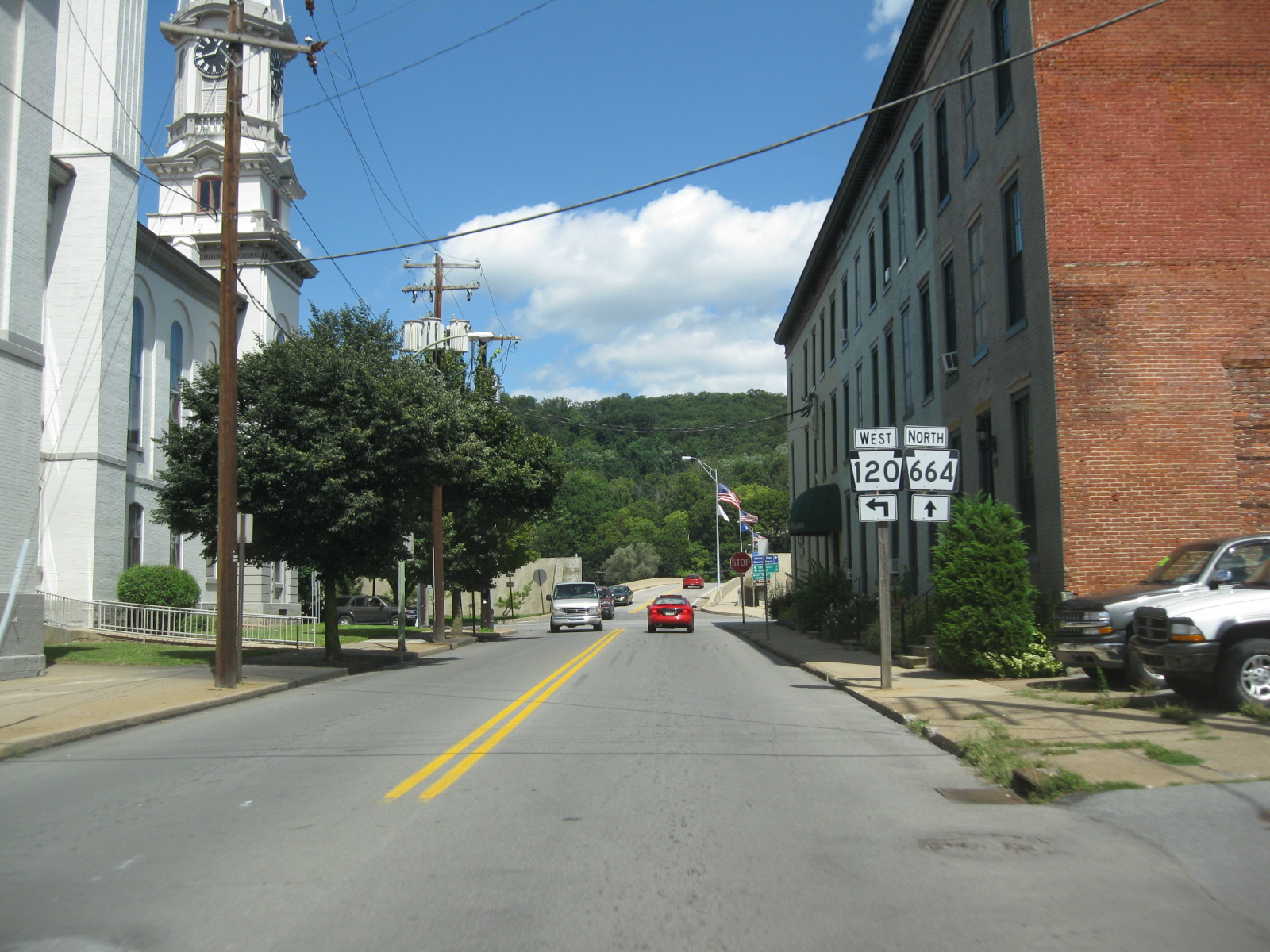
PA 664 begins at PA 120 in Lock Haven

PA 664 begins at an intersection with PA 120 in the city of Lock Haven. The highway progresses northward, leaving the city limits of Lock Haven. After the intersection with East Water Street, PA 664 crosses the West Branch Susquehanna River. The bridge over the branch of river was constructed in 1986. At the intersection with Farrandsville Road, the highway turns eastward, paralleling the river. Nearing PA 150, the highway turns northward and into Dunnstown. While winding around a few curves, PA 664 intersects with Armory Drive, an access road to a local armory. The route's surroundings are highly developed in Dunnstown, with the highway passing along homes. At the intersection with Aikey Street, PA 664 leaves Dunnstown and proceeds northward.

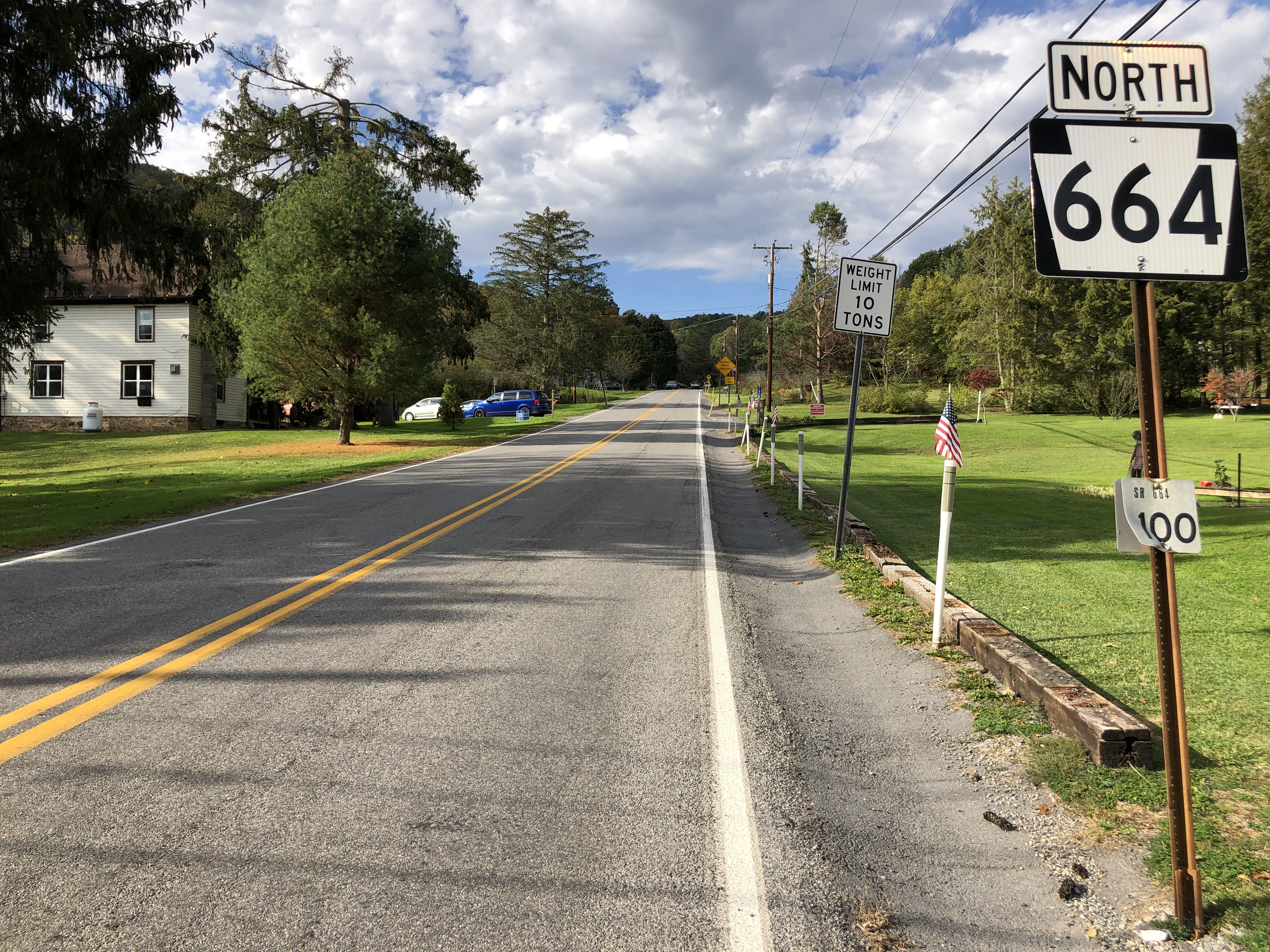
PA 664 northbound in Woodward Township

The highway passes some homes and forests north of Dunnstown, entering Woodward Township soon after. At the intersection with Township Road 406 (TR 406), PA 664 starts winding in several directions, but following a northward basis. This continues until the intersection with Arbutus Drive, where it heads straight to the northwest. At a clearing in a nearby forest, PA 664 enters the community of Swissdale. The stay in the community is short, with the highway leaving after a few blocks. Just north of Swissdale, PA 664 makes a long hairpin turn, curving from east to west before turning north once again. Just after the intersection with Honey Suckle Lane, PA 664 progresses towards Haneyville.

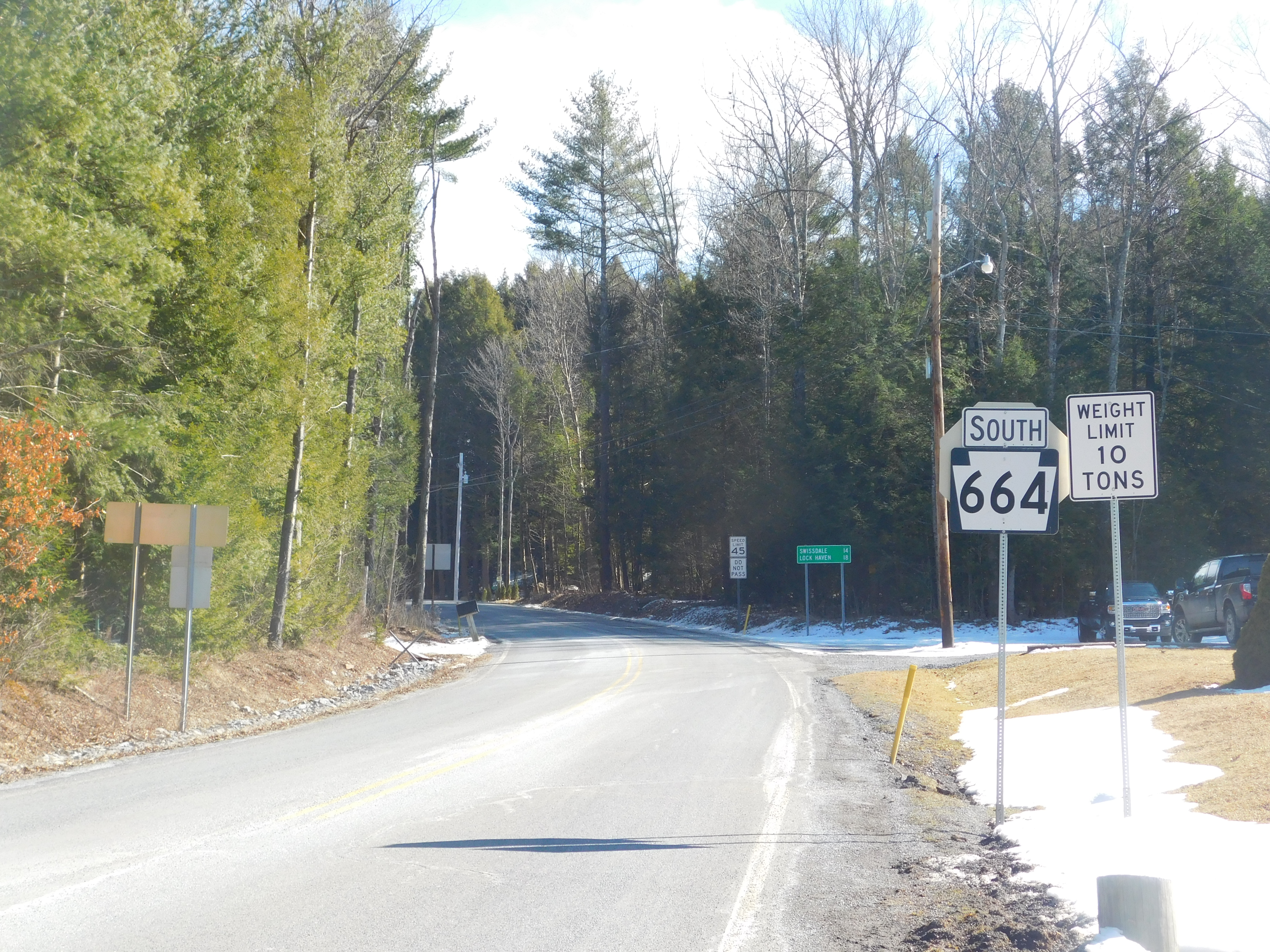
PA 664 in Haneyville from PA 44

The next stretch of PA 664 is full of bends, and the highway continuously turns at a constant rate. At an intersection with another Honey Suckle Lane, the highway starts its northwestern progression once again. This changes again when Tedrow Lane begins paralleling the highway. Now following a steady northeastern alignment, the highway continues through the large patches of trees south of Haneyville. At Little Plum Run Road, the highway turns onto a steady northward alignment. The highway continues through the trees for a while, continuing northward on its way to Gallagher Township.

At a bend in the highway, there is a small patch of development, with a few houses near the highway. At the intersection with TR 529, PA 664 enters Gallagher Township. Eventually, the large patch of forests in the surroundings come towards a clearing, where the highway intersects with Old Dirt Road. After crossing a stream, PA 664 gains the moniker of the Coudersport Pike. The highway passes a small patch of development, reaching another clearing in the forest. After entering another forest, PA 664 ends at an intersection with PA 44 in the community of Haneyville.

== History ==
PA 664 was assigned two years after the mass numbering of state routes in Pennsylvania in 1928. The highway itself took several years to transition from gravel to actual pavement. The first segment, which occurred in 1935, was from Little Plum Run Road and northward. The second segment was in 1936, when the Pennsylvania Department of Highways paved the piece of PA 664 from a point just south of Gallagher to the Gallagher Township line. In 1938, the third segment, from Swissdale to Gallagher Township was paved.

In 1949, the Department of Highways paved the piece of PA 664 from Gallagher Township to the Lycoming County line. In 1951, the section between Swissdale and Little Plum Run Road was paved once again. Two years after that, the section from the Lycoming County line to PA 44 was improved in its condition. That lone section was improved in 1966. There have been no recorded changes in alignment since its 1930 assignment.

== Major intersections ==
County	Location	mi	km	Destinations	Notes
Clinton	Lock Haven	0.000	0.000	PA 120 (Renovo Road) – Renovo	Southern terminus
Clinton–Lycoming county line	Gallagher–McHenry township line	17.591	28.310	PA 44 – Coudersport, Jersey Shore	Northern terminus
1.000 mi = 1.609 km; 1.000 km = 0.621 mi
