= Pennsylvania Route 44 =

State highway in Pennsylvania, US

Pennsylvania Route 44

Route information
- Maintained by PennDOT
- Length: 149.24 mi (240.18 km)
- Existed: 1927–present

Major junctions
- South end: I-80 / PA 42 in Buckhorn
- US 15 in Allenwood; Future I-99 / US 220 in Jersey Shore; US 6 in Coudersport
- North end: NY 417 at the New York-Pennsylvania border in Ceres Township

Location
- Country: United States
- State: Pennsylvania
- Counties: Columbia, Montour, Northumberland, Union, Lycoming, Clinton, Potter, McKean

Highway system
- Pennsylvania State Route System; Interstate; US; State; Scenic; Legislative
← PA 43	→ PA 45
← PA 341	→ PA 343
← PA 453	→ PA 456

Pennsylvania Route 44 (PA 44) is a 149.24 mi (240.18 km)-long state highway in the U.S. state of Pennsylvania. The route, which is signed north-south, is designated from Interstate 80 (I-80) and PA 42 in Buckhorn northwest to the New York state line near New York State Route 417 (NY 417) in Ceres Township.

Commissioned in 1927 by the Pennsylvania Department of Highways, PA 44 originally ran from the New York state line to Jersey Shore. Today, the highway is a scenic route from Columbia County to Potter County.

== Route description ==
=== Columbia and Montour counties ===
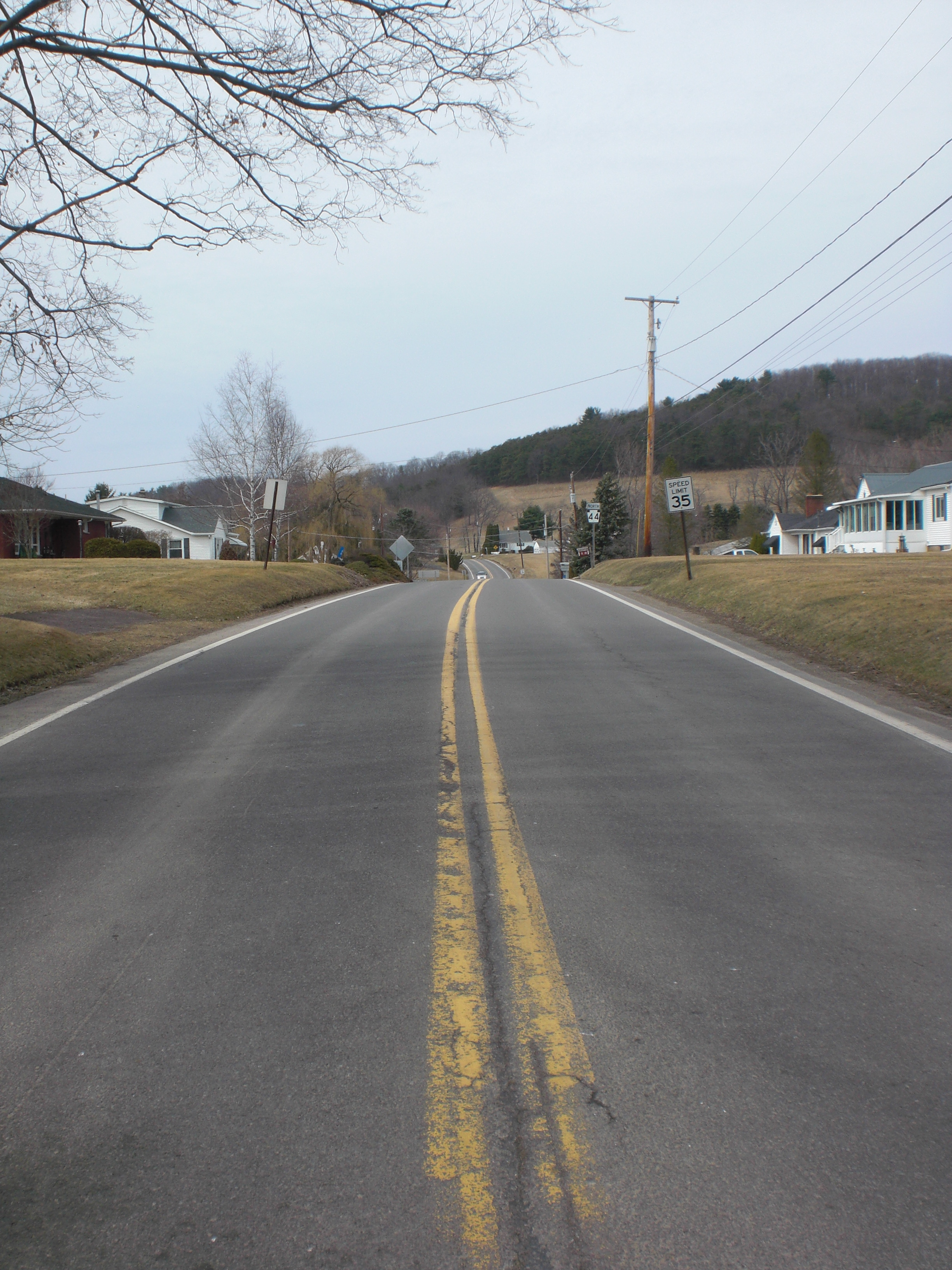
PA 44 northbound one kilometer from its southern terminus at PA 42 in Buckhorn

PA 44 begins in the census-designated place of Buckhorn in Hemlock Township, Columbia County, at an intersection with PA 42 and exit 232 of I-80. From here, the route heads northwest along two-lane undivided Buckhorn Road, passing businesses before running past homes in Buckhorn. The road continues through a mix of farmland and woodland with some homes through the Appalachians. PA 44 winds north and curves northwest to enter Madison Township, passing through more rural areas. The route runs through agricultural land with some woods and residences, turning west before heading back to the northwest, winding across a wooded ridge. PA 44 turns to the north and comes to an intersection with PA 642, at which point the two routes become concurrent along Danville Road. The road passes through farmland with some development and heads into the community of Jerseytown, where it passes homes and a few businesses and curves northwest to come to an intersection with PA 254. At this intersection, PA 642 ends and PA 44 continues northwest along White Hall Road, heading through agricultural areas with some woods and residences.

The route enters Anthony Township in Montour County, passing homes in the community of White Hall and running through agricultural and wooded areas in the Muncy Hills, turning to the west. The road continues west-southwest through farmland with some woodland and residences, passing through the community of Exchange. Farther west, PA 44 crosses into Limestone Township and reaches a junction with PA 54 near the community of Schuyler. At this point, PA 44 turns west for a concurrency with PA 54 on Continental Boulevard, passing through more rural areas.

=== Northumberland and Union counties ===
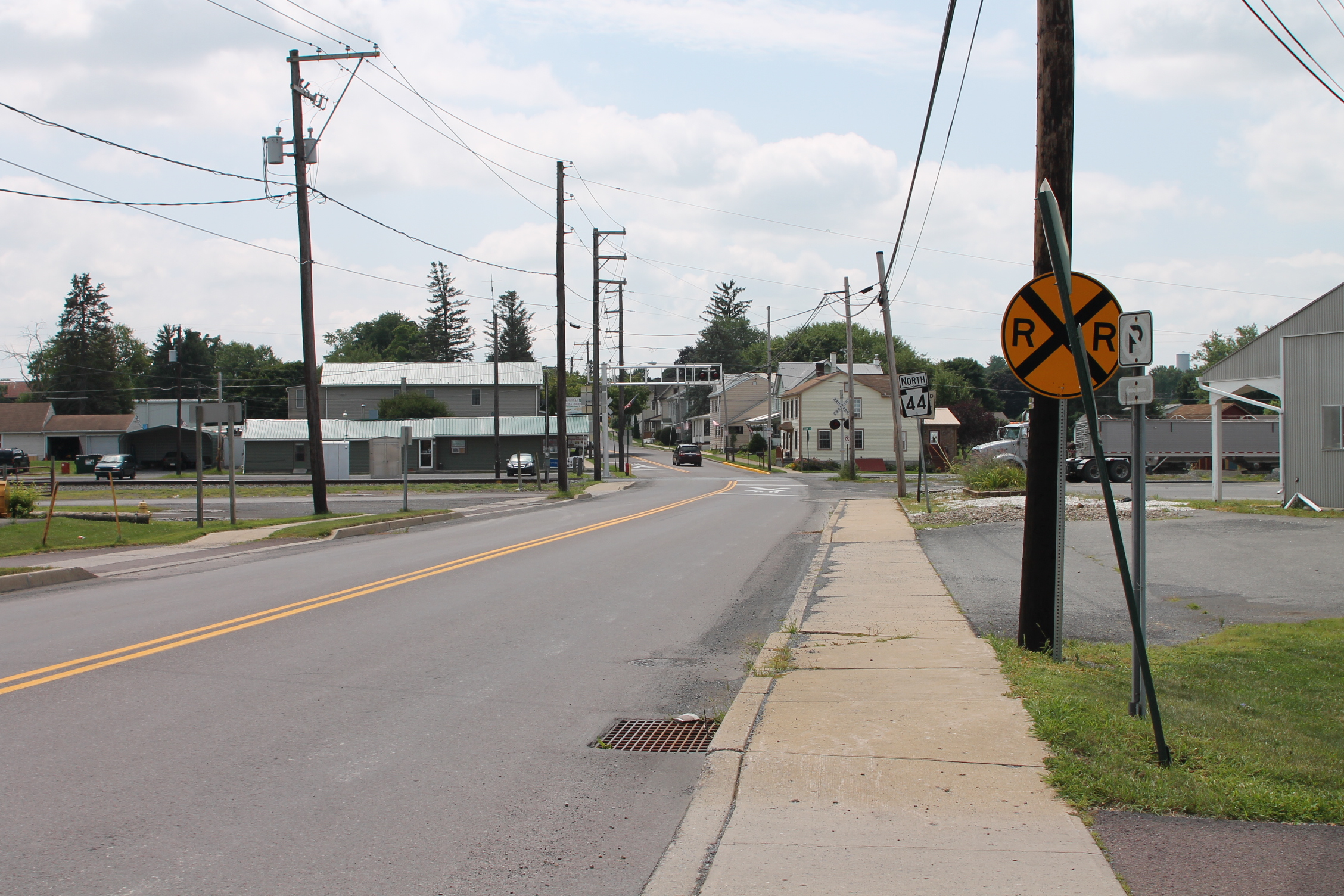
PA 44 north in Turbotville

PA 44/PA 54 enters Lewis Township in Northumberland County and becomes an unnamed road, running through farmland with some development. The road runs through a patch of woodland before it crosses into the borough of Turbotville, where it gains a center left-turn lane and passes businesses. PA 44 splits from PA 54 by turning south onto two-lane Main Street, crossing Norfolk Southern's Watsontown Secondary railroad line at-grade and heading into residential areas. The road curves to the southwest and continues past homes and a few businesses before it leaves Turbotville for Lewis Township again. Here, the route becomes an unnamed road that runs through agricultural areas with some woodland and development. PA 44 crosses into Delaware Township and continues through rural land before it enters the borough of McEwensville. Here, the route becomes Potash Street and runs west through residential areas of the borough, crossing the alignment of the Susquehanna Trail at Main Street. The road crosses back into Delaware Township and becomes unnamed again, passing farm fields before crossing under I-180 without an interchange. PA 44 runs west through a mix of farmland and woodland a short distance to the south of Warrior Run and the Watsontown Secondary tracks. The route curves northwest and crosses the creek and the railroad tracks at-grade in a wooded areas.

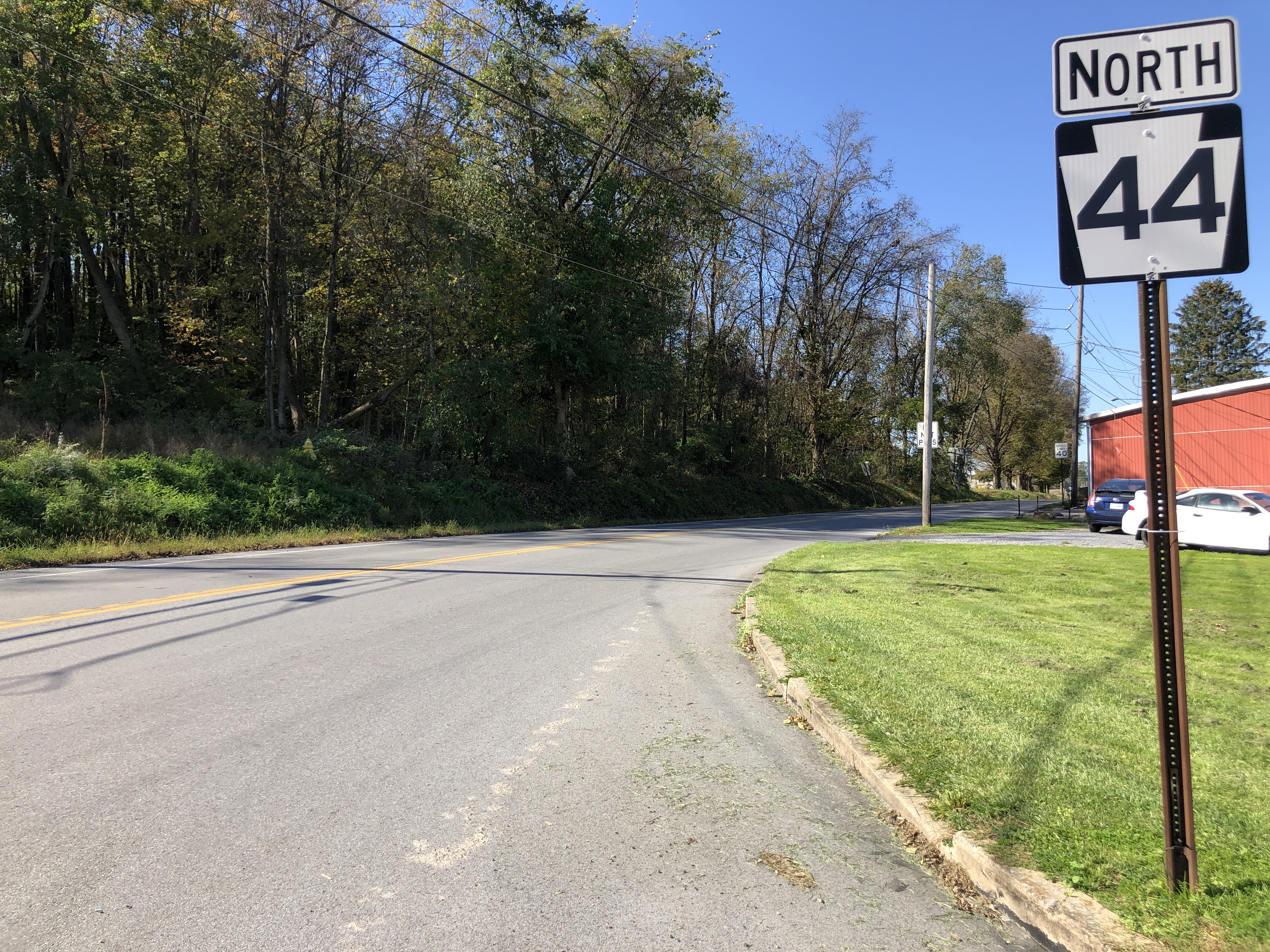
PA 44 northbound past US 15 in Gregg Township

PA 44 enters the borough of Watsontown and becomes McEwensville Road, passing homes and crossing Norfolk Southern's Buffalo Line at-grade prior to reaching an intersection with PA 405. Here, PA 44 joins PA 405 on Main Street, heading northwest past homes before running through the downtown area. The road passes through more residential areas before it becomes the border between Delaware Township to the west and Watsontown to the east. PA 44/PA 405 fully enters Delaware Township and continues north-northwest through farmland as an unnamed road. In the community of Dewart, the road passes businesses before PA 44 splits from PA 405 by turning to the west and passing farm fields. The road comes to a bridge over the West Branch Susquehanna River via Bridge Avenue; this is the former location of the historic Allenwood River Bridge, which was replaced by the current concrete structure in 1990. Upon crossing the river, PA 44 enters Gregg Township in Union County and heads west along Bridge Avenue, crossing the Union County Industrial Railroad at-grade and passing through residential areas in the community of Allenwood. The route intersects US 15 in a business area and turns to the west-northwest, becoming an unnamed road and running through agricultural areas to the north of the White Deer Hole Creek in the White Deer Valley. The road passes residential areas in the community of Spring Garden and continues through rural areas as it passes south of United States Penitentiary, Allenwood.

=== Lycoming and Clinton counties ===
PA 44 enters Washington Township in Lycoming County and continues west through agricultural areas in the White Deer Valley. In the residential community of Elimsport, the route turns to the north. PA 44 runs north-northeast through farmland and reaches an intersection with the southern terminus of PA 554, where PA 44 makes a turn to the west-northwest. The road runs through farm fields with some development before it enters a tract of the Tiadaghton State Forest and heads west to ascend North White Deer Ridge, one of the ridges on the Appalachian Mountain system. At the summit, the route crosses into Limestone Township and descends the ridge. PA 44 leaves the state forest and continues through wooded areas, turning to the northwest. The road passes through a mix of farm fields and woods before it runs through the residential community of Collomsville. The route comes to an intersection with the southern terminus of PA 654 and heads west through agricultural areas, passing homes in the community of Oval. PA 44 runs west through farmland with occasional residences before heading into woodland and turning to the north. The road crosses Antes Creek and curves northwest, reaching an intersection with the northern terminus of PA 880. The route and the creek head north through a gap in the forested Bald Eagle Mountain range, crossing into Nippenose Township. North of the gap, PA 44 runs near homes as it passes to the west of the community of Antes Fort and comes to a bridge over Norfolk Southern's Buffalo Line. The road runs north-northwest through farmland with some development before it turns west and crosses the West Branch Susquehanna River onto Long Island, where it passes farm fields before heading over more of the river.

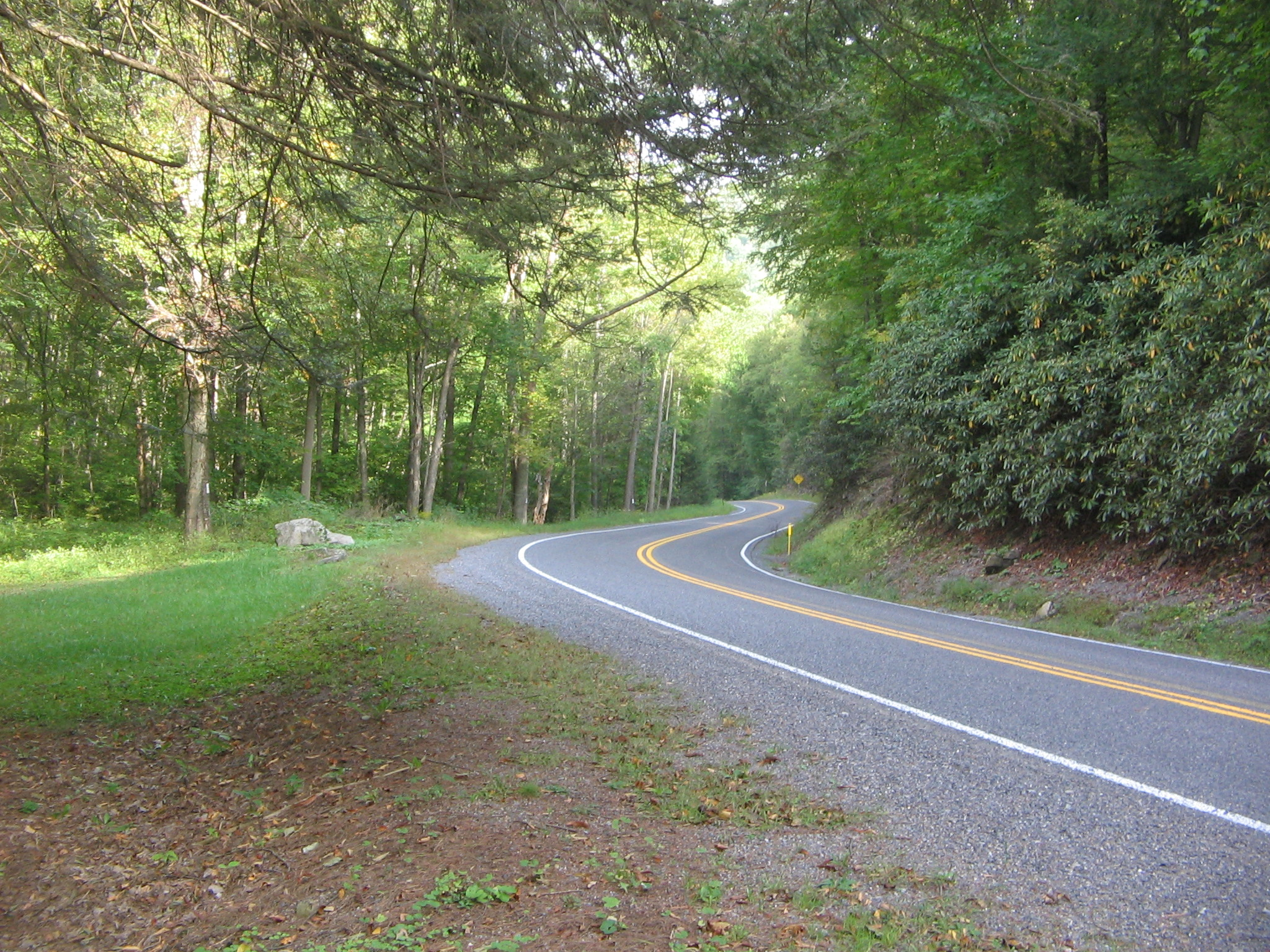
PA 44 in Cummings Township, as seen from Upper Pine Bottom State Park

After crossing the river, PA 44 enters the borough of Jersey Shore and becomes Allegheny Street, immediately turning north onto North Main Street. The route runs between residences and businesses to the west and the West Branch Susquehanna River to the east, leaving Jersey Shore for Porter Township. The road passes more development to the west of the river, heading north-northeast to a trumpet interchange with the US 220 freeway on the border between Porter Township to the west and Piatt Township to the east. At this point, PA 44 forms a wrong-way concurrency with US 220 on a four-lane freeway officially signed as the "Frank D. Oreilly Highway", heading west into Porter Township. The freeway heads through wooded areas to the north of Jersey Shore, coming to a bridge over the Lycoming Valley Railroad. US 220/PA 44 reach a diamond interchange with Thomas Street that serves Jersey Shore before continuing southwest near residential development, passing under the Pine Creek Rail Trail before coming to a bridge over Pine Creek. Upon crossing the creek, the freeway enters Pine Creek Township in Clinton County and PA 44 splits from the US 220 freeway at a diamond interchange by heading north onto a two-lane undivided road, passing a mix of farm fields and development.

The route crosses Pine Creek back into Porter Township in Lycoming County, heading northwest between farmland and the Pine Creek to the southwest and the Pine Creek Rail Trail and forested mountains to the northeast. The road crosses into Watson Township and crosses the trail. From here, the roadway winds north through forested areas with some residential development, with the creek and trail to the west. PA 44 comes to an intersection with the western terminus of PA 973 in the community of Tomb. The route, along with the Pine Creek and the Pine Creek Rail Trail, continue into the forested Pine Creek Gorge, winding north. The road enters the Tiadaghton State Forest and crosses into Cummings Township, turning west to pass through the community of Ramsey. PA 44 continues northwest through the gorge and crosses Little Pine Creek in the community of Waterville. The route heads west and crosses the Pine Creek Rail Trail and Pine Creek before it makes a turn to the north. PA 44 comes to an intersection with the western terminus of PA 414, which continues north through the Pine Creek Gorge. From here, PA 44 turns west and heads through dense forests within the Tiadaghton State Forest, passing Upper Pine Bottom State Park. The road continues northwest into McHenry Township and reaches a junction with the northern terminus of PA 664 in the community of Haneyville. At this point, PA 44 becomes Coudersport Pike and runs along the border between Gallagher Township, Clinton County, to the west and McHenry Township, Lycoming County, to the east. The route heads north through dense forests, turning to the northwest. The road bends back to the north and runs along the boundary of Grugan Township, Clinton County, to the west and McHenry Township, Lycoming County, to the east as it runs between the Sproul State Forest to the west and the Tiadaghton State Forest to the east. Farther north, PA 44 forms the border between Chapman Township, Clinton County, to the west and McHenry Township, Lycoming County, to the east. The route fully enters Brown Township in Lycoming County and continues north through the Tiadaghton State Forest as an unnamed road, passing through the community of Pump Station. The road runs through more of the state forest and makes a turn to the west.

=== Potter and McKean counties ===
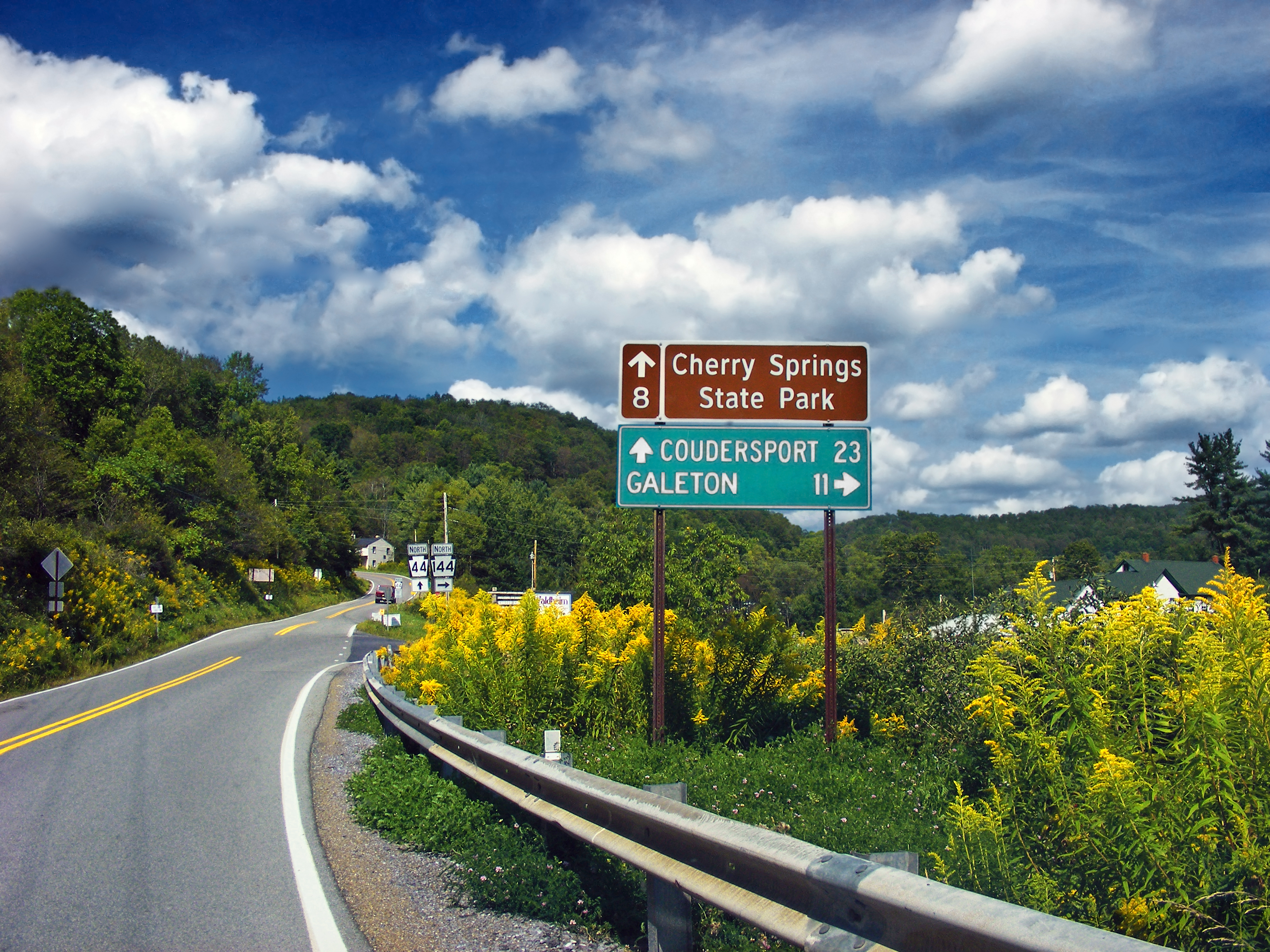
The intersection of PA 44 and PA 144 in Abbott Township

PA 44 enters Stewardson Township in Potter County and becomes Pine Hill Road, passing through more of the Tiadaghton State Forest before it turns northwest and runs through the Susquehannock State Forest. The road winds northwest before it reaches the summit of Pine Hill and curves to the west to descend the hill, coming to an intersection with PA 144 in the community of Oleona. At this point, PA 44 and PA 144 head north concurrent on Pine Hill Road, passing through more of the Susquehannock State Forest and entering Abbott Township. The road runs through forests to the east of Little Kettle Creek. Farther north, PA 44/PA 144 leaves the state forest and continues through more wooded areas to the community of Carter Camp, where PA 144 splits from PA 44 by heading east. From here, PA 44 becomes Cherry Springs Road and heads northwest through forested areas of mountains. The road heads back into the Susquehannock State Forest and traverses Mount Brodhead, crossing into West Branch Township. The route curves southwest and crosses back to Abbott Township. PA 44 makes a sharp turn to the northwest and reenters West Branch Township, where it passes through Cherry Springs State Park before heading through the community of Cherry Springs. The road leaves the state forest as it runs through forested areas with a few homes, entering Summit Township. The route crosses back into the Susquehannock State Forest and winds northwest through more hills and mountains. PA 44 turns north and passes Patterson State Park. The road bends to the west and heads out of the state forest as it winds northwest through more rugged woodland, traversing Kaple Hill and Cochran Hill. The route runs to the west of Mill Creek and heads north through wooded areas with some farm fields and residences. PA 44 heads into Sweden Township and continues through a mix of fields and woods with some homes and commercial development, crossing the creek. In the community of Sweden Valley, the route comes to an intersection with US 6. PA 44 is named Highway to the Stars from the border between Lycoming and Potter counties north to US 6 as it passes through Cherry Springs State Park, an International Dark Sky Park that is popular among astronomers and stargazers.

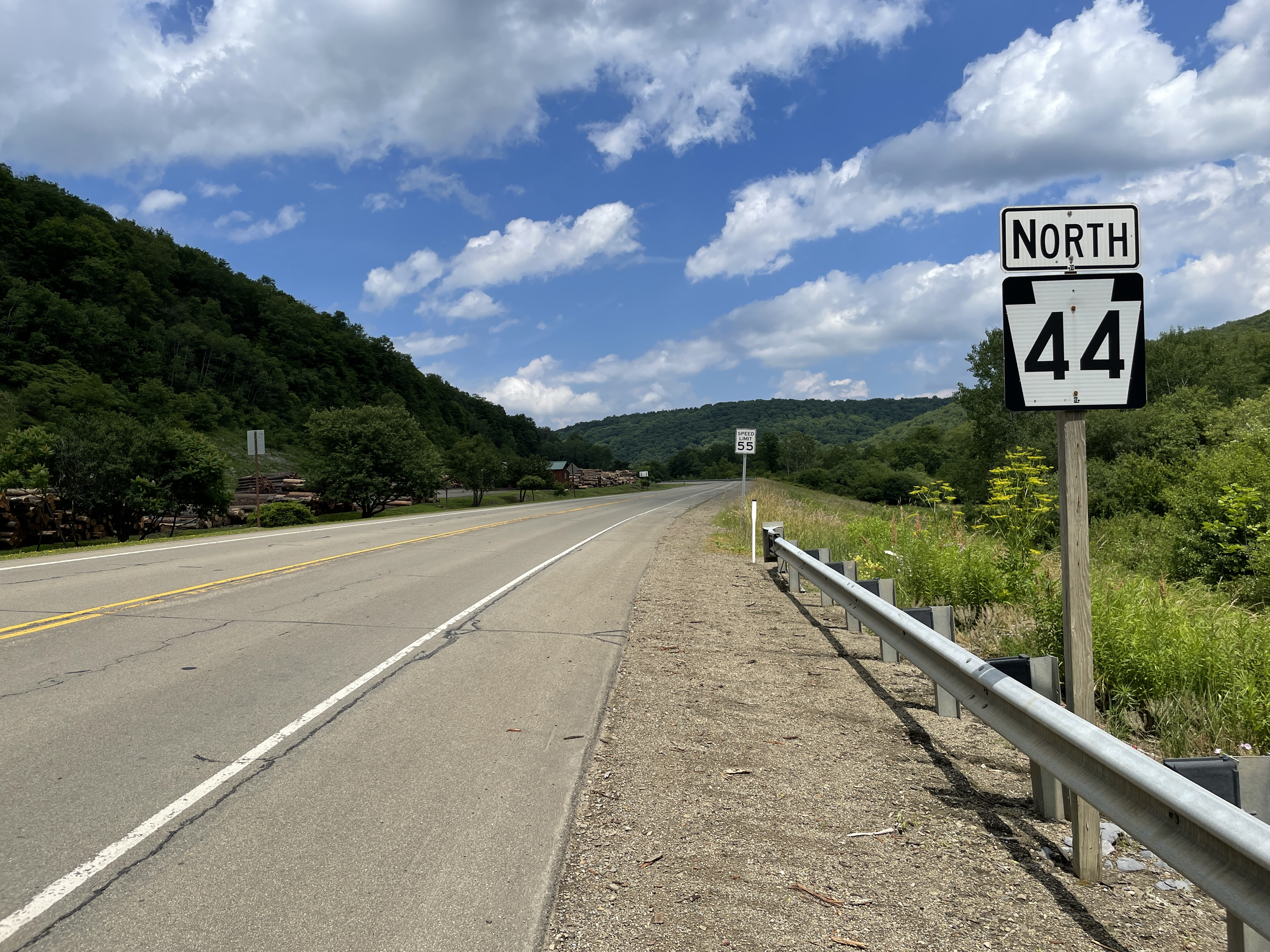
PA 44 northbound leaving Coudersport

At this point, PA 44 turns west for a concurrency with US 6 on the Grand Army of the Republic Highway. The two routes head northwest through wooded areas with some fields and residential and commercial development to the north of Mill Creek, crossing into Eulalia Township. The road continues northwest and enters the borough of Coudersport as it passes to the south of UPMC Cole hospital. US 6/PA 44 becomes East 2nd Street and reaches an intersection with the northern terminus of PA 872, continuing west through forests and development. Farther west, the road heads into residential areas with some businesses and passes to the north of Coudersport Area Junior/Senior High School. US 6/PA 44 crosses the Allegheny River and heads into the downtown area of Coudersport, passing to the south of the Potter County Courthouse. Upon reaching North Main Street, the two routes split, with US 6 turning to the south and PA 44 turning to the north. PA 44 follows North Main Street past downtown businesses before it heads past homes, curving to the north-northeast. The route continues between forests to the west and residential areas and the Allegheny River to the east before it leaves Coudersport for Eulalia Township, becoming an unnamed road. The road runs through a mix of farm fields and woods with some homes, curving to the northeast. PA 44 comes to a junction with the western terminus of PA 49, where PA 44 turns north and the road continues east as PA 49.

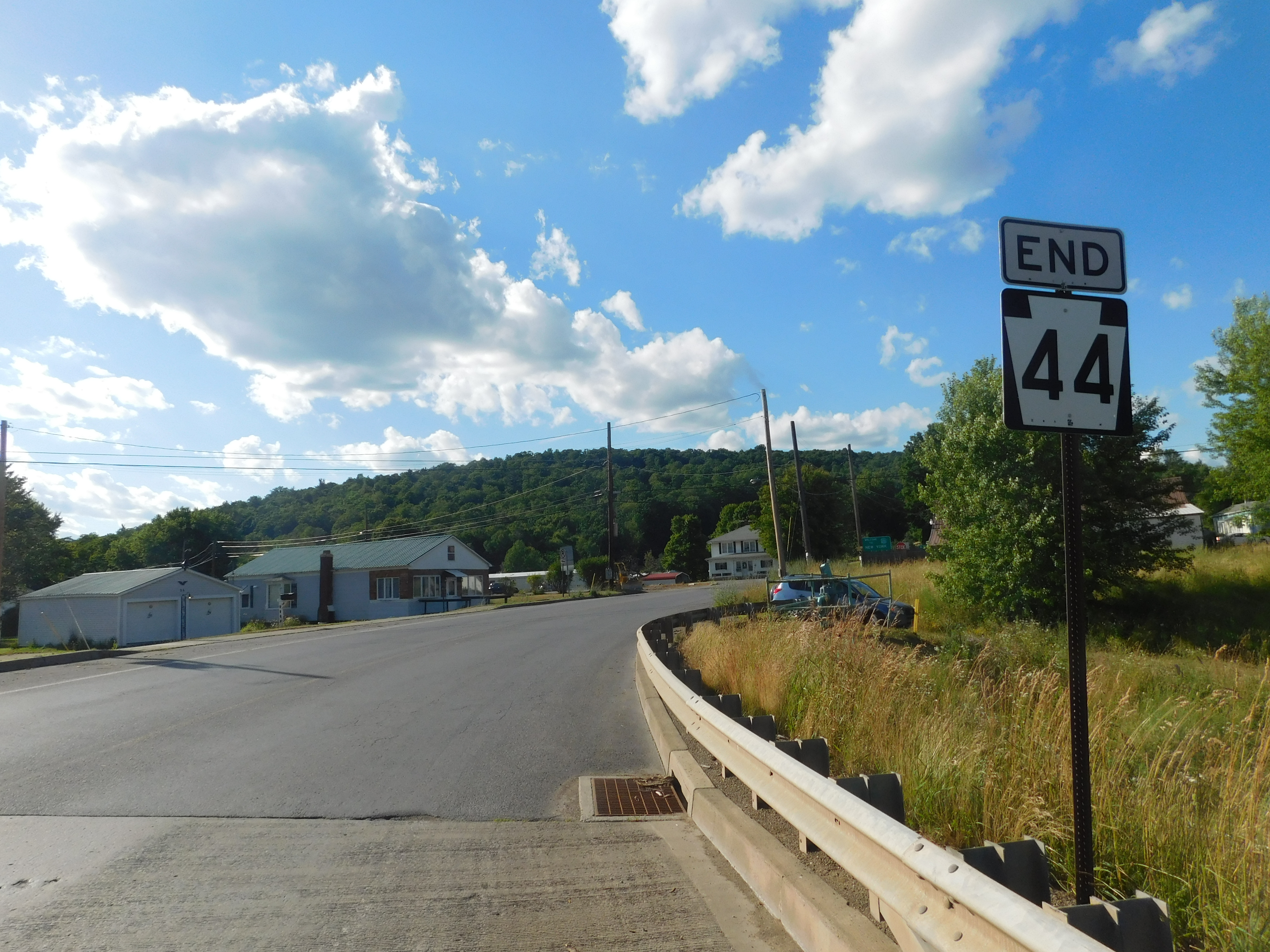
PA 44 northbound approaching its end at the New York border in Ceres

PA 44 runs through hilly areas with a mix of fields and woods, crossing into Hebron Township. The road winds north through rural areas, passing east of Greenman Hill. The route turns northwest and passes through the community of Hebron Center, continuing through wooded areas with some farm fields and residences. PA 44 reaches an intersection with the western terminus of PA 244 in the community of Coneville and turns to the west, heading to the south of Oswayo Creek. The road continues through rural areas alongside the creek and passes through the northeast corner of Clara Township before it enters Sharon Township. The route crosses the Oswayo Creek and heads through the community of Millport as it runs through more fields and woods with some development, passing through Sharon Center. PA 44 continues northwest and enters the borough of Shinglehouse, where the name becomes South Stevens Street and it runs through residential areas with some businesses, passing to the northeast of Oswayo Valley High School. The route curves north before it turns west onto Academy Street, heading past homes before passing businesses in the center of Shinglehouse and bending southwest. PA 44 heads into residential areas, turning northwest onto Oswayo Street and west-southwest onto Ceres Street. The road crosses Oswayo Creek and makes a curve to the northwest. The route enters Ceres Township in McKean County and becomes Ceres Road, heading northwest through fields and development before running through wooded areas, with the creek to the northeast. The road continues through a mix of farm fields and wooded areas with some development, passing through the community of Myrtle. Farther northwest, PA 44 reaches the community of Ceres and crosses the Oswayo Creek before coming to its northern terminus at the New York border. From here, the road continues north for less than 100 yards (91 m) to a T-intersection with NY 417.

== History ==
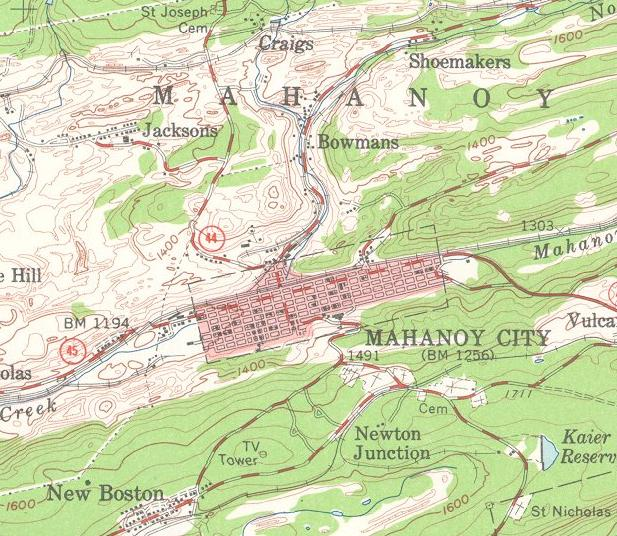
The former eastern segment of PA 44 that once was routed to Mahanoy City

When PA 44 was commissioned in 1927, the route was designated from US 220 in Jersey Shore to the New York-Pennsylvania border. Northwest of Coudersport from PA 49 to PA 244, and from US 6 to US 220, the road was not paved. From Jersey Shore to Turbotville, PA 44 was assigned the PA 54 designation. From Turbotville to Jerseytown, the road was designated as PA 454. From Jerseytown to Buckhorn, PA 44 was numbered as PA 342. These designations were eliminated with an extension of PA 44 in 1941.

By 1940, PA 44 was extended east to Turbotville, replacing the previous PA 54 alignment. Also in the 1940s, PA 44 was completely paved from Coudersport to the New York state line. In the 1950s, PA 44 was largely extended to Mahanoy City in Schuylkill County.

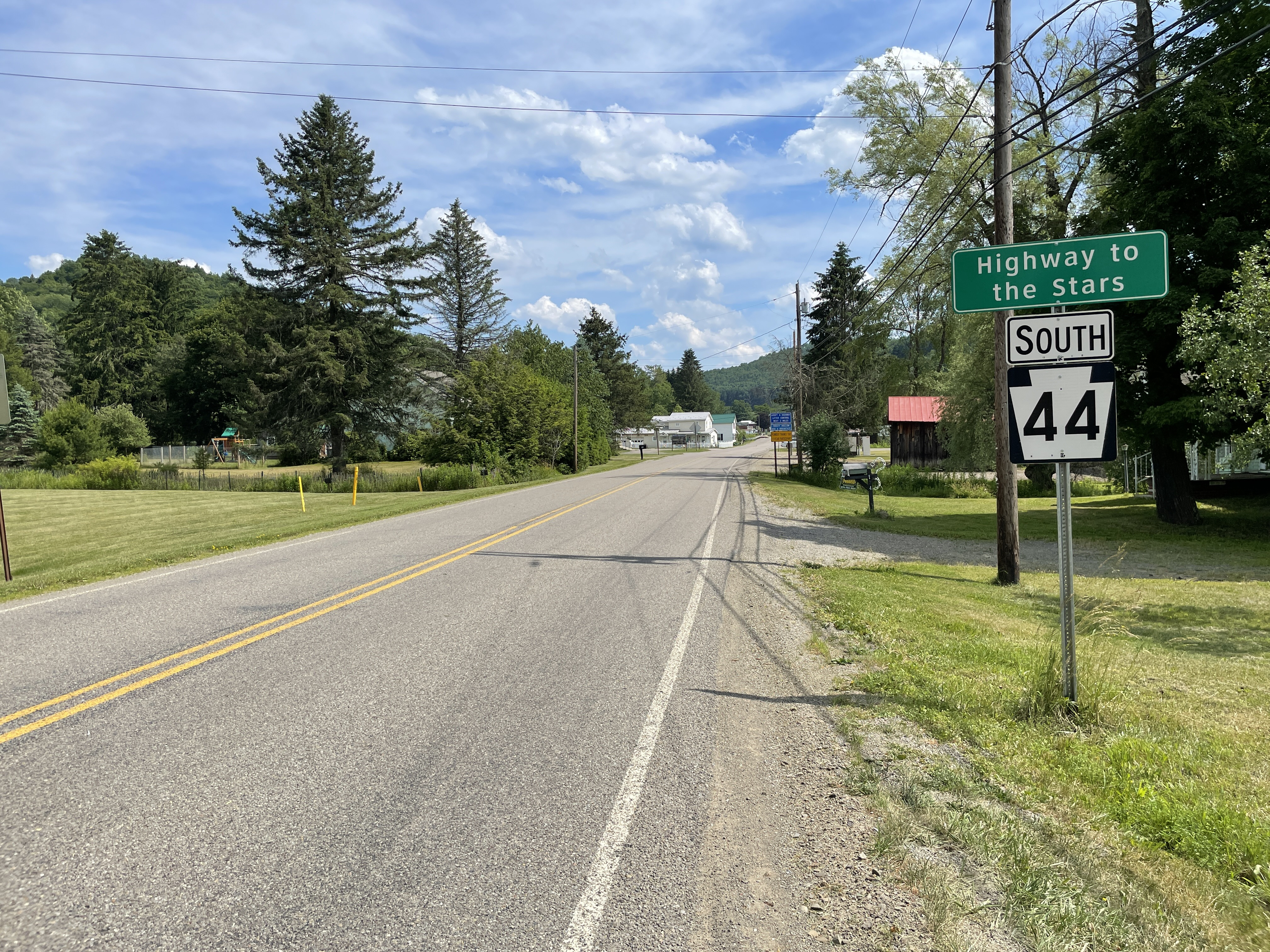
PA 44 southbound past US 6 in Sweden Valley

By 1970, the road was truncated to its current southern terminus in Buckhorn.

On June 28, 2018, Governor Tom Wolf approved legislation that named the section of PA 44 in Potter County between the Lycoming County line and US 6 as Highway to the Stars, as it passes through Cherry Springs State Park. The idea for the name came from photographer Curt Weinhold, a Potter County resident. State Representative Martin Causer sponsored the legislation for naming the section of PA 44 as Highway to the Stars.

== Major intersections ==
County	Location	mi	km	Destinations	Notes
Columbia	Hemlock Township	0.00	0.00	PA 42 to I-80 – Millville, Catawissa	Exit 232 (I-80)
Columbia	Madison Township	6.75	10.86	PA 642 west (Danville Road) – Danville	Southern terminus of concurrency.
Columbia	Madison Township	7.83	12.60	PA 254 (Washingtonville Road/Jerseytown Road) – Washingtonville, Millville PA 642 ends	Northern terminus of concurrency. Eastern terminus of PA 642.
Montour	Limestone Township	16.11	25.93	PA 54 east (Continental Boulevard) – Danville	Southern terminus of concurrency.
Northumberland	Turbotville	18.61	29.95	PA 54 west – Montgomery	Northern terminus of concurrency.
Northumberland	Watsontown	24.64	39.65	PA 405 south (Dickson Avenue) – Milton	Southern terminus of concurrency.
Northumberland	Delaware Township	26.92	43.32	PA 405 north – Montgomery	Northern terminus of concurrency
Union	Gregg Township	27.90	44.90	US 15 – Lewisburg, Williamsport	
Lycoming	Washington Township	35.44	57.04	PA 554 north – Williamsport	Southern terminus of PA 554
Lycoming	Limestone Township	43.12	69.39	PA 654 east – Williamsport	Western terminus of PA 654
Lycoming	Limestone Township	47.03	75.69	PA 880 south to I-80	Northern terminus of PA 880
Lycoming	Piatt–Porter township line	51.49	82.87	South end of freeway	
Lycoming	Piatt–Porter township line	51.49	82.87	Future I-99 north / US 220 north – Williamsport	Southern terminus of concurrency
Lycoming	Porter Township–Jersey Shore line			Thomas Street	
Clinton	Pine Creek Township	54.16	87.16	Future I-99 south / US 220 south – Lock Haven	Northern terminus of concurrency, Exit 120 (US 220)
Clinton	Pine Creek Township	54.16	87.16	North end of freeway	
Lycoming	Watson Township	59.22	95.31	PA 973 east – Salladasburg	Western terminus of PA 973
Lycoming	Cummings Township	66.72	107.38	PA 414 east – Jersey Mills, Morris	Waterville, Western terminus of PA 414
Lycoming–Clinton county line	McHenry–Gallagher township line	72.04	115.94	PA 664 south (Coudersport Pike) – Lock Haven	Northern terminus of PA 664
Potter	Stewardson Township	96.26	154.92	PA 144 south – Cross Fork, Renovo	Southern terminus of concurrency
Potter	Abbott Township	101.59	163.49	PA 144 north – Galeton	Northern terminus of concurrency
Potter	Sweden Township	120.31	193.62	US 6 east (Grand Army of the Republic Highway) – Galeton, Wellsboro	Southern terminus of concurrency
Potter	Coudersport	122.44	197.05	PA 872 south (Buffalo Street) – Austin	Northern terminus of PA 872
Potter	Coudersport	124.40	200.20	US 6 west (Main Street) – Port Allegany, Smethport	Northern terminus of concurrency
Potter	Eulalia Township	127.45	205.11	PA 49 east – Lawrenceville	Western terminus of PA 49
Potter	Hebron Township	136.07	218.98	PA 244 east – Oswayo, Genesee	Western terminus of PA 244
McKean	Ceres Township	149.24	240.18	NY 417 – Olean, Bolivar	New York state line
1.000 mi = 1.609 km; 1.000 km = 0.621 mi: Concurrency terminus
