= Gallagher Township, Pennsylvania =

Township in Pennsylvania, US

Coordinates: 41°14′00″N 77°21′59″W

- Township
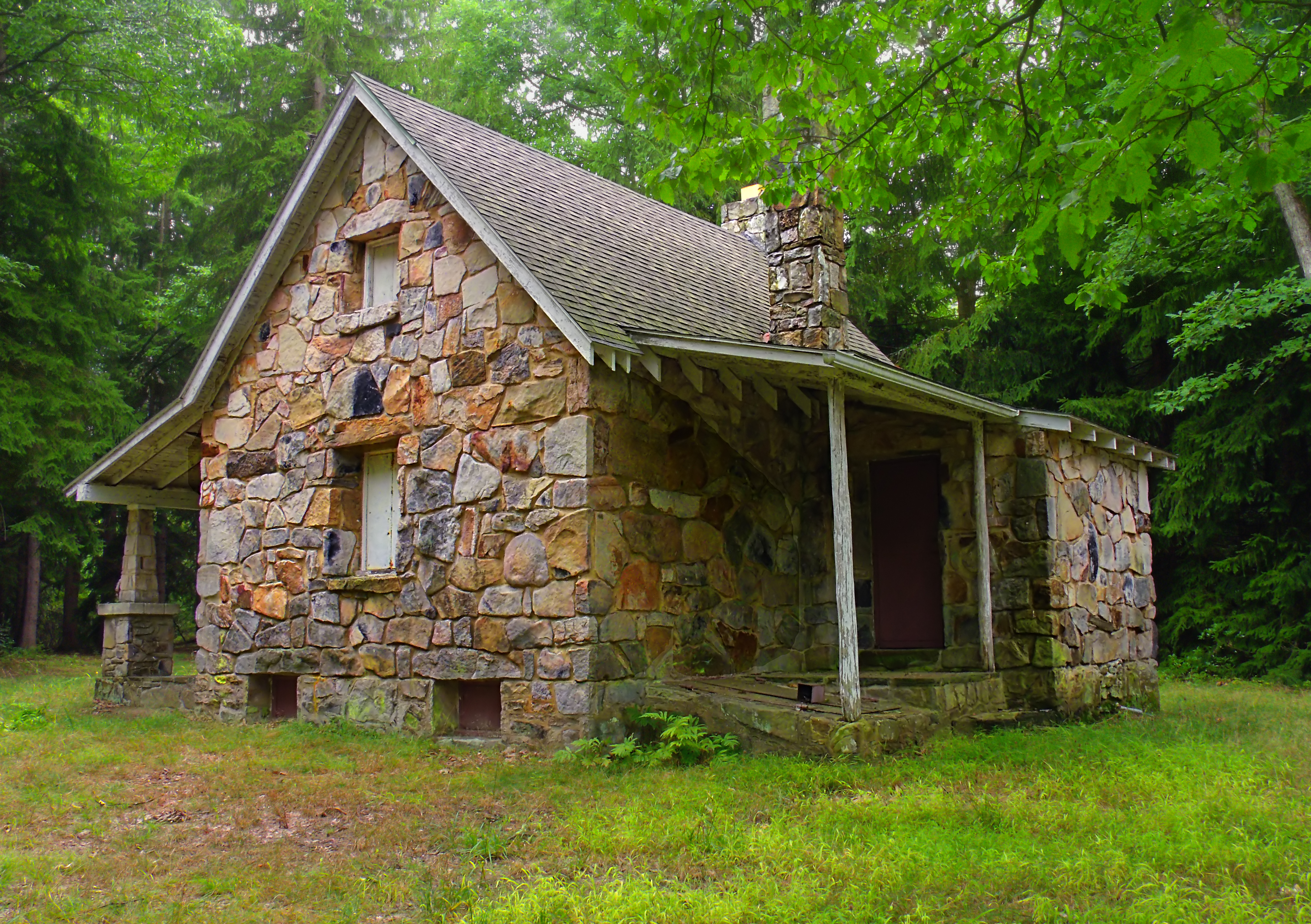
- Whetham Cabin within the West Branch Research and Demonstration Forest in the township

- Logo

- Location in Clinton County and the state of Pennsylvania.
- Country: United States
- State: Pennsylvania
- County: Clinton
- Settled: 1835
- Incorporated: 1849

Area
  - Total: 53.73 sq mi (139.17 km^{2})
  - Land: 53.71 sq mi (139.12 km^{2})
  - Water: 0.019 sq mi (0.05 km^{2})

Population (2020)
  - Total: 386 ▲
  - Estimate (2021): 387
  - Density: 7.2/sq mi (2.77/km^{2})
- ZIP code: 17745
- Area codes: 272 and 570
- FIPS code: 42-035-28296
- Website: gallaghertownshippa.org

Gallagher Township is a township in Clinton County, Pennsylvania, United States. The population was 386 at the 2020 census.

== Geography ==
The township is in eastern Clinton County and is bordered to the northeast by Lycoming County. The northern third of the township-county boundary is formed by Pennsylvania Route 44, while the middle third of the boundary follows Pennsylvania Route 664. The highways intersect at the unincorporated community of Haneyville, which straddles the county line.

According to the United States Census Bureau, the township has a total area of 53.7 square miles (139.2 km^{2}), of which 0.019 square miles (0.05 km^{2}), or 0.04%, is water. Sproul State Forest occupies portions of the western side of the township.

== Demographics ==
Historical population
Census	Pop.	Note	%±
1980	194		—
1990	213		9.8%
2000	340		59.6%
2010	381		12.1%
2020	386		1.3%
2021 (est.)	387		0.3%

As of the census of 2000, there were 340 people, 134 households, and 110 families residing in the township. The population density was 6.3 people per square mile (2.5/km^{2}). There were 328 housing units at an average density of 6.1/sq mi (2.4/km^{2}). The racial makeup of the township was 99.71% White, and 0.29% from two or more races. Hispanic or Latino of any race were 0.29% of the population.

There were 134 households, out of which 26.1% had children under the age of 18 living with them, 71.6% were married couples living together, 2.2% had a female householder with no husband present, and 17.9% were non-families. 14.2% of all households were made up of individuals, and 3.0% had someone living alone who was 65 years of age or older. The average household size was 2.54 and the average family size was 2.75.

In the township the population was spread out, with 20.3% under the age of 18, 4.7% from 18 to 24, 31.2% from 25 to 44, 32.6% from 45 to 64, and 11.2% who were 65 years of age or older. The median age was 42 years. For every 100 females, there were 109.9 males. For every 100 females age 18 and over, there were 122.1 males.

The median income for a household in the township was $39,531, and the median income for a family was $45,000. Males had a median income of $35,833 versus $16,250 for females. The per capita income for the township was $18,638. About 4.1% of families and 6.9% of the population were below the poverty line, including 4.3% of those under age 18 and 9.7% of those age 65 or over.
