= Nisbet, Pennsylvania =

Unincorporated community in Pennsylvania, US

- Unincorporated community
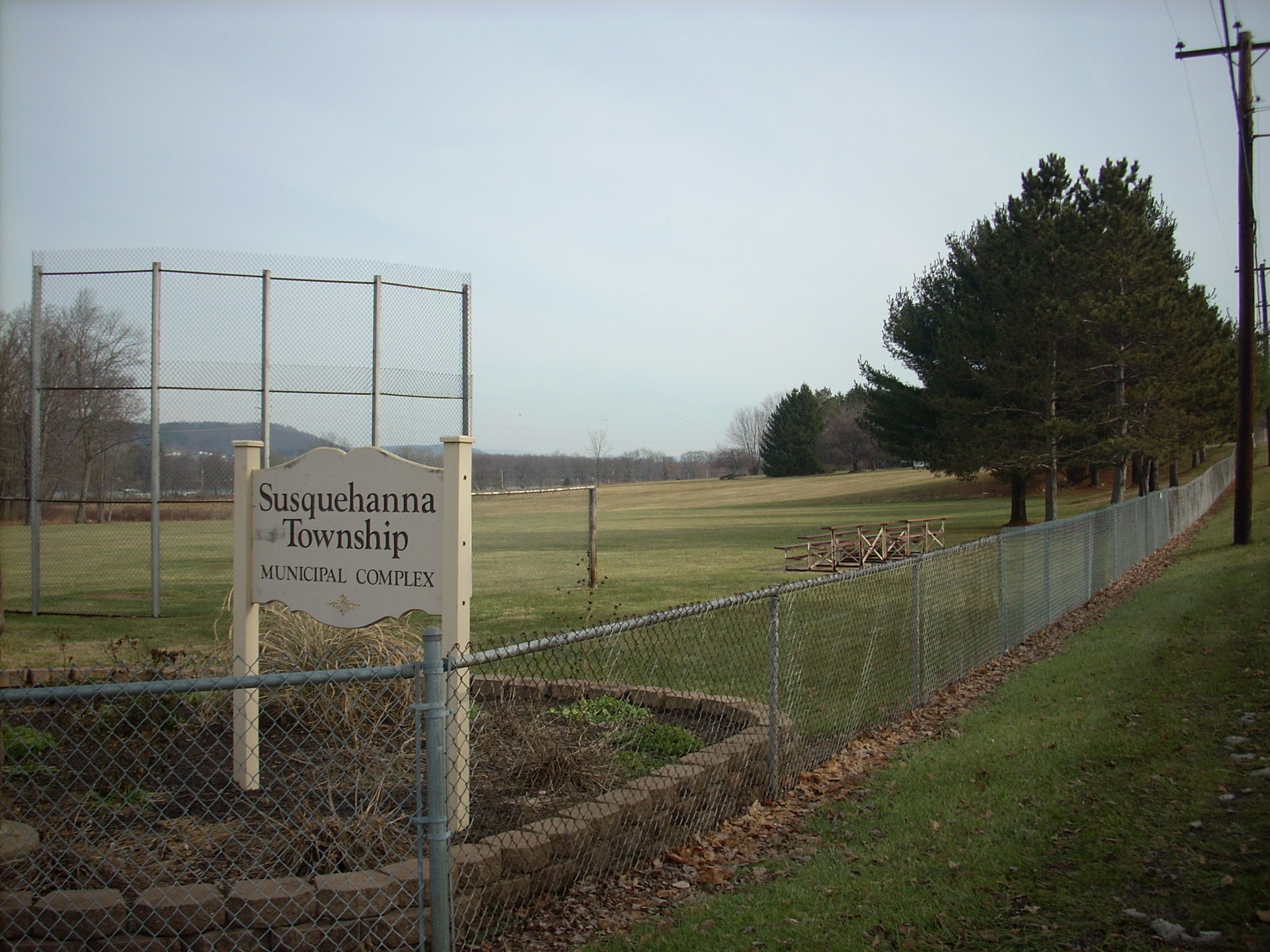
- Nisbet Park

- Location within Pennsylvania Location within the United States
- Coordinates: 41°13′05″N 77°06′48″W
- Country: United States
- State: Pennsylvania
- County: Lycoming
- Township: Susquehanna
- Elevation: 564 ft (172 m)
- Time zone: UTC-5 (Eastern (EST))
  - Summer (DST): UTC-4 (EDT)
- Area code: 570
- GNIS feature ID: 1182477

Nisbet is an unincorporated community in Susquehanna Township, Lycoming County, Pennsylvania, United States.

It was named for John Nisbet, an early settler of Williamsport, who applied for a tract of land in 1769.
