= Susquehanna Township, Lycoming County, Pennsylvania =

Township in Pennsylvania, US

- Township
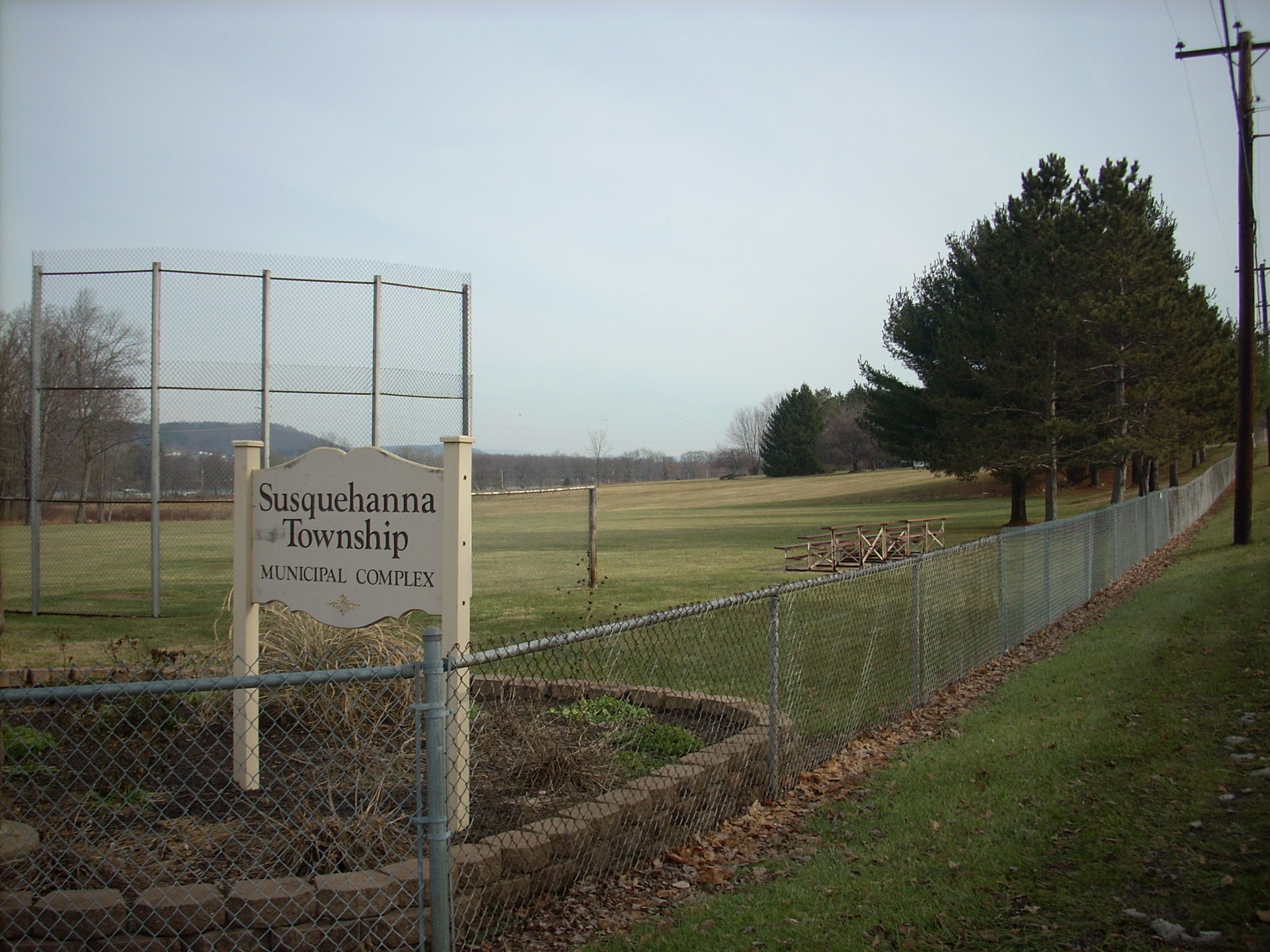
- Township municipal complex in Nisbet

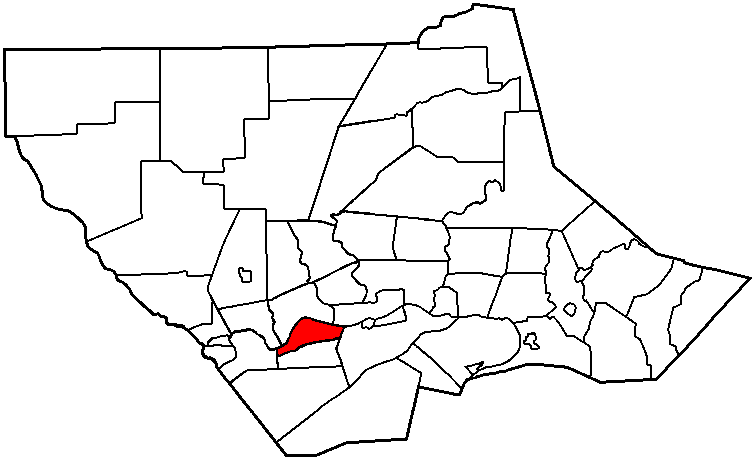
- Map of Lycoming County, Pennsylvania highlighting Susquehanna Township

- Map of Lycoming County, Pennsylvania
- Coordinates: 41°12′52″N 77°7′0″W
- Country: United States
- State: Pennsylvania
- County: Lycoming
- Settled: 1801
- Incorporated: 1838

Area
  - Total: 7.18 sq mi (18.59 km^{2})
  - Land: 6.57 sq mi (17.01 km^{2})
  - Water: 0.61 sq mi (1.59 km^{2})
- Elevation: 801 ft (244 m)

Population (2020)
  - Total: 972 ▼
  - Estimate (2021): 966
  - Density: 149.7/sq mi (57.79/km^{2})
- Time zone: UTC-5 (Eastern (EST))
  - Summer (DST): UTC-4 (EDT)
- FIPS code: 42-081-75544
- GNIS feature ID: 1216773
- Website: susquehannatwp.org

Susquehanna Township is a township in Lycoming County, Pennsylvania, United States. The population was 972 at the 2020 census. It is part of the Williamsport Metropolitan Statistical Area.

== History ==
Susquehanna Township was established during the December 1838 sessions of the Pennsylvania General Assembly. It was formed from parts of Nippenose and Armstrong townships.

Susquehanna Township was first surveyed in 1769. The surveyors named it "Upper Bottom" to distinguish it from a piece of land further to the east that was named "Lower Bottom", present-day Duboistown and South Williamsport. The first settlers arrived in 1801 and cleared the alluvial plain near the West Branch Susquehanna River and began farming. The village of Nisbet, a collection of about a dozen homes, rose up around the railroad station of the same name. Two grist mills and a small textile mill were built on Mill Run during the early days of Susquehanna Township.

Susquehanna Township has grown somewhat since it was founded. The village of Nisbet underwent an expansion during the 1950s and 1960s and now serves as a bedroom community for Williamsport and Jersey Shore. Much of the land on the alluvial plain is still farmed. Farmers rent out small portions of their property for the docking of recreational boats on the West Branch Susquehanna River. The township is protected by Station 7, the Nisbet Volunteer Fire Company.

== Geography ==
Susquehanna Township is in southwestern Lycoming County and is bordered by the West Branch Susquehanna River to the north, Armstrong Township to the east, Bastress Township to the south and Nippenose Township to the west. Across the West Branch, Woodward Township is to the north and the city of Williamsport is to the northeast. There is no road crossing the river from Susquehanna Township, however; the nearest crossings are in Duboistown to the east and at Jersey Shore to the west.

The ridgecrest of Bald Eagle Mountain forms the southern border of the township. The mountain is cut by two water gaps along the township border: Big Run cuts through the mountain near the western end of the border, and Bender Run cuts through to the east, flowing north through Nisbet. Both streams run north to the West Branch of the Susquehanna.

According to the United States Census Bureau, the township has a total area of 7.2 square miles (18.6 km^{2}), of which 6.6 square miles (17.0 km^{2}) are land and 0.62 square miles (1.6 km^{2}), or 8.53%, are water.

== Demographics ==
Historical population
Census	Pop.	Note	%±
2010	1,000		—
2020	972		−2.8%
2021 (est.)	966		−0.6%
U.S. Decennial Census

As of the census of 2000, there were 993 people, 400 households, and 312 families residing in the township. The population density was 139.5 inhabitants per square mile (53.9/km^{2}). There were 431 housing units at an average density of 60.5 per square mile (23.4/km^{2}). The racial makeup of the township was 99.09% White, 0.10% African American, 0.20% Native American, and 0.60% from two or more races. Hispanic or Latino of any race were 0.40% of the population.

There were 400 households, out of which 27.3% had children under the age of 18 living with them, 67.5% were married couples living together, 6.3% had a female householder with no husband present, and 22.0% were non-families. 18.3% of all households were made up of individuals, and 7.5% had someone living alone who was 65 years of age or older. The average household size was 2.48 and the average family size was 2.82.

In the township the population was spread out, with 19.9% under the age of 18, 7.9% from 18 to 24, 26.8% from 25 to 44, 28.6% from 45 to 64, and 16.8% who were 65 years of age or older. The median age was 42 years. For every 100 females there were 93.6 males. For every 100 females age 18 and over, there were 96.8 males.

The median income for a household in the township was $36,806, and the median income for a family was $43,229. Males had a median income of $31,250 versus $22,446 for females. The per capita income for the township was $20,456. About 5.1% of families and 6.4% of the population were below the poverty line, including 8.0% of those under age 18 and 2.2% of those age 65 or over.
