= Antes Fort, Pennsylvania =

Unincorporated community in Pennsylvania, US

- Unincorporated community
- Location within Pennsylvania Location within the United States
- Coordinates: 41°11′30″N 77°13′26″W
- Country: United States
- State: Pennsylvania
- County: Lycoming
- Township: Nippenose
- Elevation: 587 ft (179 m)
- Time zone: UTC-5 (Eastern (EST))
  - Summer (DST): UTC-4 (EDT)
- ZIP code: 17720
- Area codes: 272 & 570
- GNIS feature ID: 1192073

Antes Fort is an unincorporated community in Lycoming County, Pennsylvania, United States. The community is located along Pennsylvania Route 44, 2.2 miles (3.5 km) east-southeast of Jersey Shore. Antes Fort has a post office with ZIP code 17720.
