= Rauchtown Run =

Tributary in Pennsylvania, U.S.

Coordinates: 41°11′20″N 77°14′28″W

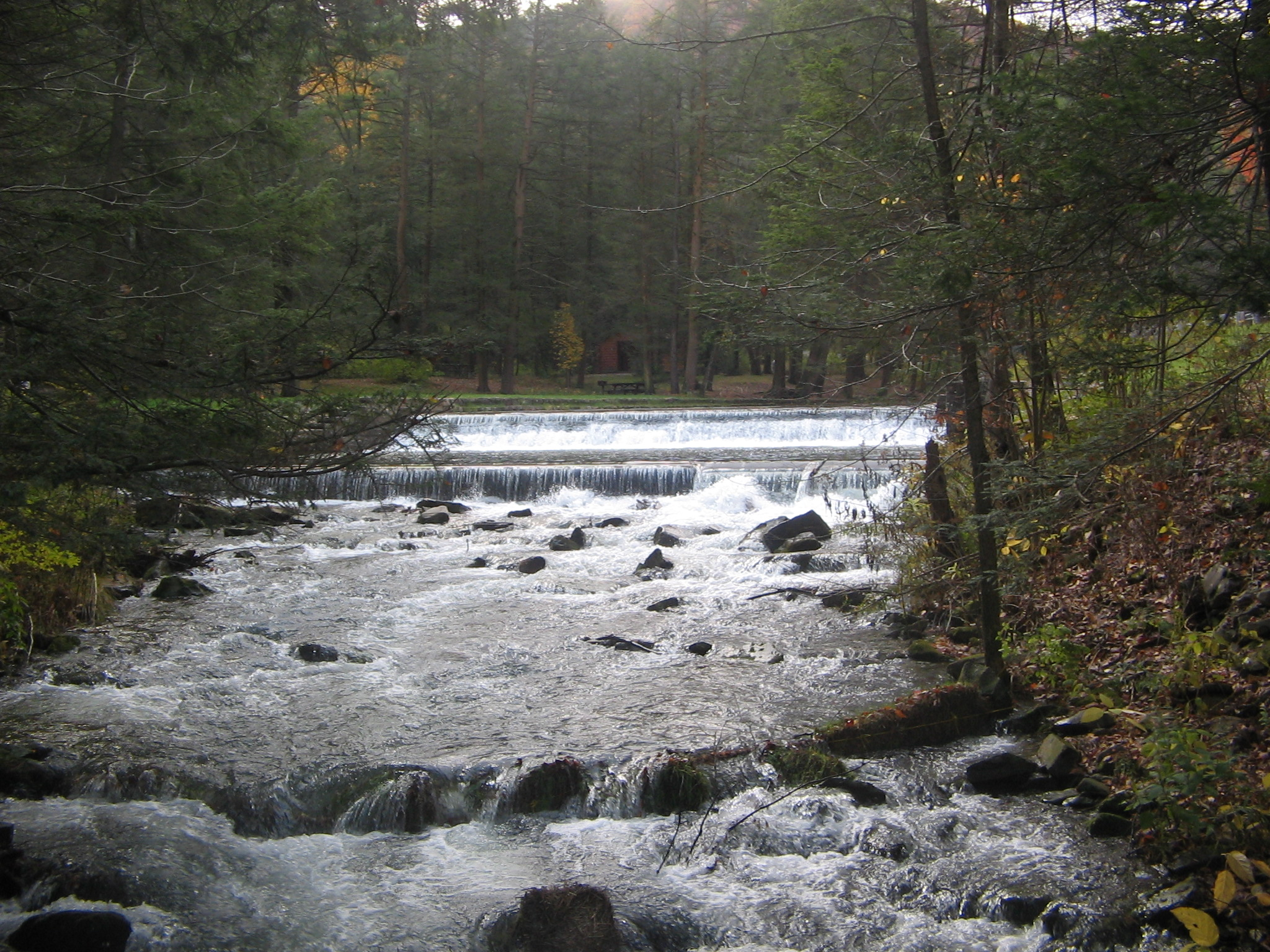
Rauchtown Run in Ravensburg State Park

Rauchtown Run, named Rauchtown Creek on United States Geological Survey maps, is a tributary of the West Branch Susquehanna River in Clinton and Lycoming Counties, Pennsylvania, in the United States.

== History and geography ==
Rauchtown Run flows through the eastern portions of Clinton County and into the southwestern corner of Lycoming County where it sinks underground in Limestone Township and joins Antes Creek at the village of Oriole.

Beginning in Bastress Township, Antes Creek sinks underground at the village of Collomsville, picking up McMurrin Run and Rattling Camp Run while underneath the surface. After receiving Rauchtown Run at Oriole, it emerges above ground at Lochabar Springs (also known as Nippenose Spring or Nippino Spring) in Limestone Township before joining the West Branch Susquehanna River near Jersey Shore. Antes Creek was historically known as Nippenose Creek.

Nippenose is likely derived from a Lenape term "Nipeno-wi", meaning "like the summer." The name "Antes Creek" honors Lt Colonel John Henry Ante, after whom nearby Fort Antes was also named. Other variant names include: Sunken Creek, Antis Creek and Rauch Creek.

The total length of Rauchtown Run and Antes Creek is 9.4 miles (15.1 km).

== See also ==
- List of rivers of Pennsylvania
