= List of municipalities in Lycoming County, Pennsylvania =

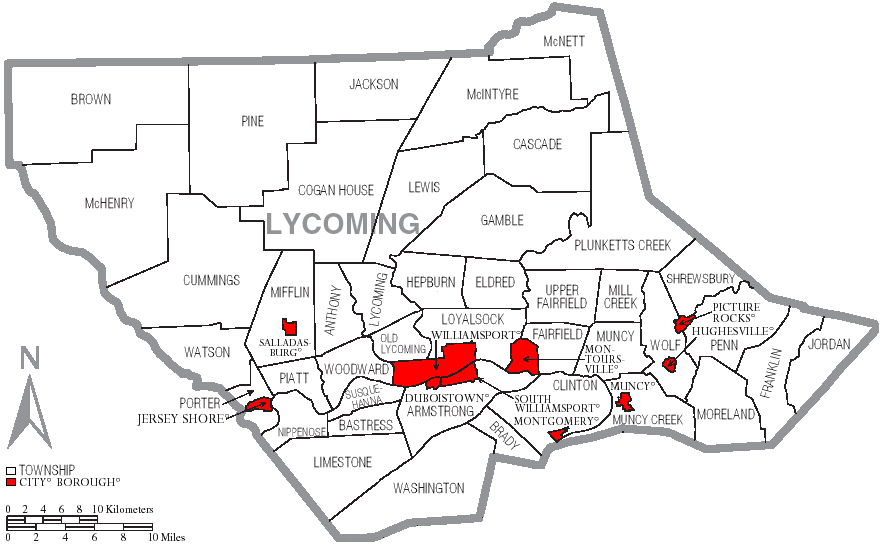
Map of Lycoming County, Pennsylvania with municipal labels showing cities and boroughs (red) and townships (white)

There are 52 municipalities in Lycoming County, Pennsylvania. Under Pennsylvania law, counties have three main types of incorporated municipalities, of which Lycoming County has one city, nine boroughs and 42 townships. As of the most recent United States Census (2020), Pennsylvania has 67 counties, which contain 1,547 townships, 955 boroughs (and 2 towns), and 56 cities. There are no unincorporated areas in the county, since all territory in Pennsylvania is incorporated.

The 52 incorporated municipalities in Lycoming County are the subject of the first list, which gives their names and etymologies, dates settled and incorporated, what they were formed from, area, population in 2020, and a map of their location within the county. Twenty other Pennsylvania counties were formed from or contain land originally in Lycoming County. The second list is of the 21 townships which were formerly incorporated in Lycoming County, and now are part of these other counties. It gives the same information as the first list, based on the current status of these townships.

In the 2020 census, the population of Lycoming County was 114,188, making it a "Fifth Class County" (defined by Pennsylvania law as having a population from "90,000 to 144,999"). The county seat is Williamsport, and Lycoming County is included in the Williamsport, Pennsylvania metropolitan statistical area. Lycoming County is located in north central Pennsylvania, about 130 miles (210 km) northwest of Philadelphia and 165 miles (266 km) east-northeast of Pittsburgh.

== Municipalities ==
Location of Lycoming County within Pennsylvania

As of 2024, Lycoming County has 52 incorporated municipalities: one city, nine boroughs, and 42 townships. Townships may contain villages, which the Pennsylvania Department of Transportation (PennDOT) marks with signs and defines as "unincorporated built-up areas which have a post office or a generally recognized name". Lycoming County's 42 townships include 96 villages (according to PennDOT), although three of these villages are partly located in neighboring Clinton County. Five of these villages (including one partly in Clinton County) are also recognized by the United States Census Bureau as census-designated places (CDPs), which are geographical areas defined for the purposes of compiling demographic data. Neither villages nor CDPs are actual jurisdictions under Pennsylvania law, and their territory is legally part of the incorporated township(s) where they are located. The first list also names the villages and CDPs within their respective townships. Four townships in Lycoming County do not include any villages: Anthony, Clinton, Mifflin, and Porter.

At 1,228.9 square miles (3,183 km^{2}) as of 2023, Lycoming County is the largest county by land area in Pennsylvania. Lycoming County is larger than Rhode Island, the smallest U.S. state, which has a land area of 1,033.9 square miles (2,678 km^{2}). Lycoming County's incorporated municipalities range in size from 0.552 square miles (1.43 km^{2}) (Montgomery borough) to 76.699 square miles (198.65 km^{2}) (McHenry Township). The city of Williamsport has the highest population of any municipality (27,754 or 24.3% of the county total as of 2020), while Brown Township in the northwest corner of the county has the lowest population (93 or 0.081%). Most of the county's population is in the valley along the West Branch Susquehanna River.^{[a]}

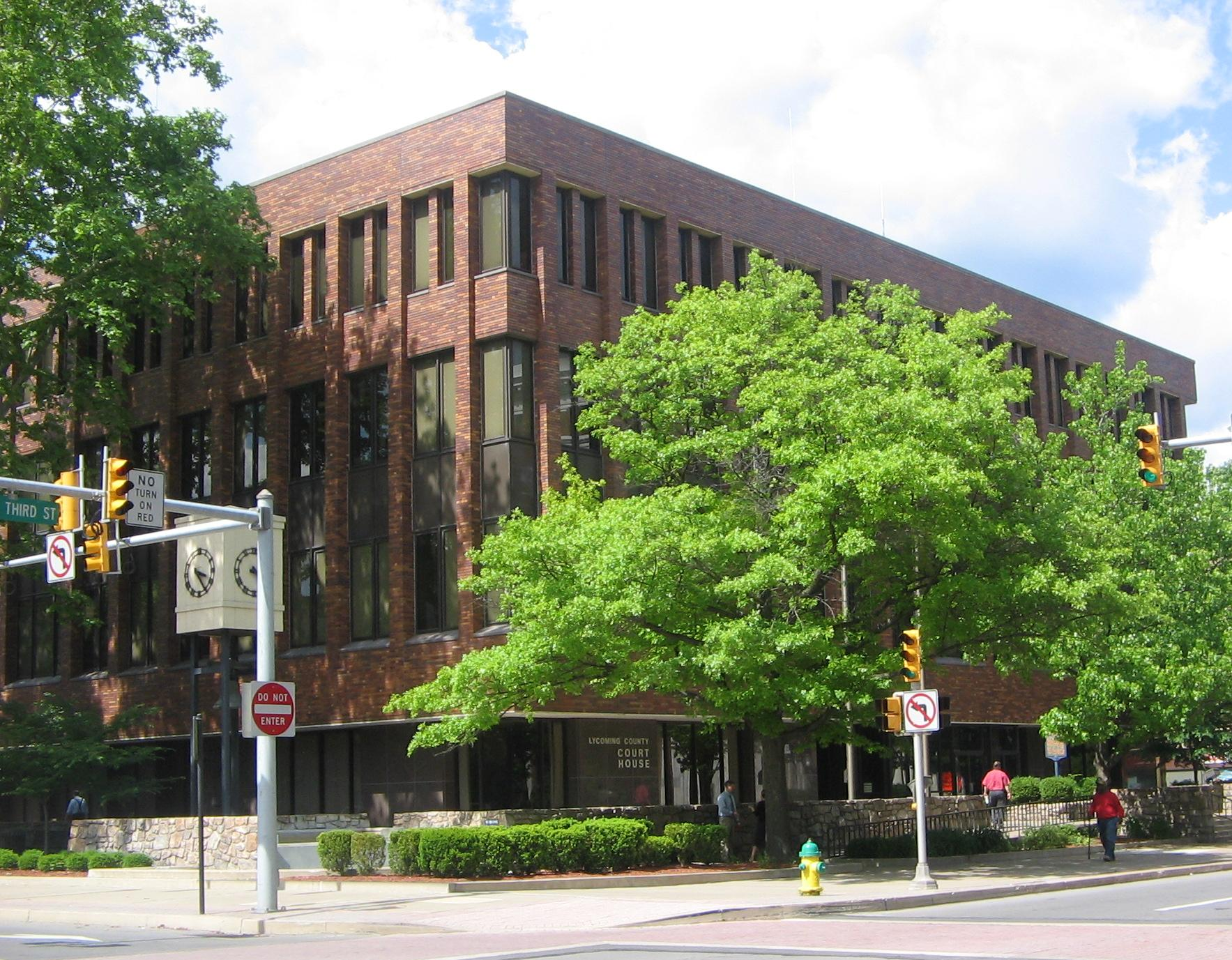
Lycoming County Courthouse, Williamsport

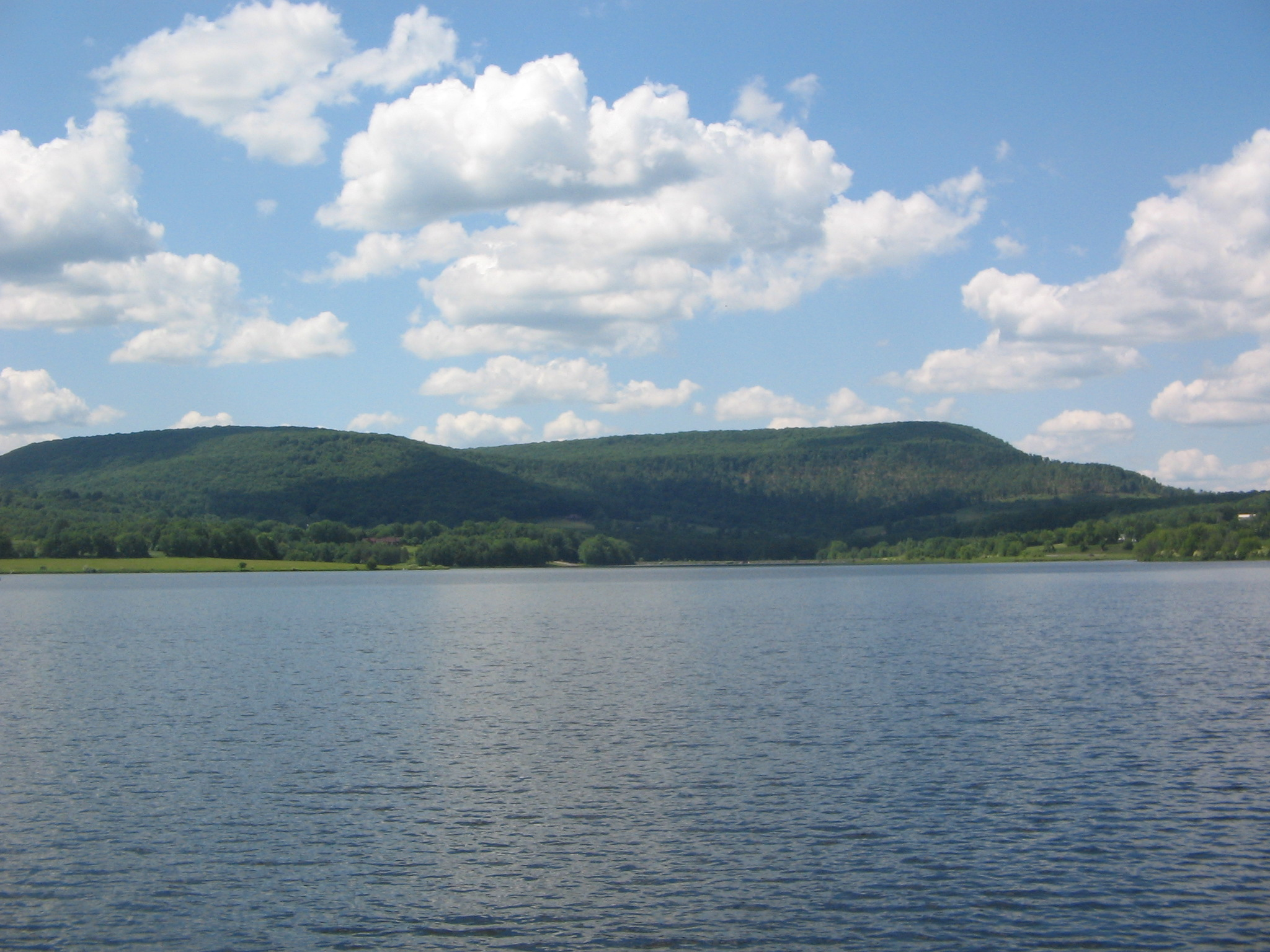
Rose Valley Lake, Gamble Township

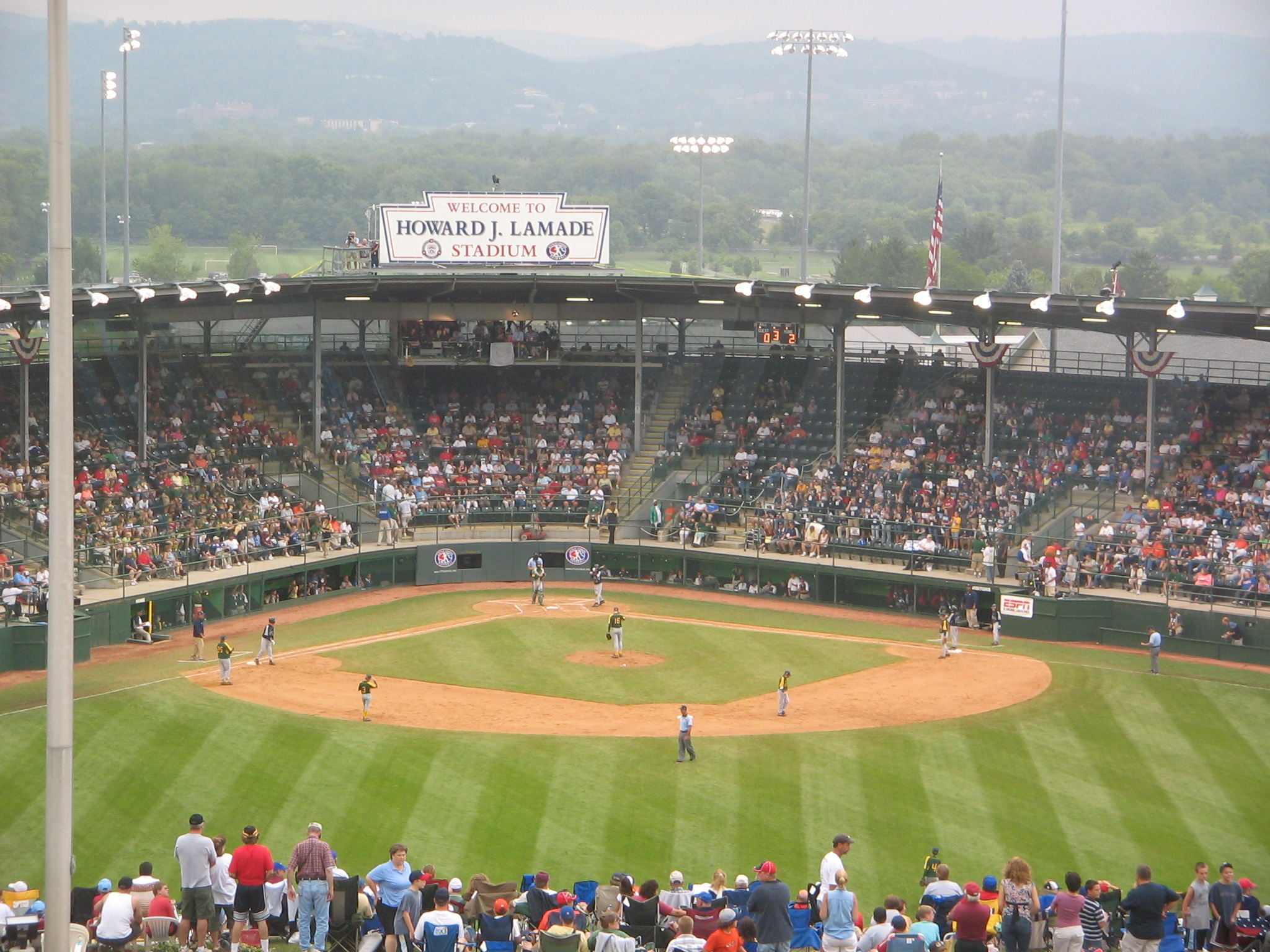
Little League World Series, South Williamsport

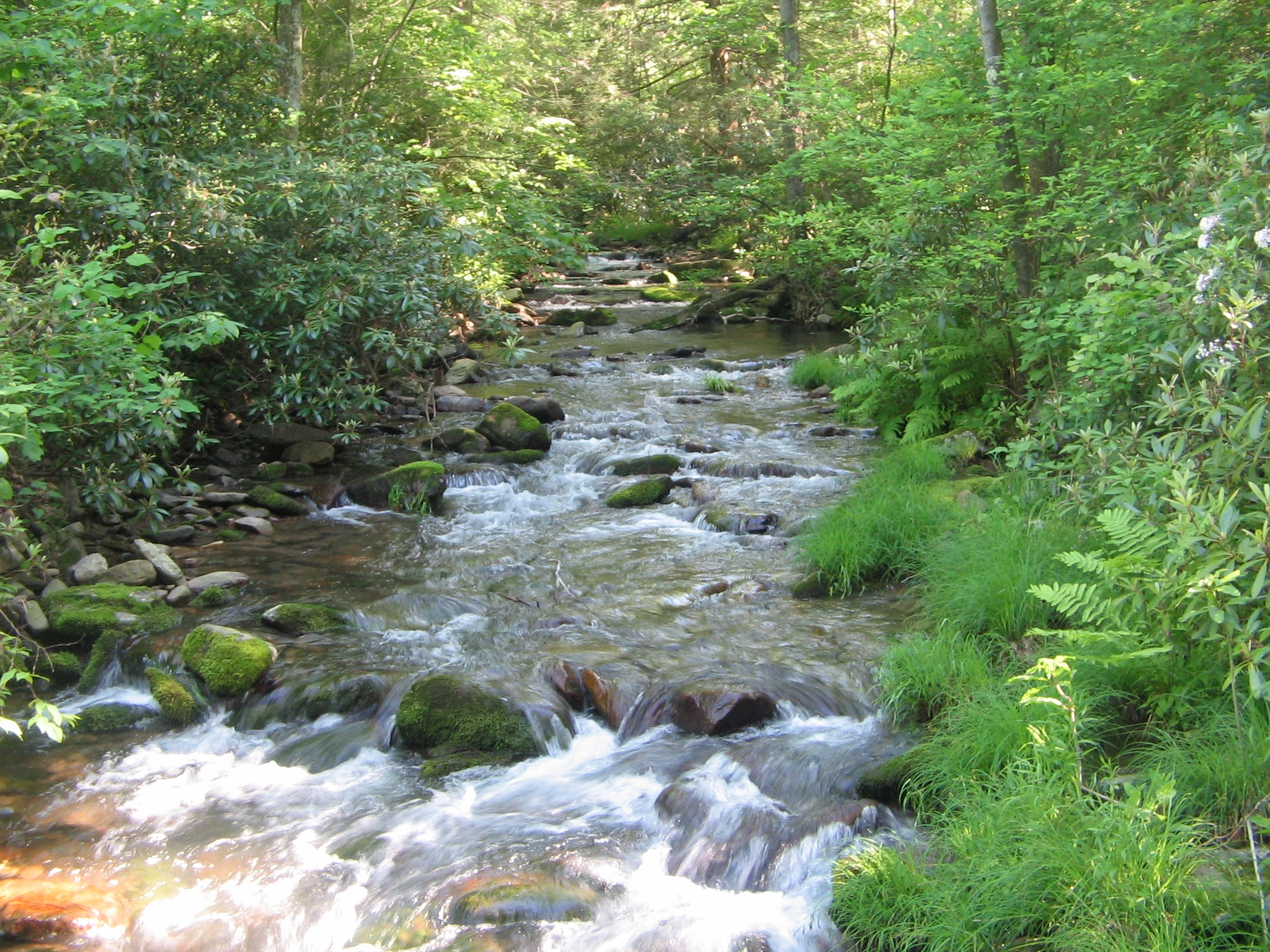
White Deer Hole Creek, Washington Township

Incorporated municipalities of Lycoming County, Pennsylvania
| Municipality (type) | Etymology | Settled | Incorporated | Formed from | Area in square miles (km^{2}) | Population as of 2020 | Map |
|---|---|---|---|---|---|---|---|
| Williamsport (city) | Named for William Ross (son of founder Michael Ross); county seat; laid out 1796 | 1769 | 1806 (borough), 1866 (city) | Loyalsock Township | 9.472 sq mi (24.53 km^{2}) | 27,754 | Williamsport highlighted in red on a map of Lycoming County |
| Duboistown (borough) | Named for founders John and Mathias Dubois, laid out 1852 | 1773 | 1878 | Armstrong Township | 0.678 sq mi (1.76 km^{2}) | 1,200 | Duboistown highlighted in red on a map of Lycoming County |
| Hughesville (borough) | Named for founder Jeptha Hughes; laid out 1816 | 1816 | 1852 | Muncy Township | 0.645 sq mi (1.67 km^{2}) | 2,154 | Hughesville highlighted in red on a map of Lycoming County |
| Jersey Shore (borough) | Named the "Jersey Shore" as its founders were from New Jersey and it was on the shore of the West Branch Susquehanna River; laid out 1820 | 1785 | 1826 | Porter Township | 1.182 sq mi (3.06 km^{2}) | 4,166 | Jersey Shore highlighted in red on a map of Lycoming County |
| Montgomery (borough) | Named for the "Montgomery Station" post office; known as "Black Hole" until circa 1836 (for Black Hole Creek) | 1783 | 1887 | Clinton Township | 0.552 sq mi (1.43 km^{2}) | 1,568 | Montgomery highlighted in red on a map of Lycoming County |
| Montoursville (borough) | Named for Madame Montour and her son Andrew Montour; laid out 1820 | 1768 | 1850 | Fairfield Township | 4.182 sq mi (10.83 km^{2}) | 4,750 | Montoursville highlighted in red on a map of Lycoming County |
| Muncy (borough) | Named for the Munsee phratry of the Lenape; laid out 1797 | 1797 | 1826 | Muncy Township | 0.844 sq mi (2.19 km^{2}) | 2,440 | Muncy highlighted in red on a map of Lycoming County |
| Picture Rocks (borough) | Named for Native American pictographs on the cliffs above Muncy Creek | 1848 | 1875 | Wolf Township | 1.001 sq mi (2.59 km^{2}) | 643 | Picture Rocks highlighted in red on a map of Lycoming County |
| Salladasburg (borough) | Named for founder Jacob P. Sallada; laid out 1837 | 1837 | 1884 | Mifflin Township | 0.790 sq mi (2.05 km^{2}) | 250 | Salladasburg highlighted in red on a map of Lycoming County |
| South Williamsport (borough) | Named for its geographic location, south of Williamsport; | 1790 | 1886 | Armstrong Township | 2.162 sq mi (5.60 km^{2}) | 6,261 | South Williamsport highlighted in red on a map of Lycoming County |
| Anthony Township | Named for Joseph B. Anthony, a county judge circa 1844 and later Pennsylvania Supreme Court justice | 1773 | 1844 | Lycoming Township | 15.595 sq mi (40.39 km^{2}) | 867 | Anthony Township highlighted in red on a map of Lycoming County |
| Armstrong Township | Named for James Armstrong, a local lawyer; includes the villages of Allens and Sylvan Dell | 1795 | 1842 | Clinton Township | 25.505 sq mi (66.06 km^{2}) | 686 | Armstrong Township highlighted in red on a map of Lycoming County |
| Bastress Township | Named for Solomon Bastress of Jersey Shore, former member of the state legislature and associate judge; includes the village of Bastress | 1837 | 1854 | Susquehanna Township | 9.423 sq mi (24.41 km^{2}) | 527 | Bastress Township highlighted in red on a map of Lycoming County |
| Brady Township | Named for the Brady family, some of the earliest settlers in the area; includes the village of Maple Hill and part of United States Penitentiary, Allenwood | 1790 | 1855 | Washington Township | 9.052 sq mi (23.44 km^{2}) | 501 | Brady Township highlighted in red on a map of Lycoming County |
| Brown Township | Named for Jacob Brown, a general from Pennsylvania in the War of 1812; includes the villages of Beulah Land, Cedar Run, Hillborn, Pump Station, and Slate Run | 1790 | 1815 | Mifflin and Pine Townships | 74.030 sq mi (191.74 km^{2}) | 93 | Brown Township highlighted in red on a map of Lycoming County |
| Cascade Township | Named for its cascading mountain streams; includes the villages of Kellyburg, Masten, and Wallis Run | 1843 | 1843 | Hepburn and Plunketts Creek Townships | 39.527 sq mi (102.37 km^{2}) | 422 | Cascade Township highlighted in red on a map of Lycoming County |
| Clinton Township | Named for DeWitt Clinton, governor of New York (1817–1822, 1824–1828) | 1825 | 1825 | Washington Township | 28.338 sq mi (73.40 km^{2}) | 3,720 | Clinton Township highlighted in red on a map of Lycoming County |
| Cogan House Township | Named for David Cogan, a pioneer who settled on Larrys Creek in 1825; includes the villages of Beech Grove, Brookside, Cogan House, Steam Valley, Steuben, and White Pine | 1825 | 1843 | Jackson and Mifflin Townships | 69.986 sq mi (181.26 km^{2}) | 935 | Cogan House Township highlighted in red on a map of Lycoming County |
| Cummings Township | Named for John Cummings, an associate on the bench; includes the villages of Ramsey and Waterville, as well as Little Pine and Upper Pine Bottom state parks | 1784 | 1832 | Mifflin and Brown Townships | 69.990 sq mi (181.27 km^{2}) | 265 | Cummings Township highlighted in red on a map of Lycoming County |
| Eldred Township | Named for C. D. Eldred, an associate on the bench; includes the village of Warrensville | 1802 | 1858 | Hepburn Township | 14.343 sq mi (37.15 km^{2}) | 1,997 | Eldred Township highlighted in red on a map of Lycoming County |
| Fairfield Township | Named for "beautiful rolling land of the fertile river bottom"; includes the village of Bella Vista | 1742 | 1825–1826 | Muncy Township | 12.355 sq mi (32.00 km^{2}) | 2,834 | Fairfield Township highlighted in red on a map of Lycoming County |
| Franklin Township | Named for Benjamin Franklin; includes the villages of Lairdsville and North Mountain | 1795 | 1822 | Moreland Township | 24.048 sq mi (62.28 km^{2}) | 903 | Franklin Township highlighted in red on a map of Lycoming County |
| Gamble Township | Named for James Gamble, the judge who authorized the election that led to its creation; includes the village of Calvert and Rose Valley Lake | 1784 | 1875 | Lewis and Cascade Townships | 46.775 sq mi (121.15 km^{2}) | 778 | Gamble Township highlighted in red on a map of Lycoming County |
| Hepburn Township | Named for William Hepburn, a founding father of Williamsport and Lycoming County; includes the villages of Balls Mills, Cogan Station, Haleeka, and Hepburnville | 1784 | 1804 | Loyalsock Township | 16.765 sq mi (43.42 km^{2}) | 2,578 | Hepburn Township highlighted in red on a map of Lycoming County |
| Jackson Township | Named for Andrew Jackson (prior to his presidency); includes the villages of Buttonwood and Jackson Corners | 1811 | 1824 | Lycoming Township | 37.256 sq mi (96.49 km^{2}) | 396 | Jackson Township highlighted in red on a map of Lycoming County |
| Jordan Township | Named for Alexander Jordan, president judge of the district court when formed; includes the villages of Biggertown, Lungerville, Richarts Grove, and Unityville | 1812 | 1854 | Franklin Township | 20.927 sq mi (54.20 km^{2}) | 850 | Jordan Township highlighted in red on a map of Lycoming County |
| Lewis Township | Named for Ellis Lewis, president judge of the district court when formed; includes the villages of Bodines, Grays Run, Powys, and Trout Run | 1812 | 1835 | Hepburn Township | 37.442 sq mi (96.97 km^{2}) | 862 | Lewis Township highlighted in red on a map of Lycoming County |
| Limestone Township | Named for its abundant limestone, originally "Adams Township" for John Adams (until 1835); includes the villages of Collomsville and Oriole, and the villages and CDPs of Oval, and Rauchtown (also in Crawford Township, Clinton County) | 1789 | 1824 | Nippenose and Wayne Townships^{[b]} | 33.745 sq mi (87.40 km^{2}) | 1,966 | Limestone Township highlighted in red on a map of Lycoming County |
| Loyalsock Township | Named for Loyalsock Creek; second most populous municipality in the county; includes the CDPs and villages of Faxon and Kenmar | 1768 | 1786 | Muncy Township | 21.451 sq mi (55.56 km^{2}) | 11,561 | Loyalsock Township highlighted in red on a map of Lycoming County |
| Lycoming Township | Named for Lycoming Creek; includes the villages of Oak Lynn (also in Old Lycoming Township), Perryville, and Quiggleville | 1773 | 1858 | Old Lycoming Township | 15.282 sq mi (39.58 km^{2}) | 1,606 | Lycoming Township highlighted in red on a map of Lycoming County |
| McHenry Township | Named for Alexander H. McHenry, a Jersey Shore surveyor; includes the villages of Bluestone, Cammal, Haneyville (also in Gallagher Township, Clinton County), Jersey Mills, Okome, and Ross | 1785 | 1861 | Brown and Cummings Townships | 76.699 sq mi (198.65 km^{2}) | 122 | McHenry Township highlighted in red on a map of Lycoming County |
| McIntyre Township | Named for Archibald McIntyre, a founder of the Williamsport and Elmira Railroad; includes the villages of Langdon, Marsh Hill, and Ralston | 1794 | 1848 | Lewis Township | 47.460 sq mi (122.92 km^{2}) | 461 | McIntyre Township highlighted in red on a map of Lycoming County |
| McNett Township | Named for H. I. McNett, who led the drive for its formation; includes the villages of Chemung, Ellenton, Leolyn, and Yorktown | 1805 | 1878 | McIntyre Township | 33.917 sq mi (87.84 km^{2}) | 143 | McNett Township highlighted in red on a map of Lycoming County |
| Mifflin Township | Named for Thomas Mifflin, the first governor of Pennsylvania (1790–1799) | 1790 | 1803 | Old Lycoming Township | 27.816 sq mi (72.04 km^{2}) | 1,089 | Mifflin Township highlighted in red on a map of Lycoming County |
| Mill Creek Township | Named for Mill Creek; includes part of the village of Huntersville (also in Wolf Township) | 1795 | 1879 | Muncy Township | 11.426 sq mi (29.59 km^{2}) | 582 | Mill Creek Township highlighted in red on a map of Lycoming County |
| Moreland Township | Named for a legend that the acres surveyed here were larger than a standard acre; includes the villages of Moreland and Opp | 1790 | 1813 | Muncy Creek Township | 24.047 sq mi (62.28 km^{2}) | 1,015 | Moreland Township highlighted in red on a map of Lycoming County |
| Muncy Township | Named for the Munsee phratry of the Lenape; as it is older than Lycoming County, it is often called the "Mother Township"; includes the village of Pennsdale | 1772 | 1772 | One of the seven original townships of Northumberland County | 15.708 sq mi (40.68 km^{2}) | 1,178 | Muncy Township highlighted in red on a map of Lycoming County |
| Muncy Creek Township | Named for Muncy Creek; includes the village of Clarkstown | 1773 | 1797 | Muncy Township | 20.724 sq mi (53.67 km^{2}) | 3,573 | Muncy Creek Township highlighted in red on a map of Lycoming County |
| Nippenose Township | Named for the Native American word "Nippeno-wi", meaning a warm and genial summer-like place; includes the village of Antes Fort (named for Fort Antes, abandoned during the Big Runaway) | 1769 | 1786 | Bald Eagle Township^{[a]} | 11.517 sq mi (29.83 km^{2}) | 661 | Nippenose Township highlighted in red on a map of Lycoming County |
| Old Lycoming Township | Named indirectly for Lycoming Creek, it was originally part of Lycoming Township, the name was changed in 1858 when the township was divided; includes the CDP and village of Garden View and villages of Grimesville and Oak Lynn (also in Lycoming Township) | 1773 | 1785 | Iroquois land purchased as part of Northumberland County, before this was run by the Fair Play Men | 9.442 sq mi (24.45 km^{2}) | 4,975 | Old Lycoming Township highlighted in red on a map of Lycoming County |
| Penn Township | Named for Penn Township, Berks County; includes the villages of Beaver Lake and Strawbridge | 1774 | 1828 | Muncy Township | 26.587 sq mi (68.86 km^{2}) | 895 | Penn Township highlighted in red on a map of Lycoming County |
| Piatt Township | Named for William Piatt, an associate county judge when it was created; includes the villages of Larrys Creek and Larryville | 1769 | 1858 | Mifflin Township | 10.092 sq mi (26.14 km^{2}) | 1,047 | Piatt Township highlighted in red on a map of Lycoming County |
| Pine Township | Named for its vast stands of pine trees; includes the villages of Carsontown, English Center, Lorenton, Oregon Hill, and Texas | 1806 | 1856 | Brown, Cummings and Cogan House Townships | 75.072 sq mi (194.44 km^{2}) | 258 | Pine Township highlighted in red on a map of Lycoming County |
| Plunketts Creek Township | Named for Plunketts Creek; includes the villages of Barbours, Dunwoody Camp, Hoppestown, and Proctor | 1776 | 1838 | Franklin Township and Davidson Township now part of Sullivan County | 54.075 sq mi (140.05 km^{2}) | 597 | Plunketts Creek Township highlighted in red on a map of Lycoming County |
| Porter Township | Named for David R. Porter, Pennsylvania governor (1839–1845) | 1772 | 1840 | Mifflin Township | 7.903 sq mi (20.47 km^{2}) | 1,528 | Porter Township highlighted in red on a map of Lycoming County |
| Shrewsbury Township | Named for Shrewsbury Township, New Jersey; includes the villages of Camp Genesee, Glen Mawr, and Tivoli | 1794 | 1804 | Muncy Township | 18.748 sq mi (48.56 km^{2}) | 418 | Shrewsbury Township highlighted in red on a map of Lycoming County |
| Susquehanna Township | Named for the West Branch Susquehanna River which forms its northern boundary; includes the village of Nisbet | 1801 | 1838 | Nippenose and Armstrong Townships | 7.179 sq mi (18.59 km^{2}) | 968 | Susquehanna Township highlighted in red on a map of Lycoming County |
| Upper Fairfield Township | Originally named "Pollock Township" for local judge, name changed in 1853; includes the villages of Fairfield Center, Farragut, and Loyalsockville | 1796 | 1851 | Fairfield Township | 18.118 sq mi (46.93 km^{2}) | 1,807 | Upper Fairfield Township highlighted in red on a map of Lycoming County |
| Washington Township | Named for George Washington; includes the villages of Elimsport and Texas Village | 1760 | 1785 | Bald Eagle Township^{[b]} | 48.327 sq mi (125.17 km^{2}) | 1,768 | Washington Township highlighted in red on a map of Lycoming County |
| Watson Township | Named for Oliver Watson, president of a bank in Williamsport; includes the villages of Springer Corners (also in Gallagher Township, Clinton County) and Tomb | 1784 | 1845 | Porter and Cummings Townships | 23.425 sq mi (60.67 km^{2}) | 534 | Watson Township highlighted in red on a map of Lycoming County |
| Wolf Township | Named for George Wolf, governor of Pennsylvania (1829–1835); includes the villages of Bryan Mills and Huntersville (also in Mill Creek Township) | 1777 | 1834 | Muncy Township | 19.777 sq mi (51.22 km^{2}) | 3,105 | Wolf Township highlighted in red on a map of Lycoming County |
| Woodward Township | Named for Apollos Woodward, an associate judge; includes the villages of Linden and Pine Run | 1772 | 1855 | Anthony Township | 13.543 sq mi (35.08 km^{2}) | 2,046 | Woodward Township highlighted in red on a map of Lycoming County |

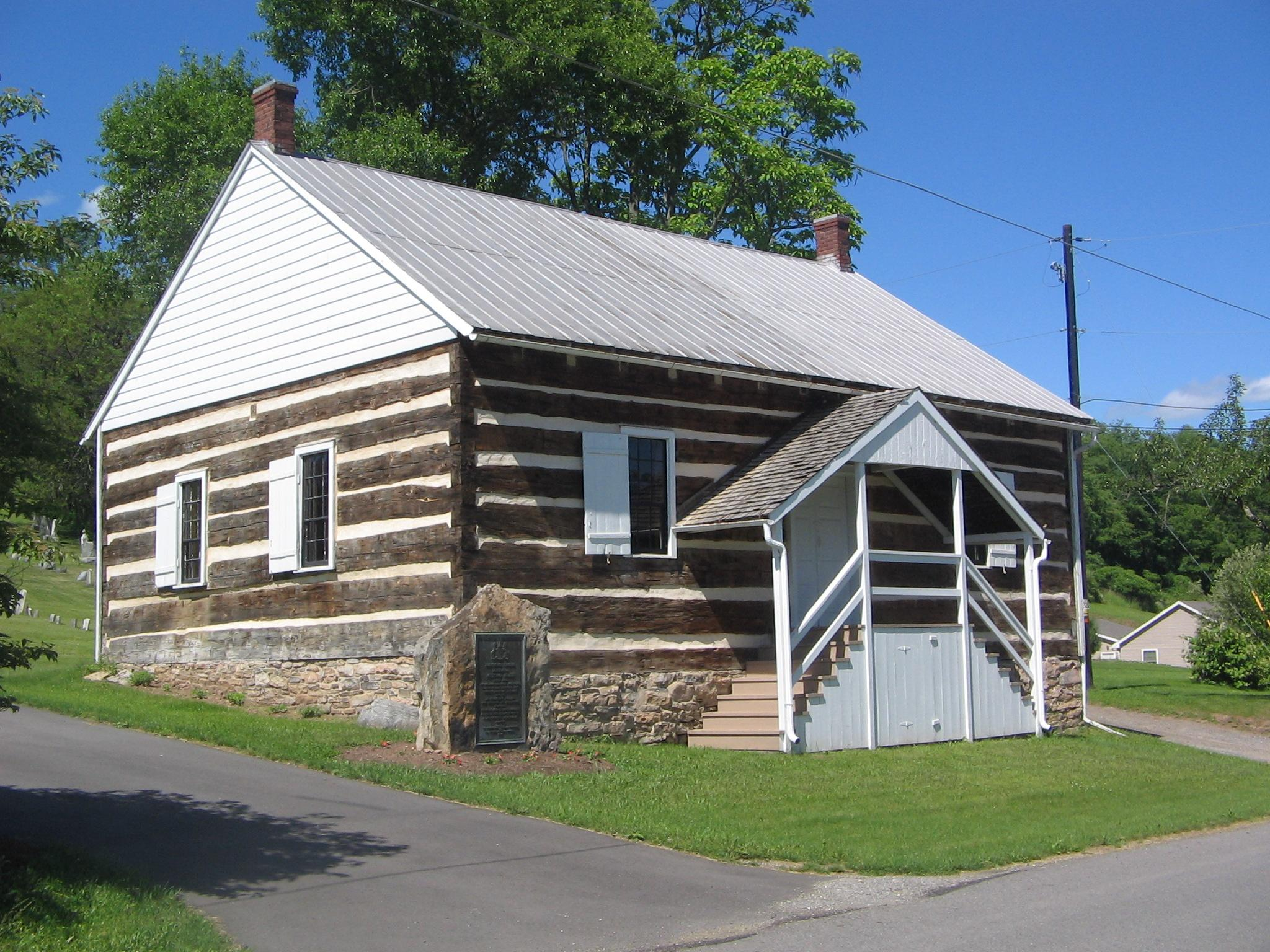
Dunkard Church, Hepburn Township

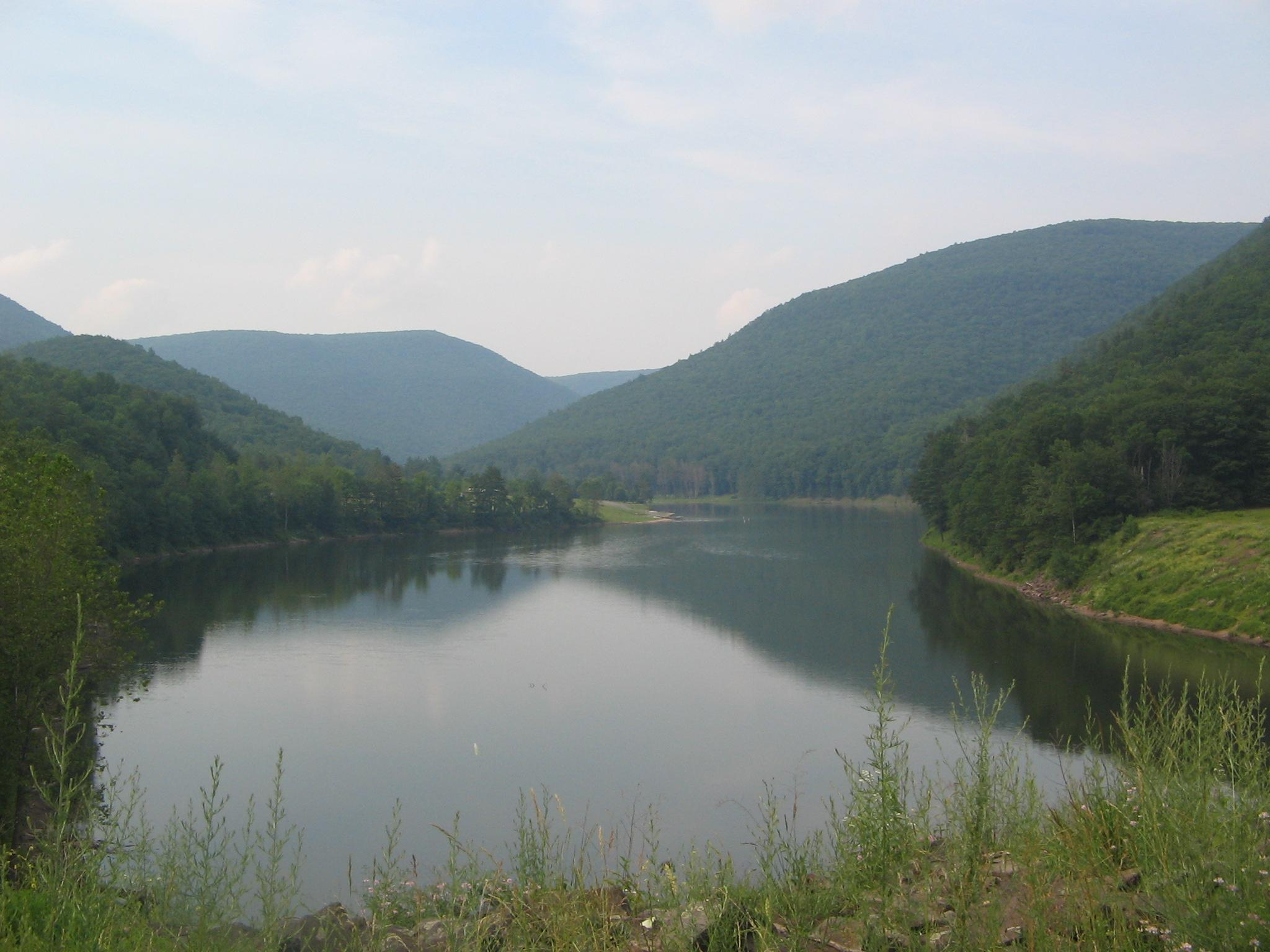
Little Pine State Park, Cummings Township

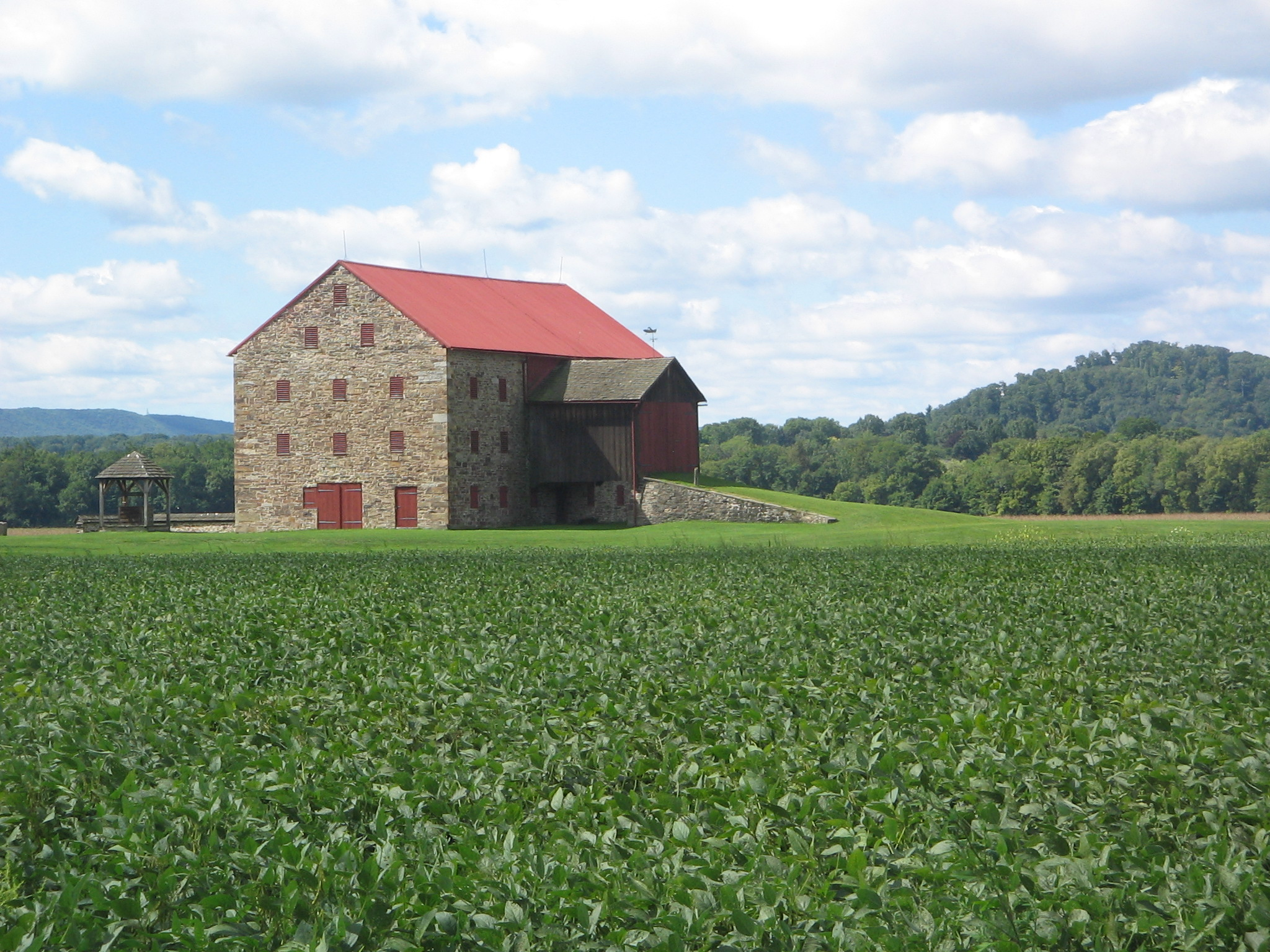
Stone Barn, Fairfield Township

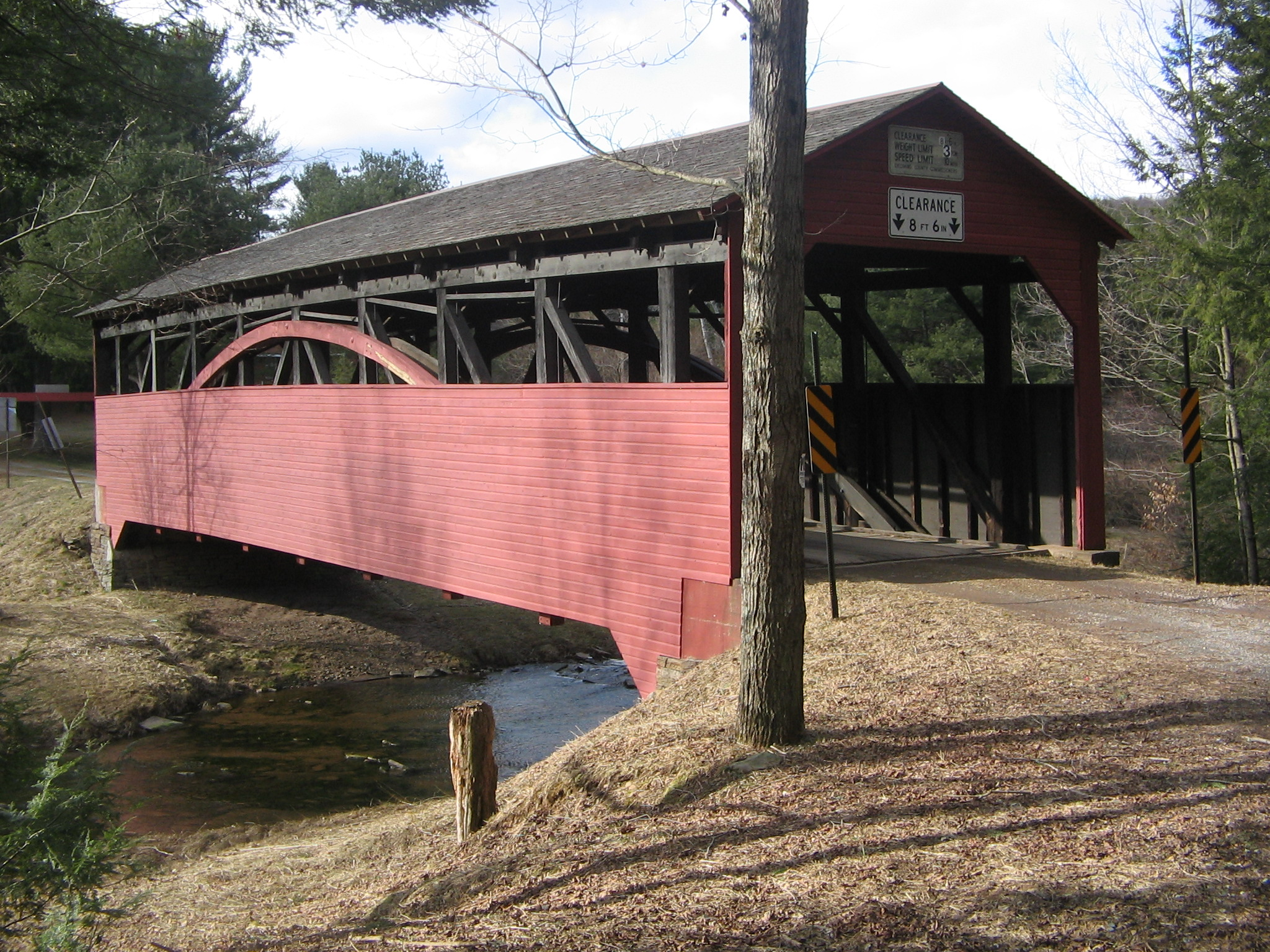
Covered Bridge, Cogan House Township

== Former townships ==
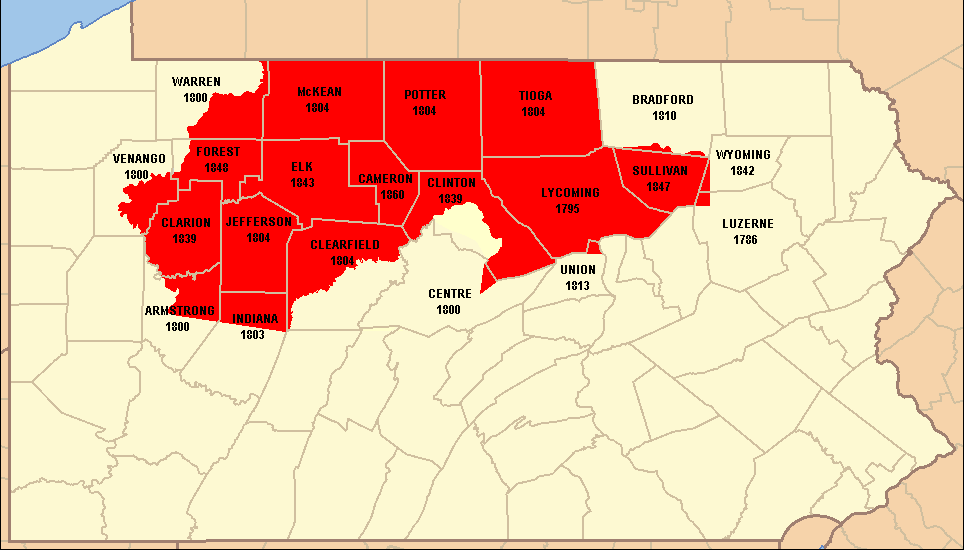
Map of the original extent of Lycoming County circa 1795, with current Pennsylvania county outlines for reference. Click on map to see dates.

The territory which today makes up Lycoming County was purchased from the Iroquois in two treaties signed at Fort Stanwix in New York: the first treaty was in 1768, and the second treaty was in 1784. The county was formed on April 13, 1795, from part of Northumberland County. The county originally contained seven townships when formed: Lower Bald Eagle, Loyalsock, Lycoming, Muncy, Nippenose, Pine Creek, and Washington. Today Pine Creek is part of Clinton County and Lower Bald Eagle is part of both Centre and Clinton counties, but the rest are still in Lycoming County, although many other municipalities have been formed from these since.

When originally formed in 1795, Lycoming County was "roughly estimated at about 12,000 square miles" (31,000 km^{2}). Its territory stretched north to the New York state line, west to the Allegheny River, south nearly to the source of the West Branch Susquehanna River, and east to include modern Sullivan County and a bit beyond. However, by 1800, just five years after its formation, the first territory was taken from it to form new counties, a process that continued until 1847.

Twenty other Pennsylvania counties today contain land that was once part of Lycoming County: five were formed completely from it (Jefferson, McKean, Potter, Tioga, and Sullivan), eight were formed from it and other counties (Armstrong, Bradford, Centre, Clearfield, Clinton, Indiana, Venango, and Warren), three were formed from counties that were themselves formed partly from it (Cameron, Clarion, and Elk), Forest was formed from a county that was formed completely from it (Jefferson), two (Luzerne and Wyoming) contain territory that was part of lycoming County in 1795, and finally Union received a township from it in 1861. The second table lists each of the twenty one known former incorporated areas in the county, and information on the modern township successors of these today.

Former townships of Lycoming County, Pennsylvania
| Municipality (type) | Remarks | Settled | Incorporated | Area in square miles (km^{2}) | Population as of 2020 | Map |
|---|---|---|---|---|---|---|
| Allison Township^{[c]} | Now in Clinton County, incorporated as part of Lycoming County | ? | before 1839 | 1.627 sq mi (4.21 km^{2}) | 229 | |
| Brady Township (now Gregg Township) | Now in Union County, incorporated as part of Lycoming County | 1798 | 1798 | 15.113 sq mi (39.14 km^{2}) | 4,096 | |
| Ceres Township | Now in McKean County, incorporated as part of Lycoming County | 1798 | 1798 | 40.514 sq mi (104.93 km^{2}) | 846 | |
| Chapman Township^{[c]} | Now in Clinton County, incorporated as part of Lycoming County | 1780 | before 1839 | 100.974 sq mi (261.52 km^{2}) | 893 | |
| Cherry Township^{[d]} | Now in Sullivan County, incorporated as part of Lycoming County | 1816 | 1824 | 58.183 sq mi (150.69 km^{2}) | 1,481 | |
| Colebrook Township^{[c]} | Now in Clinton County, incorporated as part of Lycoming County | 1777 | before 1839 | 18.629 sq mi (48.25 km^{2}) | 196 | |
| Davidson Township^{[d]} | Now in Sullivan County, incorporated as part of Lycoming County | 1806 | 1833 | 77.921 sq mi (201.81 km^{2}) | 549 | |
| Dunnstable Township^{[c]} | Now in Clinton County, incorporated as part of Lycoming County | 1785 | before 1810 | 9.611 sq mi (24.89 km^{2}) | 1,005 | |
| Elkland Township^{[d]} | Now in Sullivan County, incorporated as part of Lycoming County | 1798 | 1804 | 38.690 sq mi (100.21 km^{2}) | 549 | |
| Forks Township^{[d]} | Now in Sullivan County, incorporated as part of Lycoming County | 1794 | 1833 | 43.432 sq mi (112.49 km^{2}) | 374 | |
| Fox Township^{[d]} | Now in Sullivan County, incorporated as part of Lycoming County | 1800 | 1839 | 38.949 sq mi (100.88 km^{2}) | 310 | |
| Grove Township^{[c]} | Now in Cameron County, incorporated as part of Lycoming County, then one of twelve original townships in Clinton County (1839), then one of four original townships in Cameron (1860) | 1811 | before 1839 | 73.926 sq mi (191.47 km^{2}) | 113 | |
| Limestone Township (now Crawford Township)^{[c]} | Now in Clinton County, incorporated as part of Lycoming County, name changed 1841. | 1780 | 1824 | 22.134 sq mi (57.33 km^{2}) | 973 | |
| Lower Bald Eagle Township^{[b]} (now Bald Eagle Township) | Now in Clinton County, incorporated as part of Northumberland County, became part of Lycoming County in 1795 | 1772 | 1772 | 42.055 sq mi (108.92 km^{2}) | 1,005 | |
| Lumber Township^{[c]} | Now in Cameron County, incorporated as part of Lycoming County, then one of twelve original townships in Clinton County (1839), then one of four original townships in Cameron (1860) | 1810 | before 1839 | 73.926 sq mi (191.47 km^{2}) | 182 | |
| Pine Creek Township^{[c]} | Now in Clinton County, incorporated as part of Lycoming County | 1785 | 1772 | 14.910 sq mi (38.62 km^{2}) | 3,416 | |
| Plunketts Creek Township^{[d]} (now Hillsgrove Township) | Now in Sullivan County, incorporated as part of Lycoming County, name changed in 1856. | 1786 | 1847 | 28.529 sq mi (73.89 km^{2}) | 227 | |
| Shrewsbury Township^{[d]} | Now in Sullivan County, incorporated as part of Lycoming County | 1799 | 1803 | 47.579 sq mi (123.23 km^{2}) | 304 | |
| Tioga Township | Now in Tioga County, incorporated as part of Lycoming County | 1792 | 1797 | 39.858 sq mi (103.23 km^{2}) | 938 | |
| Upper Bald Eagle Township^{[b]} (now Spring Township) | Now in Centre County, incorporated as part of Northumberland County, became part of Lycoming County in 1795; Name changed in 1801 to "Spring Township" | 1772 | 1772 | 26.735 sq mi (69.24 km^{2}) | 7,979 | |
| Wayne Township^{[c]} | Now in Clinton County, incorporated as part of Lycoming County; named for "Mad" Anthony Wayne | 1768 | 1798 | 22.861 sq mi (59.21 km^{2}) | 1,451 | |

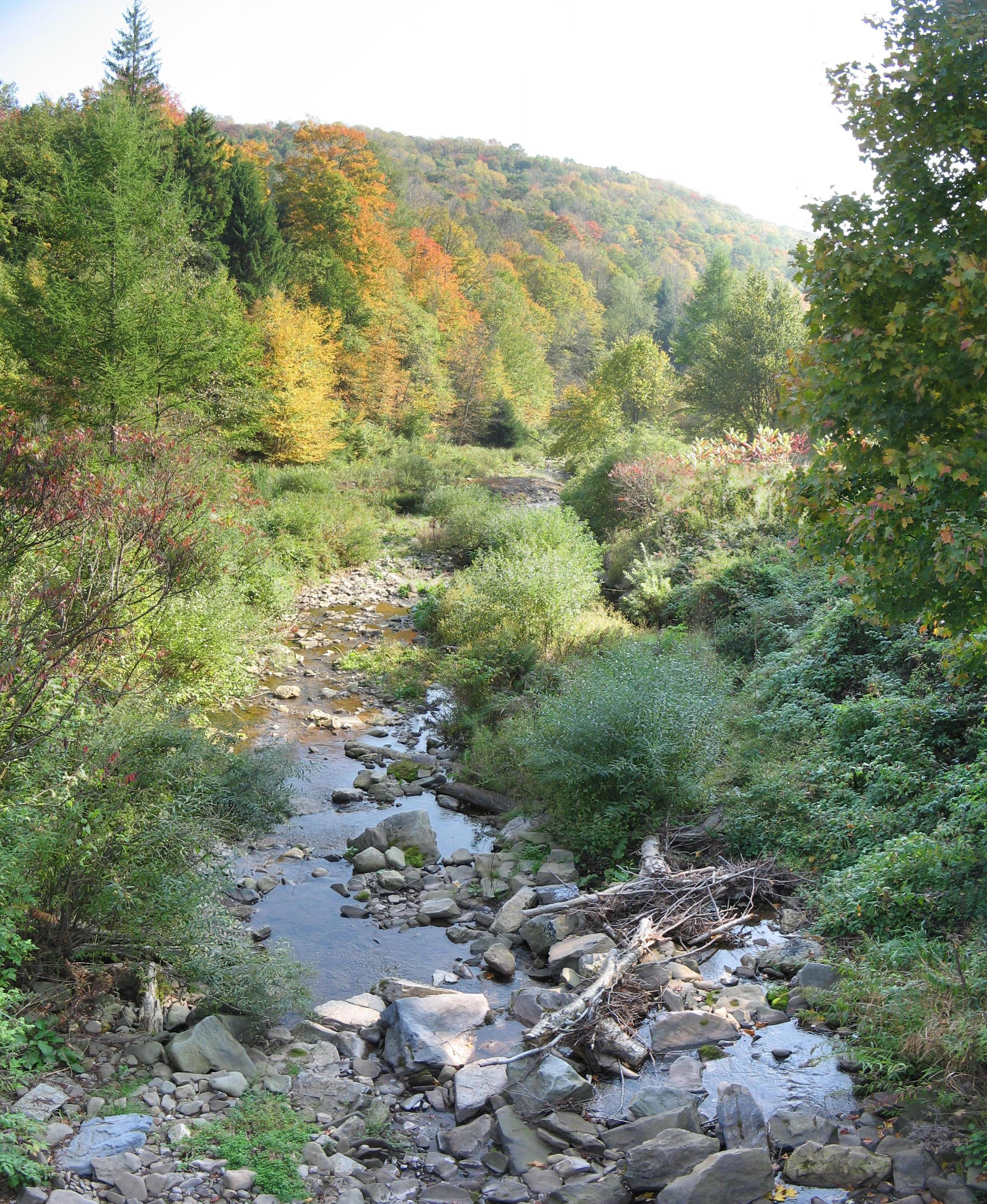
Pleasant Stream, McNett and Cascade Townships

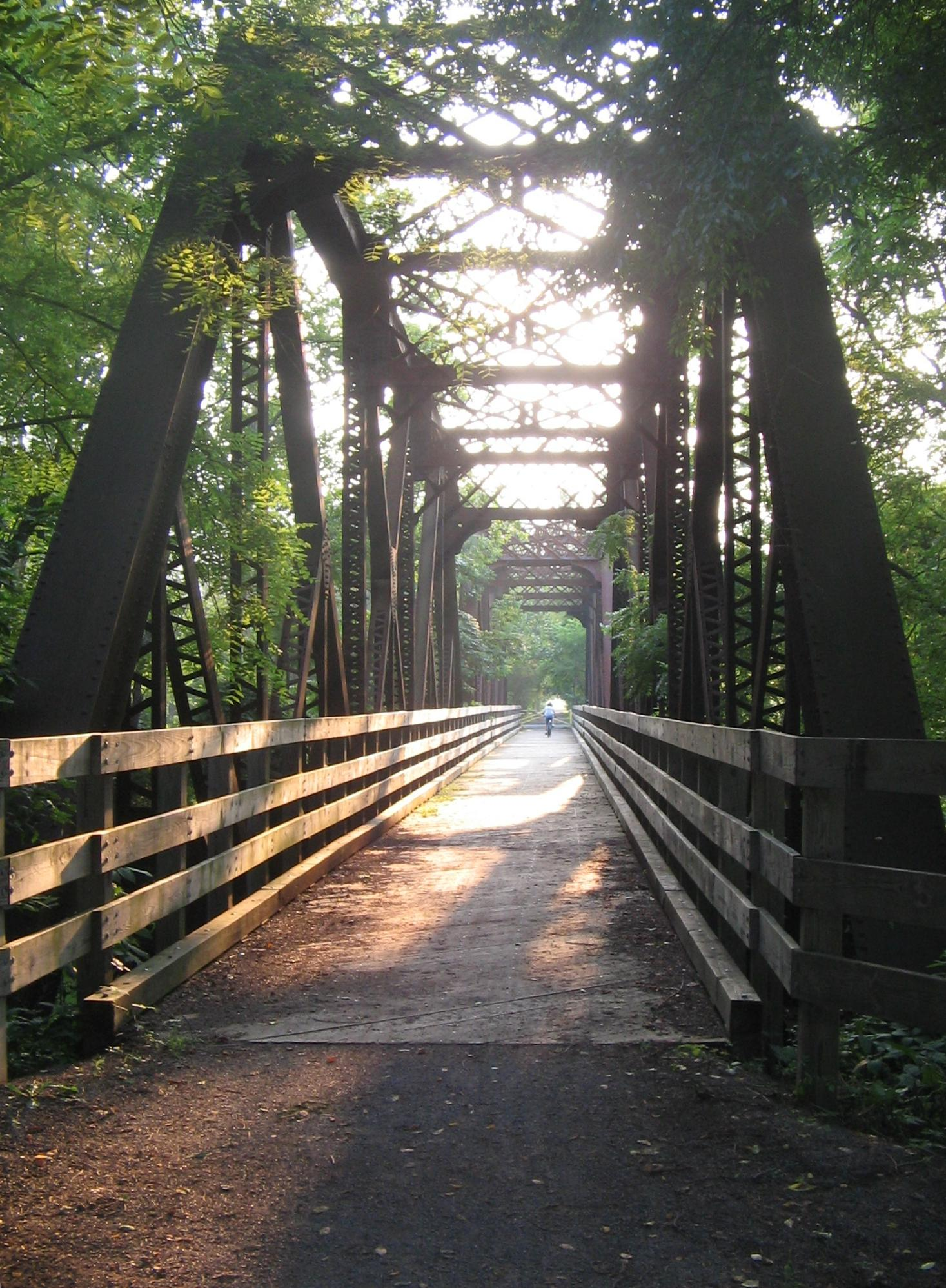
Little Pine Creek Bridge, Cummings Township

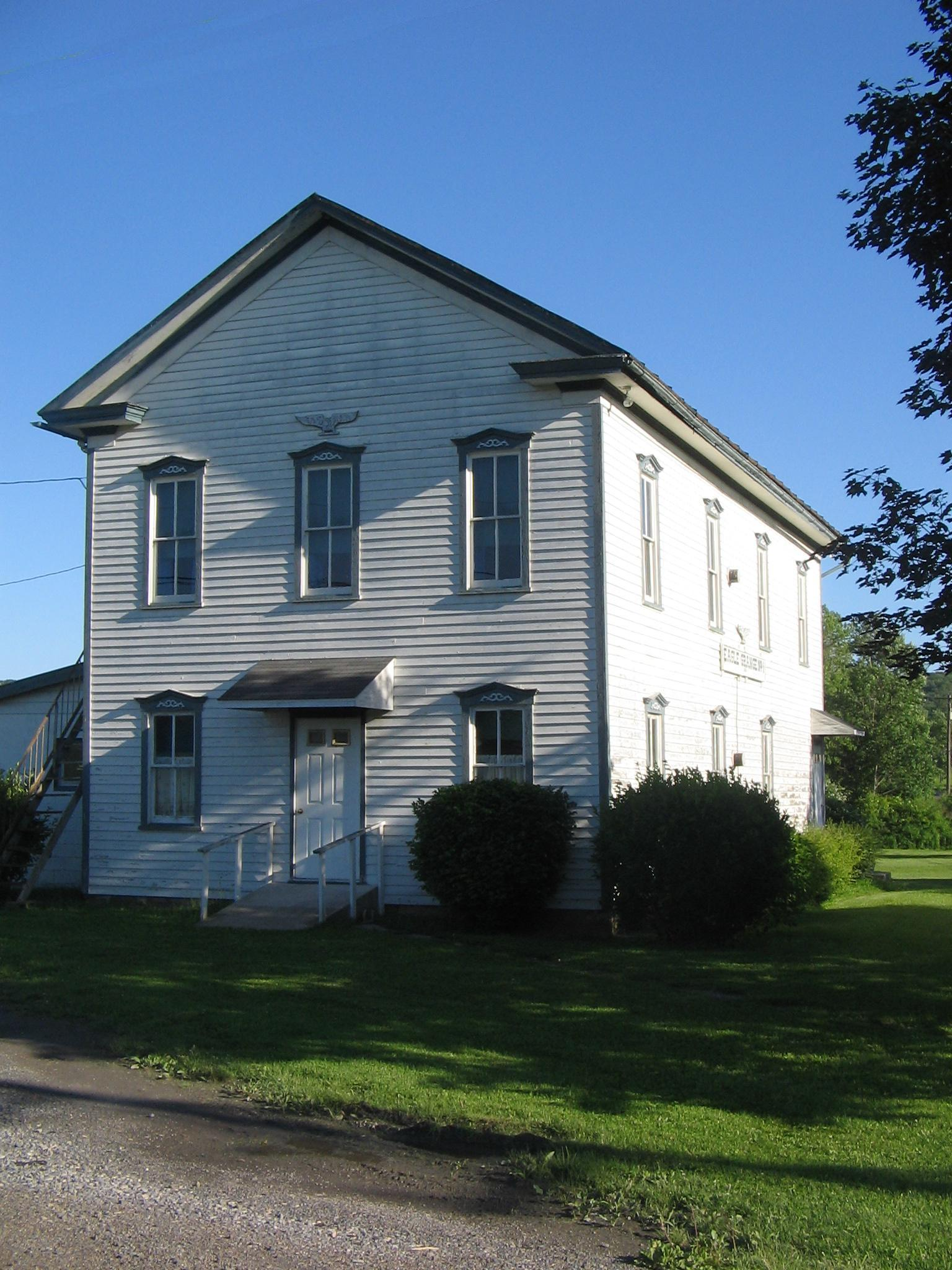
Eagle Grange No. 1, Clinton Township

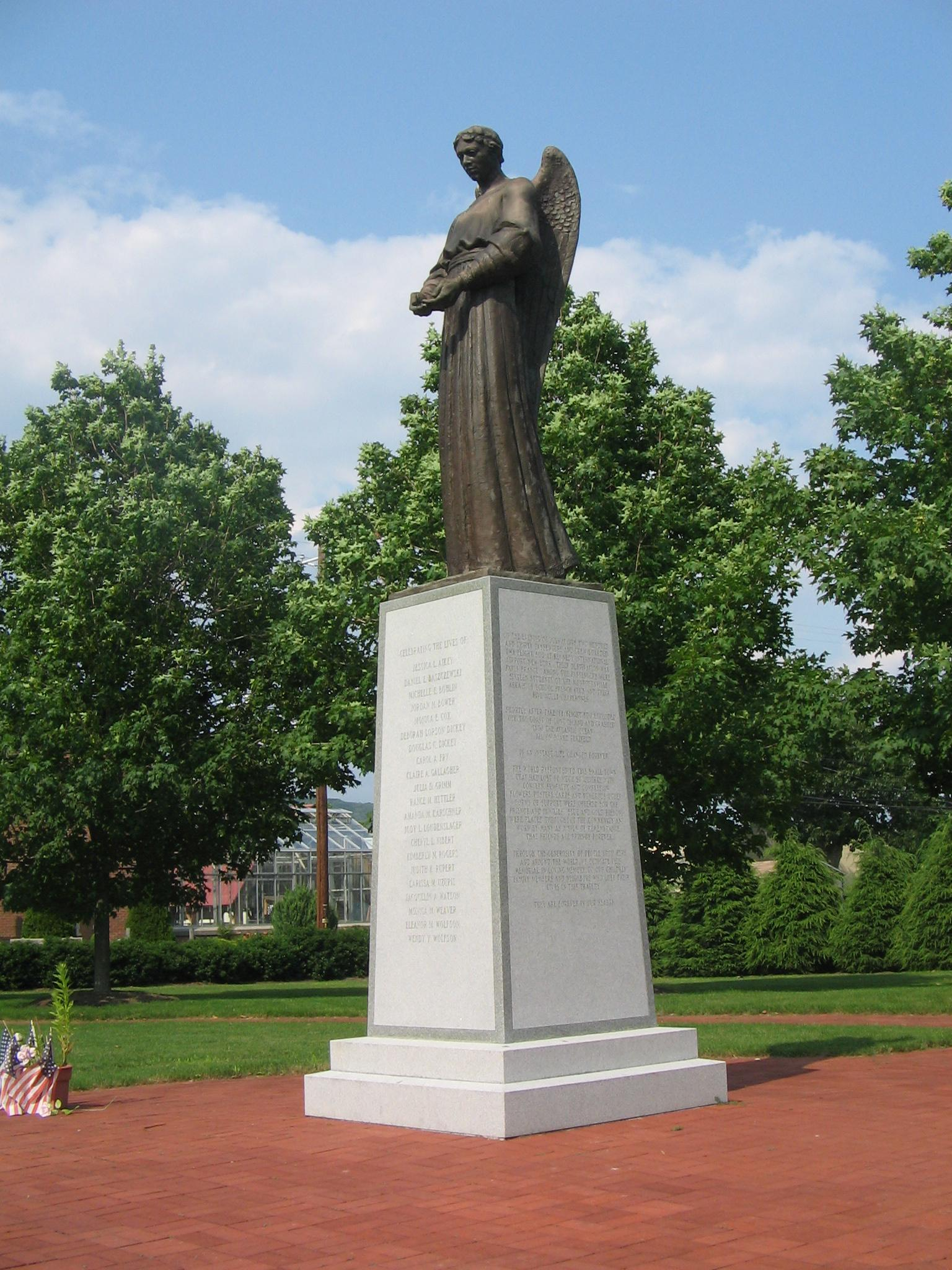
TWA Flight 800 Memorial, Montoursville

== Map of municipalities ==
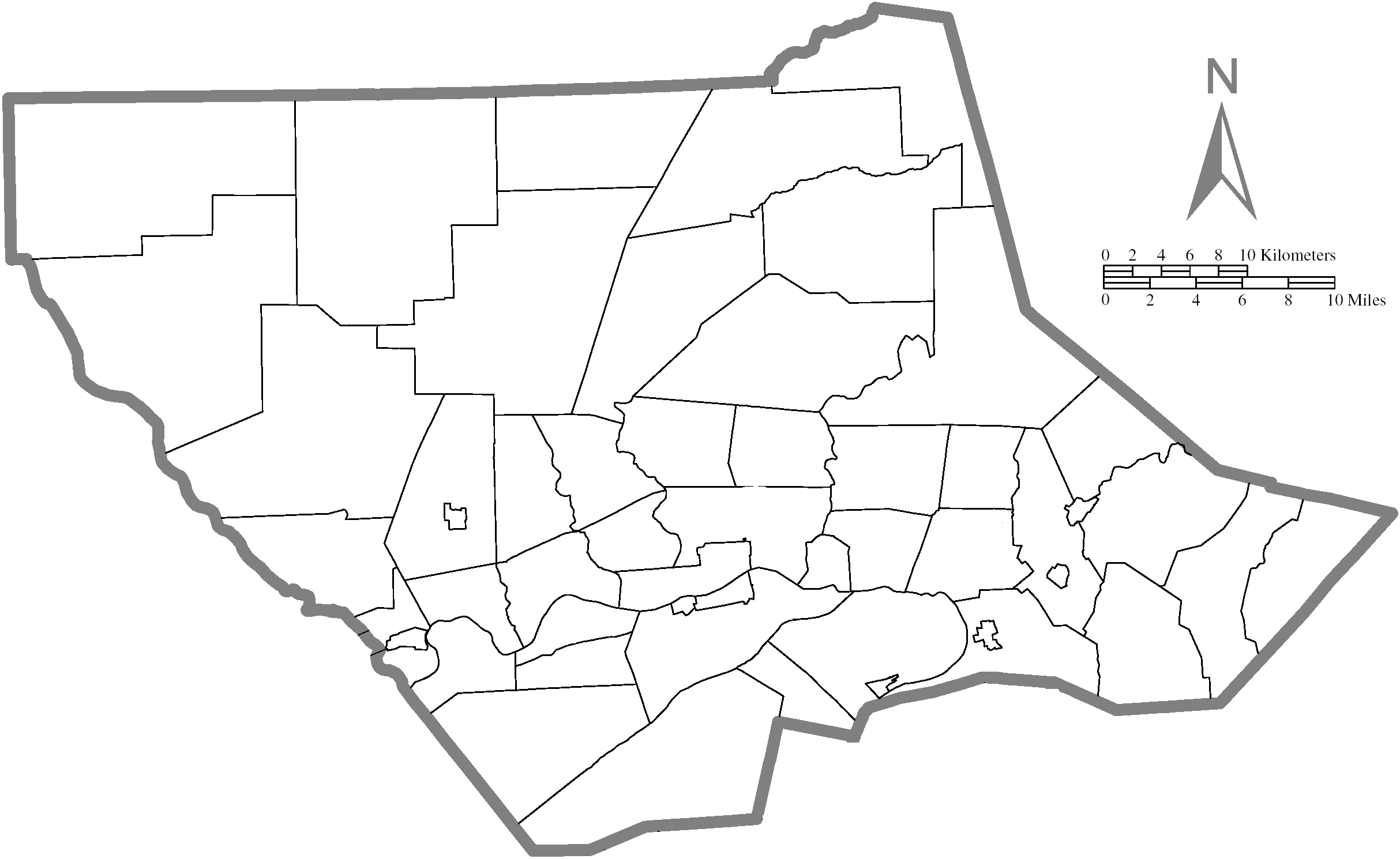
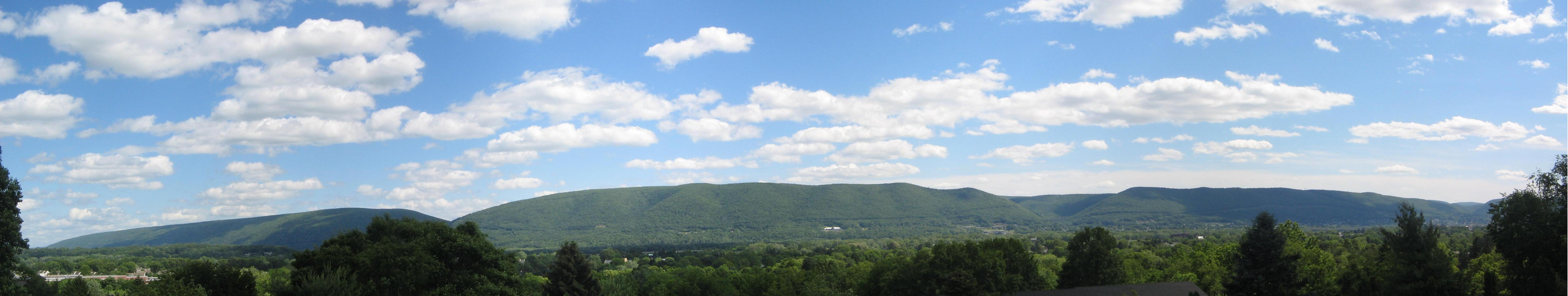
Bald Eagle Mountain Panorama as seen looking south from Loyalsock Township

== See also ==
- History of Lycoming County, Pennsylvania
- List of villages in Lycoming County, Pennsylvania

== Notes ==
a. The sum of the 2020 US Census populations of all the municipalities that border the West Branch Susquehanna River in Lycoming County is 76,002, or 66.56% of the county's total population. The municipalities bordering the river are: Williamsport (city); Duboistown, Jersey Shore, Montgomery, Montoursville, and South Williamsport (boroughs); and Armstrong, Brady, Clinton, Fairfield, Loyalsock, Muncy, Muncy Creek, Nippenose, Piatt, Porter, Susquehanna, and Woodward (townships).

b. Northumberland County was formed in 1772 with seven original townships. Only two of the seven (Bald Eagle and Muncy Townships) had land which is now part of Lycoming County. In August 1785, Washington Township was formed from Bald Eagle Township, and in November 1785 parts of Bald Eagle were added to the newly formed Lycoming and Pine Creek townships (the bulk of their territory had been purchased from the Iroquois in 1784). In May 1786, Bald Eagle Township was split into three new townships: Nippenose, Upper Bald Eagle, and Lower Bald Eagle. In 1789, Mifflin County was formed from Upper Bald Eagle Township and half of Potter Township (itself formed partly from the original Bald Eagle Township in May 1774).

When Lycoming County was formed in 1795, Lower Bald Eagle was one of its original seven townships. Centre County was formed in 1800 from parts of Huntingdon, Lycoming, Mifflin, and Northumberland counties. Centre County originally had eight townships, with two (Lower Bald Eagle and Upper Bald Eagle), taken from Lycoming County. It is not clear if this Upper Bald Eagle was a newly formed township, or some portion of the original Northumberland County township not taken when Mifflin County was formed. Some territory from Lower Bald Eagle Township remained in Lycoming County after Centre county was formed.

In 1801, Centre County renamed "Upper Bald Eagle Township" as "Spring Township" and "Lower Bald Eagle Township" as "Bald Eagle Township". In 1839 Clinton County was formed from Centre and Lycoming counties, with Bald Eagle Township as one of three taken from Centre County. Today neither Centre nor Lycoming counties have a township named "Bald Eagle".

c. When Clinton County was formed in 1839, there were 12 original townships. It "embraced the following townships then in Centre County, viz., Bald Eagle, Lamar, and Logan; and from Lycoming, Allison, Chapman, Colebrook, Dunstable, Grove, Lumber, Limestone, Pine Creek, and Wayne." Since Lamar was formed from Bald Eagle, 11 of the 12 original townships came at least indirectly from Lycoming County. Limestone was split from the Lycoming County township of the same name, then attached to Wayne Township, and renamed Crawford Township when it was reformed. Grove and Lumber townships became part of Cameron County, but the remaining ten townships are still in Clinton County.

Wayne Township is now in Clinton County. According to Meginness (Chapter 14), Wayne was formed from Nippenose Township in 1798, while part of Lycoming County. Note that the PHMC sheet on Clinton County incorrectly says it was formed as part of Northumberland County, but neither the Lycoming nor Northumberland County histories support this.

d. When originally formed in 1803 as part of Lycoming County, Shrewsbury Township encompassed all of what is now Sullivan County. Elkland Township was formed from Shrewsbury in 1804, as were Cherry (1824), Davidson and Forks Townships (both 1833). Plunketts Creek Township was formed from Franklin and Davidson Townships in 1838, and Fox Township was formed from Elkland in 1839. When Sullivan County was formed in 1847 (entirely from Lycoming County), both Shrewsbury and Plunketts Creek Townships were split, with each county originally having a township of that name (Plunketts Creek Township in Sullivan County changed its name to Hillsgrove Township in 1856).
