= List of villages in Lycoming County, Pennsylvania =

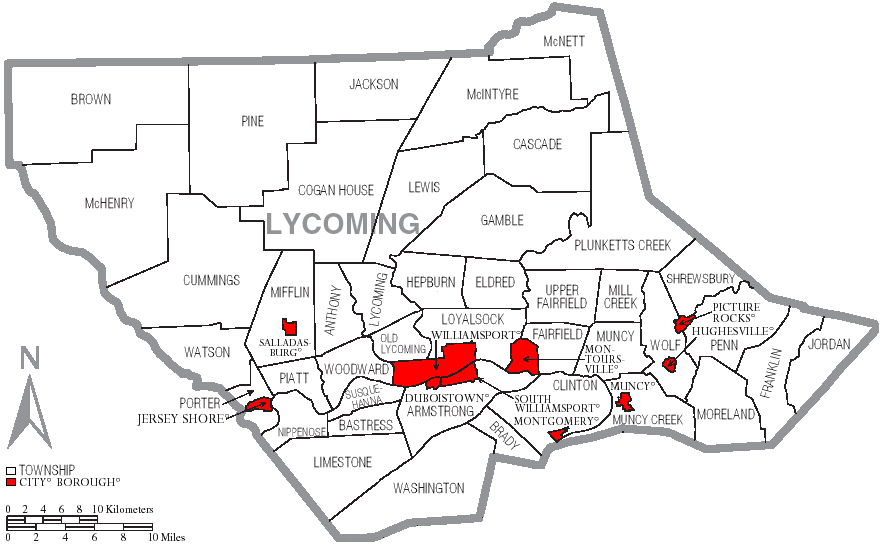
Map of Lycoming County, Pennsylvania with Municipal Labels showing Cities and Boroughs (red), Townships (white), and Census-designated places (blue).

This is a list of villages in Lycoming County, Pennsylvania in the United States. As of 2007, Lycoming County has fifty-two incorporated municipalities: one city, nine boroughs, and forty-two townships. Thirty-two of Lycoming County's townships have a total of fifty villages and one has a census-designated place (CDP). Villages are marked with signs by the Pennsylvania Department of Transportation, which defines them as "unincorporated built-up areas which have a post office or a generally recognized name". CDPs are geographical areas designated by the U.S. Census Bureau to compile demographic data. Neither CDPs nor villages are actual jurisdictions under Pennsylvania law and their territory is legally part of the township(s) they are located in.

In the 2000 census, the population of Lycoming County was 120,044, making it a "Fifth Class County" (defined as "having a population of 95,000 and more, but less than 145,000 inhabitants"). It is included in the Williamsport, Pennsylvania Metropolitan Statistical Area, and its county seat is Williamsport. Lycoming County is located in north central Pennsylvania, about 130 miles (209 km) northwest of Philadelphia and 165 miles (266 km) east-northeast of Pittsburgh, as the crow flies. At 1,244 square miles (3,221 km²) as of 2007, Lycoming County is the largest county by land area in Pennsylvania (Erie County is larger, but nearly half of its area is in Lake Erie). Lycoming County is also larger than Rhode Island, the smallest U.S. state that has an area of 1,214 square miles (3,144 km²).

Location of Lycoming County within Pennsylvania

== Villages ==
- Armstrong Township (includes the villages of Allens and Sylvan Dell)
- Bastress Township (includes the village of Bastress)
- Brady Township (includes the village of Maple Hill)
- Brown Township (includes the villages of Beulah Land, Cedar Run, Hillborn, Pump Station, and Slate Run)
- Cascade Township (includes the villages of Kellyburg, Masten, and Wallis Run)
- Cogan House Township (includes the villages of Beech Grove, Brookside, Cogan House, Steam Valley, Steuben, and White Pine)
- Cummings Township (includes the villages of Ramsey and Waterville)
- Eldred Township (includes the village of Warrensville)
- Fairfield Township (includes the village of Bella Vista
- Franklin Township (includes the villages of Lairdsville and North Mountain)
- Gamble Township (includes the village of Calvert)
- Hepburn Township (includes the villages of Balls Mills, Cogan Station, Haleeka, and Hepburnville)
- Jackson Township (includes the villages of Buttonwood and Jackson Corners)
- Jordan Township (includes the villages of Biggertown, Lungerville, Richarts Grove, and Unityville)
- Lewis Township (includes the villages of Bodines, Grays Run, Powys, and Trout Run
- Limestone Township (includes the villages of Collomsville and Oriole, and the villages and CDPs of Oval and Rauchtown (also in Crawford Township, Clinton County)
- Loyalsock Township (includes the CDPs and villages of Faxon and Kenmar)
- Lycoming Township (includes the villages of Oak Lynn (also in Old Lycoming Township), Perryville, and Quiggleville)
- McHenry Township (includes the villages of Bluestone, Cammal, Haneyville, Jersey Mills, Okome, and Ross)
- McIntyre Township (includes the villages of Langdon, Marsh Hill, and Ralston)
- McNett Township (includes the villages of Chemung, Ellenton, Leolyn, and Yorktown)
- Mill Creek Township (includes part of the village of Huntersville (also in Wolf Township))
- Moreland Township (includes the villages of Moreland and Opp
- Muncy Township (includes the village of Pennsdale
- Muncy Creek Township (includes the village of Clarkstown)
- Nippenose Township (includes the village of Antes Fort)
- Old Lycoming Township (includes the CDP and village of Garden View and villages of Grimesville and Oak Lynn (also in Lycoming Township))
- Penn Township (includes the villages of Beaver Lake and Strawbridge)
- Piatt Township (includes the villages of Larrys Creek and Larryville)
- Pine Township (includes the villages of Carsontown, English Center, Lorenton, Oregon Hill, and Texas)
- Plunketts Creek Township (includes the villages of Barbours, Dunwoody Camp, Hoppestown, and Proctor)
- Shrewsbury Township (includes the villages of Camp Genesee, Glen Mawr, and Tivoli)
- Susquehanna Township (includes the village of Nisbet)
- Upper Fairfield Township (includes the villages of Fairfield Center, Farragut, and Loyalsockville)
- Washington Township (includes the villages of Elimsport and Texas Village)
- Watson Township (includes the villages of Spring Corners (partly in Gallagher Township, Clinton County) and Tomb)
- Wolf Township (includes the village of Bryan Mills and part of the village of Huntersville (also in Mill Creek Township))
- Woodward Township (includes the villages of Linden and Pine Run)

Four townships in Lycoming County do not include any villages, including Anthony, Clinton, Mifflin, and Porter.

== See also ==
- History of Lycoming County, Pennsylvania
- List of municipalities in Lycoming County, Pennsylvania
