= Lycoming Township, Pennsylvania =

Township in Pennsylvania, US

Lycoming Township, Lycoming County, Pennsylvania
- Township
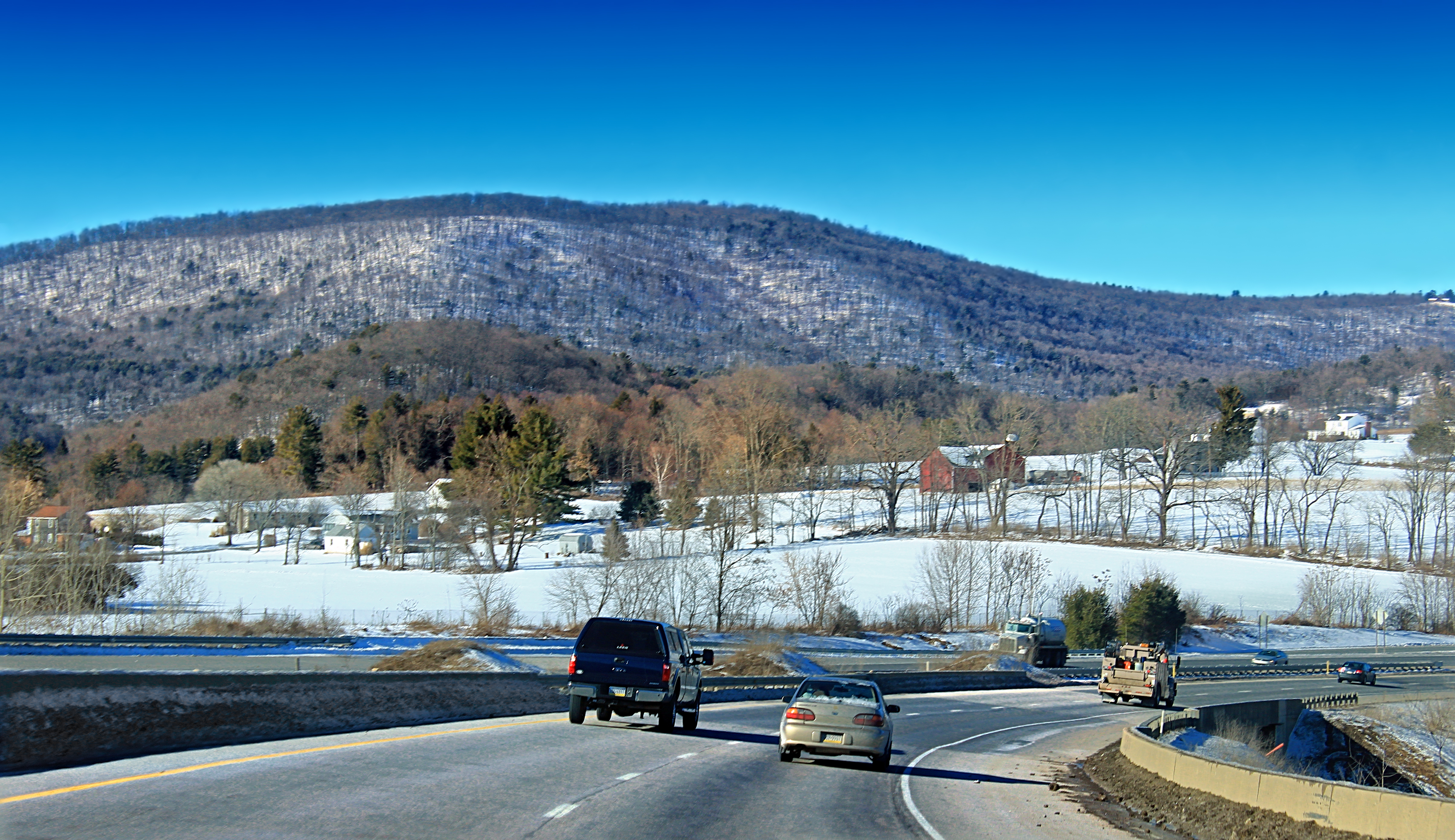
- Scenery of Lycoming Township from US 15

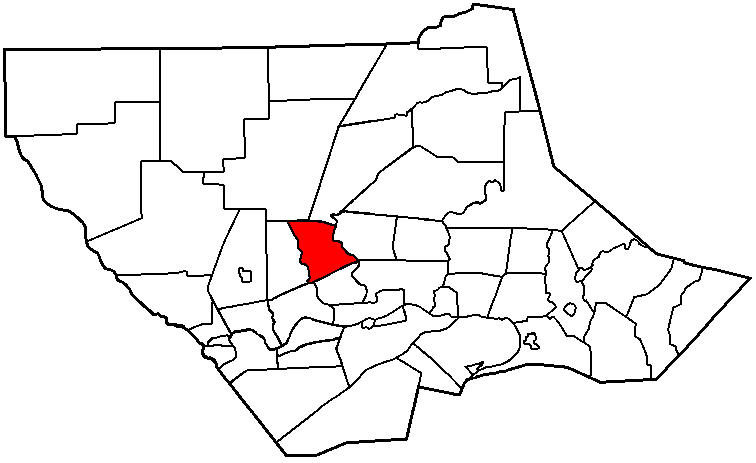
- Map of Lycoming County, Pennsylvania highlighting Lycoming Township

- Map of Lycoming County, Pennsylvania
- Coordinates: 41°18′43″N 77°5′32″W
- Country: United States
- State: Pennsylvania
- County: Lycoming
- Settled: 1773
- Incorporated: 1858

Area
  - Total: 15.28 sq mi (39.58 km^{2})
  - Land: 15.18 sq mi (39.32 km^{2})
  - Water: 0.10 sq mi (0.27 km^{2})
- Elevation: 758 ft (231 m)

Population (2020)
  - Total: 1,490 ▲
  - Estimate (2021): 1,488
  - Density: 97.4/sq mi (37.59/km^{2})
- Time zone: UTC-5 (Eastern (EST))
  - Summer (DST): UTC-4 (EDT)
- ZIP code: 17728
- Area code: 570
- FIPS code: 42-081-45584
- GNIS feature ID: 1216756

Lycoming Township is a township in Lycoming County, Pennsylvania, United States. The population was 1,490 at the 2020 census. It is part of the Williamsport Metropolitan Statistical Area.

== History ==
Lycoming Township was formed from part of Old Lycoming Township. A petition from the residents of the northern part of what was Lycoming Township was submitted on April 26, 1858. The petition asked that Lycoming Township be divided into northern and southern portions. A vote held in the Newberry section of Williamsport agreed with the petitioners. A judge decreed that the northern portion be called "Lycoming Township" and the southern part be named "Old Lycoming Township" on December 2, 1858. The dividing line begins where Beautys Run flows into Lycoming Creek and follows a line of southwestward to Woodward and Anthony townships.

== Geography ==
Lycoming Township is in central Lycoming County and is bordered by Cogan House and Lewis townships to the north, Hepburn Township to the east, across Lycoming Creek, Loyalsock Township to the southeast, Old Lycoming Township to the south, Woodward Township to the southwest, and Anthony Township to the west.

U.S. Route 15, the Appalachian Thruway, passes through the eastern side of the township, following the Lycoming Creek valley. Access is from Exit 140 (Beautys Run Road) and partial Exit 143 (Pennsylvania Route 973). US-15 leads south 8 miles (13 km) to Williamsport, the county seat, and north 40 miles (64 km) to Mansfield. PA-973 leads east 9 miles (14 km) to Warrensville and west the same distance to Salladasburg. Unincorporated communities within Lycoming Township are in the Lycoming Creek valley. From south to north, these are: Fairlawn, Perryville, and Quiggleville (a short distance up the valley of Hoagland Run).

According to the United States Census Bureau, the township has a total area of 15.3 square miles (39.6 km^{2}), of which 15.2 square miles (39.3 km^{2}) are land and 0.1 square miles (0.3 km^{2}), or 0.67%, are water. The entire township is within the watershed of Lycoming Creek, which flows south to the West Branch Susquehanna River at Williamsport.

== Demographics ==
Historical population
Census	Pop.	Note	%±
2010	1,478		—
2020	1,490		0.8%
2021 (est.)	1,488		−0.1%
U.S. Decennial Census

As of the census of 2000, there were 1,606 people, 614 households, and 469 families residing in the township. The population density was 105.3 inhabitants per square mile (40.7/km^{2}). There were 658 housing units at an average density of 43.2 per square mile (16.7/km^{2}). The racial makeup of the township was 97.88% White, 0.37% African American, 0.06% Native American, 0.31% Asian, and 1.37% from two or more races. Hispanic or Latino of any race were 0.12% of the population.

There were 614 households, out of which 33.6% had children under the age of 18 living with them, 62.2% were married couples living together, 9.1% had a female householder with no husband present, and 23.5% were non-families. 19.1% of all households were made up of individuals, and 7.0% had someone living alone who was 65 years of age or older. The average household size was 2.62 and the average family size was 2.95.

In the township the population was spread out, with 25.0% under the age of 18, 6.6% from 18 to 24, 27.9% from 25 to 44, 28.0% from 45 to 64, and 12.6% who were 65 years of age or older. The median age was 40 years. For every 100 females there were 100.8 males. For every 100 females age 18 and over, there were 97.2 males.

The median income for a household in the township was $37,262, and the median income for a family was $40,524. Males had a median income of $28,611 versus $21,488 for females. The per capita income for the township was $15,395. About 4.7% of families and 7.6% of the population were below the poverty line, including 7.8% of those under age 18 and 15.6% of those age 65 or over.
