= Gamble Township, Lycoming County, Pennsylvania =

Township in Pennsylvania, US

Gamble Township, Pennsylvania
- Township
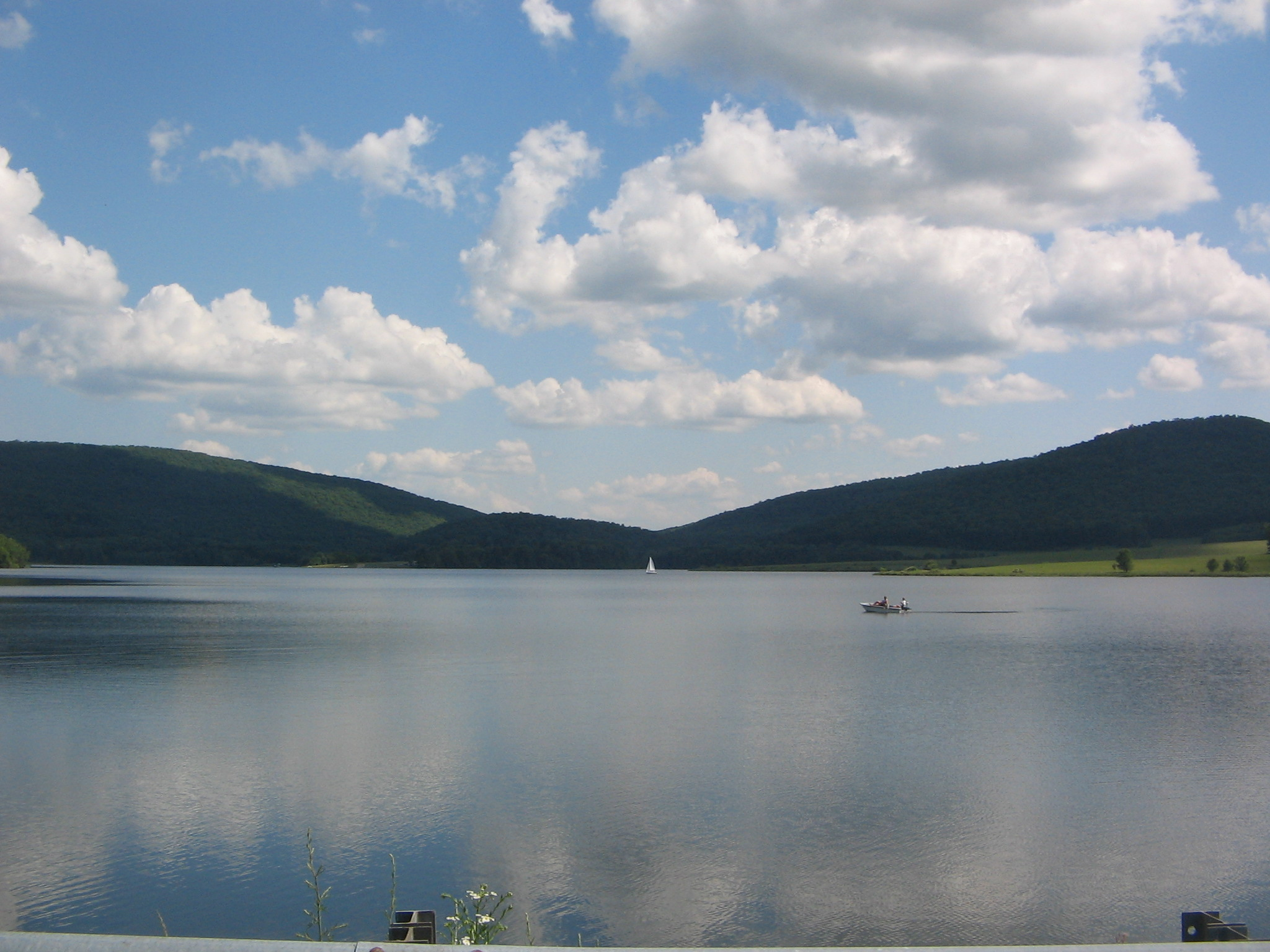
- Rose Valley Lake

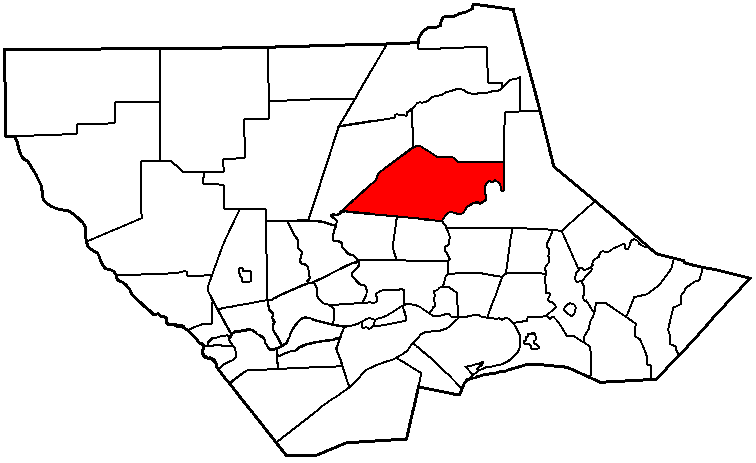
- Map of Lycoming County, Pennsylvania highlighting Gamble Township

- Map of Lycoming County, Pennsylvania
- Coordinates: 41°23′42″N 76°57′27″W
- Country: United States
- State: Pennsylvania
- County: Lycoming
- Settled: 1794
- Formed: 1875

Area
  - Total: 45.78 sq mi (118.56 km^{2})
  - Land: 44.96 sq mi (116.45 km^{2})
  - Water: 0.81 sq mi (2.11 km^{2})
- Elevation: 1,316 ft (401 m)

Population (2020)
  - Total: 780 ▲
  - Estimate (2021): 777
  - Density: 17.0/sq mi (6.57/km^{2})
- Time zone: UTC-5 (Eastern Time Zone (North America))
  - Summer (DST): UTC-4 (EDT)
- ZIP code: 17771
- Area code: 570
- FIPS code: 42-081-28352
- GNIS feature ID: 1216750
- Website: https://gambletownship.org/

Gamble Township is a township in Lycoming County, Pennsylvania, United States. The population was 780 at the 2020 census, up from 756 in 2010. It is part of the Williamsport Metropolitan Statistical Area.

== History ==
Gamble Township was formed from parts of Lewis and Cascade townships on January 30, 1875. An election of the citizens of the proposed township was 152–0 in favor of its creation. The drive for the formation of Gamble Township was led Ira Parker, Abraham Swartz, and J.C. Green. They started a petition and gathered the necessary signatures. Their petition was presented to Judge James Gamble who authorized the election. The results of the balloting were certified by Judge Huston Hepburn. The township is named for the judge who ordered the election.

The first settler in Gamble Township was John Rose, for whom Rose Valley is named. Rose was born in Scotland in 1772. He migrated to the United States in 1794 and settled in what is now Gamble Township. Rose was accompanied to the valley by his first wife and a man named Andrew Tulloh. Rose and Tulloh cleared some land for farming but did not remain in the valley. They both moved to Williamsport in their later years. The departure of John Rose did not bring about the end of agricultural development in Gamble Township. New settlers, a majority of them Germans, continued to clear Rose Valley. Here they established dairy farms and orchards, some of which are thriving today.

Salt mining and the lumbering were the primary industries found in Gamble Township during the mid-to-late 19th century. Several salt mines were built within the township. Thousands of acres of old-growth forest were cleared to meet the demands for lumber during the lumber era that swept throughout Pennsylvania. Williamsport, which is just south of Gamble Township, was known at the "Lumber Capital of the World".

Today Gamble Township is a largely rural area with scattered dairy farms, orchards, and family homes. The population in 2010 was nearly the same as it was at the 1890 census, when the count stood at 754.

== Geography ==
Gamble Township is northeast of the center of Lycoming County and is bordered by Lewis Township to the northwest, Cascade Township to the north, Plunketts Creek Township to the east and southeast, Eldred Township to the south, and Hepburn Township to the southwest. The township is from 12 to 20 miles (19 to 32 km) northeast of Williamsport, the county seat.

According to the United States Census Bureau, the township has a total area of 45.8 square miles (118.6 km^{2}), of which 45.0 square miles (116.5 km^{2}) are land and 0.81 square miles (2.1 km^{2}), or 1.78%, are water. Loyalsock Creek, a southwestward-flowing tributary of the West Branch Susquehanna River, forms the southeastern border of the township. Wallis Run flows through the center of the township, first westward then south, to join the Loyalsock near the southern border of the township. The northwestern edge of the township drains by small streams to Lycoming Creek, another tributary of the West Branch of the Susquehanna.

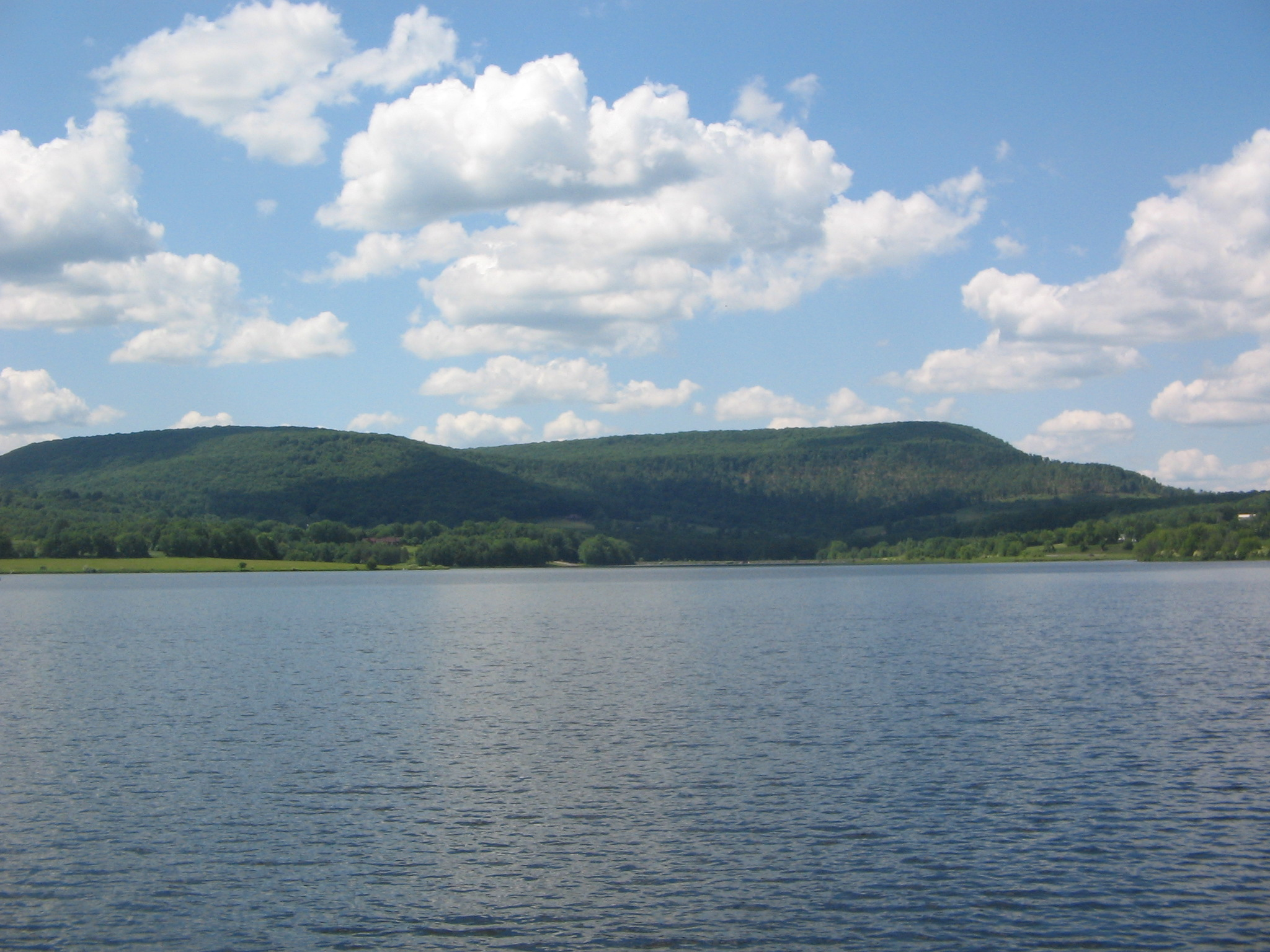
Rose Valley Lake in Gamble Township, looking west across the lake

Rose Valley Lake is a reservoir that covers 389 acres (1.57 km^{2}) in Gamble Township. Its outlet is Mill Creek, which flows south to join Loyalsock Creek near Montoursville. The fish and waters of the lake are managed by the Pennsylvania Fish and Boat Commission. The lake is owned by the Commonwealth of Pennsylvania. Its primary use is recreational game fishing. The lake is open for recreational fishing on a year-round basis. Ice fishing is permitted, but the thickness of the ice is not monitored by the Fish Commission. The most common game species of fish in the lake are: largemouth bass, bluegill, black crappie, muskellunge, yellow perch, chain pickerel, pumpkinseed and walleye. The lake is 5 miles (8 km) east of U.S. Route 15 and Pennsylvania Route 14. It can be reached by taking Trout Run Mountain Road to Rose Valley Mountain Road.

== Demographics ==
Historical population
Census	Pop.	Note	%±
2010	756		—
2020	780		3.2%
2021 (est.)	777		−0.4%
U.S. Decennial Census

As of the census of 2000, there were 854 people, 320 households, and 254 families residing in the township. The population density was 18.8 people per square mile (7.2/km^{2}). There were 382 housing units at an average density of 8.4/sq mi (3.2/km^{2}). The racial makeup of the township was 99.65% White, 0.12% Native American, 0.12% Asian, 0.12% from other races. Hispanic or Latino of any race were 0.12% of the population.

There were 320 households, out of which 29.4% had children under the age of 18 living with them, 70.9% were married couples living together, 5.6% had a female householder with no husband present, and 20.6% were non-families. 17.2% of all households were made up of individuals, and 6.6% had someone living alone who was 65 years of age or older. The average household size was 2.67 and the average family size was 3.02.

In the township the population was spread out, with 22.8% under the age of 18, 7.4% from 18 to 24, 27.6% from 25 to 44, 30.4% from 45 to 64, and 11.7% who were 65 years of age or older. The median age was 41 years. For every 100 females there were 105.8 males. For every 100 females age 18 and over, there were 103.4 males.

The median income for a household in the township was $39,028, and the median income for a family was $42,054. Males had a median income of $31,705 versus $20,000 for females. The per capita income for the township was $18,867. About 8.1% of families and 9.1% of the population were below the poverty line, including 12.6% of those under age 18 and 7.3% of those age 65 or over.
