= Hepburn Township, Lycoming County, Pennsylvania =

Township in Pennsylvania, US

Hepburn Township, Pennsylvania
- Township
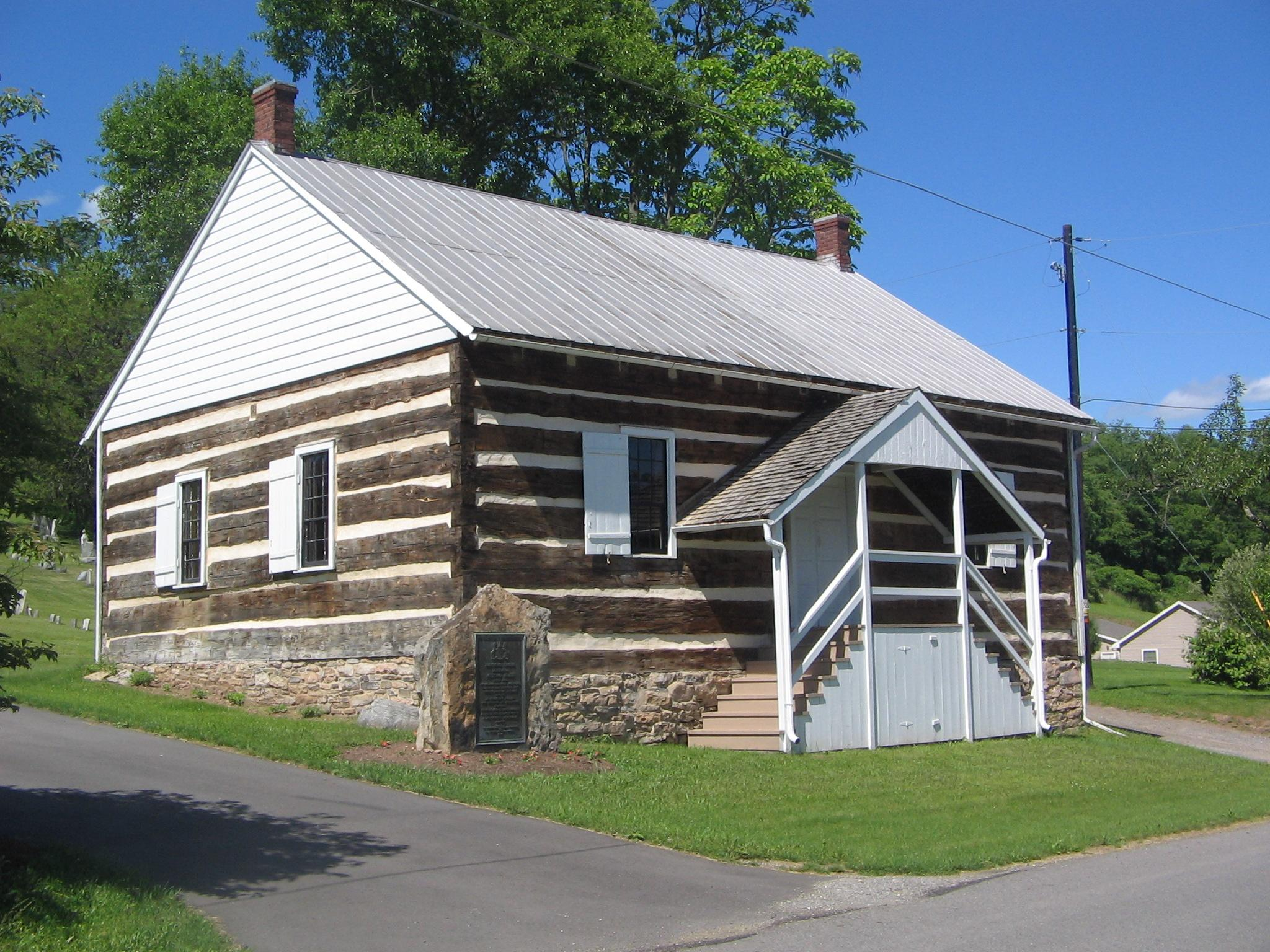
- Blooming Grove Dunkard Church, built ca. 1805

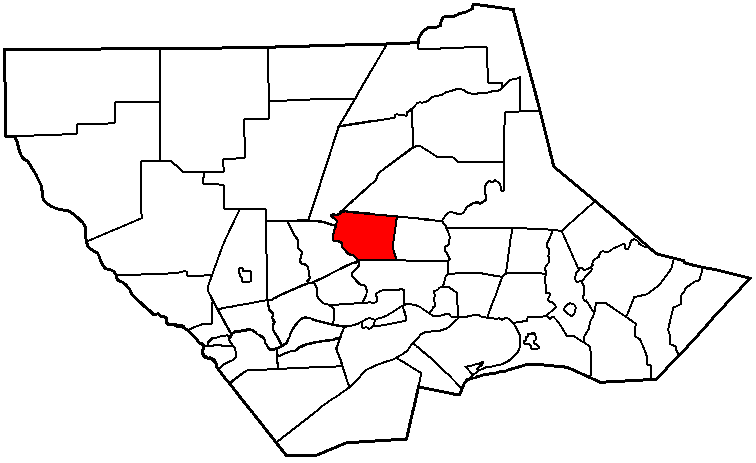
- Map of Lycoming County, Pennsylvania highlighting Hepburn Township

- Map of Lycoming County, Pennsylvania
- Coordinates: 41°18′53″N 77°2′34″W
- Country: United States
- State: Pennsylvania
- County: Lycoming
- Settled: 1784
- Formed: 1804

Government
  - Type: Board of Supervisors
  - Chairman: Joseph Hamm
  - Vice-chairman: Robert Fesemyer Jr.
  - Supervisor: Oscar Schon

Area
  - Total: 16.76 sq mi (43.42 km^{2})
  - Land: 16.67 sq mi (43.17 km^{2})
  - Water: 0.097 sq mi (0.25 km^{2})
- Elevation: 906 ft (276 m)

Population (2020)
  - Total: 2,579
  - Estimate (2021): 2,563
  - Density: 163.2/sq mi (63.01/km^{2})
- Time zone: UTC-5 (Eastern Time Zone (North America))
  - Summer (DST): UTC-4 (EDT)
- ZIP code: 17728
- Area code: 570
- FIPS code: 42-081-33944
- GNIS feature ID: 1216751
- Website: www.hepburntownship.org

Hepburn Township is a township in Lycoming County, Pennsylvania, United States. The population was 2,579 at the 2020 census. It is part of the Williamsport Metropolitan Statistical Area.

== History ==
Hepburn Township was formed from part of Loyalsock Township in 1804. It is named for William Hepburn, a former state senator and one of the founding fathers of Lycoming County and Williamsport, the county's largest city. Hepburn Township was originally much larger in size than it is today. Lewis, Gamble, Eldred, and Cascade townships all are formed from territory that was once part of Hepburn Township.

An Indian village known as Eeltown played a prominent role in the early history of what is now Hepburn Township. This village located on Lycoming Creek near the present village of Hepburnville was an important village on the Sheshequin Path. The Indian name for Eeltown is unknown, but the whites named it for the plentiful eels that could be found in the waters of Lycoming Creek.

Hepburn Township was settled by three distinct groups of European migrants. The western section along Lycoming Creek was largely settled by the Scots-Irish, the middle section known as Blooming Grove was settled by a German religious group, the Dunkard Brethren, and the eastern section of the township was settled by the Quakers. John and Gottlieb Heim were among the first Dunkards to settle in Hepburn Township. The Heims were imprisoned in Württemberg, Germany, as conscientious objectors. A condition of their release from prison was that they would agree to leave Germany forever. Upon their release John and Gottleig moved to the United States. They settled in Lycoming County and founded a religious community and village known as Blooming Grove. Soon other Dunkards from Germany joined the Heim brothers. They built log cabins and quickly cleared the land for farming. In addition to clearing the land, the Dunkards were also free to worship God in a manner that they saw fit. Their faith was banned in Germany. The newly arrived settlers worked hard to clear the land and credited their success on their faith in God. The new farms prospered almost immediately; they "bloomed like flowers", hence the name "Blooming Grove".

Balls Mills is a village in Hepburn Township. It is named for John Ball who migrated from England to the United States in 1893. He settled in Hillsgrove Township in Sullivan County. There he built a sawmill and was beginning to have success when he drowned while bathing. His son, William, then moved west to Hepburn Township and founded Balls Mills in 1818. He built a fulling mill soon after building his home. The Ball family quickly had success and expanded their milling operations to include a clover mill. The machinery at the clover mill was able to clean clover seed. Clover seed was very expensive at the time; a bushel of the seed sold for as much as $24.00. Clover was very important to farmers for providing ground cover and as a food supply for their grazing dairy cows. The Ball family also built a sawmill, a woolen mill, and a grain cradle manufacturing operation. A cradle is attached to a scythe to gather the harvested grains. The cradles were sold not just in Lycoming County but throughout the United States. The first major shipment to the West arrived in St. Louis, Missouri, in 1866.

== Geography ==
Hepburn Township is at the geographic center of Lycoming County and is bordered by Gamble Township to the north, Eldred Township to the east and Loyalsock Township to the south. The western border with Lewis and Lycoming townships is formed by Lycoming Creek.

According to the United States Census Bureau, the township has a total area of 16.8 square miles (43.4 km^{2}), of which 0.10 square miles (0.25 km^{2}), or 0.58%, are water. The township drains west to Lycoming Creek, which flows south to the West Branch Susquehanna River at Williamsport. The township's unincorporated communities include Balls Mills, Cogan Station, Haleeka, Hepburn Heights, Hepburnville, and Powys (also in Lewis Township.) Its northern boundary area is on Jacoby Mountain. Route 973 crosses the township east-to-west and interchanges with U.S. Route 15 just across the Lycoming Creek from Cogan Station. Other local roads of note include Blooming Grove Road, Lycoming Creek Road (the old 15,) Pleasant Hill Road/Pleasant Valley Road, Rose Valley Road, and Smokey Corner Road.

== Demographics ==
Historical population
Census	Pop.	Note	%±
2010	2,762		—
2020	2,579		−6.6%
2021 (est.)	2,563		−0.6%
U.S. Decennial Census

As of the census of 2000, there were 2,836 people, 1,082 households, and 840 families residing in the township. The population density was 170.4 inhabitants per square mile (65.8/km^{2}). There were 1,138 housing units at an average density of 68.4 per square mile (26.4/km^{2}). The racial makeup of the township was 98.77% White, 0.35% African American, 0.07% Native American, 0.42% Asian, and 0.39% from two or more races. Hispanic or Latino of any race were 0.21% of the population.

There were 1,082 households, out of which 34.4% had children under the age of 18 living with them, 66.7% were married couples living together, 6.4% had a female householder with no husband present, and 22.3% were non-families. 18.1% of all households were made up of individuals, and 7.1% had someone living alone who was 65 years of age or older. The average household size was 2.62 and the average family size was 2.98.

In the township the population was spread out, with 25.5% under the age of 18, 6.4% from 18 to 24, 26.6% from 25 to 44, 28.5% from 45 to 64, and 13.0% who were 65 years of age or older. The median age was 41 years. For every 100 females there were 99.6 males. For every 100 females age 18 and over, there were 99.8 males.

The median income for a household in the township was $42,202, and the median income for a family was $46,932. Males had a median income of $36,118 versus $22,156 for females. The per capita income for the township was $20,044. About 8.5% of families and 8.7% of the population were below the poverty line, including 10.2% of those under age 18 and 12.3% of those age 65 or over.
