= Rose Valley Lake (Pennsylvania) =

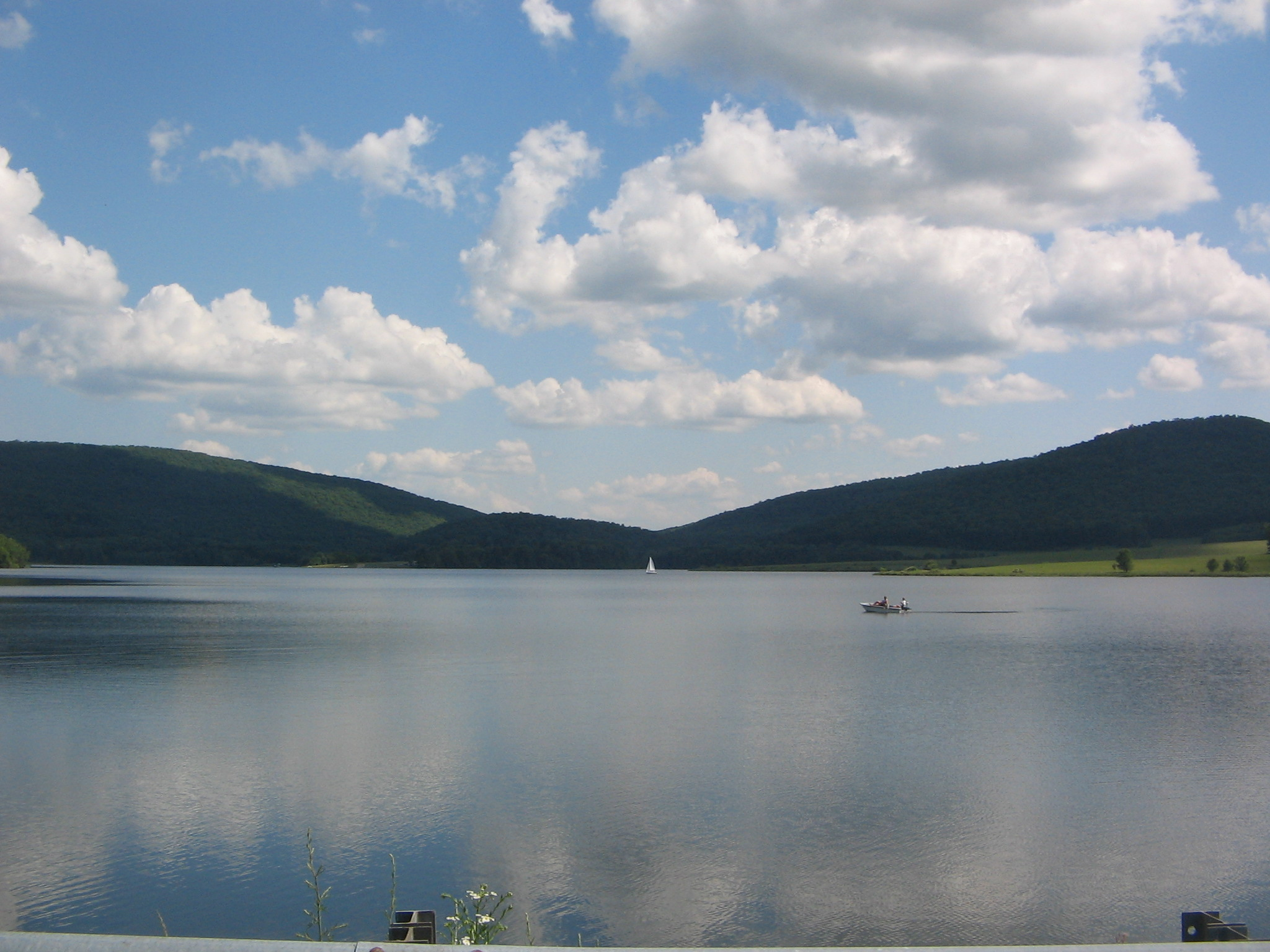
- Rose Valley Lake, looking south from the bridge

- Location within Pennsylvania Location within the United States
- Location: Gamble Township, Lycoming County, Pennsylvania
- Coordinates: 41°23′19″N 76°59′31″W
- Type: reservoir
- Basin countries: United States
- Surface area: 389 acres (1.57 km^{2})
- Surface elevation: 1,234 ft (376 m)

Rose Valley Lake (also known as Hall Pond) is a reservoir that covers 389 acres (1.57 km^{2}) in Gamble Township, Lycoming County, Pennsylvania, in the United States. The fish and waters of the lake are managed by the Pennsylvania Fish and Boat Commission.

The 360 acres (150 ha)(approx.) artificial lake is owned by the Commonwealth of Pennsylvania, and was given its name, "Rose Valley Lake," in May 1973 by the Pennsylvania Fish Commission, following approval by the commonwealth's Geographic Names Committee.

== History ==
Created by the Pennsylvania Fish Commission, via the construction of a twenty-five-foot-high, four-hundred-and-ten-foot-long earthen dam on Mill Creek in Lycoming County, Pennsylvania, Rose Valley Lake is a 360 acres (150 ha) approx artificial body of water that is situated on approx 626 acres (253 ha) of land that were originally purchased by the commission for $219,575, using Project 70 funding. In addition to creation of the new lake, the commission also built three boat-launching areas with comfort stations and parking lots. The commission officially dedicated the lake on Sunday, June 24, 1970.

== Features ==
The primary use of Rose Valley Lake is recreational game fishing. The lake is open for recreational fishing on a year-round basis. Ice fishing is permitted, but the thickness of the ice is not monitored by the Fish Commission.

The most common game species of fish in the lake are, largemouth bass, bluegill, black crappie, muskellunge, yellow perch, chain pickerel, pumpkinseed and walleye. The lake is five miles east of U.S. Route 15 and Pennsylvania Route 14.

Rose Valley Lake may be reached by taking Trout Run Mountain Road to Rose Valley Road.

== See also ==
- Rose Valley, in Delaware County, Pennsylvania
