= Balls Mills, Pennsylvania =

Unincorporated community in Pennsylvania, US

Coordinates: 41°19′05″N 77°01′37″W

Balls Mills is an unincorporated community on Route 973 in Hepburn Township, Lycoming County, Pennsylvania. It is located seven miles north of Williamsport on Mill Creek, which flows southwest into the Lycoming Creek. English immigrant John Ball founded a saw mill in the village in the 1790s and, after he drowned, his son Bill Ball opened a wool mill and named the place Balls Mills with the apostrophe omitted. Bloomingrove Road provides access to Williamsport, where it becomes Market Street. The village uses the Cogan Station zip code of 17728.
