= Eldred Township, Lycoming County, Pennsylvania =

Township in Pennsylvania, US

- Township
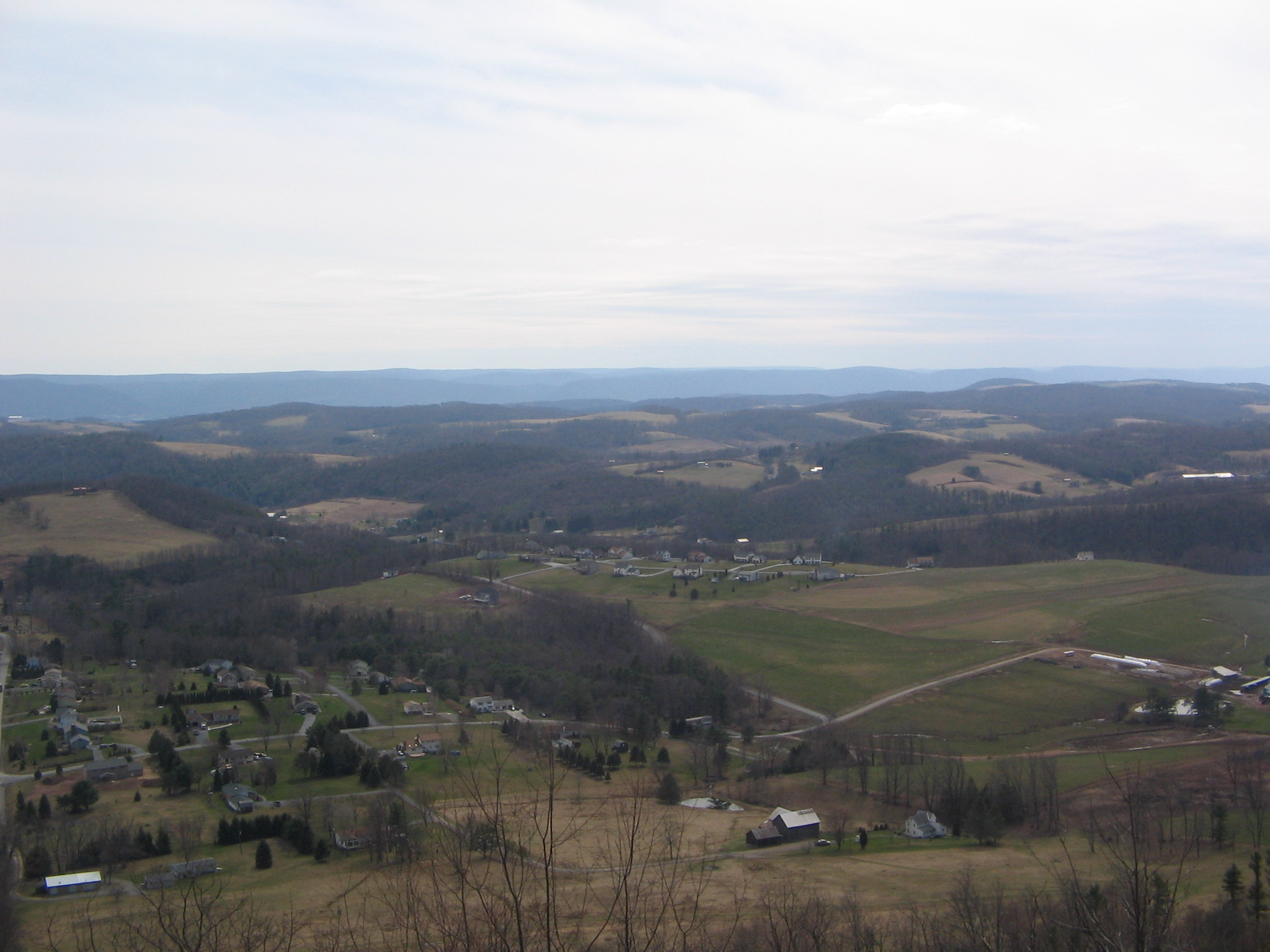
- Eldred Township from the Katy Jane Trail at Rider Park

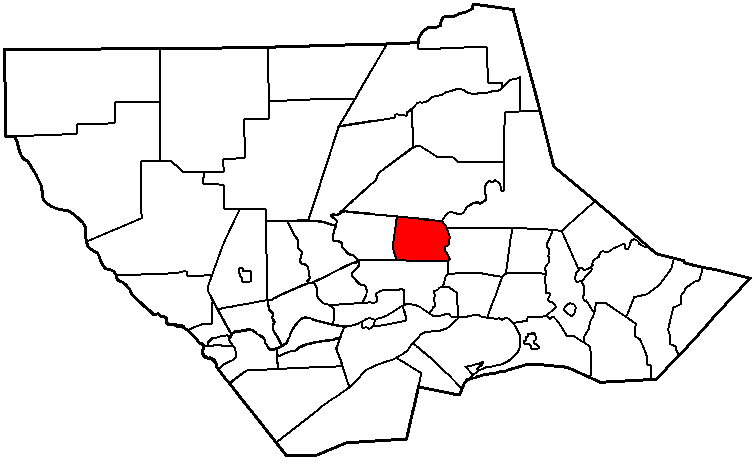
- Map of Lycoming County, Pennsylvania highlighting Eldred Township

- Map of Lycoming County, Pennsylvania
- Coordinates: 41°19′27″N 76°57′47″W
- Country: United States
- State: Pennsylvania
- County: Lycoming
- Settled (Warrensville): 1802
- Formed: 1858

Area
  - Total: 14.34 sq mi (37.15 km^{2})
  - Land: 14.23 sq mi (36.86 km^{2})
  - Water: 0.11 sq mi (0.28 km^{2})
- Elevation: 915 ft (279 m)

Population (2020)
  - Total: 1,996
  - Estimate (2021): 1,981
  - Density: 151.9/sq mi (58.65/km^{2})
- Time zone: UTC-5 (Eastern Time Zone (North America))
  - Summer (DST): UTC-4 (EDT)
- FIPS code: 42-081-22880
- GNIS feature ID: 1216747
- Website: eldredtownship.org

Eldred Township is a township in Lycoming County, Pennsylvania, United States. The population was 1,996 at the 2020 census. It is part of the Williamsport Metropolitan Statistical Area. The unincorporated village of Warrensville is located in Eldred Township.

== History ==
=== Formation and early settlement ===
Eldred Township is one of the smallest townships in Lycoming County. A petition was filed proposing the formation of the new township from Hepburn Township in 1858. The court directed an election to be held at Warrensville on October 12, 1858. The question of division was hotly contested, resulting in 109 votes for to 91 against the proposition. On the November 16, 1858, Judge Jordan made a decree erecting the township, and it was named Eldred, in honor of C. D. Eldred, who was then an associate on the bench.

The first white settlers in Eldred Township were mostly Quakers, attracted by the land speculations of Robert Morris, and others in Muncy Township. Among these settlers were the Winners, Wilsons, and Marshalls. The neighborhood of their settlement is now known by the title of "Quaker Hill".

In 1892, in the northern part of the township, David Kiess & Brother owned and ran a sawmill. J. W. Milnor Sr. also had one in the same section, and in the southeastern part of the township there was one run by C. D. Heim. All these mills were located on and fed by Mill Creek. There were two gristmills in Warrensville: one, owned by J. K. Crawford, was run by water; the other, owned by C. Aderhold, had steam and water both.

=== Warrensville ===
Warrensville is the only village in the township. In 1842, when there was talk of applying for a post office, several persons met in the store of John Hoffman, on Mill Creek, and the question of a name came up. "Warrensville", in honor of General Joseph Warren, was proposed, while others suggested "Livingston". A vote was taken and Warrensville carried. The post office was established July 25, 1842, named Warrensville, and Samuel Torbert was appointed postmaster.

The land on which Warrensville stands was cleared in 1802 by Samuel Carpenter. He erected a grist and saw mill and carding machine, which were the first improvements of the kind in the settlement. They proved of great service to the early settlers. These original works have long since passed out of existence. The village of Warrensville was laid out in 1841 by John Weisel, but never has been incorporated.

In 1892 it contained two stores and one Temperance Hotel, kept by Isaac M. Else, as well as a tannery, carried on by E. W. Lundy, two wagon makers and two blacksmith shops.

== Geography ==
Eldred Township is in central Lycoming County and is bordered by Hepburn Township to the west, Gamble Township to the north, Plunketts Creek Township to the northeast, Upper Fairfield Township to the east, and Loyalsock Township to the south. Loyalsock Creek, a southward-flowing tributary of the West Branch Susquehanna River, forms the eastern boundary of the township.

According to the United States Census Bureau, the township has a total area of 14.3 square miles (37.1 km^{2}), of which 14.2 square miles (36.9 km^{2}) are land and 0.1 square miles (0.3 km^{2}), or 0.77% are water. The eastern side of the township is drained directly by Loyalsock Creek, while the center is drained by Mill Creek, which flows south to join the Loyalsock, approximately 1 mile (1.6 km) above Montoursville. The tributaries of Mill Creek are Sugarcamp Run at the northern border of the township, Calebs Run in the northeastern part, and Lick Run in the southern part. The southwestern part of the township is drained by Millers Run, a direct tributary of the West Branch, while the extreme western part of the township is drained by a second Mill Creek, which flows west to Lycoming Creek and thence to the West Branch.

== Demographics ==
Historical population
Census	Pop.	Note	%±
2010	2,122		—
2020	1,996		−5.9%
2021 (est.)	1,981		−0.8%
U.S. Decennial Census

As of the census of 2000, there were 2,178 people, 770 households, and 646 families residing in the township. The population density was 152.1 inhabitants per square mile (58.7/km^{2}). There were 798 housing units at an average density of 55.7 per square mile (21.5/km^{2}). The racial makeup of the township was 98.67% White, 0.37% African American, 0.05% Native American, 0.37% Asian, 0.14% from other races, and 0.41% from two or more races. Hispanic or Latino of any race were 0.18% of the population.

There were 770 households, out of which 39.5% had children under the age of 18 living with them, 75.5% were married couples living together, 5.3% had a female householder with no husband present, and 16.0% were non-families. 13.9% of all households were made up of individuals, and 5.7% had someone living alone who was 65 years of age or older. The average household size was 2.83 and the average family size was 3.12.

In the township the population was spread out, with 27.0% under the age of 18, 7.0% from 18 to 24, 27.4% from 25 to 44, 29.2% from 45 to 64, and 9.4% who were 65 years of age or older. The median age was 39 years. For every 100 females there were 101.7 males. For every 100 females age 18 and over, there were 99.5 males.

The median income for a household in the township was $46,780, and the median income for a family was $49,208. Males had a median income of $36,111 versus $21,949 for females. The per capita income for the township was $19,426. About 4.5% of families and 5.1% of the population were below the poverty line, including 7.2% of those under age 18 and 7.5% of those age 65 or over.

== Notable people ==
- Horace Willson (1878-1967), founder and president of Columbia Phonograph Co., later Columbia Records, and father of Hollywood agent Henry Willson, was born in Eldred Township and lived there as a child before his family moved to Williamsport.
