= Linden, Pennsylvania =

Unincorporated community in Pennsylvania, US

- Unincorporated community
- Location within Pennsylvania Location within the United States
- Coordinates: 41°13′51″N 77°08′22″W
- Country: United States
- State: Pennsylvania
- County: Lycoming
- Township: Woodward
- Elevation: 551 ft (168 m)
- Time zone: UTC-5 (Eastern (EST))
  - Summer (DST): UTC-4 (EDT)
- ZIP code: 17744
- Area codes: 272 & 570
- GNIS feature ID: 1179406

Linden is an unincorporated community in Woodward Township, Lycoming County, Pennsylvania, United States. The community is located along U.S. Route 220, 7.2 miles (11.6 km) west of downtown Williamsport. Linden has a post office with ZIP code 17744, which opened on April 18, 1832.
