= Mill Creek (Loyalsock Creek tributary) =

Coordinates: 41.233897°N 76.940426°W

Mill Creek is the name of four different tributaries of Loyalsock Creek in Lycoming and Sullivan counties in Pennsylvania in the United States. There are two more streams named "Mill Creek" in the Loyalsock Creek drainage basin and one named "Mill Run".

== See also ==
- List of rivers of Pennsylvania
