= Cascade Township, Pennsylvania =

Township in Pennsylvania, US

- Township
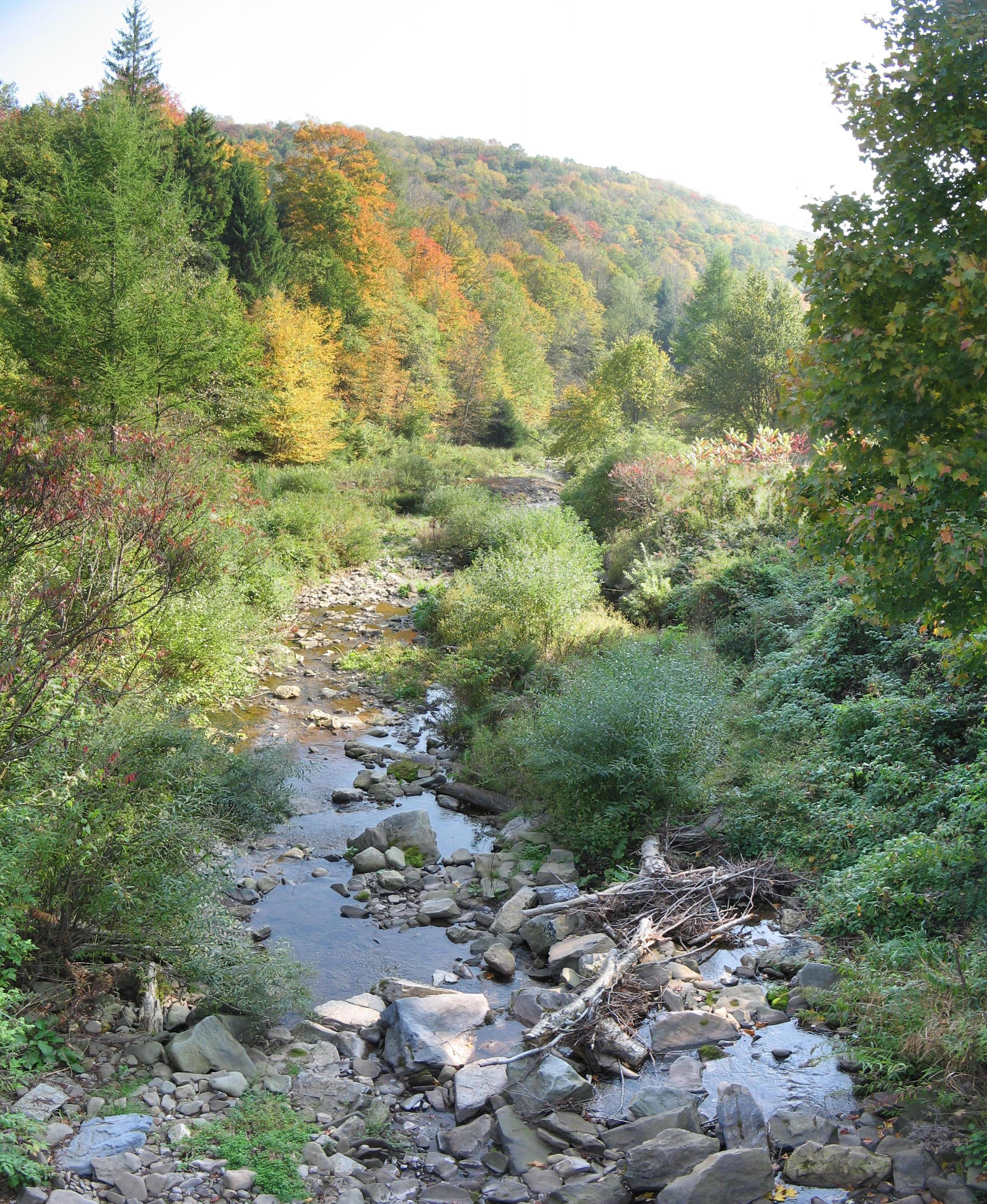
- Pleasant Stream, near the ghost town of Masten, forms the border between McNett (left) and Cascade (right) townships.

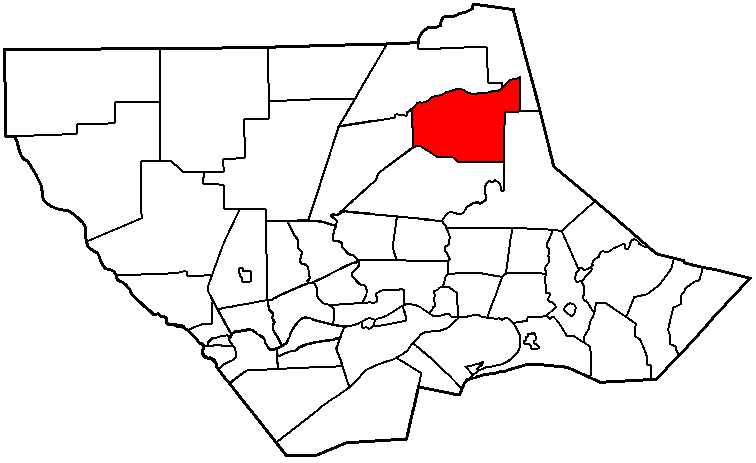
- Map of Lycoming County, Pennsylvania highlighting Cascade Township

- Map of Lycoming County, Pennsylvania
- Coordinates: 41°28′0″N 76°52′19″W
- Country: United States
- State: Pennsylvania
- County: Lycoming
- Formed: 1843

Area
  - Total: 39.53 sq mi (102.37 km^{2})
  - Land: 39.20 sq mi (101.54 km^{2})
  - Water: 0.32 sq mi (0.83 km^{2})
- Elevation: 1,352 ft (412 m)

Population (2020)
  - Total: 420 ▲
  - Estimate (2021): 417
  - Density: 10/sq mi (4/km^{2})
- Time zone: UTC-5 (Eastern Time Zone (North America))
  - Summer (DST): UTC-4 (EDT)
- ZIP code: 17771
- Area code: 570
- FIPS code: 42-081-11560
- GNIS feature ID: 1216743
- Website: www.cascade-township-pa.org

Cascade Township is a township in Lycoming County, Pennsylvania, United States. The population was 420 at the 2020 census. It is part of the Williamsport, Pennsylvania Metropolitan Statistical Area.

== History ==
Cascade Township was formed from parts of Hepburn and Plunketts Creek townships on August 9, 1843. It is named for the series of waterfalls or cascades that are abundant in the many mountain streams of Cascade Township.

Many of the early settlers in Cascade Township were Irish Catholics. Under the leadership of Michael Kelly they established the village of Kellyburg in one of the most remote parts of Lycoming County. Michael Kelly also cut a road deep into Cascade Township from a sawmill along Lycoming Creek, and he built a gristmill and a sawmill in the township. Kelly left the area in 1877 following a bitter defeat in the sheriff election of 1872, moving to Kansas and residing there until his 1883 death. Kelly also helped his fellow Catholics establish the mission parish of St. Mary's.

== Geography ==
Cascade Township is in northeastern Lycoming County and is bordered by McIntyre Township to the north, McNett Township to the north and east, Plunketts Creek Township to the east, Gamble Township to the south, and Lewis Township to the west. The closest state highway is Pennsylvania Route 14, which follows the valley of Lycoming Creek less than one mile west of the township border. Williamsport, the Lycoming county seat, is 20 miles (32 km) to the south.

According to the United States Census Bureau, the township has a total area of 39.5 square miles (102.4 km^{2}), of which 39.2 square miles (101.5 km^{2}) are land and 0.3 square miles (0.8 km^{2}), or 0.81%, are water. The northern part of the township drains to Pleasant Stream, which flows west to join Lycoming Creek at Marsh Hill in McIntyre Township. The westernmost part of the township drains directly to Lycoming Creek via Slacks Run. The remainder of the township drains southward via several streams to Wallis Run, a southerly-flowing tributary of Loyalsock Creek. Lycoming and Loyalsock creeks both flow south to the West Branch Susquehanna River in the southern part of the county. Burnetts Ridge, rising to elevations of 2,075 to 2,150 feet (632 to 655 m), runs east–west through the center of the township, separating the Pleasant Stream and Wallis Run drainages.

== Demographics ==
Historical population
Census	Pop.	Note	%±
2010	413		—
2020	420		1.7%
2021 (est.)	417		−0.7%
U.S. Decennial Census

As of the census of 2000, there were 419 people, 172 households, and 130 families residing in the township. The population density was 10.2 people per square mile (4.0/km^{2}). There were 245 housing units at an average density of 6.0/sq mi (2.3/km^{2}). The racial makeup of the township was 98.81% White, 0.72% Native American and 0.48% Asian. Hispanic or Latino of any race were 0.72% of the population.

There were 172 households, out of which 25.0% had children under the age of 18 living with them, 66.3% were married couples living together, 6.4% had a female householder with no husband present, and 24.4% were non-families. 18.6% of all households were made up of individuals, and 7.0% had someone living alone who was 65 years of age or older. The average household size was 2.44 and the average family size was 2.78.

In the township the population was spread out, with 21.5% under the age of 18, 4.5% from 18 to 24, 29.4% from 25 to 44, 26.3% from 45 to 64, and 18.4% who were 65 years of age or older. The median age was 43 years. For every 100 females, there were 106.4 males. For every 100 females age 18 and over, there were 101.8 males.

The median income for a household in the township was $39,896, and the median income for a family was $45,208. Males had a median income of $31,000 versus $22,813 for females. The per capita income for the township was $19,465. About 5.1% of families and 8.6% of the population were below the poverty line, including 4.5% of those under age 18 and 15.5% of those age 65 or over.
