= Susquehanna and Eagles Mere Railroad =

Early 1900s railroad in northeast Pennsylvania

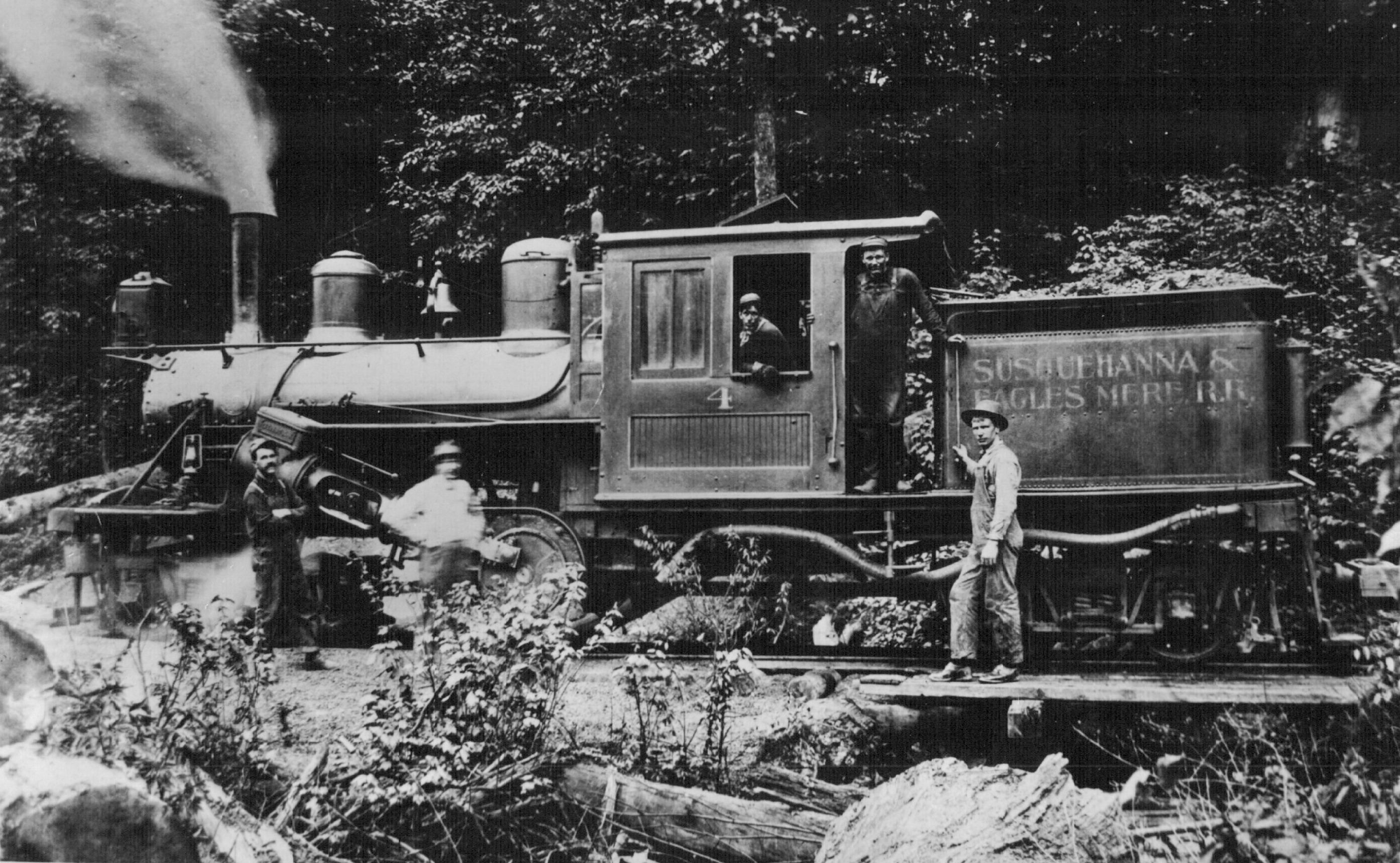
- Susquehanna and Eagles Mere Railroad

Overview
- Headquarters: Masten
- Locale: Sullivan and Lycoming Counties in Pennsylvania
- Dates of operation: 1902–1930

Technical
- Track gauge: 3 ft (914 mm)
- Length: 23.5 miles (37.8 km)

The Susquehanna and Eagles Mere Railroad was a logging railroad operating from 1902 to 1930 in Sullivan and Lycoming Counties in Pennsylvania in the United States.

The railroad was originally built from the Eagles Mere Railroad near Eagles Mere 3.5 miles (5.6 km) to the lumber mill at Sonesville on Kettle Creek. Because the Eagles Mere Railroad was a 3 ft (914 mm) narrow gauge, the Susquehanna and Eagles Mere Railroad was built to a 3 ft (914 mm) gauge as well. The line was extended in 1904 down Kettle Creek to Ogdonia, then along Loyalsock Creek to the village of Hillsgrove and the tannery there, a total of 10 miles (16 km) of new track. In 1905 and 1906, the railroad was extended one last time 10 miles (16 km) northwest from Hillsgrove to the lumber boom town of Masten in Cascade and McNett Townships in Lycoming County. The Susquehanna and Eagles Mere Railroad was abandoned in sections between 1922 and 1930, as the lumber it was built to transport was depleted.
