= McIntyre Township, Pennsylvania =

Township in Pennsylvania, US

McIntyre Township, Lycoming County, Pennsylvania
- Township
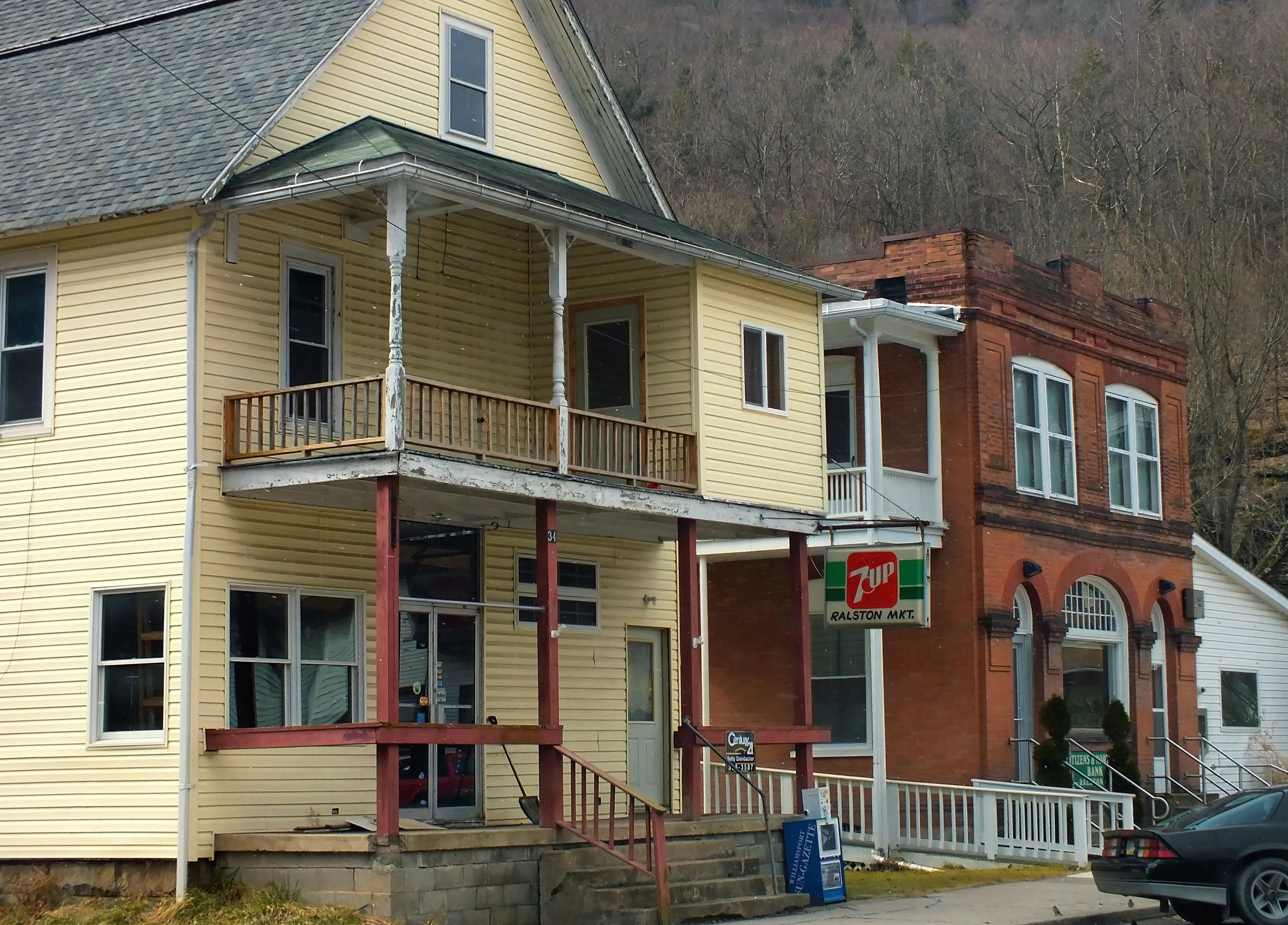
- Ralston is a village in the township.

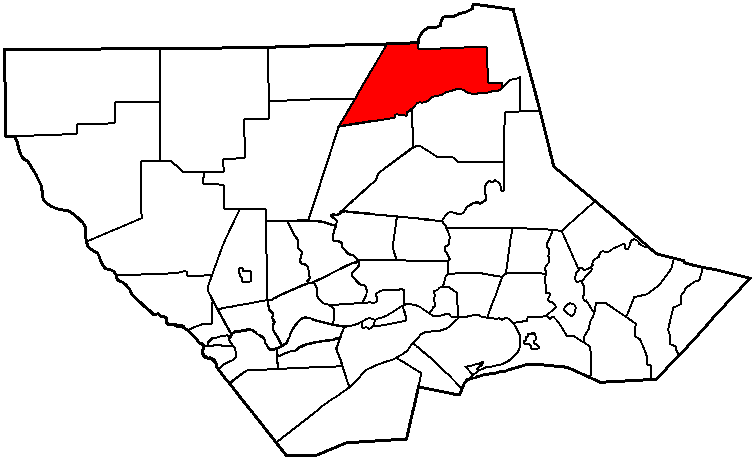
- Map of Lycoming County, Pennsylvania highlighting McIntyre Township

- Map of Lycoming County, Pennsylvania
- Coordinates: 41°30′19″N 76°57′16″W
- Country: United States
- State: Pennsylvania
- County: Lycoming
- Settled: 1805
- Incorporated: 1848

Area
  - Total: 47.46 sq mi (122.92 km^{2})
  - Land: 46.60 sq mi (120.70 km^{2})
  - Water: 0.86 sq mi (2.22 km^{2})
- Elevation: 1,909 ft (582 m)

Population (2020)
  - Total: 460 ▼
  - Estimate (2021): 457
  - Density: 10.8/sq mi (4.18/km^{2})
- Time zone: UTC-5 (Eastern (EST))
  - Summer (DST): UTC-4 (EDT)
- FIPS code: 42-081-46208
- GNIS feature ID: 1216758
- Website: http://mcintyretwp.org/

McIntyre Township is a township in Lycoming County, Pennsylvania, United States. The population was 460 at the 2020 census. It is part of the Williamsport Metropolitan Statistical Area.

== History ==
McIntyre Township was formed from territory taken from Lewis Township in 1848. It is named for Archibald McIntyre, one of the founders of the Williamsport and Elmira Railroad.

The first pioneers arrived in the McIntyre Township area in 1794 near what is now the village of Ralston. John Smithkontz cleared a parcel of land along Lycoming Creek near the mouth of Pleasant Stream on 1805.

The New York Iron and Coal Company created the first business venture in what was to become McIntyre Township when they constructed a sawmill on Lycoming Creek. The New York Iron and Coal Company also built an iron furnace near the mouth of Frozen Run in 1831. They began to make iron using iron ore that was mined nearby. The company also established a charcoal-making operation for the fuel that was needed to keep the furnaces fired. The iron industry had little success in McIntyre. The ore was difficult to clean; it could only be separated from the dirt that was mixed in when it was frozen. And the ore that they did manage to extract produced iron that proved to be very brittle. The reason that several companies attempted to succeed in what proved to be a failing enterprise was that the furnace was within easy distance of the Williamsport and Elmira Railroad, which connected the industrial centers of Williamsport, Pennsylvania, and Elmira, New York.

The McIntyre Coal company was founded by Jervis Langdon in 1870. He set up a coal mining operation in the mountains in the northeastern section of McIntyre Township. Coal mining had taken place on a small scale in the earlier years of the township, but Langdon was the first to open a large-scale operation. The coal company constructed a steep (45 degrees) and 2,300-foot-long (700 m) inclined plane to get the coal from the mine to the waiting railroad cars. The village of McIntyre sprang up around the coal mines. At one time it was home to 300 households, had a church, school, store, sawmill, a boot and shoe shop, and a public hall. The McIntyre Coal Company ceased operation in 1886. The mine was abandoned, and the town was abandoned shortly after the mine.

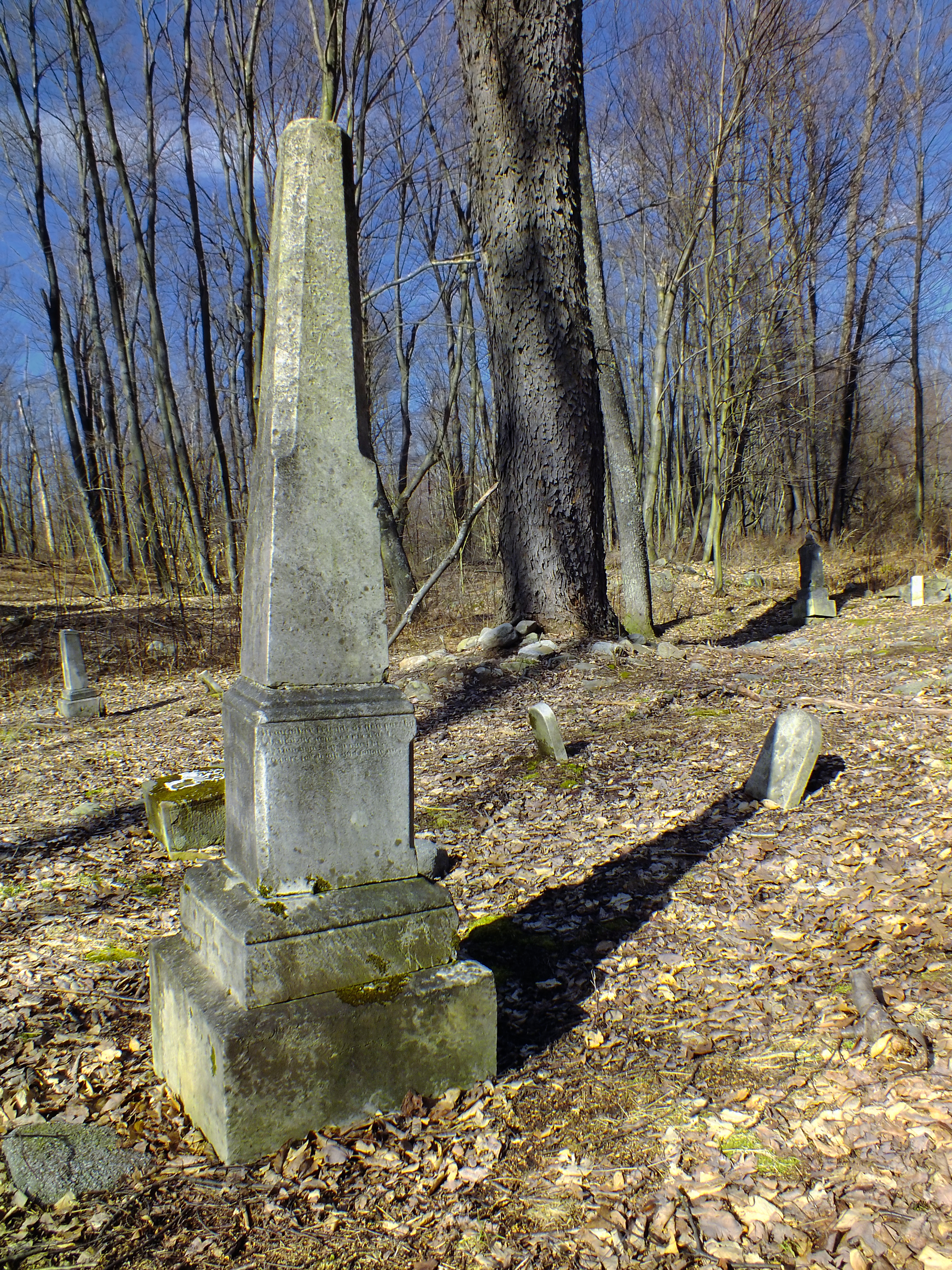
This cemetery in Loyalsock State Forest is all that remains from the village of McIntyre

== Geography ==
McIntyre Township is in northeastern Lycoming County and is bordered by Tioga County to the north, McNett Township to the north and east, Cascade Township to the southeast, Lewis and Cogan House townships to the southwest, and Jackson Township to the west. Pennsylvania Route 14 passes through the center of the township, leading southwest 11 miles (18 km) to U.S. Route 15 at Trout Run and northeast 14 miles (23 km) to Canton. Williamsport, the Lycoming county seat, is 26 miles (42 km) to the southwest via PA-14 and US-15.

According to the United States Census Bureau, McIntyre Township has a total area of 47.5 square miles (122.9 km^{2}), of which 46.6 square miles (120.7 km^{2}) are land and 0.85 square miles (2.2 km^{2}), or 1.80%, are water. Lycoming Creek, a south-flowing tributary of the West Branch Susquehanna River, runs through the center of the township.

== Demographics ==
Historical population
Census	Pop.	Note	%±
2010	520		—
2020	460		−11.5%
2021 (est.)	457		−0.7%
U.S. Decennial Census

As of the census of 2000, there were 539 people, 210 households, and 165 families residing in the township. The population density was 11.4 people per square mile (4.4/km^{2}). There were 278 housing units at an average density of 5.9/sq mi (2.3/km^{2}). The racial makeup of the township was 97.96% White, 0.74% African American, 1.11% Native American, and 0.19% from two or more races.

There were 210 households, out of which 33.8% had children under the age of 18 living with them, 59.5% were married couples living together, 10.5% had a female householder with no husband present, and 21.4% were non-families. 19.0% of all households were made up of individuals, and 11.0% had someone living alone who was 65 years of age or older. The average household size was 2.57 and the average family size was 2.84.

In the township the population was spread out, with 23.7% under the age of 18, 5.6% from 18 to 24, 29.5% from 25 to 44, 26.3% from 45 to 64, and 14.8% who were 65 years of age or older. The median age was 40 years. For every 100 females there were 92.5 males. For every 100 females age 18 and over, there were 91.2 males.

The median income for a household in the township was $36,000, and the median income for a family was $39,659. Males had a median income of $28,824 versus $19,250 for females. The per capita income for the township was $14,483. About 9.8% of families and 12.1% of the population were below the poverty line, including 16.4% of those under age 18 and 6.3% of those age 65 or over.
