= Bridge in Lewis Township =

- U.S. National Register of Historic Places
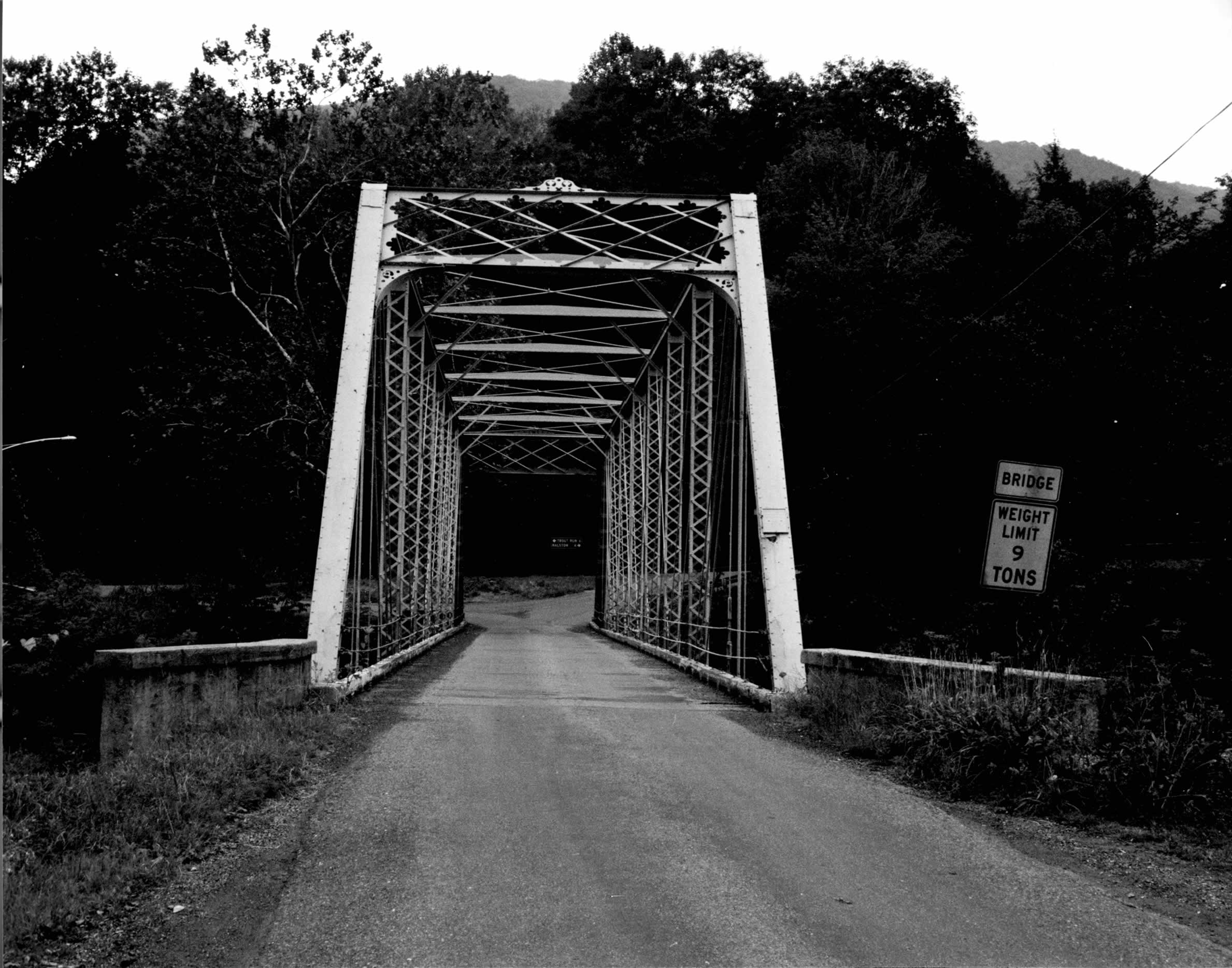
- Bridge in Lewis Township, 1982

- Location within Pennsylvania Location within the United States
- Location: Legislative Route 41051 over Lycoming Creek, Lewis Township, Pennsylvania
- Coordinates: 41°26′54″N 76°58′52″W
- Area: Less than 1 acre (0.40 ha)
- Built: 1890
- Built by: K. S. Perkins, E. A. Perkins
- Architectural style: Pratt through truss
- MPS: Highway Bridges Owned by the Commonwealth of Pennsylvania, Department of Transportation TR
- NRHP reference No.: 88000845
- Added to NRHP: June 22, 1988

Bridge in Lewis Township was an historic Pratt through truss bridge spanning Lycoming Creek at Lewis Township, Lycoming County, Pennsylvania. It was built in 1890, and measures 171 feet (52 m) long and 18 feet (5.5 m) wide.

It was added to the National Register of Historic Places in 1988. The bridge was documented for the Historic American Engineering Record in 1990 prior to removal and replacement of the bridge.

== See also ==
- List of bridges documented by the Historic American Engineering Record in Pennsylvania
