= Lewis Township, Lycoming County, Pennsylvania =

Township in Pennsylvania, US

- Township
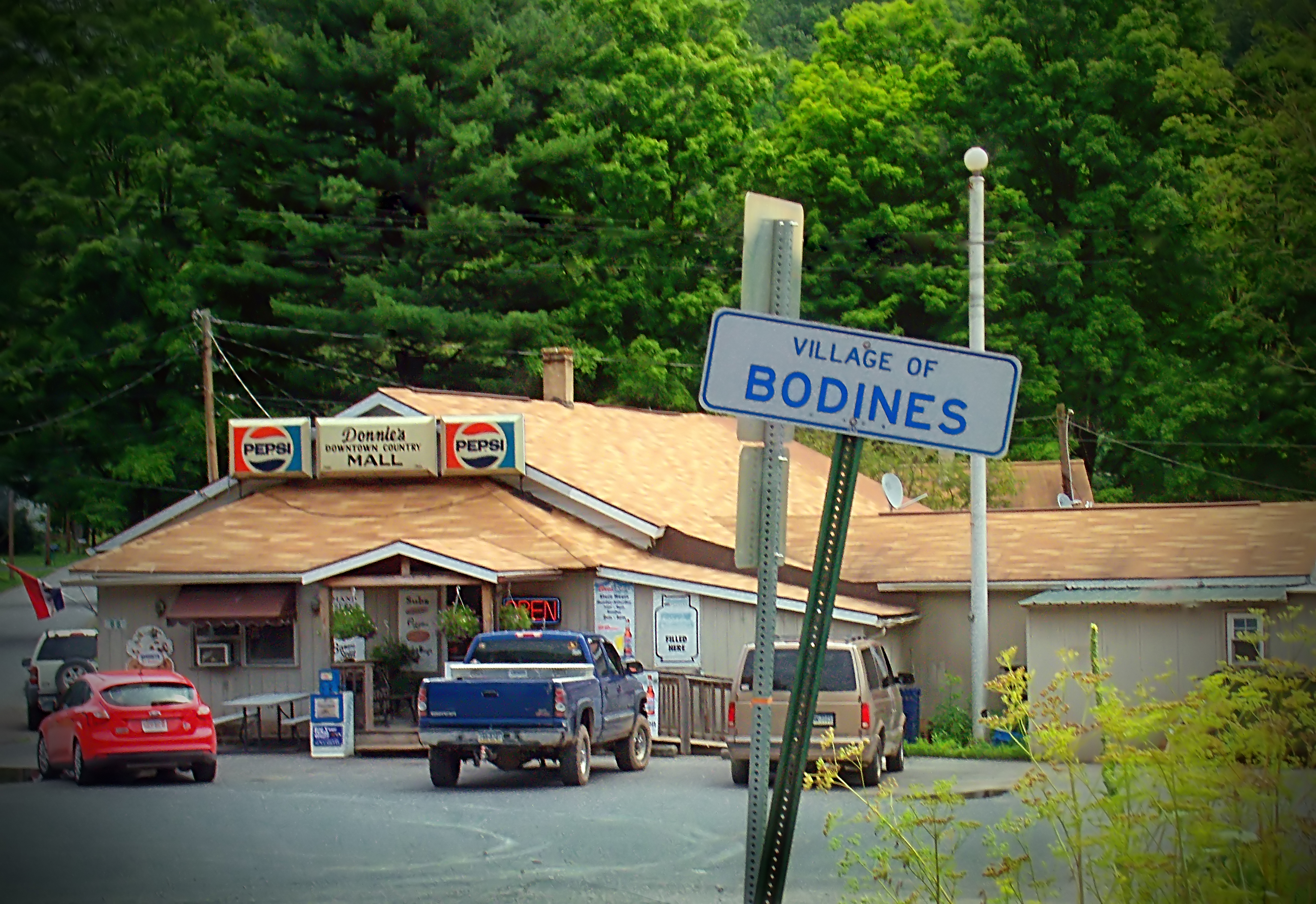
- Bodines is a village in the township.

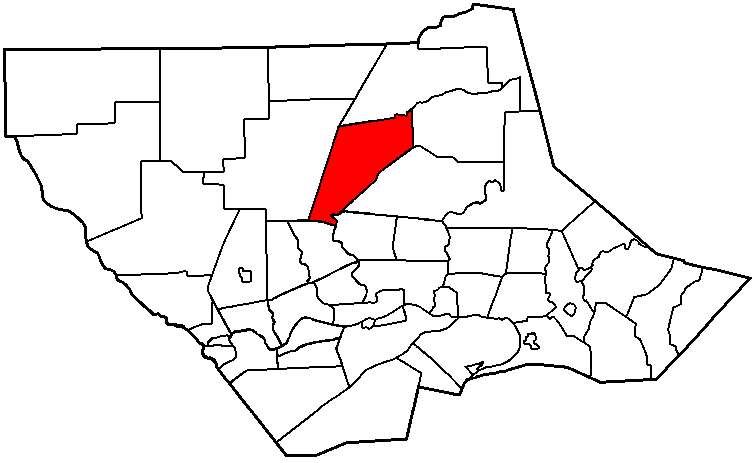
- Map of Lycoming County, Pennsylvania highlighting Lewis Township

- Map of Lycoming County, Pennsylvania=
- Coordinates: 41°24′1″N 77°2′40″W
- Country: United States
- State: Pennsylvania
- County: Lycoming
- Settled: 1812
- Incorporated: 1835

Area
  - Total: 37.44 sq mi (96.97 km^{2})
  - Land: 37.09 sq mi (96.06 km^{2})
  - Water: 0.35 sq mi (0.91 km^{2})
- Elevation: 1,732 ft (528 m)

Population (2010)
  - Total: 987
  - Estimate (2016): 965
  - Density: 26.0/sq mi (10.05/km^{2})
- Time zone: UTC-5 (Eastern Time Zone (North America))
  - Summer (DST): UTC-4 (EDT)
- FIPS code: 42-081-42944
- GNIS feature ID: 1216753

Lewis Township is a township in Lycoming County, Pennsylvania, United States. The population was 987 at the 2010 census, down from 1,139 in 2000. It is part of the Williamsport Metropolitan Statistical Area.

== History ==
Lewis Township was formed from part of Hepburn Township in 1835. It is named for Ellis Lewis, who was the president judge of the local district court at the time. The township was expanded on December 10, 1846, when part of Cascade Township was added to Lewis Township. This was done at the request of the residents of the area who were geographically cut off from the rest of Cascade Township.

Lycoming Creek and the Sheshequin Path played an important role in the early history of Lewis Township. The path was a major Native American trail that ran between two Native American villages: "French Margaret's Town" on the West Branch Susquehanna River (part of modern-day Williamsport) and "Sheshequin" on the North Branch of the Susquehanna River (modern day Ulster Township in Bradford County). The path ran north and east along Lycoming Creek in Lycoming County and followed much of Towanda Creek in Bradford County. It was a shortcut between the two main branches of the Susquehanna River and was used by early settlers as well as Native Americans.

Lycoming Creek, which begins to the north of Lewis Township in McNett Township, also served as a highway of sorts during the colonial era of Pennsylvania's history. The stream was used by early explorers and the Native Americans in the area as a means of travel. They were able to float their canoes down the creek and into the West Branch Susquehanna River. This mode of transportation was considerably faster than walking the path. Conrad Weiser guided Moravian missionaries along the creek and path to reach Onondaga, the capital of the Iroquois Confederacy in 1737. Raiding parties of Indian warriors used the creek and path in 1770 when conducting attacks on the West Branch Susquehanna Valley strongholds of Fort Muncy and Fort Freeland. Colonel Thomas Hartley led the 6th Pennsylvania Regiment up the Sheshequin Path during the American Revolution. Hartley's expedition in 1778 preceded the Sullivan Expedition of 1779. Both Hartley and Sullivan were instrumental in claiming the frontier of Pennsylvania and New York for the forces of the Continental Army. As Hartley and his men passed through Lewis Township, the Sheshequin path was widened. The widening of the path helped to open this area to settlement in the years following the Revolution.

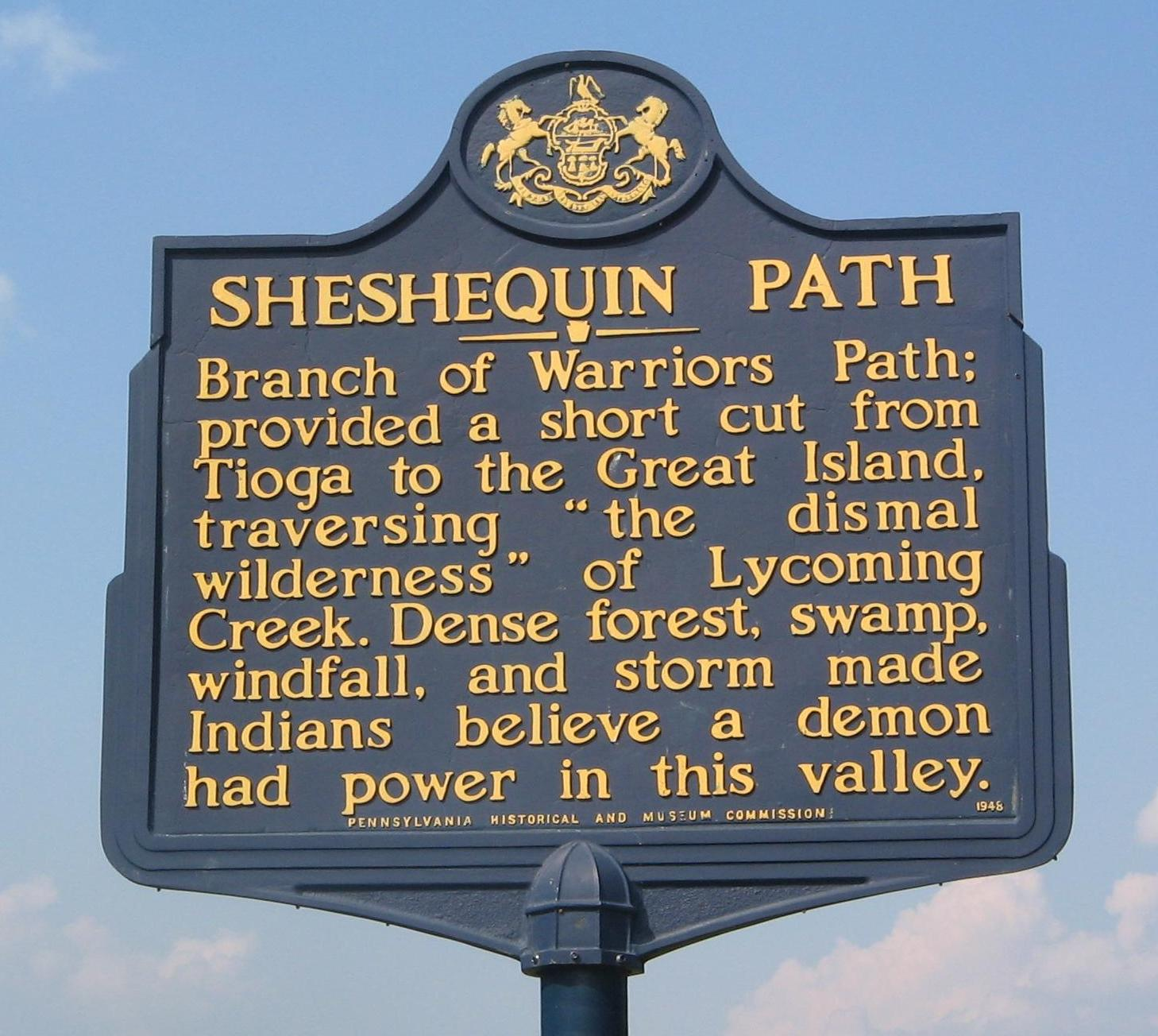
Sheshequin Path Pennsylvania Historical Marker on U.S. Route 15 near Trout Run

Lewis Township was largely uninhabited until after the Revolutionary War. A squatter named A.M. Slack is believed to have been the first permanent settler. He built a cabin and cleared some land in the area that is now the village of Bodines. The village of Trout Run has its beginnings during the construction of the Williamson Road. This road, which stretched from Williamsport to Painted Post, New York, helped open north-central Pennsylvania to settlement. Charles Williamson, the builder of the road, established a supply depot at Trout Run.

Much of Lewis Township is covered with steep slopes that were carved into the Allegheny Plateau by the streams that drain into the West Branch Susquehanna River. The geography of the township has limited its development. The narrow valley of Lycoming Creek is where most of the settlement of Lewis Township has occurred. James Kyle arrived in the area sometime around 1800. He owned 260 acres (1.1 km^{2}) along Lycoming Creek. Kyle took out an advertisement in the Lycoming Gazette. The ad placed on March 14, 1810, read as follows.

(For sale:) A valuable farm situated on Lycoming creek, twelve miles from Williamsport, containing 260 acres, between thirty and forty of which are cleared, with six acres of meadow, a thriving young orchard of apple trees, and a nice peach orchard. A square log house and kitchen, a good log barn, one of the best mill seats on Lycoming, on which there is a grist mill. In a word, the place is fit for almost any public business, as the great road (Williamson) leading to the State of New York passes through it.

Kyle's farm was eventually sold to Robert Allen. Robert and his family were among the most successful and prominent early settlers. Allen was born in Northumberland on August 6, 1797. His father, John Allen, was a native of County Down, Ulster, and his mother was from Scotland. John Allen moved from Northumberland to a section of land along Lycoming Creek between Cogan Station and Hepburnville in Hepburn Township. He died in 1819 and his farm was divided among his children. Robert Allen sold his share of the farm to his brothers and moved further north along Lycoming Creek and bought the land that was formerly owned by James Kyle. Allen and his wife Mary Ann Hews improved the Kyle farm. They rose to a position of prominence as the owners of an inn that was frequently busy with visitors who were moving along the Williamson Road. Allen was also employed as a surveyor and civil engineer. He spent several years working for the United States government in the Northwest Territory, especially in what is now Michigan along the Detroit River and Lake Huron. Allen died in 1849 and his wife died in 1883. Her parents Henry and Martha Hews were part of the failed "English Settlement" in Pine Township. They had migrated to Pennsylvania from Chard, Somerset, England. After struggling to survive in Pine Township, Henry Hews cleared and established several successful farms in Tioga County and northern Lycoming County before finally settling near Trout Run, where his daughter met and married Robert Allen.

Lewis Township has changed little over the years. The population in 2010 was nearly equivalent to the number in the census of 1890, when it was 985. Trout Run is on U.S. Route 15, which follows the old Williamson Road. This highway is currently part of the Interstate 99 project.

The Bridge in Lewis Township was added to the National Register of Historic Places in 1988.

== Geography ==
Lewis Township is in north-central Lycoming County and is bordered by Cogan House Township to the west, McIntyre Township to the north, Cascade Township to the northeast, Gamble Township to the southeast, Hepburn Township at the extreme south corner, and Lycoming Township to the southwest. U.S. Route 15, the Appalachian Thruway, passes through the township, following the valley of Lycoming Creek in the south and turning up the side valley of Trout Run to the northwest. US-15 leads south 15 miles (24 km) to Williamsport, the Lycoming county seat, and north 35 miles (56 km) to Mansfield. Pennsylvania Route 14 leads northeast from Trout Run, continuing up the Lycoming Creek valley 25 miles (40 km) to Canton.

According to the United States Census Bureau, the township has a total area of 37.5 square miles (97.0 km^{2}), of which 37.1 square miles (96.1 km^{2}) are land and 0.3 square miles (0.9 km^{2}), or 1.68%, are water. Lycoming Creek runs the length of the township from northeast to southwest on its course to the West Branch Susquehanna River at Williamsport. The Allegheny Plateau rises to elevations of 1,800 to 2,100 feet (550 to 640 m) on both sides of the creek, 1,200 to 1,400 feet (370 to 430 m) above the valley bottom.

== Demographics ==
Historical population
Census	Pop.	Note	%±
2010	987		—
2016 (est.)	965		−2.2%
U.S. Decennial Census

As of the census of 2000, there were 1,139 people, 451 households, and 304 families residing in the township. The population density was 30.1 inhabitants per square mile (11.6/km^{2}). There were 572 housing units at an average density of 15.1/sq mi (5.8/km^{2}). The racial makeup of the township was 98.68% White, 0.35% African American, 0.09% Native American, 0.09% Asian, and 0.79% from two or more races. Hispanic or Latino of any race were 0.79% of the population.

There were 451 households, out of which 29.9% had children under the age of 18 living with them, 53.0% were married couples living together, 11.1% had a female householder with no husband present, and 32.4% were non-families. 25.1% of all households were made up of individuals, and 7.5% had someone living alone who was 65 years of age or older. The average household size was 2.53 and the average family size was 3.00.

In the township the population was spread out, with 24.7% under the age of 18, 7.3% from 18 to 24, 29.7% from 25 to 44, 26.4% from 45 to 64, and 11.9% who were 65 years of age or older. The median age was 38 years. For every 100 females there were 104.1 males. For every 100 females age 18 and over, there were 100.0 males.

The median income for a household in the township was $34,074, and the median income for a family was $38,661. Males had a median income of $27,989 versus $20,300 for females. The per capita income for the township was $14,780. About 7.8% of families and 10.0% of the population were below the poverty line, including 9.2% of those under age 18 and 10.6% of those age 65 or over.
