= Masten, Pennsylvania =

Ghost town in Pennsylvania, US

Coordinates: 41°30′26″N 76°49′14″W

Masten is a ghost town in Cascade and McNett Townships in Lycoming County, Pennsylvania, United States. It was a lumber mill company town from 1905 to 1930, served as the site of a Civilian Conservation Corps camp from 1933 to 1940, and the last family left it in 1941. Since then it has been a ghost town and the site serves as the trailhead for the Old Loggers Path, a loop hiking trail.

== History ==
Masten was founded as a lumber mill town in 1905 by Charles W. Sones. Sones owned the mill and town and worked under a contract with the Union Tanning Company, which needed hemlock bark for tanning leather and also sold hardwoods from the area. The village was served by two railroad lines: the Susquehanna and New York Railroad and the Susquehanna and Eagles Mere Railroad. The railroads passed through many cuts and fills, and the grades built at the height of the lumber era in Pennsylvania today carry the Old Loggers Path.

In April 1917 the contract with Sones expired and the mill, town, and railroads were purchased by the Central Pennsylvania Lumber Company. The mill was in operation from 1905 to September 18, 1930, when the last log was cut. After the mill closed, most of the houses were torn down and their lumber sold and the Susquehanna and Eagles Mere Railroad was abandoned. In 1926, a two-room schoolhouse was briefly constructed on the north edge of Masten to serve the families of seasonal workers, but it was dismantled after only one winter due to poor attendance and flooding. On May 6, 1933, Civilian Conservation Corps "State Forest Camp" S-80-Pa was established at the site of Masten, and some of the remaining buildings were torn down to make the camp. The CCC camp closed in 1940. Some families had stayed after the mill closed and during the CCC era, but in 1941 the last family left Masten. As of 2007, only some foundations of the buildings and a smokestack are still left standing from Masten. There are still some of the original homes/structures still standing today and being used as hunting camps.

== See also ==
- List of ghost towns in Pennsylvania
