= Jackson Township, Lycoming County, Pennsylvania =

Township in Pennsylvania, US

- Township
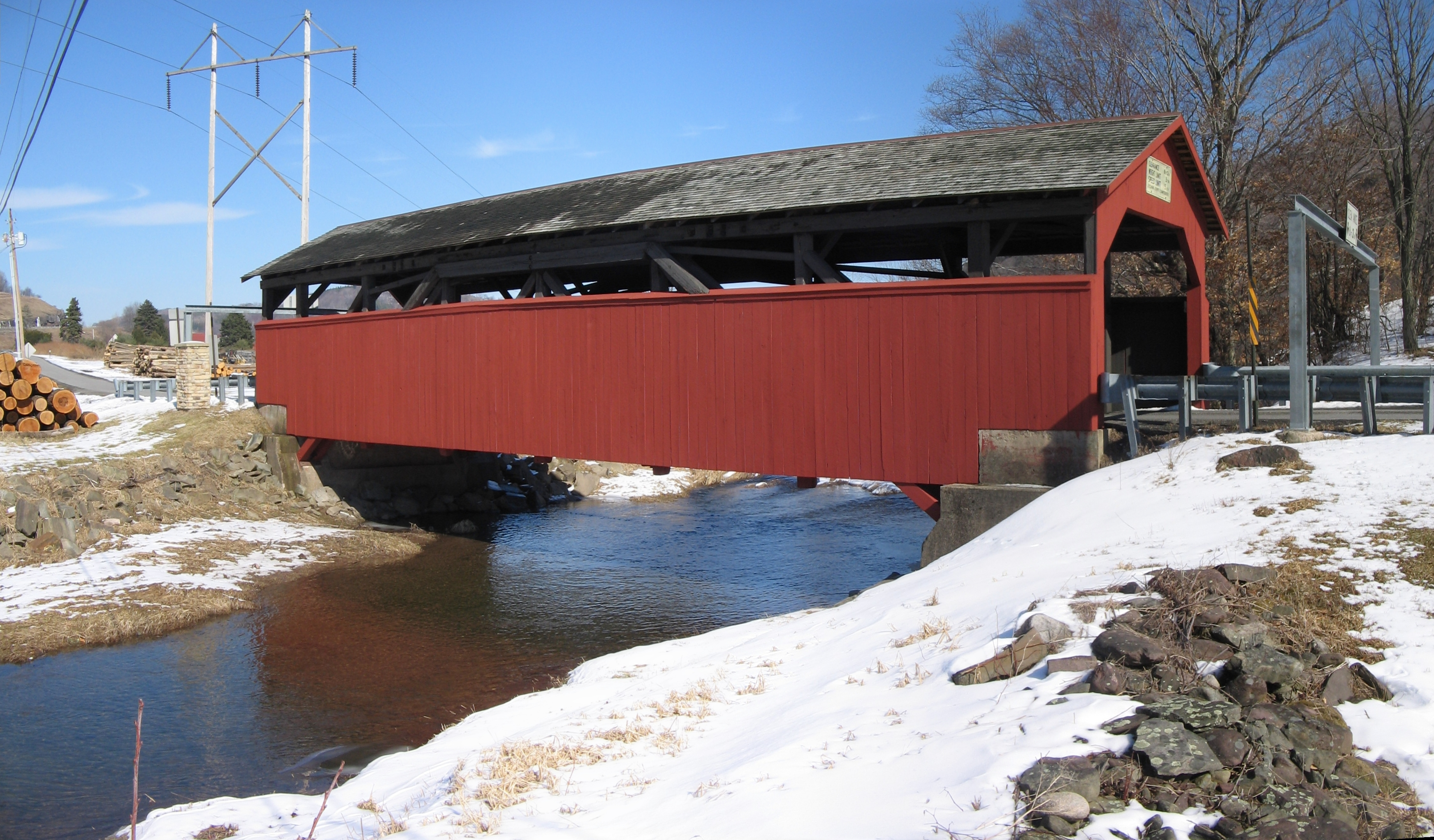
- The Buttonwood Covered Bridge over Blockhouse Creek, built 1898 and on the National Register of Historic Places

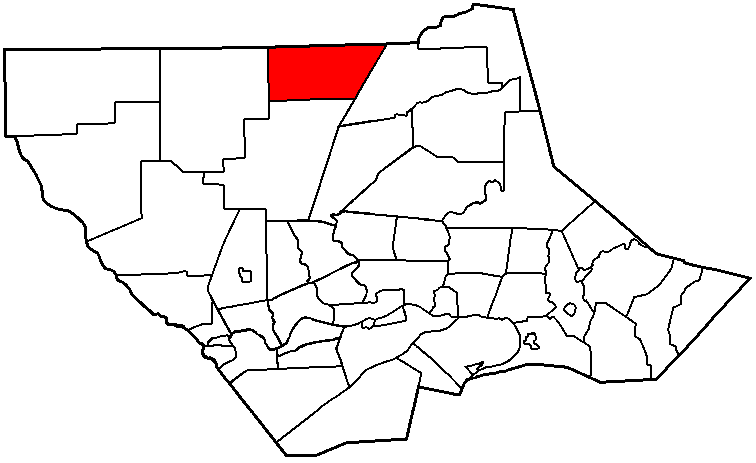
- Map of Lycoming County, Pennsylvania highlighting Jackson Township

- Map of Lycoming County, Pennsylvania
- Coordinates: 41°32′2″N 77°7′22″W
- Country: United States
- State: Pennsylvania
- County: Lycoming
- Settled: 1811
- Formed: 1824

Area
  - Total: 37.25 sq mi (96.49 km^{2})
  - Land: 37.04 sq mi (95.94 km^{2})
  - Water: 0.21 sq mi (0.55 km^{2})
- Elevation: 1,300 ft (400 m)

Population (2020)
  - Total: 394 ▼
  - Estimate (2021): 394
  - Density: 10.5/sq mi (4.04/km^{2})
- Time zone: UTC-5 (Eastern Time Zone (North America))
  - Summer (DST): UTC-4 (EDT)
- FIPS code: 42-081-37408
- GNIS feature ID: 1216720

Jackson Township is a township in Lycoming County, Pennsylvania, United States. The population was 394 at the 2020 census. It is part of the Williamsport Metropolitan Statistical Area.

The unincorporated village of Buttonwood is in the township. In Buttonwood there is a covered bridge over Blockhouse Creek, a tributary of Little Pine Creek.

== History ==
Jackson Township was once part of Lycoming Township. At the time Lycoming Township stretched from the West Branch Susquehanna River to the northern border of Lycoming County. The residents of the northern part of the township became dissatisfied with their representation in township matters. Most of the officers of the townships were from the southernmost portions near the river and they tended to forget about their neighbors to the north. The concerned citizens of the northern portions of Lycoming Township petitioned that a township for their interests be formed from Lycoming Township, and the Court of Quarter Sessions of the Peace of Lycoming County formed Jackson Township in 1824. The township was named for Andrew Jackson, who was then known as the hero of the Battle of New Orleans in the War of 1812. He was not to become President until 1829.

Peter Sechrist was one of the first settlers to arrive in Jackson Township. He moved there from Liverpool, Pennsylvania, in 1811. Sechrist cleared the land for a farm and also constructed a saw and gristmill. His mills were the first of their kind in the area, and his child, Daniel, was the first white child born in the area. Other earlier settlers, seeking their fortune, arrived from York County. Two sets of brothers, Jacob and Daniel Beck and George and Daniel Miller, first stopped in Williamsport before moving further to the north. They cleared some dense wilderness and established their homesteads in what is now eastern Jackson Township.

The population of Jackson Township was 619 according to the 1890 census. It has since declined to 396 residents as of the 2010 census. The area is largely mountainous and is covered with a thriving second-growth forest.

The Buttonwood Covered Bridge was added to the National Register of Historic Places in 1980.

== Geography ==
Jackson Township is on the northern edge of Lycoming County and is bordered by Tioga County to the north, McIntyre Township to the east, Cogan House Township to the south, and Pine Township to the west. U.S. Route 15, the Appalachian Thruway, passes through the center of the township, with access from Exit 158 at Buttonwood. US-15 leads north 23 miles (37 km) to Mansfield and south 25 miles (40 km) to Williamsport, the Lycoming county seat. Pennsylvania Route 284 runs west from US-15 down the valley of Blockhouse Creek and Little Pine Creek to Pennsylvania Route 287 in Pine Township.

According to the United States Census Bureau, the township has a total area of 37.3 square miles (96.5 km^{2}), of which 37.0 square miles (95.9 km^{2}) are land and 0.2 square miles (0.5 km^{2}), or 1.26%, are water. Blockhouse Creek drains the center of the township, flowing southwestward to Little Pine Creek and thence Pine Creek, leading to the West Branch Susquehanna River at Jersey Shore, Pennsylvania. Blacks Creek, another tributary of Little Pine Creek, drains the northwest corner of the township. The eastern part of the township is drained by tributaries of Lycoming Creek, another tributary of the West Branch Susquehanna: Grays Run in the southeast, and Roaring Branch in the northeast.

== Demographics ==
Historical population
Census	Pop.	Note	%±
2010	396		—
2020	394		−0.5%
2021 (est.)	394		0.0%
U.S. Decennial Census

As of the census of 2000, there were 414 people, 148 households, and 121 families residing in the township. The population density was 11.6 people per square mile (4.5/km^{2}). There were 192 housing units at an average density of 5.4/sq mi (2.1/km^{2}). The racial makeup of the township was 99.76% White and 0.24% Pacific Islander. Hispanic or Latino of any race were 0.48% of the population.

There were 148 households, out of which 37.2% had children under the age of 18 living with them, 70.9% were married couples living together, 7.4% had a female householder with no husband present, and 18.2% were non-families. 14.9% of all households were made up of individuals, and 4.1% had someone living alone who was 65 years of age or older. The average household size was 2.80 and the average family size was 3.11.

In the township the population was spread out, with 27.1% under the age of 18, 5.1% from 18 to 24, 30.0% from 25 to 44, 23.7% from 45 to 64, and 14.3% who were 65 years of age or older. The median age was 39 years. For every 100 females there were 97.1 males. For every 100 females age 18 and over, there were 105.4 males.

The median income for a household in the township was $40,568, and the median income for a family was $40,000. Males had a median income of $28,958 versus $19,063 for females. The per capita income for the township was $16,903. About 6.7% of families and 6.7% of the population were below the poverty line, including 13.9% of those under age 18 and none of those age 65 or over.
