= Camp Susque =

Christian camp in Trout Run, Pennsylvania, US

Coordinates: 41°25′02″N 77°01′59″W

Camp Susque is an ACA accredited nondenominational Christian summer camp and retreat facility located in Trout Run, Pennsylvania, a village north of Williamsport, Pennsylvania, founded in 1947.

== History ==
The first camp, at a rented location, was attended by 23 boys. In 1949, incorporation papers were obtained in the name of Susque Boys' Club, Inc. In 1951 Camp Kline, where the first camp was held, became unavailable, so Bob Dittmar began looking for an alternative location. Land along Lycoming Creek in Lycoming County was available and ideal, so the advisory board met and agreed to purchase the land for $10,000. In 1953 the purchase was finalized, and the following summer, Camp Susque moved to its current location. Bob Dittmar and Bob Christenson designed a logo for the camp.

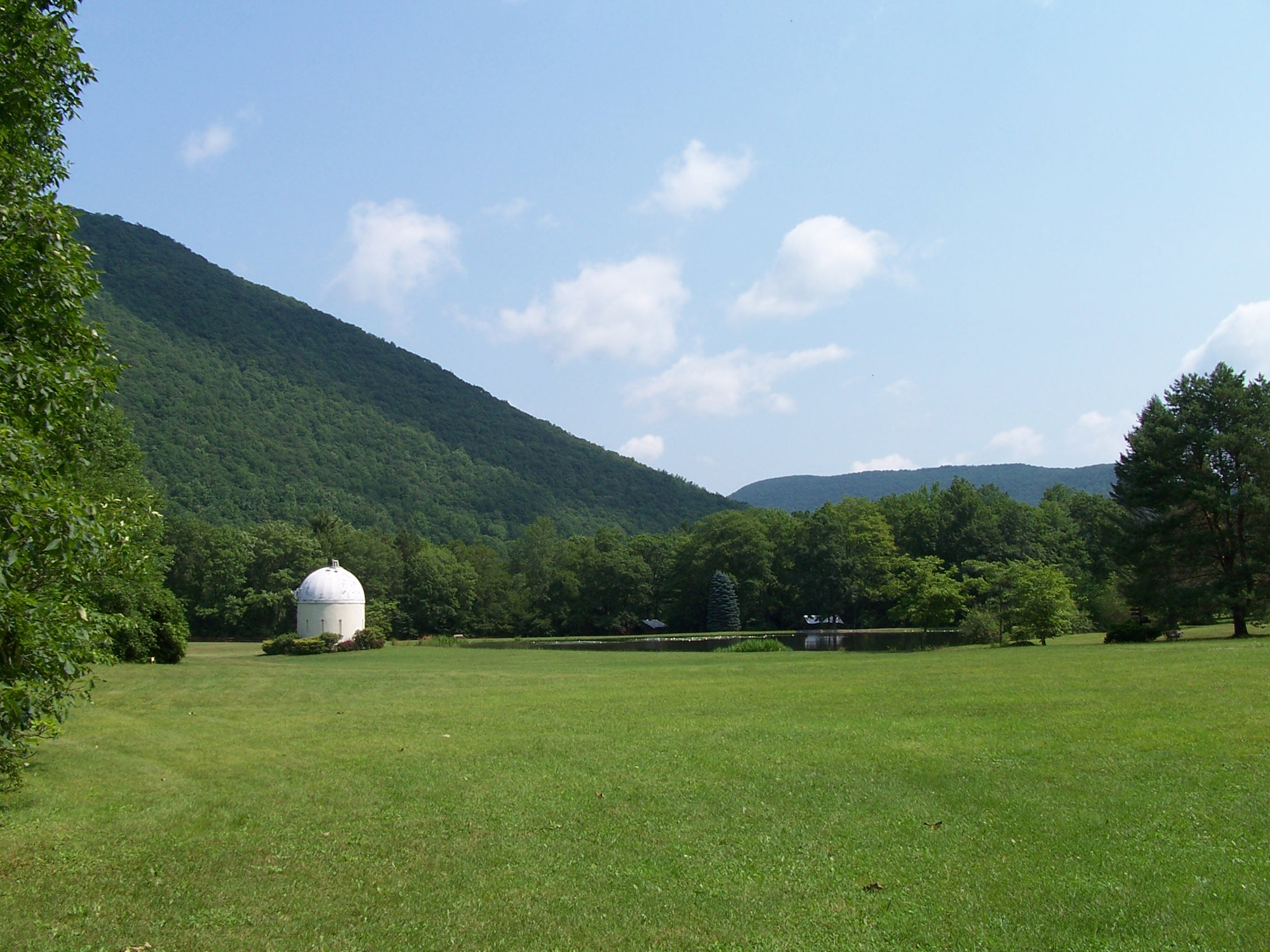
Camp Susque's observatory, used for stargazing, is on the left. On the right is the Susque Pond.

Attendance continued to grow, and the facilities continued to expand. A girl's camp program was added, and the name changed to Camp Susque.

== Programming ==
Each year, there are three weeks of a boys-only camp, with three levels, Littlemen (grades 3–5), Redmen (grades 6–8), and Woodsmen (grades 9–11), followed by three weeks of girls-only camp with the levels of Jays (grades 3–5), Doves (grades 6–8), and Hawks (grades 9–11). The camp also has a "Young Explorers Camp" for children grades 1-3 who are not yet old enough to attend the regular week-long camp. There is also a "Family Camp" where families can rent a tent platform or cabin. Camp Susque also offers off-site "Wilderness Trips", for teens 14–18. One of these, the "Adirondack Adventure" is a week-long canoe trip in New York; it entails canoeing each day to a different island and camping there for the night. There is also a hike up Mount Ampersand in the middle of the week.^{2}

Camp Susque also houses and sponsors The Susque Academy. The academy is a two-week intensive worldview studies program, primarily intended as an academic and spiritual formation opportunity for high school and early college-age students. The curriculum consists of five core classes focusing on worldviews, apologetics, devotional classics, Biblical studies, and practical theology. The program's goal is to ground students in Christian truth while exposing them to alternative truth-claims found in contemporary culture. Additional seminars provide a look at art, music, literature, science, ethics, politics, leadership, and personal discipline.

Camp Susque is not only a summer camp, but also has events during the winter season. Winter Camps are co-ed and split into four age groups. The Chill is for campers in grades 3–5, the Frost for grades 6–8, the Freeze for grades 9-12 and the Blast for college-age young adults. Freeze and Blast occur during or over the Christmas to New Year's holidays. Frost and Chill occur in January and late February, respectively.
