= Buttonwood Covered Bridge =

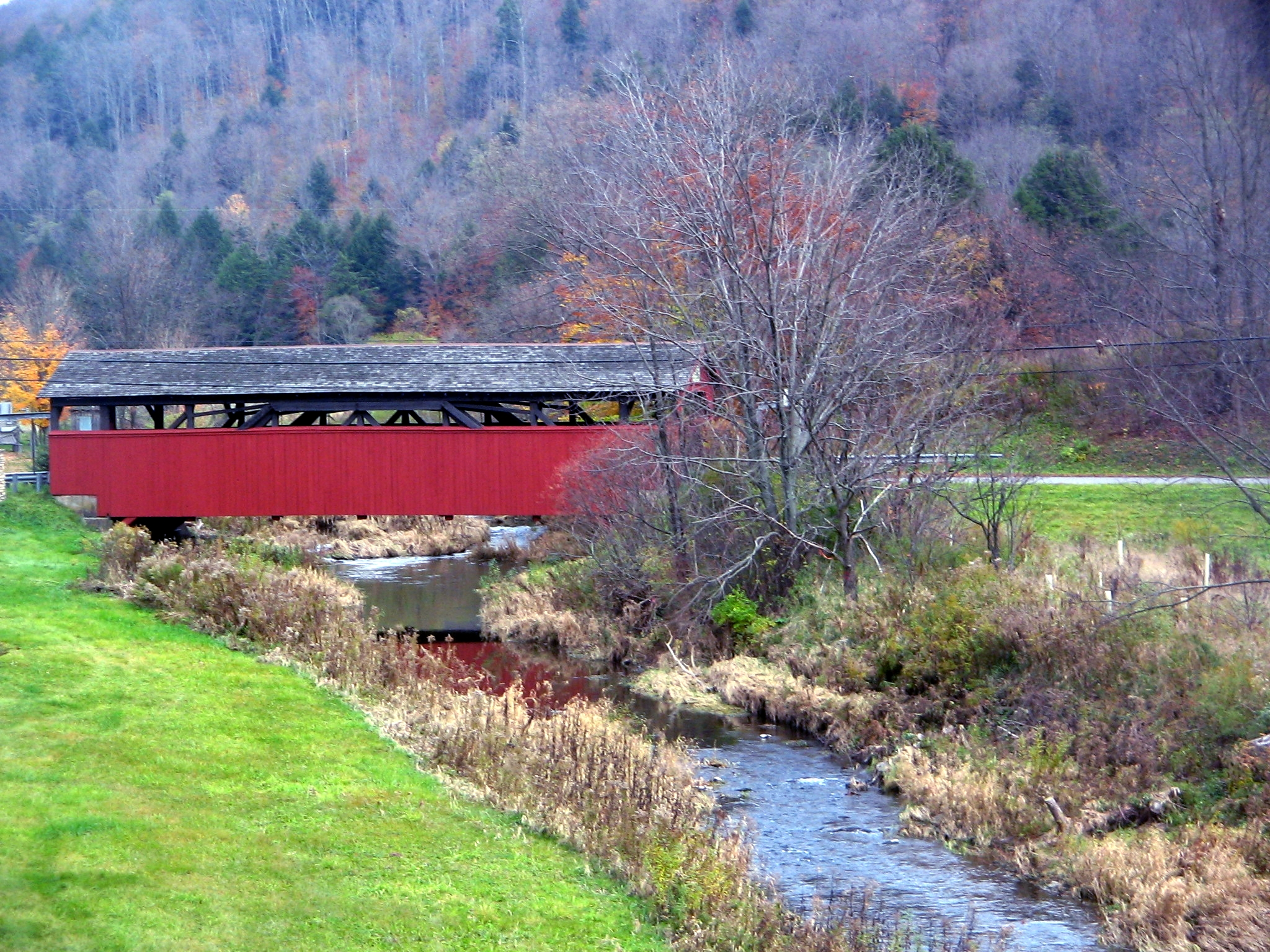
- Buttonwood Covered Bridge and Blockhouse Creek, as seen from the northbound lane of US 15
- Coordinates: 41.509894°N 77.130107°W
- Carries: Township 816 (Covered Bridge Rd)
- Crosses: Blockhouse Creek
- Locale: Lycoming, Pennsylvania, United States
- Official name: Buttonwood Covered Bridge
- Named for: village of Buttonwood
- Maintained by: Lycoming County
- NBI Number: 417215081601110

Characteristics
- Design: National Register of Historic Places
- Total length: 74.2 ft (22.6 m)
- Width: 14.4 ft (4.4 m)
- Height: 10.7 ft (3.3 m)
- Load limit: 3 tons (2.7 t)

History
- Built: 1878 or 1898
- Buttonwood Covered Bridge
- U.S. National Register of Historic Places
- MPS: Covered Bridges of Bradford, Sullivan and Lycoming Counties TR
- NRHP reference No.: 80003569
- Added to NRHP: July 24, 1980

Location
- Interactive map of Buttonwood Covered Bridge

The Buttonwood Covered Bridge is a covered bridge built in either 1878 or 1898 over Blockhouse Creek in Jackson Township, Lycoming County in the U.S. state of Pennsylvania. It uses a queen post with king post truss and is 74 feet 2 inches (22.6 m) long. The bridge was placed on the National Register of Historic Places in 1980, and had a major restoration in 1998. It is the shortest and most heavily used of the three covered bridges remaining in Lycoming County.

== Dimensions ==
The following table is a comparison of published measurements of length, width and load recorded in different sources using different methods, as well as the structural type cited. The NBI measures bridge length between the "backwalls of abutments" or pavement grooves and the roadway width as "the most restrictive minimum distance between curbs or rails". The NRHP form measures length from "end post to end post", and was prepared by the Pennsylvania Historical and Museum Commission (PHMC), which surveyed county engineers, historical and covered bridge societies, and others for all the covered bridges in the commonwealth. The Evans visited every covered bridge in Pennsylvania in 2001 and measured each bridge's length (portal to portal) and width (at the portal) for their book. The data in Zacher's book was based on a 1991 survey of all covered bridges in Pennsylvania by the PHMC and the Pennsylvania Department of Transportation, aided by local government and private agencies. The article uses primarily the NBI and NRHP data, as they are national programs.

Length feet (m)	Width feet (m)	Load short tons (MT)	Truss type(s)	Year built	Source (Year)
77 feet 6 inches (23.6 m)	16 feet 6 inches (5.0 m)	3.0 short tons (2.7 t)	Queen post	1878	Landis (1966)
74 feet 2 inches (22.6 m)	14 feet 5 inches (4.4 m)	11 short tons (10.0 t)	Wood or Timber	Pre-1900	NBI (2009)
63 feet 6 inches (19.4 m)	14 feet 5 inches (4.4 m)	3.0 short tons (2.7 t)	Multiple kingpost and queenpost Burr arch	1898	NRHP (1980)
74 feet 4 inches (22.7 m)	15 feet 8.5 inches (4.8 m)	NA	Queenpost with kingpost	1898	Evans (2001)
57 feet (17.4 m)	14 feet 5 inches (4.4 m)	NA	Burr	1898	Zacher (1994)

== See also ==
- List of bridges on the National Register of Historic Places in Pennsylvania
