= Old Loggers Path =

Hiking trail in Pennsylvania

Coordinates: 41°31′18″N 76°53′47″W

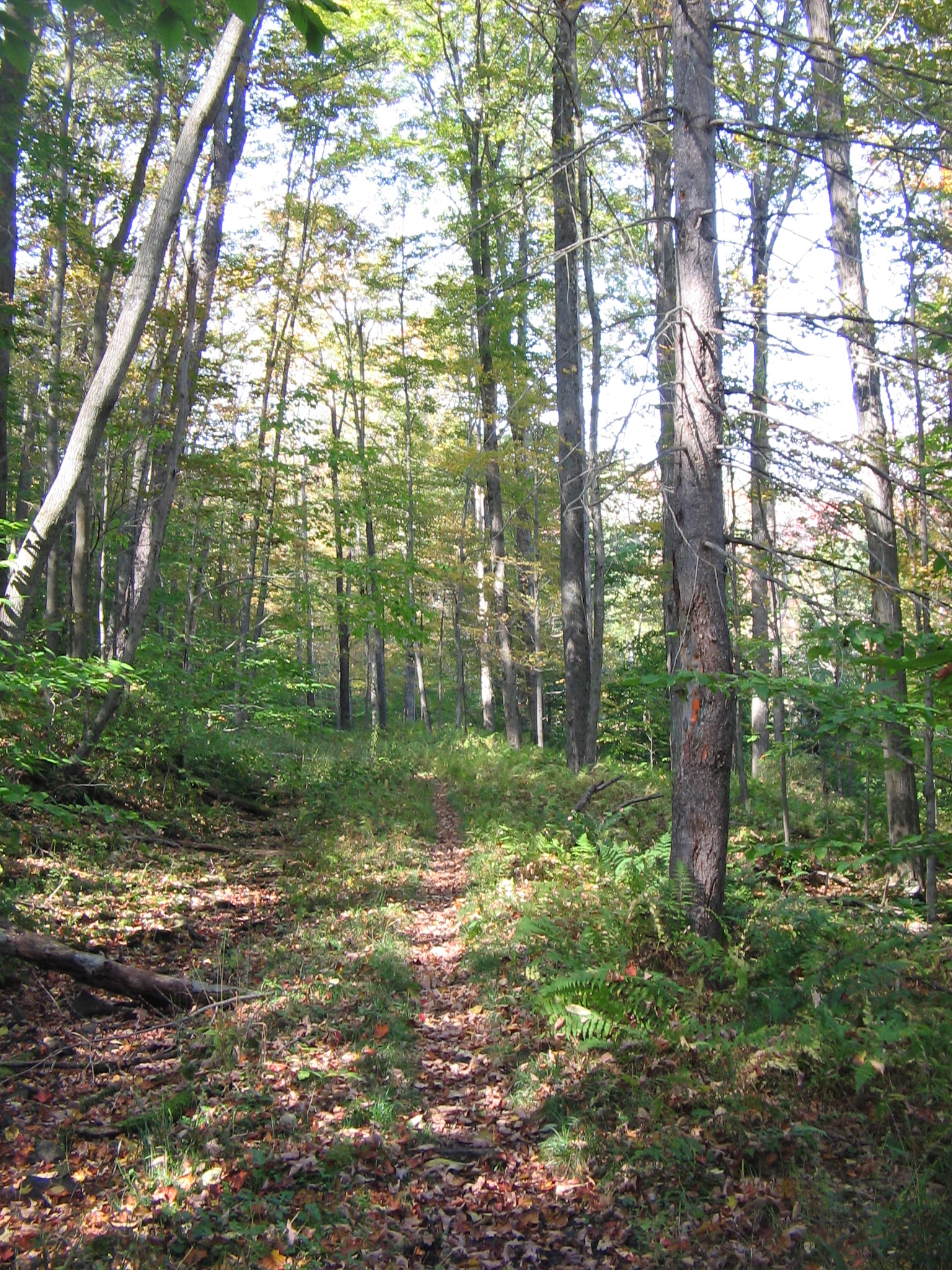
- The Old Loggers Path north of Masten ghost town in Loyalsock State Forest.
- Length: 27.8 mi (44.7 km)
- Location: Lycoming County, Pennsylvania, US
- Trailheads: Pleasant Stream Road, Masten
- Use: Hiking
- Elevation change: High
- Difficulty: Moderate to difficult
- Season: Year round
- Hazards: Uneven and wet terrain, rattlesnakes, mosquitoes, ticks, black bears

The Old Loggers Path is a 27.8 mi (44.7 km) hiking trail in north-central Pennsylvania, forming a loop through Loyalsock State Forest. The most commonly used trailhead is at the ghost town of Masten. The trail makes use of abandoned logging railroad grades originating in the late 1800s, and some roads originally built by the Civilian Conservation Corps in the 1930s. The trail is known for numerous vistas, rock formations, and scenic streams, and for the remnants of past industrial infrastructure reclaimed by the forest.

== History ==
This area of Loyalsock State Forest was owned by the Union Tanning Company and then the Pennsylvania Lumber Company, and was almost entirely clear-cut by the early 1900s. The hills were criss-crossed by many railroads and (later) roads, the routes of which are now used by hikers. Loggers inhabited the town of Masten, which was once a substantial community but had been abandoned by about 1930 after local logging opportunities dried up. Masten then housed a Civilian Conservation Corps camp, from which workers embarked on projects to rehabilitate the nearby forest. Masten is now a ghost town featuring little more than a few hunting camps. In 2017 historic flooding on Pleasant Stream destroyed roads throughout the area, including some portions of the trail.

== Route ==
This description illustrates the Old Loggers Path in the clockwise direction. From the official trailhead at a campground parking lot in Masten, the trail follows Pleasant Stream Road east at first, then turns south at 0.5 mile to begin a climb along Bear Run to the top of the Allegheny Plateau. The trail traverses a high plateau-top area starting at 2.9 miles, with widespread stinging nettle and wild blueberry in the understory. The trail reaches a significant vista at 5.0 miles and descends to a crossing of Cascade Road at 5.8 miles. The trail climbs back to the top of the plateau and at 8.2 miles crosses an old road that leads a short distance to another vista.

After some more time on high ground, the trail begins a significant descent alongside Butternut Run at 8.9 miles. At 10.4 miles there is a bridgeless crossing of the wide and sometimes treacherous Pleasant Stream. The trail then turns onto an old railroad grade between the stream and the road of the same name; this is a recent relocation to eliminate some road walking and to bypass a section of Pleasant Stream Road that was severely damaged by flooding in 2017. The trail follows Pleasant Stream Road itself for a short distance at 11.4 miles then heads north, beginning another significant climb alongside Long Run toward the top of the plateau. The plateau-top is reached at 13.4 miles, after which the trail stays on high ground for the next several miles. At 18.7 miles the trail curves sharply to the southeast along the top of the rugged canyon formed by Yellow Dog Run. The road of the same name is crossed at 19.6 miles, after which the trail makes a wide U-turn back to the northwest, along the top of the other side of the canyon.

After a steep descent at the outlet of Yellow Dog Run's canyon, the trail reaches Rock Run at 21.3 miles, and turns east to follow that creek upstream. The trail reaches the top of the plateau yet again at 24.0 miles and turns sharply to the south onto an old jeep road at 25.3 miles. The trail briefly follows Ellenton Road at 25.7 miles then continues to the south. The trail begins its final descent at 26.3 miles, following two branches of North Pleasant Stream. At 27.8 miles, the trail turns east briefly on Pleasant Stream Road, then reaches the trailhead in Masten to end the loop.
