= Wallis Run =

Coordinates: 41°21′15″N 76°54′44″W

Wallis Run is a 9.8-mile-long (15.8 km) tributary of Loyalsock Creek in Lycoming County, Pennsylvania, in the United States. It gives its name to the community of Wallis Run, located along the stream where it turns from southward to westward.

== See also ==
- List of rivers of Pennsylvania
