= Pleasant Stream =

River in Pennsylvania, United States

Coordinates: 41.50126°N 76.82713°W

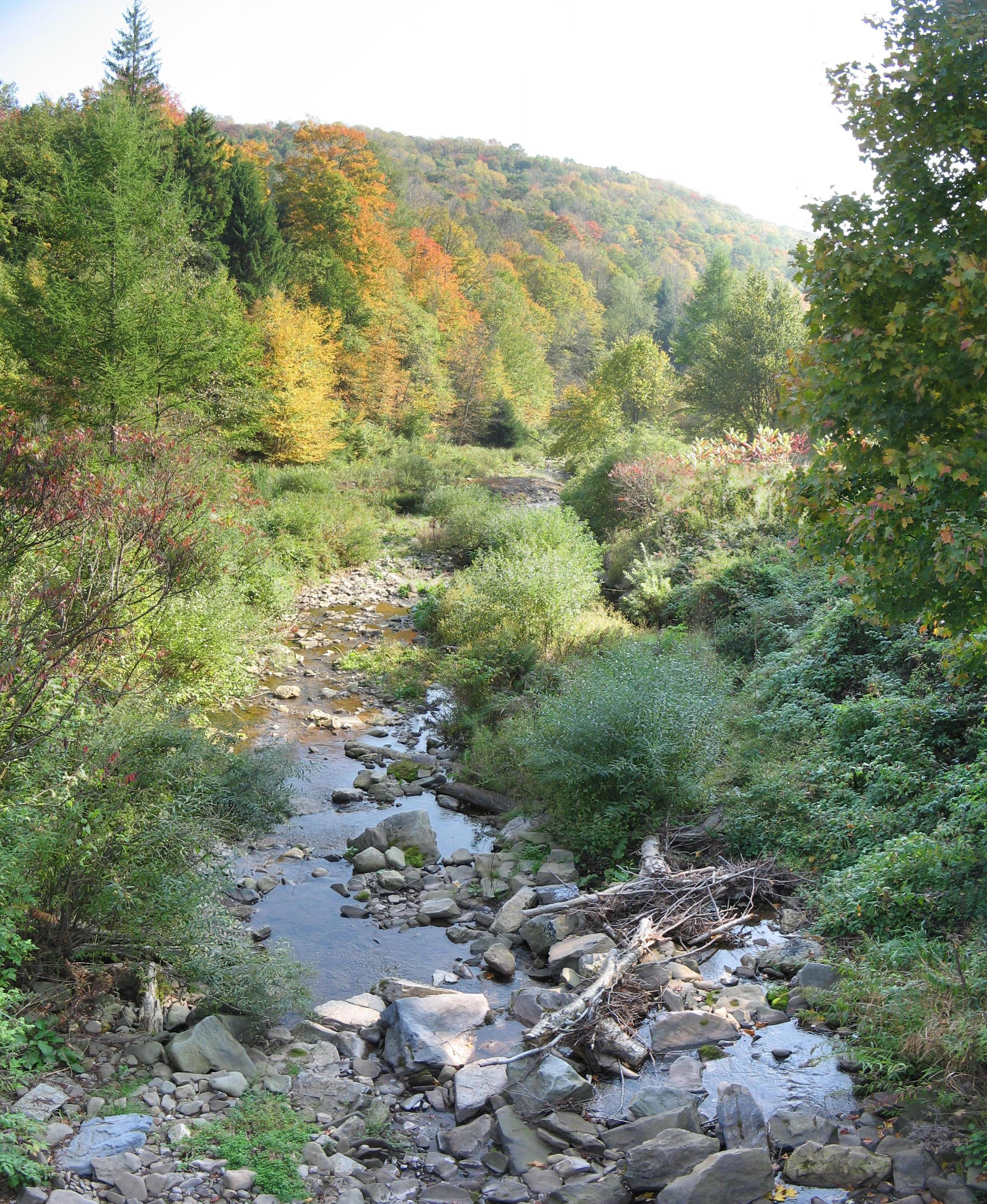
Pleasant Stream in McNett and Cascade townships in Lycoming County

Pleasant Stream is a 13.1-mile-long (21.1 km) tributary of Lycoming Creek in Lycoming and Sullivan counties, Pennsylvania, in the United States.

== See also ==
- List of rivers of Pennsylvania
