= Ralston, Pennsylvania =

Unincorporated community in Pennsylvania, US

- Unincorporated community
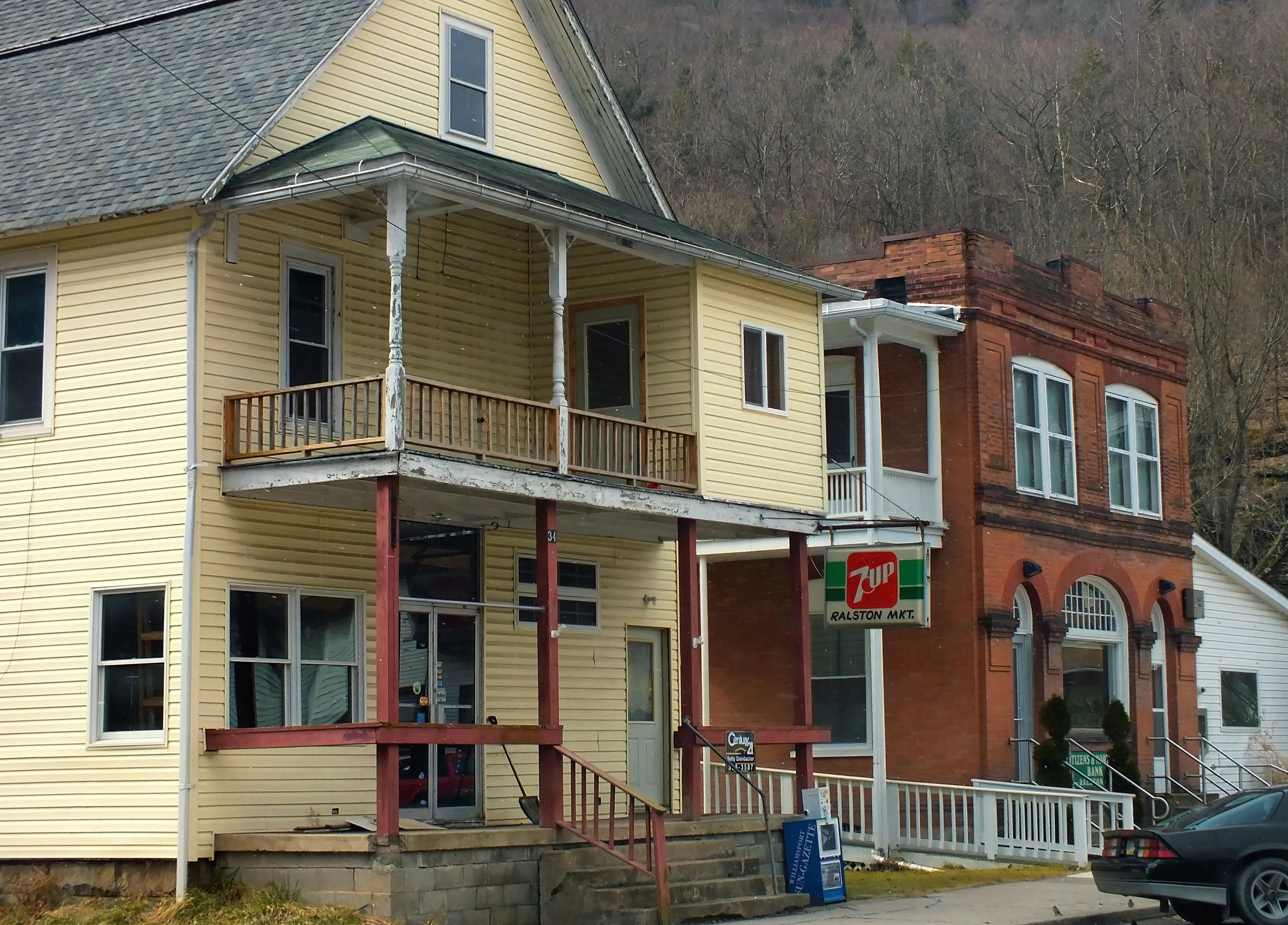
- Ralston in 2012

- Location within Pennsylvania Location within the United States
- Coordinates: 41°30′23″N 76°57′15″W
- Country: United States
- State: Pennsylvania
- County: Lycoming
- Township: McIntyre
- Elevation: 843 ft (257 m)
- Time zone: UTC-5 (Eastern (EST))
  - Summer (DST): UTC-4 (EDT)
- ZIP code: 17763
- Area codes: 272 & 570
- GNIS feature ID: 1184616

Ralston is an unincorporated community in McIntyre Township, Lycoming County, Pennsylvania, United States. The community is located along Pennsylvania Route 14, 18.5 miles (29.8 km) north of Williamsport. Ralston has a post office with ZIP code 17763.

== History ==
Ralston was founded with the construction of the Northern Central Railroad in the 1840s. This would eventually become the Pennsylvania Railroad.

From the beginning, a substantial locomotive terminal was here. The short range of steam locomotives of the time made it a necessity. In addition, there was a steep gradient to Leolyn to the north via Roaring Branch. Most trains required two locomotives or more to climb this hill, and pusher locomotives were based in Ralston.

Around the turn of the 20th century, a tannery sprung up south of Ralston, and this operation soon spawned a logging operation. The Central Pennsylvania Lumber Company, together with the tannery owners, built what would become the Susquehanna & New York Railroad. This line operated passenger services into Ralston to connect with PRR trains, and operated a small yard in South Ralston, close to the tannery. In the beginning, it was very successful, but soon fell on hard times as the local forests were depleted. After a fire destroyed the tannery in the 1920s, the S&NY seldom made a profit, and operated a skeleton service through the 1930s. In 1942, with World War II underway, the Interstate Commerce Commission granted permission for the S&NY to cease operations, and the rails were soon pulled up and used at an ammunition plant in Williamsport.

The CPL Company ran their log trains on a line parallel to the PRR as far as the now-extinct town of Grays Run, where there was a saw mill. This line featured a large wooden trestle crossing Lycoming Creek and the PRR just south of Ralston. When the trees ran out around 1910, the saw mill closed and Grays Run ceased to exist.

The PRR terminal saw great success through the 1910s and 1920s. A nearby mine provided high-quality coal for the PRR's passenger engines, and there were also two small factories. One produced bricks, the other baseball bats. The five-track yard was usually busy, with many coal trains originating and terminating here. There was also a daily high-priority 'symbol freight' to Altoona. Three passenger trains each way called at Ralston six days a week (one was an express for which Ralston was a flag stop). Larger and larger locomotives came into use, and by 1925, L1-class 2-8-2s were the standard power for most freights.

The end came for this vibrant terminal in 1930. With the Great Depression hitting hard and longer-range engines in use, Ralston terminal was closed and the pusher locomotives transferred to Williamsport. The engine terminal, wye track, and other structures associated with the terminal were torn down. The yard was kept to store redundant freight cars, while the siding was still used. The water columns remained.

Around 1935, a coal mining operation began nearby, and two large steam-powered shovels were acquired and transported to the mine. The banks of Rock Run were lowered to allow the machines to pass, and this led to a major flood not long after. The railroad was heavily damaged, but soon repaired.

After the United States entered World War II, the terminal was partially restored. Though pusher locomotives had always taken water here between their runs, the old ashpit track was restored and a platform built for trucks to dump coal into the tenders of locomotives. For a short time, there was a crew assigned for each of three shifts. After some clever accounting by one engineer, the railroad closed the terminal once again.

For the rest of its existence, the Ralston siding remained useful, as it was one of the longest on the Elmira Branch. The station burned to the ground in 1941 and was never rebuilt.

PRR successor Penn Central closed the Elmira Branch in 1972 after floods destroyed a significant portion of the line. Into the 21st century, a truss bridge remained over Lycoming Creek, but was unfortunately removed. Almost nothing remains of either the PRR or S&NY.

Much of Ralston's history is mentioned in the book Set Up Running by John Orr.
