= McNett Township, Pennsylvania =

Township in Pennsylvania, US

McNett Township, Lycoming County, Pennsylvania
- Township
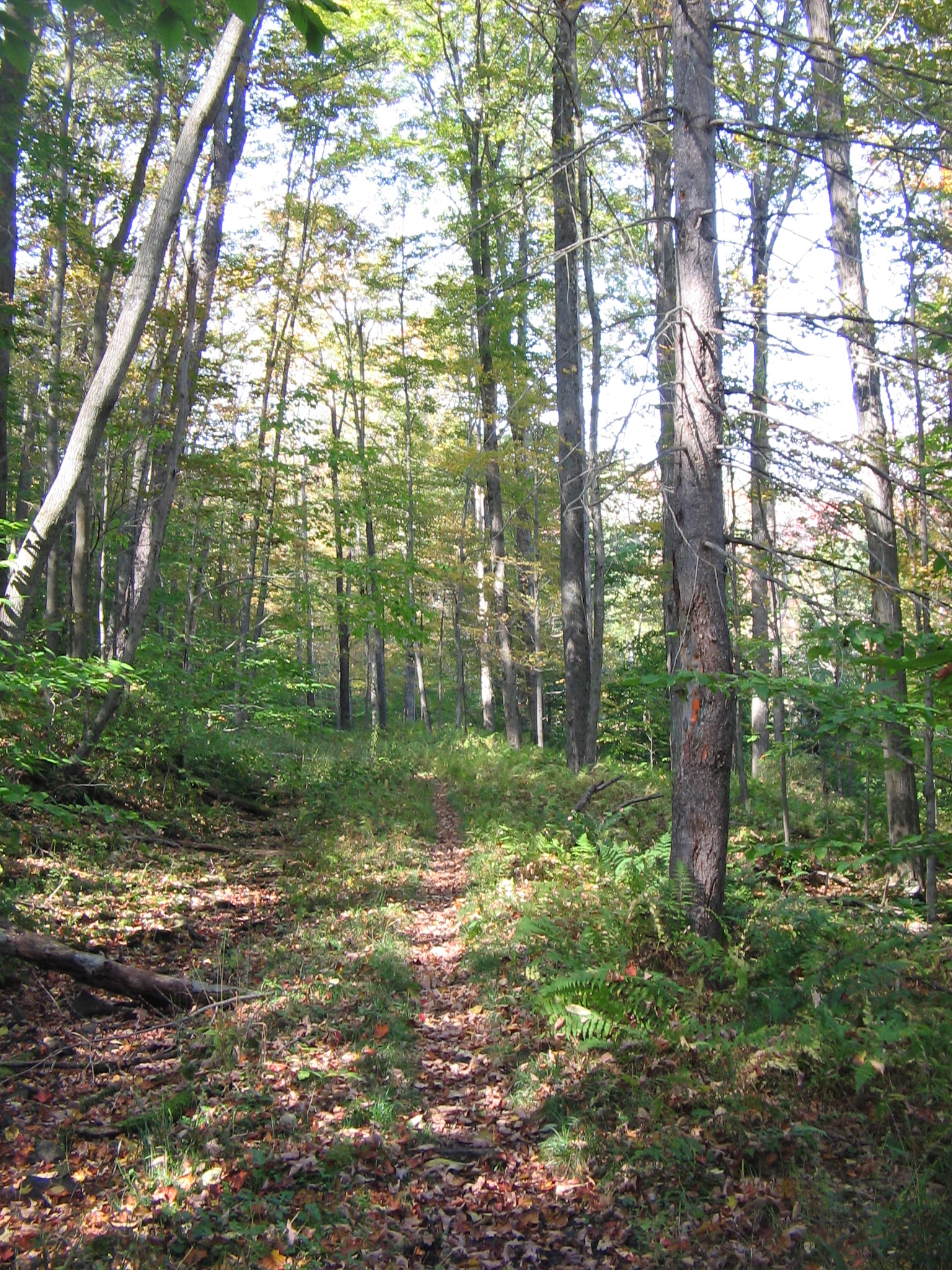
- The Old Loggers Path

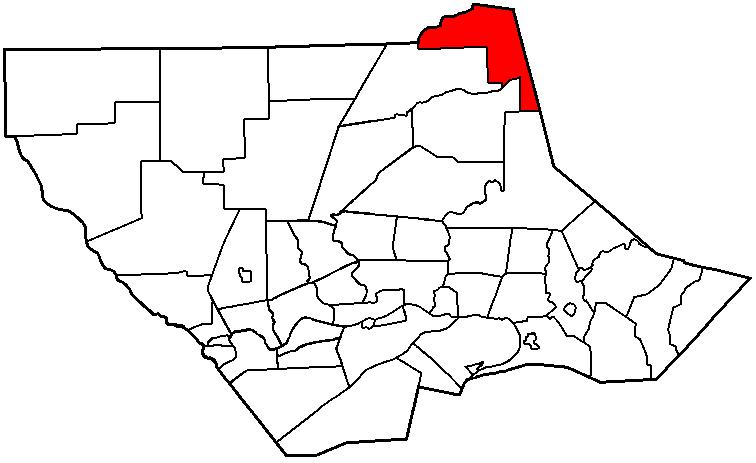
- Map of Lycoming County, Pennsylvania highlighting McNett Township

- Map of Lycoming County, Pennsylvania
- Coordinates: 41°32′22″N 76°49′46″W
- Country: United States
- State: Pennsylvania
- County: Lycoming
- Settled: 1805
- Incorporated: 1878

Area
  - Total: 33.92 sq mi (87.84 km^{2})
  - Land: 33.54 sq mi (86.88 km^{2})
  - Water: 0.37 sq mi (0.97 km^{2})
- Elevation: 1,798 ft (548 m)

Population (2020)
  - Total: 145 ▼
  - Estimate (2021): 144
  - Density: 5.0/sq mi (1.93/km^{2})
- Time zone: UTC-5 (Eastern (EST))
  - Summer (DST): UTC-4 (EDT)
- FIPS code: 42-081-46352
- GNIS feature ID: 1216759

McNett Township is a township in Lycoming County, Pennsylvania, United States. The population was 145 at the 2020 census, down from 174 in 2010. It is part of the Williamsport Metropolitan Statistical Area.

== History ==
McNett Township, in the northeastern corner of Lycoming County, was formed by the county Court of Quarter Sessions of the Peace on February 10, 1878, from McIntyre Township. The formation was a result of a successful petition and election by the citizens of the northeastern corner of Lycoming County who were under the leadership of H. I. McNett, for whom the township was named.

McNett Township has always been a remote portion of Pennsylvania. Farming and industry is at a minimum. Most of the land is mountainous and is covered with a thriving second growth forest. The population which was 619 persons in the 1890 census had fallen to just 174 at the 2010 census.

== Geography ==
McNett Township occupies the northeastern corner of Lycoming County. It is bordered by Tioga County to the northwest, Bradford County to the northeast, and Sullivan County to the east. Within Lycoming County, Plunketts Creek township is to the southeast, Cascade Township is to the south, and McIntyre Township is to the southwest. The township's northwestern boundary, with Tioga County, follows Lycoming Creek, a southwestward-flowing tributary of the West Branch Susquehanna River. No state highways pass through the township, although Pennsylvania Route 14 runs up the Lycoming Creek valley on the Tioga County side of the stream. Williamsport, the Lycoming county seat, is 33 miles (53 km) to the southwest via PA-14 and U.S. Route 15.

According to the United States Census Bureau, McNett Township has a total area of 33.9 square miles (87.8 km^{2}), of which 33.6 square miles (86.9 km^{2}) are land and 0.4 square miles (1.0 km^{2}), or 1.09%, are water. While most of the township is part of the Lycoming Creek watershed, the far southeastern corner of the township drains to Loyalsock Creek, a tributary of the West Branch of the Susquehanna River, while the northeastern corner drains to Towanda Creek, a tributary of the main stem of the Susquehanna.

== Demographics ==
Historical population
Census	Pop.	Note	%±
2010	174		—
2020	145		−16.7%
2021 (est.)	144		−0.7%
U.S. Decennial Census

As of the census of 2000, there were 211 people, 81 households, and 57 families residing in the township. The population density was 6.2 people per square mile (2.4/km^{2}). There were 191 housing units at an average density of 5.7/sq mi (2.2/km^{2}). The racial makeup of the township was 94.31% White, 3.79% African American, 0.95% Native American, and 0.95% from two or more races. Hispanic or Latino of any race were 0.47% of the population.

There were 81 households, out of which 21.0% had children under the age of 18 living with them, 53.1% were married couples living together, 11.1% had a female householder with no husband present, and 29.6% were non-families. 27.2% of all households were made up of individuals, and 8.6% had someone living alone who was 65 years of age or older. The average household size was 2.37 and the average family size was 2.75.

In the township the population was spread out, with 16.1% under the age of 18, 5.7% from 18 to 24, 33.2% from 25 to 44, 22.7% from 45 to 64, and 22.3% who were 65 years of age or older. The median age was 43 years. For every 100 females there were 106.9 males. For every 100 females age 18 and over, there were 105.8 males.

The median income for a household in the township was $22,917, and the median income for a family was $23,068. Males had a median income of $24,750 versus $13,750 for females. The per capita income for the township was $10,556. About 24.5% of families and 29.9% of the population were below the poverty line, including 37.0% of those under the age of eighteen and 17.0% of those sixty five or over.
