= Lycoming Creek =

Coordinates: 41°13′44″N 77°2′26″W

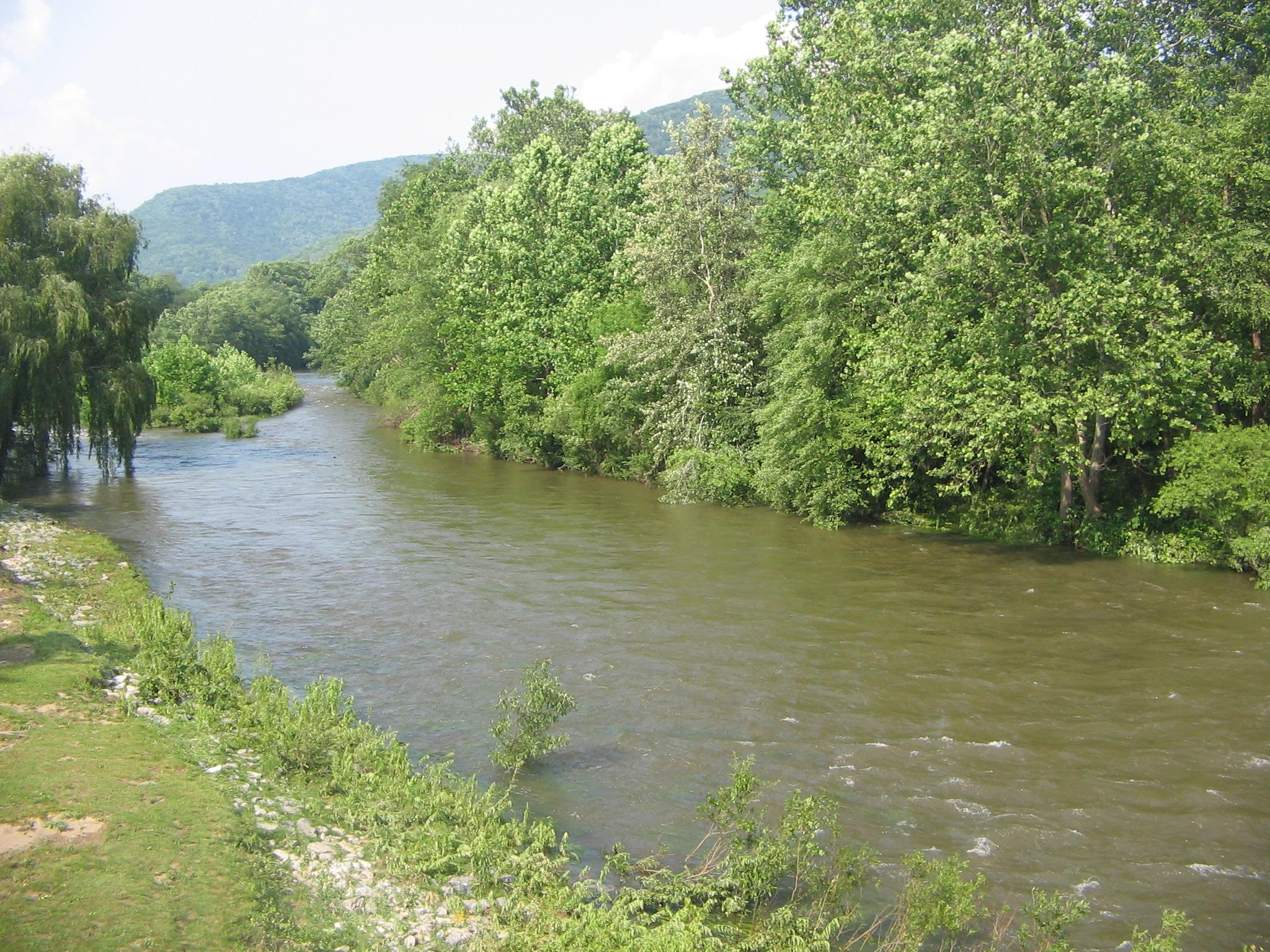
- Lycoming Creek at Trout Run in Lycoming County, Pennsylvania

Location
- Country: Pennsylvania, United States

Physical characteristics
- Source
  - location: near McNett Township, Lycoming County
  - elevation: 2,161 feet (659 m)
- Mouth
  - location: West Branch Susquehanna River, at Williamsport
- Length: 37.5 mi (60.4 km)
- Basin size: 272 mi^{2} (700 km^{2})

Lycoming Creek is a 37.5-mile-long (60.4 km) tributary of the West Branch Susquehanna River located in Tioga and Lycoming counties in Pennsylvania in the United States.

== Geography ==
Lycoming County is about 130 miles (209 km) northwest of Philadelphia and 165 miles (266 km) east-northeast of Pittsburgh. The creek shares its headwaters between Lycoming and Tioga counties, and is 25 miles (40 km) in length from the Tioga County / Lycoming County line in McNett Township to its confluence with the West Branch Susquehanna River at Williamsport. Smaller streams feeding Lycoming Creek include Pleasant Stream, Grays Run, Roaring Branch, Hoagland Run, and Trout Run.

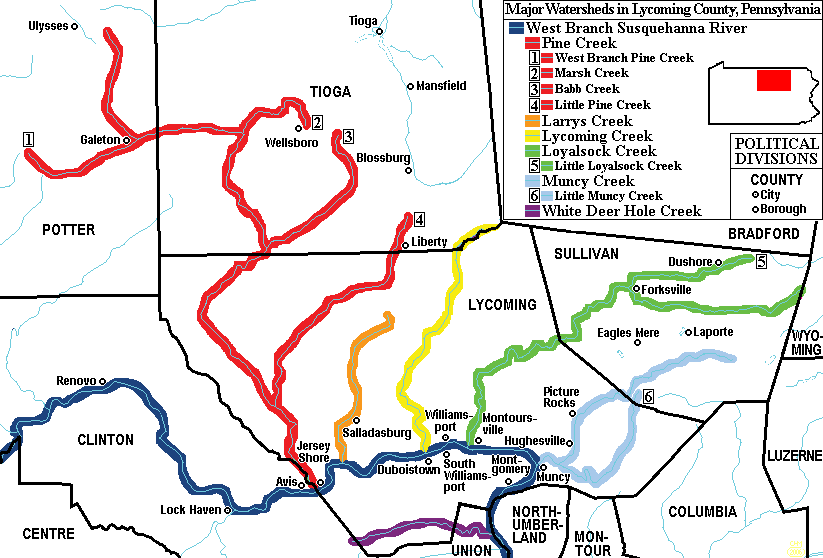
Map of the West Branch Susquehanna River (dark blue) and major streams in Lycoming County, Pennsylvania. Lycoming Creek (yellow) is the third major creek entering the river in the county, between the Larrys Creek (orange) and Loyalsock Creek (green) watersheds.

== Watershed ==
Approximately 81.5% of the Lycoming Creek watershed is in Lycoming County, with 16.5% in Tioga County, and 1.5% in Sullivan County. The watershed has a total population of 19,978 (as of 2000) and a total area of 272 square miles (700 km^{2}). Of that area, 222 square miles (570 km^{2}) are forested, 45 square miles (120 km^{2}) are given to agricultural uses, only 3 square miles (7.8 km^{2}) are developed, and the remaining 1 square mile (2.6 km^{2}) is classified as barren.

=== Recreation ===
Lycoming Creek is a popular site for trout fishing and is usually heavily stocked with fish in the spring, especially in its upper reaches in Lycoming County. Much of the creek runs through heavily wooded areas, including the Tiadaghton State Forest near Grays Run. North of Trout Run, Pennsylvania Route 14 runs parallel to the creek. From Trout Run south to Williamsport, U.S. Route 15 (and old route 15) run parallel to the creek. Historic Bowman Field, home to the minor league baseball Williamsport Crosscutters, is located along the creek near its mouth in the western Newberry section of Williamsport.

== History ==
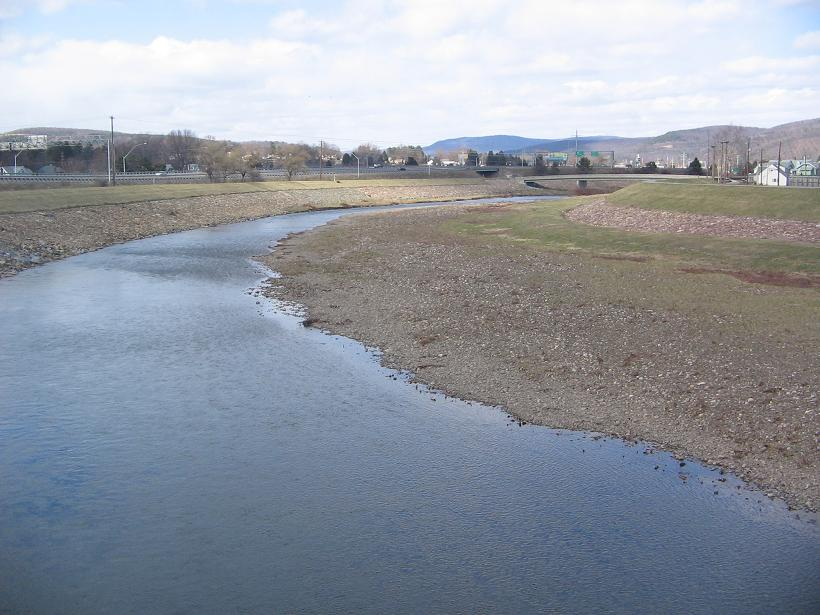
Lycoming Creek in Williamsport, Pennsylvania, near its mouth. Note flood control levees on either side.

Lycoming Creek served as a highway of sorts during the colonial era of Pennsylvania's history. The local Lenape (Delaware) people called it Legani-hanne, meaning "sandy stream" - the name was later rendered by Europeans as Lycaumick and then Lycoming. The stream was used by early explorers and the Native Americans in the area as a means of travel. They were able to float their canoes down the creek and into the West Branch Susquehanna River. This mode of transportation was considerably faster than walking the path.

Conrad Weiser guided Moravian missionaries along the creek and path to reach Onondaga, the capital of the Iroquois Confederacy in 1737. Raiding parties of Indian warriors used the creek and path in 1770 when conducting attacks on the West Branch Susquehanna Valley strongholds of Fort Muncy and Fort Freeland. Fort Freeland was also attacked and captured by Loyalists in July 1779. Colonel Thomas Hartley led the 6th Pennsylvania Regiment up the Sheshequin Path during the American Revolution. Hartley's expedition in 1778 preceded the Sullivan Expedition of 1779. Both Hartley and Sullivan were instrumental in claiming the frontier of Pennsylvania and New York for the forces of the Continental Army. As Hartley and his men passed through Lewis Township the Sheshequin path was widened. The widening of the path helped to open this area to settlement in the years following the Revolution.

In 1839, the Williamsport and Elmira Railroad was built along the creek from Williamsport to Ralston, and was extended to the source of the creek and beyond to Elmira, New York, in 1854. The railroad was reorganized in 1860 as the Elmira and Williamsport Railroad, and came under the control of the Northern Central Railway in 1863, and later the Pennsylvania Railroad. U.S. Route 15 and Pennsylvania Route 14 were later built up the length of the creek. In 1972, flooding caused by Hurricane Agnes washed out several rail bridges and resulted in the abandonment of the railroad north of Hepburnville; the remainder was abandoned in 1986.

There was severe flooding on Lycoming Creek on January 19 and 20, 1996, when a combination of heavy snow on the ground, heavy rains and subsequent melting, and ice dams led to flooding two feet higher than that seen in 1972 with Hurricane Agnes. Six people died as a result of flooding on Lycoming Creek in the greater Williamsport area, and there was millions of dollars of damage to property.

== See also ==
- List of rivers of Pennsylvania
