= Elizabeth Hayes =

American physician (1912–1984)

- Elizabeth Hayes in 1945
- Born: May 7, 1912; Conifer, Pennsylvania
- Died: June 26, 1984 (aged 72); New Bern, North Carolina
- Other name: Elizabeth Hayes Voris
- Known for: Led coal mine strike for public health
- Spouse: LeRoy Voris (m. 1956)

Elizabeth Hayes (7 May 1912 – 26 June 1984), known as Dr. Betty Hayes, was an American physician who drew widespread attention in 1945 for protesting the unsanitary conditions in Force, Pennsylvania, a company-owned coal town where sewage was contaminating the drinking water. Fearing a typhoid outbreak, Hayes, the company doctor, asked her employer, Shawmut Mining Co., to clean up the town and provide another source of water. When Shawmut refused, Hayes quit her job, and 350 miners struck for nearly five months in support of her.

Hayes became an overnight media sensation. Dubbing her "Dr. Betty", reporters and editorial writers described her as a "miners' Joan of Arc." Reluctantly famous, she compared her sudden celebrity to that of Canada's Dionne quintuplets. Virtually all news coverage was sympathetic to the doctor and the strikers, who lived in Force and two other north-central Pennsylvania communities, Byrnedale and Hollywood. Their demands for safe water and clean streets struck a chord with Americans hoping for a bright postwar future.

In the end, investigative reporting into the coal company's finances led to the replacement of its top executives with court-appointed managers. The strike ended as the new management agreed to all of the miners' conditions and rehired Hayes, who was hailed as a "fighter" who "wouldn't wait for an epidemic."

== Early life and education ==
The youngest of eight siblings, Hayes was born in Conifer, Pennsylvania, to Anna Hivick Hayes, a housewife, and Dr. Leo Z. Hayes, who preceded his daughter as the physician employed by Shawmut Mining Co. The company transferred Leo to Force when Betty was a young child, and she attended school in neighboring Weedville, where most of her classmates came from mining families and many would become miners themselves. Like her classmates, Betty lived in company-owned housing, although the "big doc's house" in Force, where Leo worked and raised his family, had running water, piped in from a spring. Most miners' homes lacked indoor plumbing. Families used outdoor privies, situated close to hand-pumped wells that were their only source of water for drinking, washing and other domestic purposes.

Hayes completed her secondary-school education at the Villa Maria Academy in Erie, Pennsylvania, before entering Pennsylvania State College (now Pennsylvania State University) as a pre-med student. After three years at Penn State, she was admitted to Temple University School of Medicine, where two of her siblings were also enrolled at the time and two others taught courses. Hayes was the sixth of the Hayes siblings to study medicine, and the fifth to earn a medical degree (a brother, Francis, died in a car accident in his last year of medical school.) Betty graduated from Temple with honors in 1936 and began an internship at Nesbitt Memorial Hospital in Kingston, Pennsylvania.

Following a brief return to Force, where she assisted her father, Hayes established her own medical office in Kingston and worked as a general practitioner for four years. After the US entered World War II, she obtained a position in the state tuberculosis clinic at Kirby Health Center in Wilkes-Barre, PA, replacing a male physician who had entered military service. Despite her medical degree and years of practice, she was given the modest title of "assistant clinician." After a few months she resigned to volunteer as a physician and tuberculosis researcher at the Grenfell Medical Mission in Newfoundland, Canada, which served remote fishing communities.

== Career as company doctor ==
Two months after Hayes arrived in Newfoundland, she was summoned back to Force. Her father, Leo, had died suddenly from a brain abscess. The people of Force and neighboring coal towns mourned his loss. As a rule, mining families distrusted company doctors, who were known to order sick or injured miners back to work prematurely. Leo, however, had advocated for his patients and their families throughout his four-decade career. Serving on the school board, he had fought to improve and expand the Weedville school. He had also spearheaded the campaign to build a highway that lessened the coal towns' isolation from the outside world. He had achieved such goals over the objections of Shawmut Mining Company, which owned all the property in the area and did not want taxes raised.

Even as he lay dying in December 1942, Leo worried about his patients. Wartime had created a severe shortage of civilian physicians, particularly in rural areas. Caring for miners, their families, and local residents, Leo was the only physician within a twenty-five mile radius with four thousand inhabitants. In a scene later memorialized by Woody Guthrie in his song, "The Dying Doctor" or "The Company Town Doctor", Leo asked his children to assure him that one of them would continue to take care of the miners. The job fell to Betty.

Shawmut Mining opposed her candidacy for the job, promoting its own candidate instead. But Hayes was supported by leaders of the two United Mine Workers of America locals that represented the Shawmut miners. At a union meeting, the miners voted for her unanimously, and she began work in early 1943.

Hayes found conditions in Force "intolerable." Water pumped from the wells smelled rank, and visitors often left the area with stomach ailments. After heavy rains, sewage flowed through the yards and into the unpaved streets where children played. Streets were unlighted, and the walls of houses cracked and sagged. Hayes and the miners arranged to have water samples tested by a private lab, which found contamination in several of the wells. In April 1945, Hayes notified the company of her intention to resign on June 1, explaining that she could not treat patients forced to live under such conditions. In June, the company asked Hayes to postpone her departure until a replacement could be found. She agreed, but the company took no steps to recruit another physician. Finally, Hayes asked the miners to arrange a meeting with management, at which she was present and demanded changes. Angered by her hubris, the company heads abruptly accepted her resignation, and 350 miners struck in support of her.

== Progress of the strike ==
Although no longer employed by Shawmut, Hayes continued to practice medicine in Force, the only available doctor for mining communities and other residents of the area. The miners paid her directly instead of through paycheck deductions. With its two principal mines idle, Shawmut Mining was losing one thousand tons of coal production daily. Also affected was Shawmut's parent company, the Pittsburg, Shawmut & Northern Railroad, which derived most of its revenue from coal-hauling fees paid by Shawmut, its wholly owned subsidiary. Still, the company refused to negotiate with the miners with Hayes present, and the miners refused to exclude her.

On July 31, the Pittsburgh Press ran a story about Hayes and her resignation, which was widely distributed by wire services. The story drew immediate attention, and reporters from near and far descended on Force. As the service publication Stars and Stripes covered the controversy, fan mail arrived from all over the world. Editorial writers unanimously praised Hayes's courage.

The Pennsylvania state health department visited Force again, this time confirming that the wells were contaminated. But, pointing to the limits of state law, health authorities took no action against Shawmut. They did little beyond treating the wells with disinfectant and advising residents to boil the water. Dissatisfied, Hayes and the miners continued their protest past V-J Day. Threats to their unity appeared as time wore on, the miners' savings dwindled, and Shawmut continued to insist that it had no funds for improvements. The strikers and the doctor began to consider leaving the area in a mass migration.

Hope revived for them as the Pittsburgh Post-Gazette ran a three-part series. The final installment took a close look at the finances of Shawmut's parent, the PS&N Railroad, which had spent forty years in receivership, believed to be the lengthiest receivership then on record. The series was written by Pulitzer Prize-winning reporter Ray Sprigle, who revealed that the PS&N receiver had drawn a handsome salary for years while taking no steps to sell the railroad's assets or find a way to operate it profitably. The receiver, John D. Dickson, was incensed by the series written by Sprigle, who had tried, without success, to get interviews with Dickson and other Shawmut officials. After the series ran, Dickson cut off all communication with the media, a step that may have ultimately worked against his interests.

Responding to a telegram from the miners asking for help, President Harry S. Truman referred the matter to his Attorney General, Tom C. Clark. Clark assigned federal judge Guy K. Bard to investigate the corporate finances. Around this time, Hayes returned to her office from a housecall and found company officials moving her medical equipment and patient files onto a van. The company was evicting her from the doctor's residence and office, saying they had found a replacement for her. Hayes immediately brought charges against the men, including forcible entry. The press again converged on the area as Hayes continued seeing patients in the kitchen of a miner's home.

After investors in the PS&N railroad sued to remove Dickson as receiver, Judge Bard invited Hayes and several strike leaders to a federal court hearing in Pittsburgh on the matter. Photographers struggled to take pictures of Hayes, who ran from the cameras. She and a miner testified and were widely quoted. Bard replaced the two company heads with his own appointees, who agreed to all the miners' demands and rehired Hayes. The miners voted to end the strike and resumed work in early December as the streets of Force were paved for the first time. Even the business press pronounced Hayes the victor.

Reorganizing their coal subsidiary as New Shawmut Mining Co., the new receivers agreed to help the miners buy their homes and install indoor plumbing or make other improvements. Housing corporations were formed in the three communities affected by the strike—Force, Byrnedale, and Hollywood. But, as the New Shawmut receivers sought buyers for the railroad and the mining concern, the deeds to the houses became entangled in those transactions. In the end, a salvage company bought the railroad for scrap and sold New Shawmut to a coal operator, Antonio John "A. J." Palumbo, who would later become known as a wealthy philanthropist. In the summer of 1947, the people of the area hosted a farewell picnic for Hayes as dozens of mining families received deeds to their homes.

== Later life and career ==
After leaving Force, Hayes married and worked as a civilian physician at the Cherry Point Marine Air Base in North Carolina. While her husband served in Korea, she moved to Brockway, Pennsylvania, and joined another physician's practice under the name Betty Hayes Williamson. That marriage ended in divorce. In 1956 she married LeRoy Voris, an agricultural researcher for the National Academy of Science, who was widowed with three sons. The couple lived in the Washington, DC, area until retiring to Pine Knolls Shores in Carteret County, NC. In 1984 Elizabeth Hayes Voris died of a stroke at age 72.

== Legacy ==
Hayes's widely reported struggle provided the impetus for Truman to commission the first-ever nationwide survey of sanitation, housing, and access to medical care in coal mining areas. Initiated in 1946 and published the following year by the US Department of the Interior, A Medical Survey of the Bituminous-Coal Industry revealed the shocking conditions of dozens of coal towns. The report included scores of pictures taken by the noted photographer Russell Lee. However, the publication refrained from citing the names and locations of the coal towns photographed and described. Therefore, no one was held responsible for the deplorable state of "Coaltown USA"—the survey's evasive name for all such communities. The survey also took pains to contrast the worst of these towns with the best, showcasing the small number of newer "model" communities built by coal operators. Rear Admiral Joel T. Boone headed the survey, in which Hayes took no part and Force is not mentioned.

Despite its lack of specificity, the findings of the survey helped the United Mine Workers of America establish a health and welfare fund, financed by coal-sale royalties, which had long been a goal of its president, John L. Lewis. Lewis never acknowledged Hayes's contributions and remained officially neutral during the strike in Force. At the time, the national union contract did not cover health and sanitation issues, and Lewis neither authorized the strike nor tried to end it. However, the official union publication, the United Mine Workers Journal, ran approving pieces about it. After the miners returned to work, the Journal ran a list of contract changes proposed by the Force strike leaders, including demands for safe sewage disposal and pure water.

In 1946 the board of trustees of the Medical Society of the State of Pennsylvania unanimously commended Hayes for "her untiring and unselfish efforts", noting that the prime duty of a physician is "to guard public health" for which "pure and potable water and proper disposal of sewage" are essential.

On Labor Day of 2023, state and local officials in Jay Township, Elk County, unveiled signs designating a portion of Route 255 as The Dr. Betty Hayes Memorial Highway by an act of the Pennsylvania General Assembly. Announcing the highway naming, State Rep. Mike Armanini said Hayes “devoted years of her life to fight against the inhumane conditions of the mining town she called home.”
