= Conifer (disambiguation) =

Conifer may refer to:

- Conifers, cone-bearing seed plants
- Conifer, Colorado, an unincorporated town in the United States
  - Conifer High School
- Conifer, Pennsylvania, an unincorporated community
- Conifer Grove, a suburb of Auckland, New Zealand
- Taiga, a biome characterized by coniferous forests
- USCGC Conifer (WLB-301), a U.S. Coast Guard seagoing buoy tender
