= Pennsylvania Route 120 =

State highway in Pennsylvania, US

Pennsylvania Route 120

- Highways in Pennsylvania with PA 120 in red.

Route information
- Maintained by PennDOT
- Length: 103.886 mi (167.188 km)
- Existed: 1926 (as US 120)–present
- Tourist routes: Bucktail Trail Scenic Byway

Major junctions
- West end: US 219 / PA 948 in Ridgway
- PA 255 in St. Marys PA 46 in Emporium; PA 155 near Emporium; PA 555 in Driftwood; PA 872 near Jericho PA 144 in Renovo
- East end: Future I-99 / US 220 near Lock Haven

Location
- Country: United States
- State: Pennsylvania
- Counties: Elk, Cameron, Clinton

Highway system
- Pennsylvania State Route System; Interstate; US; State; Scenic; Legislative
← US 119	→ PA 121

Pennsylvania Route 120 (PA 120) is a state highway located in north-central Pennsylvania in the United States. It stretches from U.S. Route 219 (US 219) in Ridgway east to US 220 near Lock Haven.

== Bucktail State Park Natural Area ==
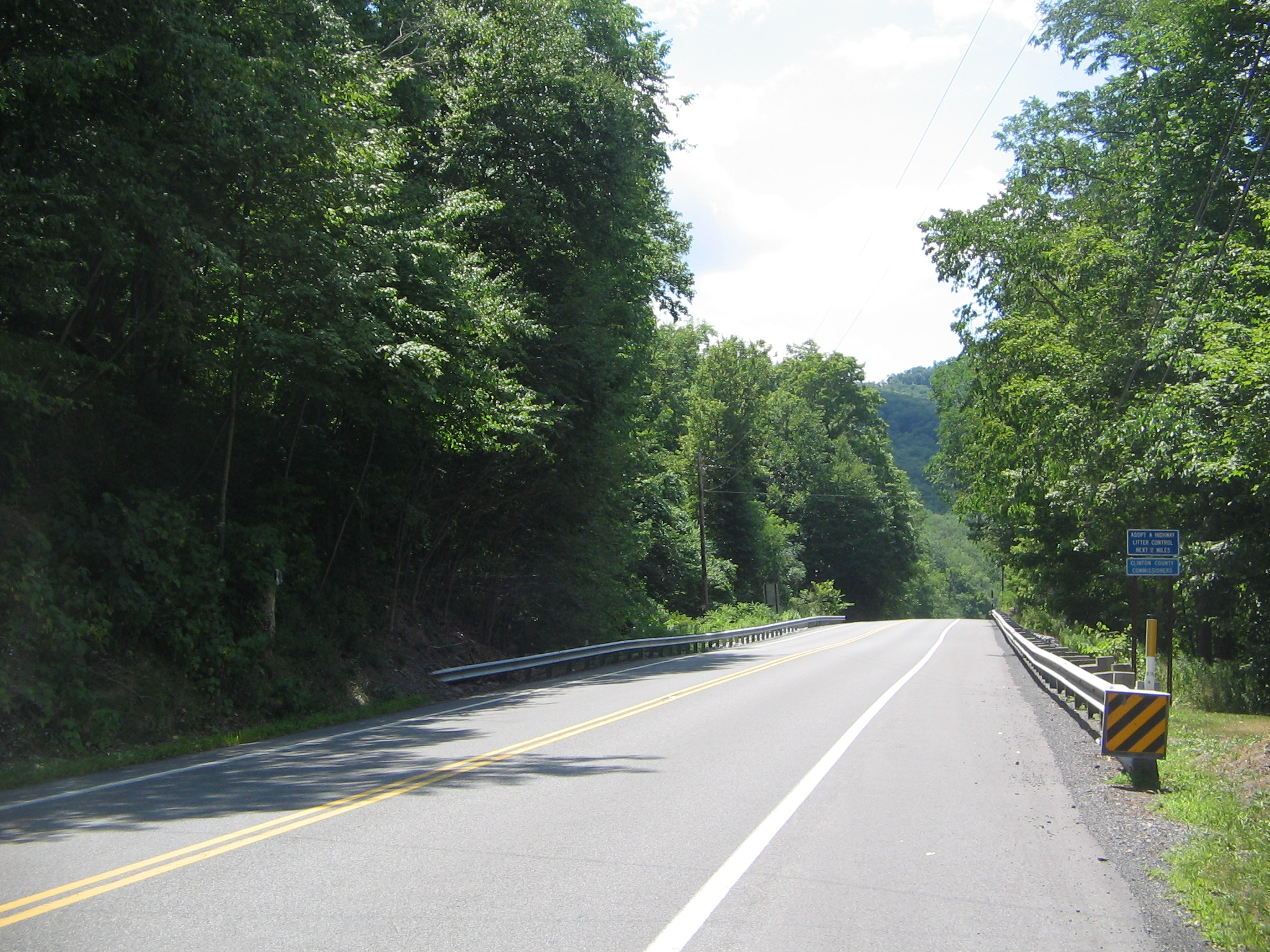
PA 120 in Clinton County, at the western end of Bucktail State Park Natural Area

In much of Cameron and Clinton counties, PA 120 is a Pennsylvania Scenic Byway designated the Bucktail State Park Natural Area. Bucktail State Park Natural Area runs 75 miles (121 km) from Emporium to Lock Haven, and is named for the Pennsylvania Bucktails Regiment, who came from the area during the American Civil War. PA 120 and the park run along Sinnemahoning Creek and the West Branch Susquehanna River and also pass through Renovo (in Clinton County).

Bucktail State Park Natural Area was established by the Pennsylvania State Legislature in 1933. It includes 21,039 acres (85.14 km^{2}), of which 9,239 acres (37.39 km^{2}) are in Cameron County and 11,800 acres (47.75 km^{2}) in Clinton County. While much of the land is state owned and part of the Elk and Sproul State Forests, there are also many tracts of privately owned land within the official boundaries of the park.

The law establishing the park defined its boundaries as "all that area of land extending in length from the western city line of Lock Haven, in Clinton County, to the eastern borough line of Emporium, in the Cameron County, and along the course of the western branch of the Susquehanna River, and its tributary, Sinnemahoning Creek, in Clinton and Cameron counties, an estimated distance of 75 miles, and in width from mountain rim to mountain rim across the valley." The park is primarily dedicated to wildlife viewing, especially elk.

== History ==
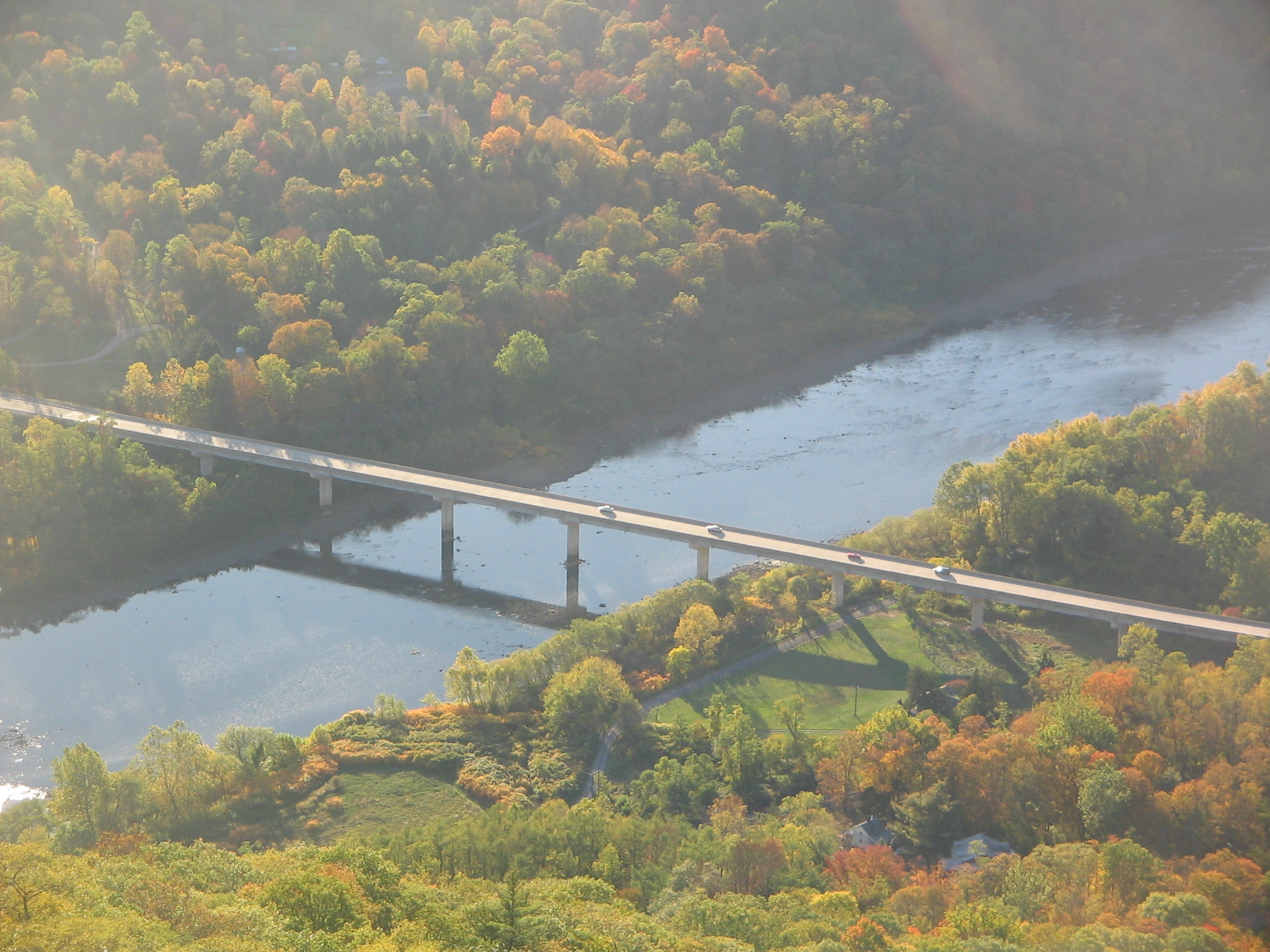
The PA 120 bridge over the West Branch Susquehanna River, as seen from Hyner View State Park in Clinton County

PA 120 follows an old Native American Trail, the Sinnemahoning Path. This trail was used by Native Americans to cross the eastern continental divide (specifically the Allegheny Front) between the Susquehanna River (which drains into the Chesapeake Bay) and the Allegheny River (which forms the Ohio River with the Monongahela River at Pittsburgh and eventually drains into the Gulf of Mexico via the Mississippi River). American Pioneers also used the trail to make their way west and it was also known as the Bucktail Trail.

U.S. Route 120
- Location: Ridgway – Lock Haven
- Existed: 1926–1967

PA 120 was U.S. Route 120 until ca. 1967. US 120 was initially planned in 1926 as an Erie–Philadelphia route, but was truncated to Ridgway–Reading in 1927, the route west of Ridgway primarily becoming an extension of US 6 and that to the east of Reading becoming the eastern segment of US 422. The portion east of Lock Haven of the remainder of the route became US 220, US 15, and US 122 ca. 1935; this alignment is now roughly followed by US 220, I-180, PA 147, and PA 61.

== Major intersections ==
County	Location	mi	km	Destinations	Notes
Elk	Ridgway	0.000	0.000	US 219 / PA 948 (Main Street) – Kersey, Brockway, Bradford, Warren	Western terminus
Elk	Ridgway	0.235	0.378	US 219 Truck north (Osterhaut Street)	Western end of US 219 Truck northbound concurrency
Elk	Ridgway Township	1.183	1.904	US 219 Truck	Eastern end of US 219 Truck northbound concurrency; US 219 Truck northbound one-way only
Elk	St. Marys	10.163	16.356	PA 255 south (South St. Marys Street) – DuBois	Western end of PA 255 concurrency
Elk	St. Marys	10.363	16.678	PA 255 north (North Michael Street) – Johnsonburg	Eastern end of PA 255 concurrency
Cameron	Emporium	29.142	46.900	PA 46 north (Woodland Avenue) – Smethport	Southern terminus of PA 46
Cameron	Shippen Township	30.550	49.165	PA 155 north (Sizerville Road) – Port Allegany	Southern terminus of PA 155
Cameron	Driftwood	47.597	76.600	PA 555 west (Chestnut Street) – Weedville	Eastern terminus of PA 555
Cameron	Grove Township	51.355	82.648	PA 872 north (First Fork Road) – Austin	Southern terminus of PA 872
Clinton	Renovo	73.945	119.003	PA 144 north (Tamarack Road) – Galeton	Western end of PA 144 concurrency
Clinton	Renovo	75.503	121.510	PA 144 south (Birch Street) – Moshannon	Eastern end of PA 144 concurrency
Clinton	Lock Haven	103.073	165.880	PA 664 north (North Jay Street) / East Water Street – Swissdale	Southern terminus of PA 664
Clinton	Lock Haven	103.148	166.001	PA 150 south (East Main Street) – Lock Haven University	One-way pair on PA 150
Clinton	Lock Haven	103.224	166.123	PA 150 north (East Church Street)	One-way pair on PA 150
Clinton	Lock Haven	103.509– 103.575	166.582– 166.688	Walnut Street	Interchange; no access to westbound PA 120
Clinton	Castanea Township	103.759– 103.886	166.984– 167.188	Future I-99 / US 220 to I-80 – Milesburg, Williamsport	Eastern terminus; exit 111 on US 220
1.000 mi = 1.609 km; 1.000 km = 0.621 mi: Concurrency terminus; Incomplete access

== Gallery ==
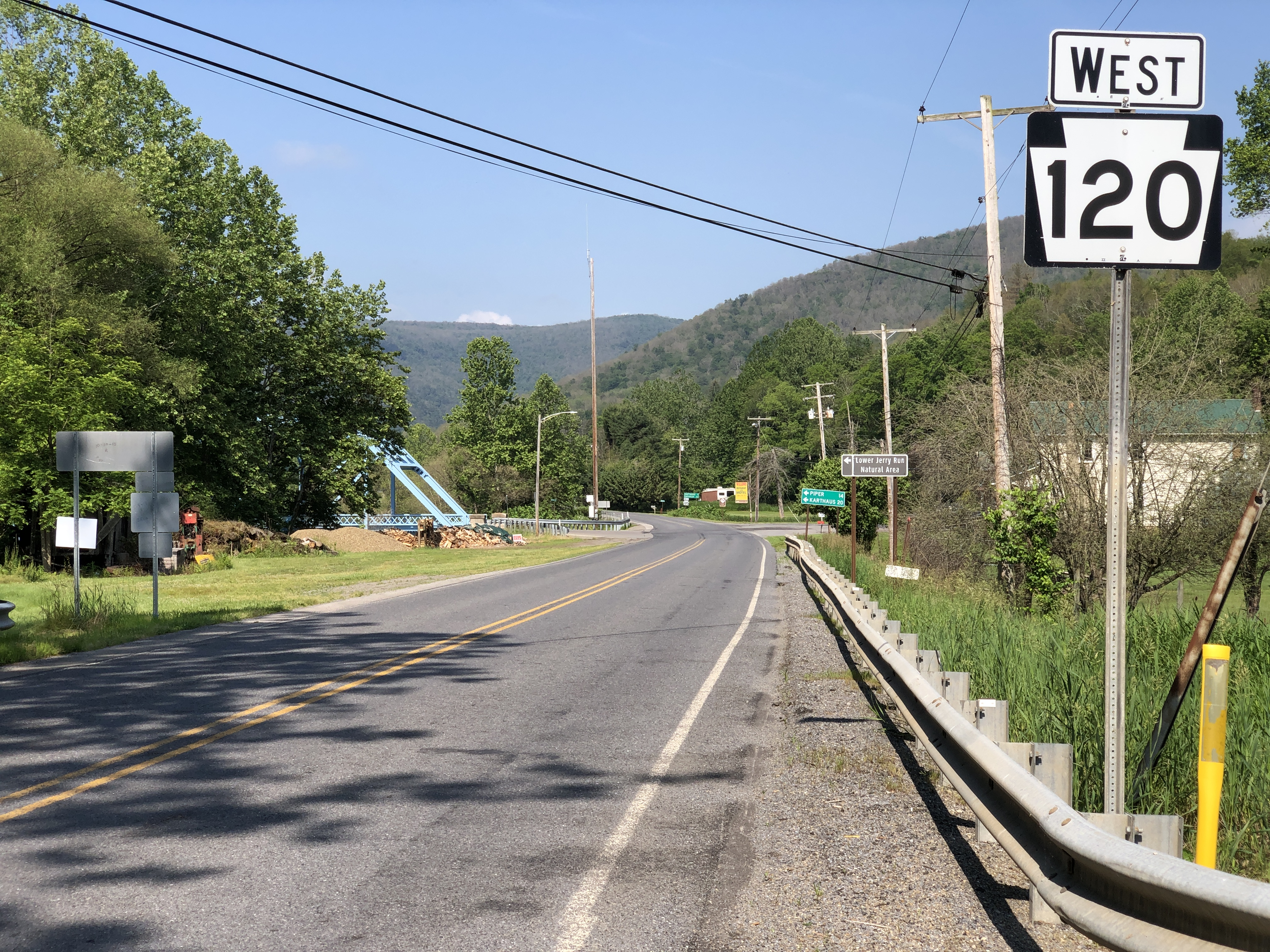
PA 120 westbound at PA 872 in Grove Township

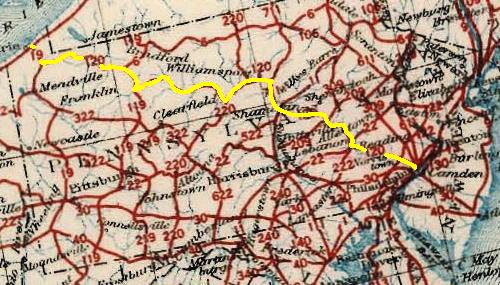
US 120 in the "final" 1926 plan; it was truncated to Ridgway-Reading in 1927
