= Pennsylvania Route 255 =

State highway in Pennsylvania, US

Pennsylvania Route 255

Route information
- Maintained by PennDOT
- Length: 39.7 mi (63.9 km)

Major junctions
- South end: US 219 in DuBois
- I-80 near DuBois; PA 153 in Huston Township; PA 555 in Jay Township; PA 948 near St. Marys; PA 120 in St. Marys
- North end: US 219 in Johnsonburg

Location
- Country: United States
- State: Pennsylvania
- Counties: Clearfield, Elk

Highway system
- Pennsylvania State Route System; Interstate; US; State; Scenic; Legislative
← PA 254	→ PA 256

Pennsylvania Route 255 (PA 255) is a 39.7-mile-long (63.9 km) state highway located in Clearfield and Elk counties in Pennsylvania. The southern terminus is at U.S. Route 219 (US 219) in DuBois. The northern terminus is at US 219 in Johnsonburg.

== Route description ==
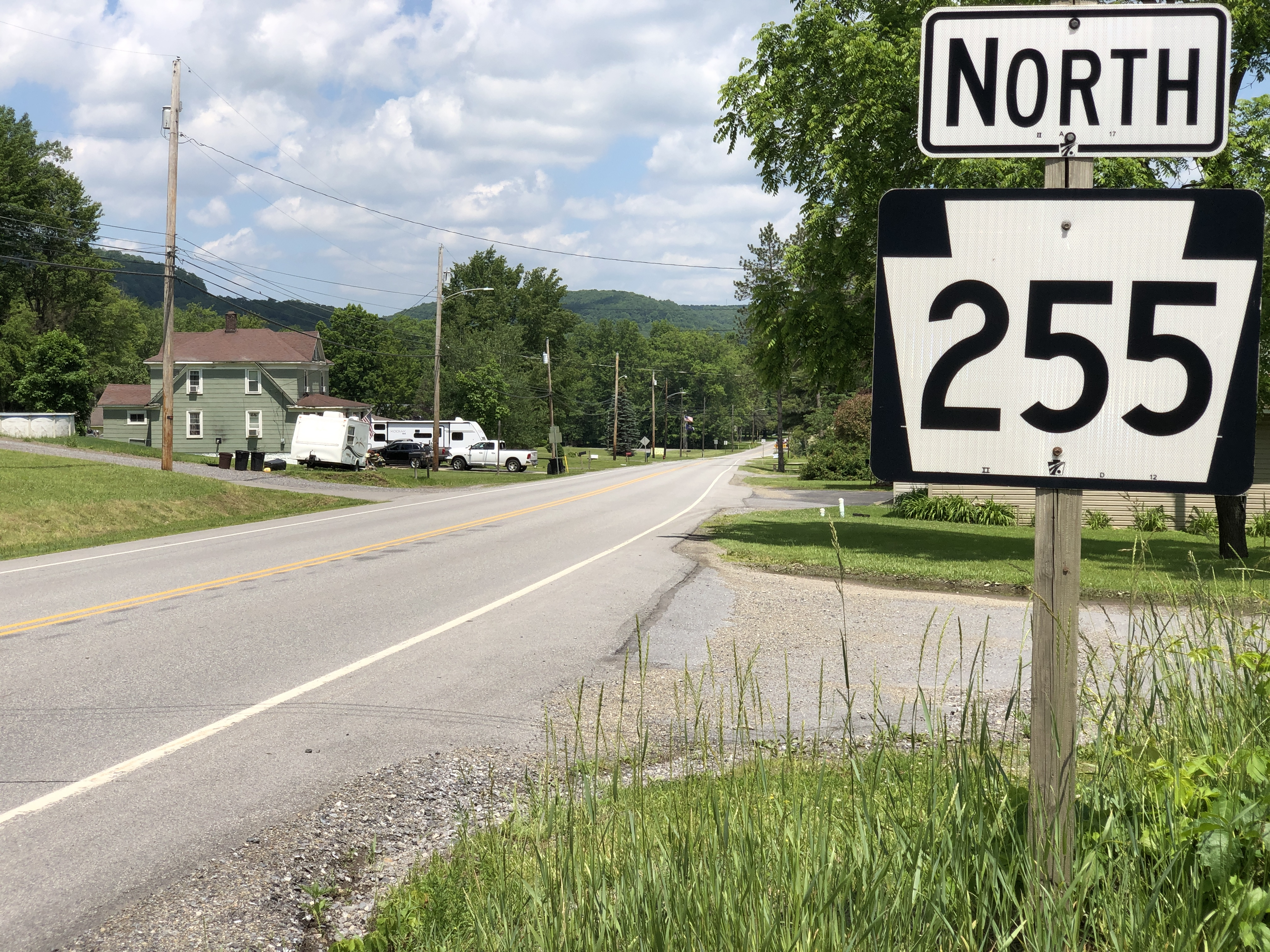
PA 255 northbound at PA 555 in Jay Township

=== Clearfield County ===
PA 255 begins at an intersection with US 219 in the city of DuBois in Clearfield County, heading east on two-lane undivided East DuBois Avenue. The road runs immediately to the north of a Buffalo and Pittsburgh Railroad line and passes to the south of the Penn State DuBois university campus, gaining a center left-turn lane and heading through commercial areas with some homes. The route becomes the border between Sandy Township to the north and DuBois to the south, passing more businesses and coming to Shaffer. At this point, PA 255 becomes Bee Line Highway and heads northeast through wooded areas with some commercial development, coming to an interchange with I-80. Past this interchange, the road becomes two lanes and runs through more woodland with some fields and development. The route turns north and heads through the community of Sabula, where the railroad tracks turn east away from the road and the road runs to the west of Lake Sabula. PA 255 turns northeast and crosses into Huston Township, becoming Bennetts Valley Highway and continues through more forests with some patches of fields. The road passes through agricultural areas before heading into the residential community of Penfield and intersecting PA 153. From here, the route heads through a mix of woodland and farmland with some homes, passing through Mill Run and Hollywood.

=== Elk County ===
PA 255 enters Jay Township in Elk County and continues through agricultural and wooded areas with some residences, heading through Scattertown and Force. The road turns north through more rural areas and comes to a junction with the western terminus of PA 555. The route runs through rural areas of development and passes through Byrnedale, heading into forested areas with occasional fields and curving to the northwest and becoming Million Dollar Highway. After a turn to the west, PA 255 continues into Fox Township and turns northwest, coming to an intersection with PA 948. The road becomes a four-lane divided highway and heads north through a mix of farmland and woodland with areas of housing. At the intersection with Old Kersey Road, the route becomes a five-lane road with a center left-turn lane and passes a few businesses. PA 255 heads into the city of St. Marys and becomes South St. Marys Road, heading past a mix of rural homes and businesses, becoming a four-lane undivided road. The route gains a center left-turn lane and runs past more commercial establishments before heading into residential areas on four-lane undivided South St. Marys Street. PA 255 heads into the commercial downtown of St. Marys and intersects PA 120, forming a concurrency with that route and becoming a four-lane divided highway.

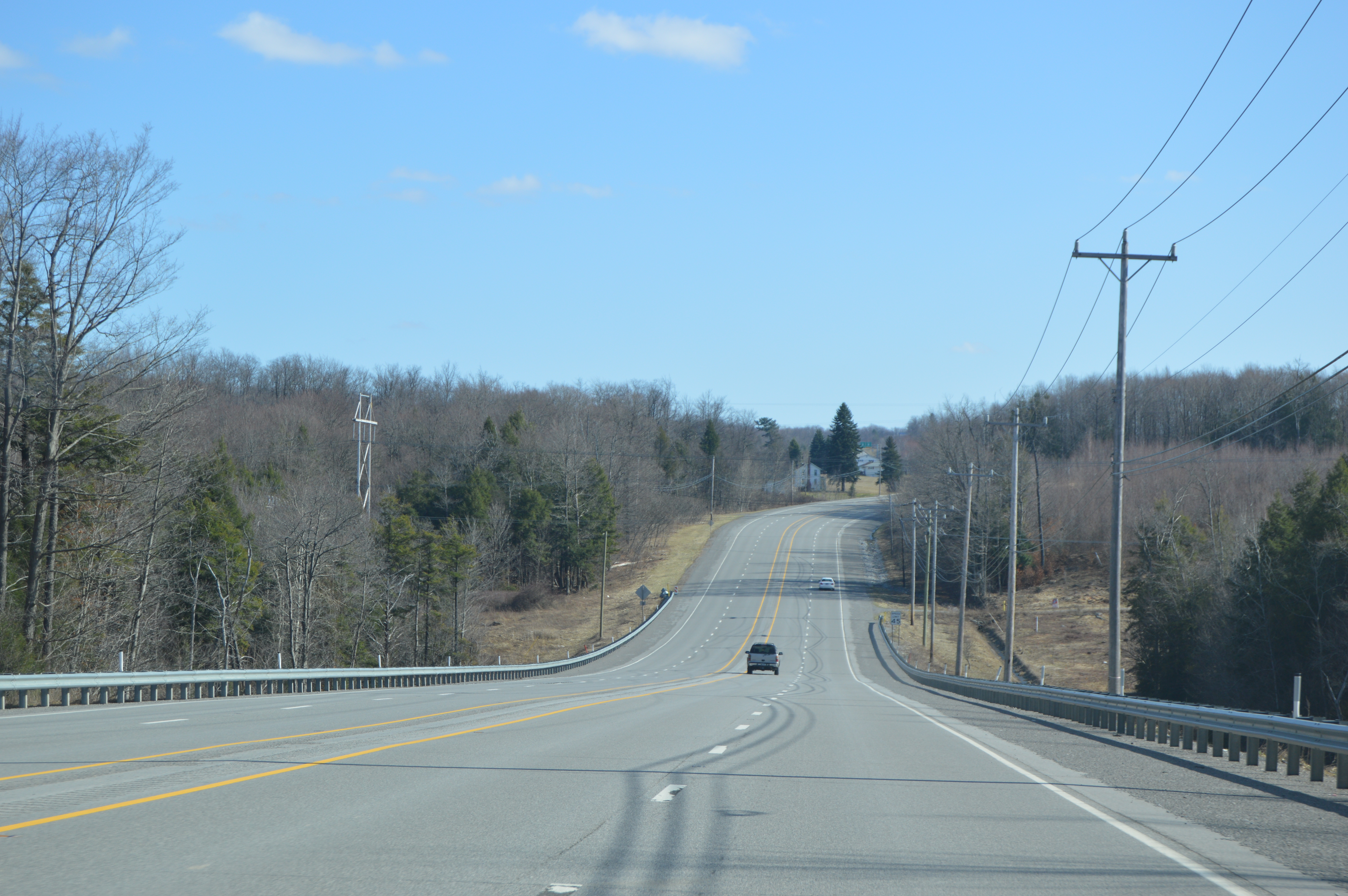
PA 255 just south of St. Marys

PA 120/PA 255 becomes a one-way pair, with westbound PA 120/southbound PA 255 following one-way North St. Marys Street and eastbound PA 120/northbound PA 255 heading northeast on one-way Railroad Street, running to the south of a Buffalo and Pittsburgh Railroad line. At the intersection with Michael Street, PA 120 splits to the east and PA 255 northbound heads northwest along with westbound PA 120 on one-way North Michael Street, crossing the railroad tracks. North St. Marys Street also crosses the railroad tracks and comes to an intersection with North Michael Street, at which point PA 255 splits from westbound PA 120 and heads northwest on two-lane, two-way North Michael Street. The route soon turns west-southwest onto Maurus Street, passing homes. PA 255 curves north-northwest onto Johnsonburg Road and passes Elk Regional Health Center St. Marys Campus before passing through more residential areas. The road continues northwest into forested areas with occasional fields and homes. The route turns north into more forested areas, curving west and becoming a three-lane road with two southbound lanes and one northbound lane. The road becomes two lanes again and turns northwest, entering Ridgway Township and turning west again. PA 255 heads into the borough of Johnsonburg and becomes Powers Avenue, heading west-southwest past homes before ending at US 219.

== Major intersections ==
County	Location	mi	km	Destinations	Notes
Clearfield	DuBois	0.0	0.0	US 219 (Dubois Avenue/Liberty Boulevard)	Southern teminus of PA 255
Clearfield	Sandy Township	2.6	4.2	I-80 – Sharon, Bellefonte	Exit 101 (I-80)
Clearfield	Huston Township	12.2	19.6	PA 153 (Toby Road) – Ridgway, Clearfield	
Elk	Jay Township	18.7	30.1	PA 555 east (River Road) – Driftwood	Western terminus of PA 555
Elk	Fox Township	26.9	43.3	PA 948 north – Kersey, Ridgway	Southern terminus of PA 948
Elk	St. Marys	31.0	49.9	PA 120 west (State Street) – Ridgway	South end of PA 120 concurrency
Elk	St. Marys	31.3	50.4	PA 120 east (Michael Street) – Emporium	North end of PA 120 concurrency; access to St. Marys Municipal Airport
Elk	Johnsonburg	39.7	63.9	US 219 (Buffalo Pittsburgh Highway) – Ridgway, Bradford	Northern terminus of PA 255
1.000 mi = 1.609 km; 1.000 km = 0.621 mi: Concurrency terminus
