= Pennsylvania Route 555 =

State highway in Pennsylvania, US

Pennsylvania Route 555

Route information
- Maintained by PennDOT
- Length: 26.332 mi (42.377 km)

Major junctions
- West end: PA 255 in Jay Township
- East end: PA 120 in Driftwood

Location
- Country: United States
- State: Pennsylvania
- Counties: Elk, Cameron

Highway system
- Pennsylvania State Route System; Interstate; US; State; Scenic; Legislative
← PA 554	→ PA 562

Pennsylvania Route 555 (PA 555) is a 26.3-mile-long (42.3 km) state highway located in Elk and Cameron counties in Pennsylvania. The western terminus is at PA 255 in Jay Township community of Weedville. The eastern terminus is at PA 120 in Driftwood.

== Route description ==
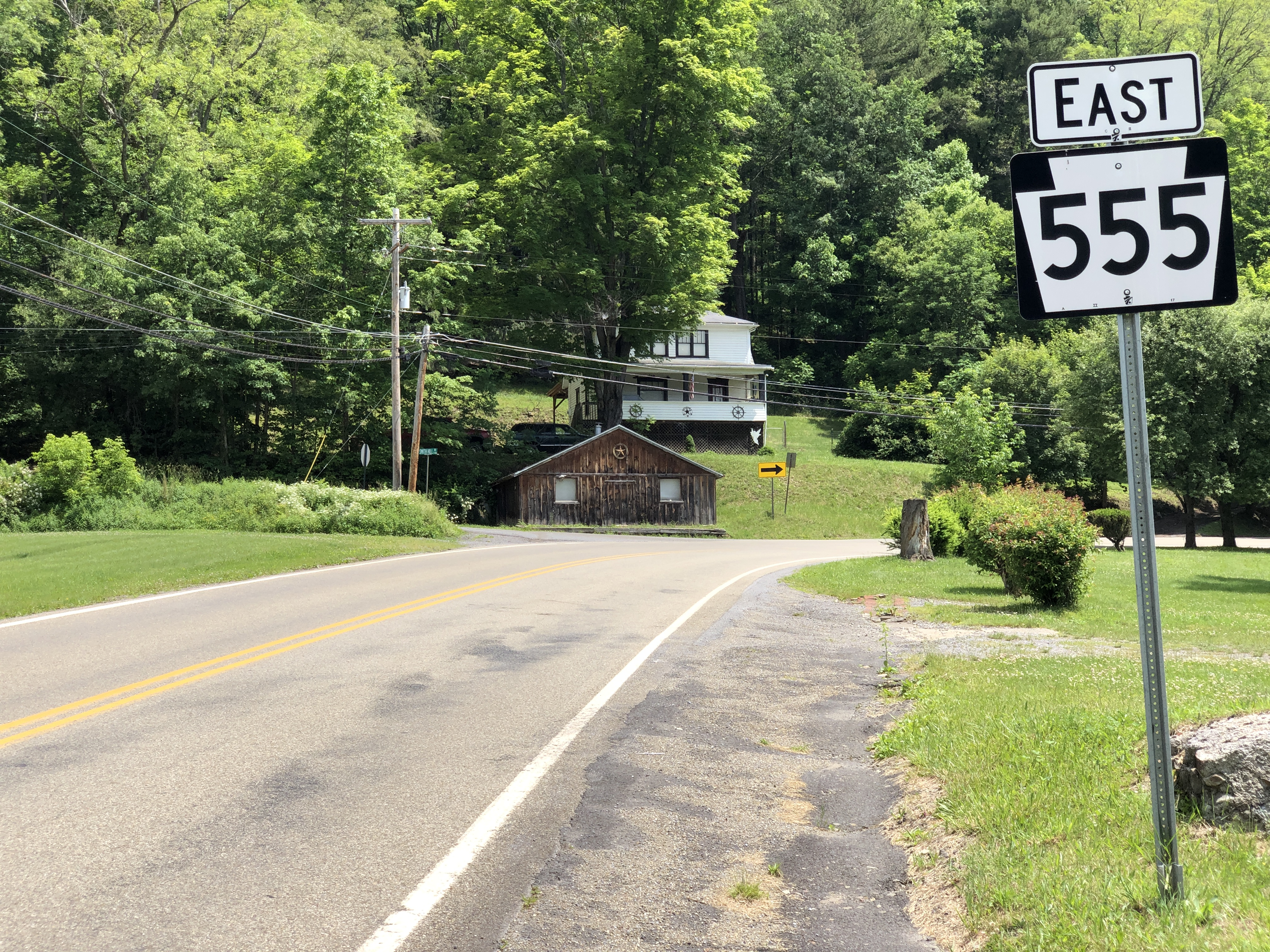
PA 555 eastbound in Jay Township

PA 555 begins at an intersection with PA 255 in Jay Township, Elk County, heading northeast on two-lane undivided River Road. The road heads through rural residential areas, passing through the community of Weedville and turning to the east. The route winds through forested areas, running to the north of the Bennett Branch Sinnemahoning Creek and a Buffalo and Pittsburgh Railroad line. PA 555 passes through Caledonia and heads through more wooded areas with occasional fields, crossing into Benezette Township and becomes an unnamed road, curving to the northeast. The road runs through Medix Run and continues through forests, heading northwest before turning east and coming to Benezette. The route winds east-northeast through more rural areas, passing through Grant and Dents Run.

PA 555 enters Gibson Township in Cameron County and becomes Low Grade Road, passing through the community of Hicks Run before winding southeast through the Elk State Forest. The road turns to the east and leaves the state forest, continuing through more wooded areas. The route turns northeast and passes through Castle Garden before crossing into the borough of Driftwood and becoming Bridge Street. Here, PA 555 runs through woodland with some homes, crossing the Sinnemahoning Creek and turning east-southeast onto Driftwood Avenue. The route curves north-northeast past a few residences and crosses Norfolk Southern's Buffalo Line. PA 555 turns west onto 2nd Street and north onto Chestnut Street, ending at PA 120.

== Major intersections ==
County	Location	mi	km	Destinations	Notes
Elk	Jay Township	0.000	0.000	PA 255 (Bennetts Valley Highway) – St. Marys, DuBois	Western terminus
Cameron	Driftwood	26.332	42.377	PA 120 (3rd Street) – Emporium, Renovo	Eastern terminus
1.000 mi = 1.609 km; 1.000 km = 0.621 mi
