= Weedville, Pennsylvania =

Unincorporated community in Pennsylvania, US

- Census-designated place
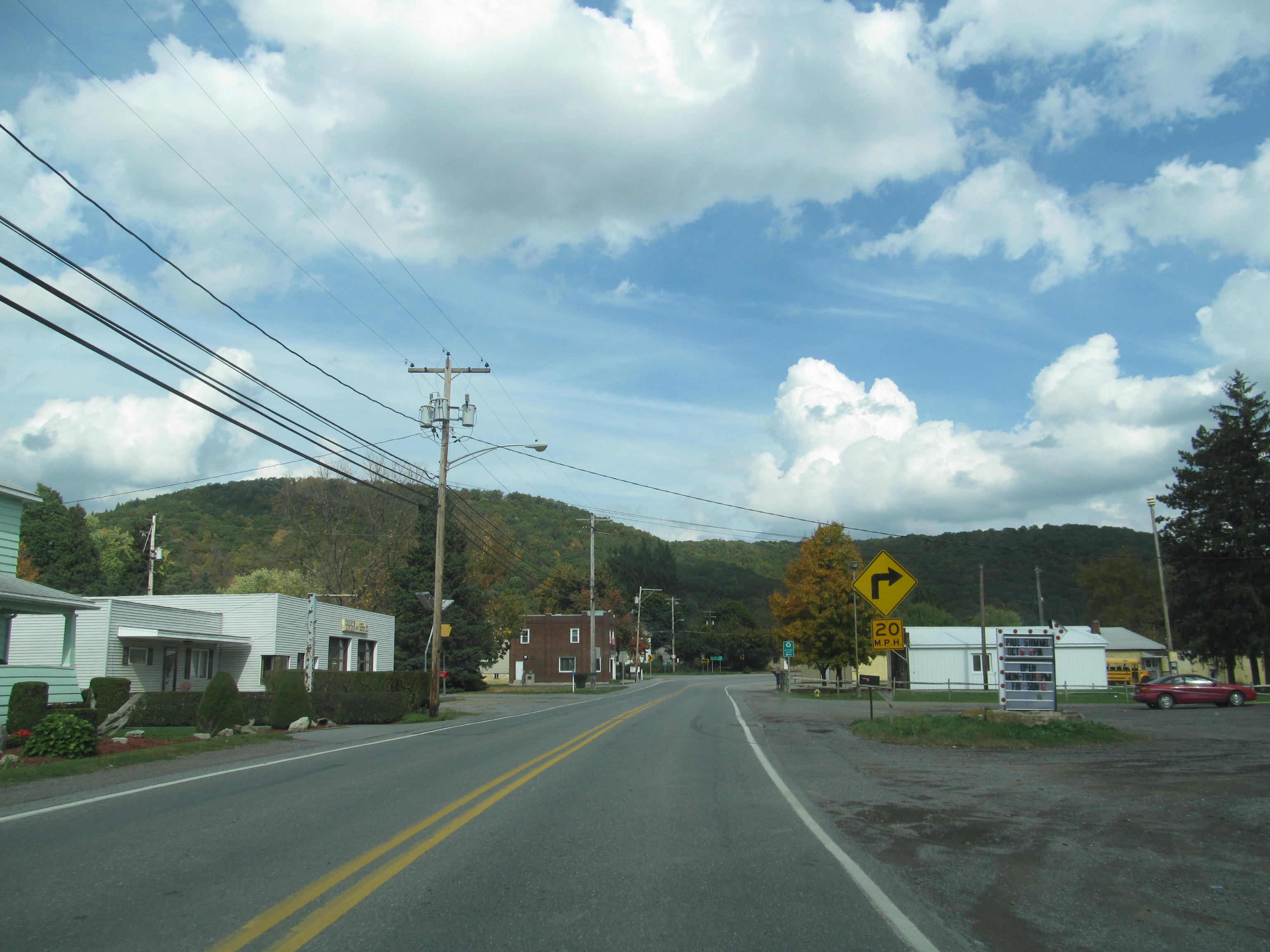
- Eastbound PA 555 in Weedville

- Location within Pennsylvania
- Coordinates: 41°16′35″N 78°29′30″W
- Country: United States
- State: Pennsylvania
- County: Elk
- Township: Jay

Area
  - Total: 2.00 sq mi (5.18 km^{2})
  - Land: 1.95 sq mi (5.06 km^{2})
  - Water: 0.050 sq mi (0.13 km^{2})
- Elevation: 1,170 ft (360 m)

Population (2020)
  - Total: 565
  - Density: 278/sq mi (107.2/km^{2})
- Time zone: UTC-5 (Eastern (EST))
  - Summer (DST): UTC-4 (EDT)
- ZIP code: 15868
- FIPS code: 42-81960
- GNIS feature ID: 1190770

Weedville is an unincorporated community and census-designated place in Jay Township, Elk County, Pennsylvania, United States. As of the 2020 census, the population was 565.

Weedville is located in the southern part of Jay Township, in southeastern Elk County, in the valley of the Bennett Branch Sinnemahoning Creek, a tributary of the West Branch Susquehanna River. It is bordered to the northwest by Byrnedale and to the southwest by Force. Pennsylvania Route 255 passes through the community, leading north 12 miles (19 km) to St. Marys and southwest 19 miles (31 km) to DuBois. Pennsylvania Route 555 branches off PA 255 in the center of Weedville, leading northeast, then east, down the Bennett Branch valley 26 miles (42 km) to Driftwood. The village was founded in 1816 and named after Abizh B. Weed, a wealthy land owner.
