= Benezette, Pennsylvania =

Unincorporated community in Pennsylvania, US

- Unincorporated community
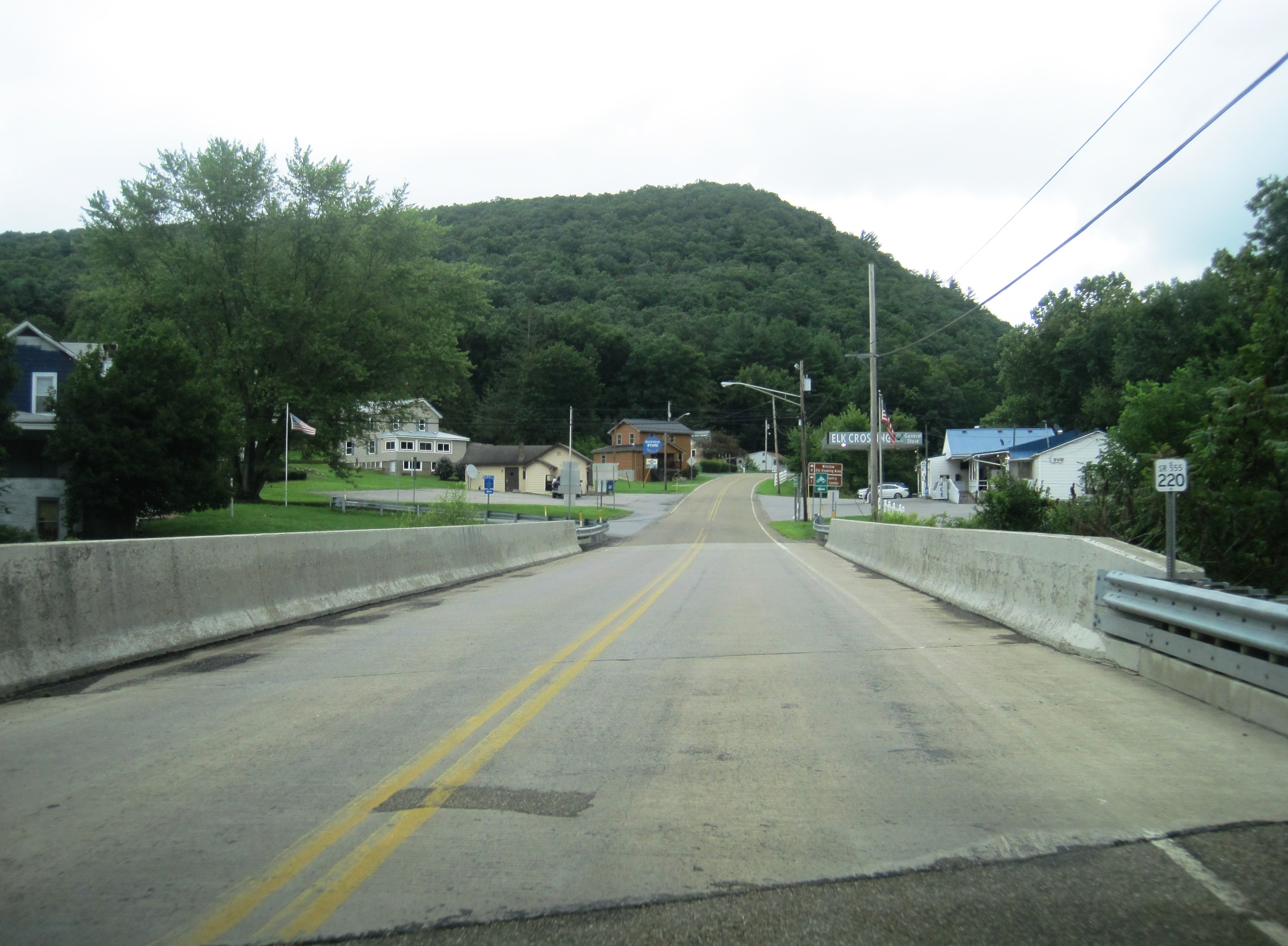
- Eastbound PA 555 in Benezette

- Location within Pennsylvania
- Coordinates: 41°19′00″N 78°23′11″W
- Country: United States
- State: Pennsylvania
- County: Elk
- Township: Benezette
- Elevation: 991 ft (302 m)
- Time zone: UTC-5 (Eastern (EST))
  - Summer (DST): UTC-4 (EDT)
- ZIP code: 15821
- Area code: 814
- GNIS feature ID: 1183465

Benezette, also known as Benezett, is an unincorporated community in Elk County, Pennsylvania, United States. The community is located on the Bennett Branch and Pennsylvania Route 555, 11.9 miles (19.2 km) southeast of St. Mary's. Benezette has a post office with ZIP code 15821.
