= Saint Marys Area School District =

School district in Pennsylvania

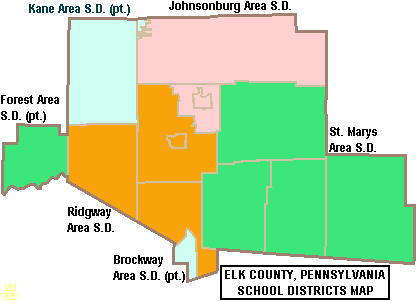

Address
- 977 S Saint Marys Rd Saint Marys, Pennsylvania, 15857-2832; United States

District information
- Type: Public

Students and staff
- Colors: Red and Blue

Other information
- Website: http://www.smasd.org/

The Saint Marys Area School District is a midsized rural/suburban public school district serving parts of Elk County, Pennsylvania. It encompasses the city of St. Marys and the townships of Fox Township, Jay Township, and Benezette Township. Saint Marys Area School District encompasses approximately 341 square miles (880 km^{2}). According to 2000 federal census data, the district serves a resident population of 20,557. In 2009, the district residents’ per capita income was $18,669, while the median family income was $48,121. In the Commonwealth, the median family income was $49,501 and the United States median family income was $49,445, in 2010.

The district contains four schools: Fox Elementary, South Elementary, Saint Marys Area Middle School, and Saint Marys Area High School.
