= Loleta =

Loleta may refer to:

- Loleta, California
- Loleta, Pennsylvania
