= Driftwood, Pennsylvania =

Borough in Pennsylvania, US

- Borough
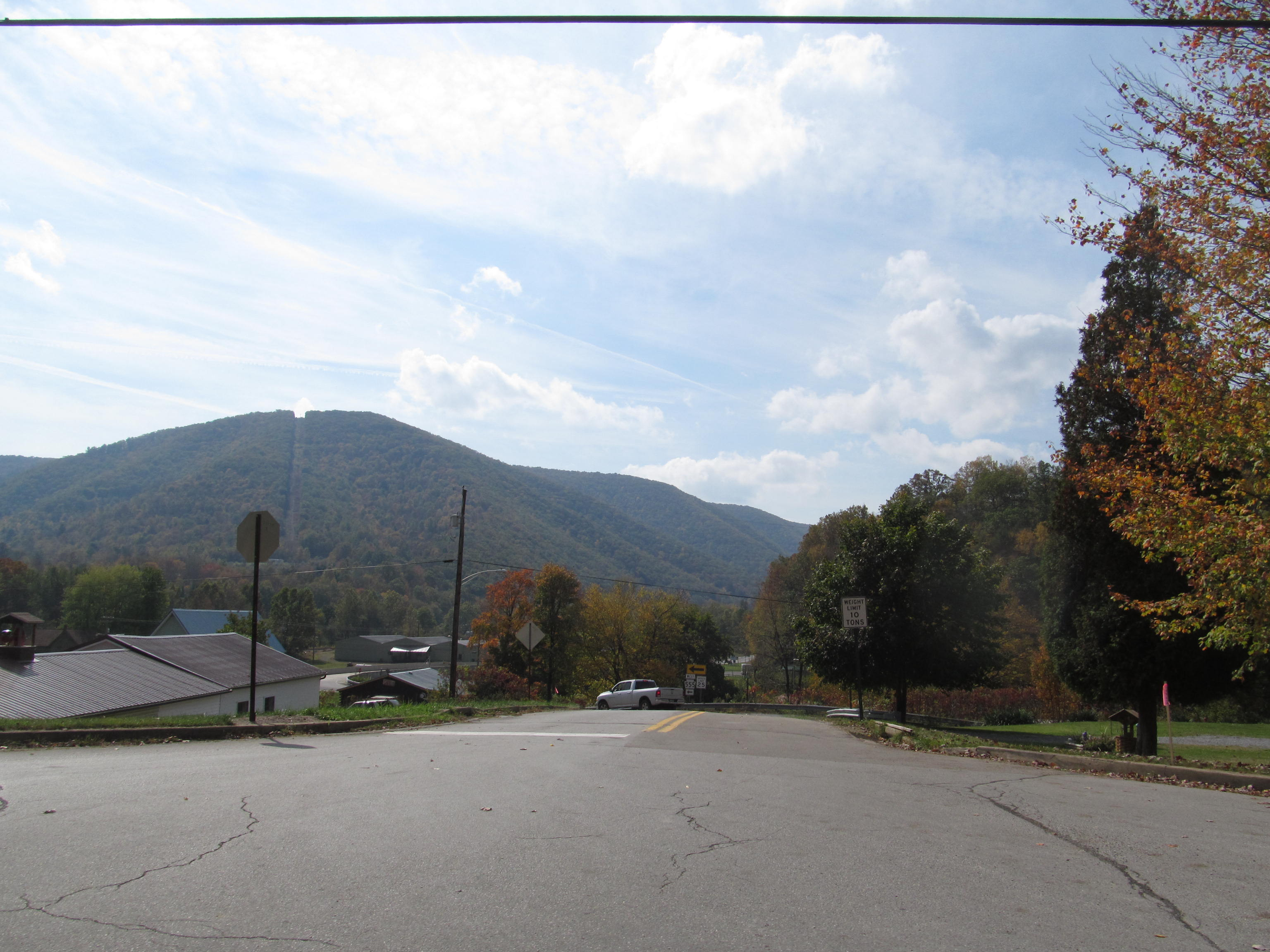
- View of westbound PA 555 from PA 120 in Driftwood

- Location of Driftwood in Cameron County, Pennsylvania.

- Location within Pennsylvania Location within the United States
- Coordinates: 41°20′20″N 78°08′08″W
- Country: United States
- State: Pennsylvania
- County: Cameron
- Settled: 1804
- Incorporated (borough): 1872

Area
  - Total: 2.56 sq mi (6.62 km^{2})
  - Land: 2.49 sq mi (6.45 km^{2})
  - Water: 0.069 sq mi (0.18 km^{2})
- Elevation: 850 ft (260 m)

Population (2020)
  - Total: 38
  - Density: 15.3/sq mi (5.89/km^{2})
- Time zone: Eastern (EST)
  - Summer (DST): EDT
- ZIP code: 15832
- Area code: 814
- FIPS code: 42-19976
- Website: https://driftwoodboro.com/

Driftwood is a borough in Cameron County, Pennsylvania, United States. The population was 36 at the 2020 census.

== History ==
The community takes its name from Driftwood Branch Sinnemahoning Creek (in older sources called "Driftwood Creek").

== Geography ==
Driftwood is located in southern Cameron County at 41°20′20″N 78°8′8″W (41.338836, -78.135535), at the confluence of the Bennett Branch and the Driftwood Branch of Sinnemahoning Creek, an east-flowing tributary of the West Branch Susquehanna River. The community is at the bottom of a gorge carved 1,200 feet (370 m) deep or more into the Allegheny Plateau by the creek and its branches.

Pennsylvania Route 120 passes through Driftwood, following the Driftwood Branch north (upstream) 18 miles (29 km) to Emporium, the Cameron County seat, and following Sinnemahoning Creek and the West Branch of the Susquehanna east (downstream) 27 miles (43 km) to Renovo. Pennsylvania Route 555 leads west from Driftwood up the Bennett Branch 25 miles (40 km) to Weedville.

According to the United States Census Bureau, the borough of Driftwood has a total area of 2.5 square miles (6.6 km^{2}), of which 2.5 square miles (6.4 km^{2}) is land and 0.08 square miles (0.2 km^{2}), or 2.66%, is water.

== Demographics ==
Historical population
Census	Pop.	Note	%±
1880	504		—
1890	628		24.6%
1900	509		−18.9%
1910	517		1.6%
1920	478		−7.5%
1930	282		−41.0%
1940	293		3.9%
1950	289		−1.4%
1960	203		−29.8%
1970	184		−9.4%
1980	163		−11.4%
1990	116		−28.8%
2000	103		−11.2%
2010	67		−35.0%
2020	38		−43.3%
2021 (est.)	36	▼	−5.3%

=== 2000 census ===
As of the census of 2000, there were 103 people, 49 households, and 27 families residing in the borough. The population density was 57.5 inhabitants per square mile (22.2/km^{2}). There were 88 housing units at an average density of 49.1 per square mile (19.0/km^{2}). The racial makeup of the borough was 100.00% White.

There were 49 households, out of which 18.4% had children under the age of 18 living with them, 49.0% were married couples living together, 6.1% had a female householder with no husband present, and 42.9% were non-families. 36.7% of all households were made up of individuals, and 16.3% had someone living alone who was 65 years of age or older. The average household size was 2.10 and the average family size was 2.82.

In the borough the population was spread out, with 19.4% under the age of 18, 5.8% from 18 to 24, 26.2% from 25 to 44, 29.1% from 45 to 64, and 19.4% who were 65 years of age or older. The median age was 44 years. For every 100 females there were 102.0 males. For every 100 females age 18 and over, there were 88.6 males.

The median income for a household in the borough was $21,458, and the median income for a family was $44,167. Males had a median income of $32,250 versus $28,333 for females. The per capita income for the borough was $16,708. There were no families and 8.9% of the population living below the poverty line, including no under eighteens and 33.3% of those over 64.

=== 2010 census ===
As of the census of 2010, there were 67 people, 35 households, and 19 families residing in the borough. The population density was 26.8 inhabitants per square mile (10.3/km^{2}). There were 93 housing units at an average density of 37.2 per square mile (14.4/km^{2}). The racial makeup of the borough was 94% White, 1.5% Black, and 4.5% two or more races.

There were 35 households, out of which 17.1% had children under the age of 18 living with them, 42.9% were married couples living together, 5.7% had a female householder with no husband present, and 45.7% were non-families. 40% of all households were made up of individuals, and 11.5% had someone living alone who was 65 years of age or older. The average household size was 1.91 and the average family size was 2.58.

In the borough the population was spread out, with 10.4% under the age of 18, 65.7% from 18 to 64, and 23.9% who were 65 years of age or older. The median age was 51.3 years.

The median income for a household in the borough was $45,417, and the median income for a family was $50,536. The per capita income for the borough was $22,060. There were 9.5% families and 9.8% of the population living below the poverty line, including none under eighteens and 10% of those over 64.

== Notable people ==
- Garrett Cochran's birthplace
- Tom Mix's birthplace, though miles away, had an address of Driftwood
