= Fox Township, Elk County, Pennsylvania =

Township in Pennsylvania, United States

Coordinates: 41°18′N 78°36′W

- Township
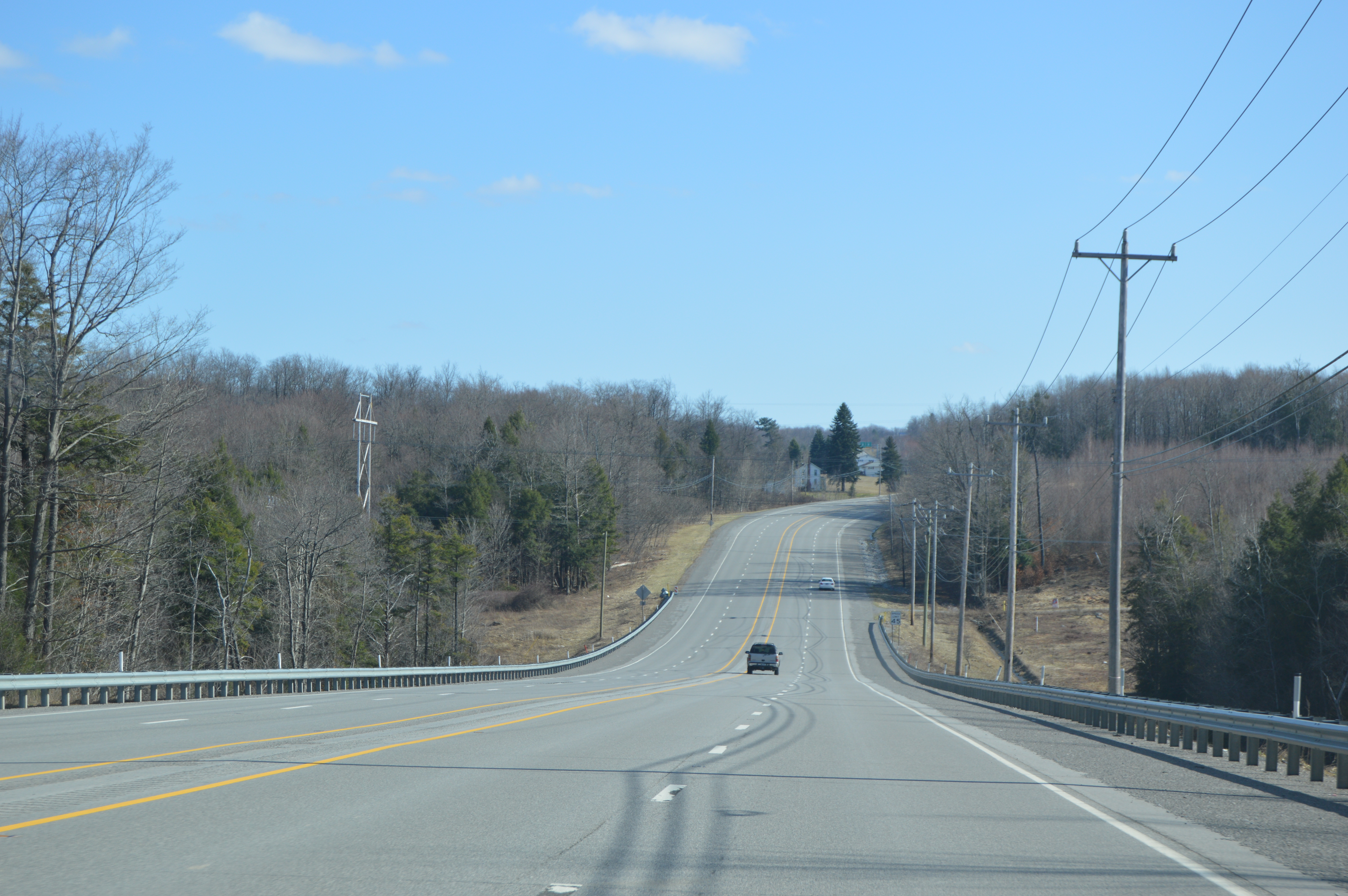
- Along Pennsylvania Route 255 south of St. Marys

- Logo

- Location in Elk County and the state of Pennsylvania.
- Country: United States
- State: Pennsylvania
- County: Elk
- Settled: 1811
- Incorporated: 1814

Government
  - Type: Board of Supervisors
  - Supervisor: Michael Keller
  - Supervisor: Dave Mattiuz
  - Supervisor: Randy Gradizzi

Area
  - Total: 67.23 sq mi (174.12 km^{2})
  - Land: 67.17 sq mi (173.96 km^{2})
  - Water: 0.058 sq mi (0.15 km^{2})

Population (2020)
  - Total: 3,577
  - Estimate (2022): 3,543
  - Density: 53.26/sq mi (20.56/km^{2})
- ZIP code: 15846
- Area code: 814
- FIPS code: 42-047-27088
- Website: foxtownship.com

Fox Township is a township in Elk County, Pennsylvania, United States. The population was 3,577 at the 2020 census, down from 3,630 in 2010.

The township includes the unincorporated communities of Gardner Hill, Kylers Corners, Toby, Coal Hollow, Fairview, Paine, Kersey, Dagus, Dagus Mines, Earlyville, and Shelvey.

== Geography ==
Fox Township is located in south-central Elk County, and is bordered by Horton Township to the west, Ridgway Township to the northwest, the city of St. Marys to the north, Jay Township to the east, and Huston Township in Clearfield County to the south.

According to the U.S. Census Bureau, Fox Township has a total area of 67.2 square miles (174.1 km^{2}), of which 67.2 square miles (174.0 km^{2}) is land and 0.1 square miles (0.2 km^{2}), or 0.09%, is water.

== History ==
The first settlers arrived in the area around 1810. Coal mining took place as early as 1848. Kersey Coal Company and Northwestern Mining & Exchange Company had mines in place by the 1880s.

== Demographics ==
Historical population
| Census | Pop. | Note | %± |
|---|---|---|---|
| 2000 | 3,734 | | — |
| 2010 | 3,630 | | −2.8% |
| 2020 | 3,577 | | −1.5% |
| 2022 (est.) | 3,543 | | −1.0% |
U.S. Decennial Census

=== 2010 ===
At the 2010 census there were 3,630 people, 1,497 households, and 1,060 families in the township. The population density was 54 people per square mile (21.1/km^{2}). There were 1,694 housing units at an average density of 25.2/sq mi (9.8/km^{2}). The racial makeup of the township was 99.2% White, 0.1% African American, 0.1% Native American, 0.1% Asian, 0.1% from other races, and 0.4% from two or more races. Hispanic or Latino of any race were 0.3%.

There were 1,497 households, 29.5% had children under the age of 18 living with them, 57.1% were married couples living together, 8.5% had a female householder with no husband present, and 29.2% were non-families. 24.8% of households were made up of individuals, and 11% were one person aged 65 or older. The average household size was 2.42 and the average family size was 2.85.

The age distribution was 22.1% under the age of 18, 61.3% from 18 to 64, and 16.6% 65 or older. The median age was 43 years.

The median household income was $47,000 and the median family income was $49,923. Males had a median income of $36,886 versus $31,729 for females. The per capita income for the township was $22,235. About 2.4% of families and 6.1% of the population were below the poverty line, including 5.6% of those under age 18 and 2.4% of those age 65 or over.

=== 2000 ===
At the 2000 census there were 3,734 people, 1,421 households, and 1,055 families in the township. The population density was 55.5 inhabitants per square mile (21.4/km^{2}). There were 1,569 housing units at an average density of 23.3/sq mi (9.0/km^{2}). The racial makeup of the township was 99.54% White, 0.05% African American, 0.08% Native American, 0.08% Asian, 0.05% from other races, and 0.19% from two or more races. Hispanic or Latino of any race were 0.11%.

There were 1,421 households, 35.1% had children under the age of 18 living with them, 61.7% were married couples living together, 7.4% had a female householder with no husband present, and 25.7% were non-families. 21.1% of households were made up of individuals, and 9.6% were one person aged 65 or older. The average household size was 2.63 and the average family size was 3.05.

The age distribution was 26.4% under the age of 18, 6.5% from 18 to 24, 31.1% from 25 to 44, 23.5% from 45 to 64, and 12.4% 65 or older. The median age was 36 years. For every 100 females there were 103.2 males. For every 100 females age 18 and over, there were 101.5 males.

The median household income was $40,703 and the median family income was $44,412. Males had a median income of $30,625 versus $24,107 for females. The per capita income for the township was $15,529. About 4.4% of families and 7.5% of the population were below the poverty line, including 5.8% of those under age 18 and 10.9% of those age 65 or over.

== Education ==
Children residing in the township may choose to attend Saint Marys Area School District, a local public school district. The elementary school in the township is called Fox Township Elementary School.
