= Villa Maria Academy (Erie, Pennsylvania) =

Private school in Erie, Pennsylvania, United States

Location
- 2403 West 8th Street; Erie, (Erie County), Pennsylvania 16505; United States; 42°6′26.5″N 80°8′12″W

Information
- Type: Private
- Motto: Faith, Family, Excellence, and Tradition
- Religious affiliations: Roman Catholic (Sisters of St. Joseph)
- Established: 1892
- Closed: 2022
- President: Fr. Scott W. Jabo
- Principal: Sr. Mary Drexler SSJ
- Grades: 9-12
- Gender: Girls
- Campus size: 30 acres (120,000 m^{2})
- Colors: Blue and White
- Team name: Victors
- Accreditation: Middle States Association of Colleges and Schools
- Newspaper: Villa Voice; Essence
- Tuition: appx $10,000 per year
- Website: www.prep-villa.com

Villa Maria Academy was a private, Roman Catholic high school in Erie, Pennsylvania. It was in the Roman Catholic Diocese of Erie. In 2019, 83 students graduated from Villa Maria Academy and 100% of the graduating class was accepted into a four-year college. The school also has 12:1 student to teacher ratio.

== Notable alumnae ==
- Elizabeth Hayes (1941), physician who led the coal mine strike for public health
- Linda Bebko-Jones (1964), former member of the Pennsylvania House of Representatives
- Rebecca Hart (2003), equestrian and Paralympic Games Gold Medalist
- Kayla McBride (2010), WNBA All-Star guard
