= Force, Pennsylvania =

Unincorporated community in Pennsylvania, US

- Census-designated place
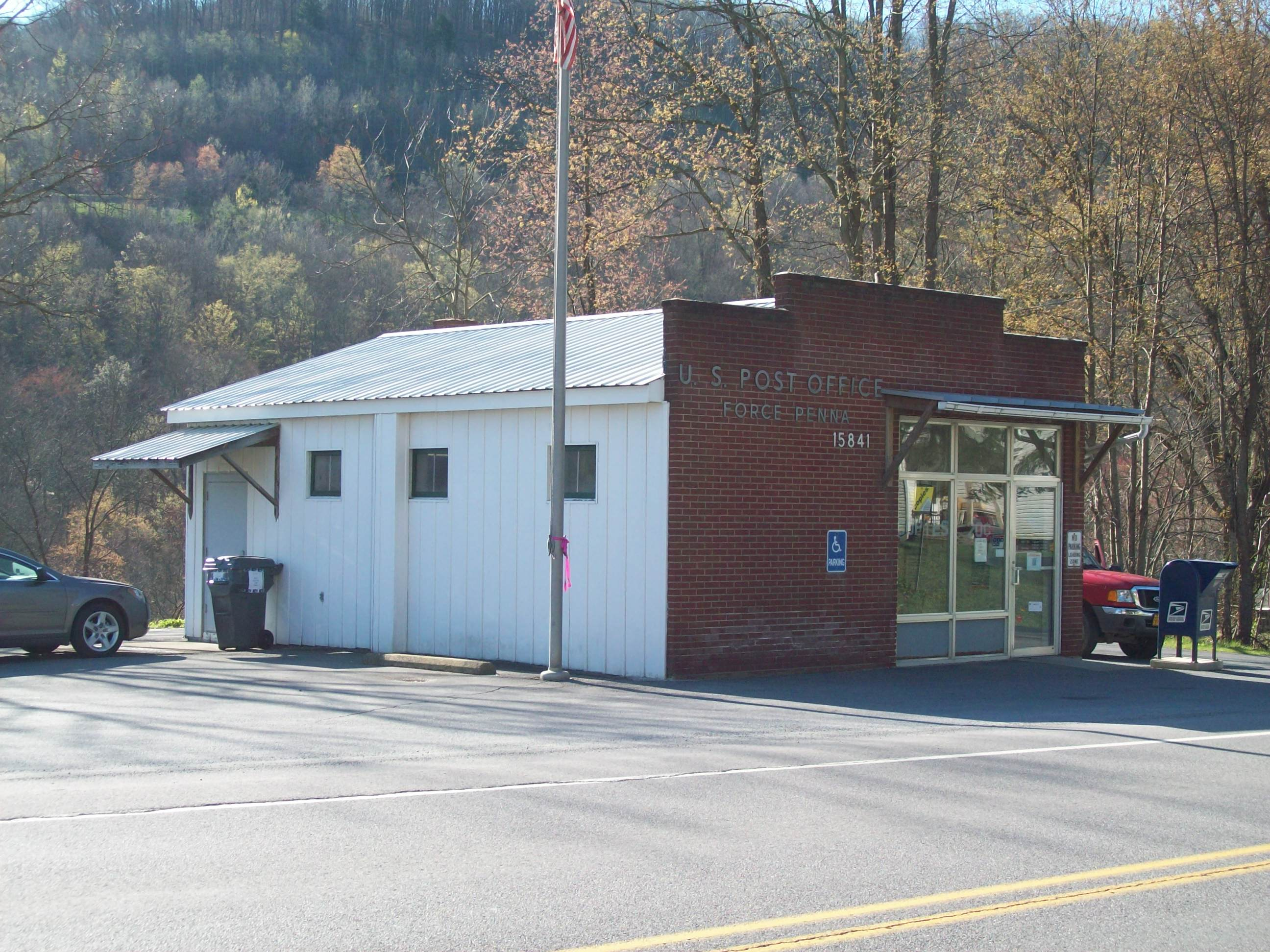
- U.S. Post Office, Force, PA, April 2012

- Location within the state of Pennsylvania Force (the United States)
- Coordinates: 41°15′28″N 78°30′04″W
- Country: United States
- State: Pennsylvania
- County: Elk
- Township: Jay

Area
  - Total: 0.22 sq mi (0.56 km^{2})
  - Land: 0.21 sq mi (0.55 km^{2})
  - Water: 0.0039 sq mi (0.01 km^{2})
- Elevation: 1,240 ft (380 m)

Population (2020)
  - Total: 213
  - Density: 1,001.0/sq mi (386.48/km^{2})
- Time zone: UTC-5 (Eastern (EST))
  - Summer (DST): UTC-4 (EDT)
- ZIP code: 15841
- Area code: 814
- FIPS code: 42-26504

Force is an unincorporated community and census-designated place in Jay Township, Elk County, Pennsylvania, United States. As of the 2020 census it had a population of 213. It is located on Pennsylvania Route 255 between St. Marys and Penfield.

The community has the name of Jack Force, a frontiersman.

== Demographics ==
Historical population
Census	Pop.	Note	%±
2010	253		—
2020	213		−15.8%
U.S. Decennial Census
