= Loleta, Pennsylvania =

Ghost town in Pennsylvania, US

Coordinates: 41°24′22″N 79°04′36″W

Loleta is a ghost town in Elk County, Pennsylvania, United States. The town was founded in 1889, and at its peak contained 600 inhabitants, a saw mill, a shingle mill, and a broom factory. A railway connected the town with Sheffield, where the products of the factories were sold. After the timber supply was exhausted in 1913, the mills shut down and the town was deserted. The site is now a recreational area within Allegheny National Forest. Its altitude is 1,348 feet (411 m).
