= USCGC Conifer =

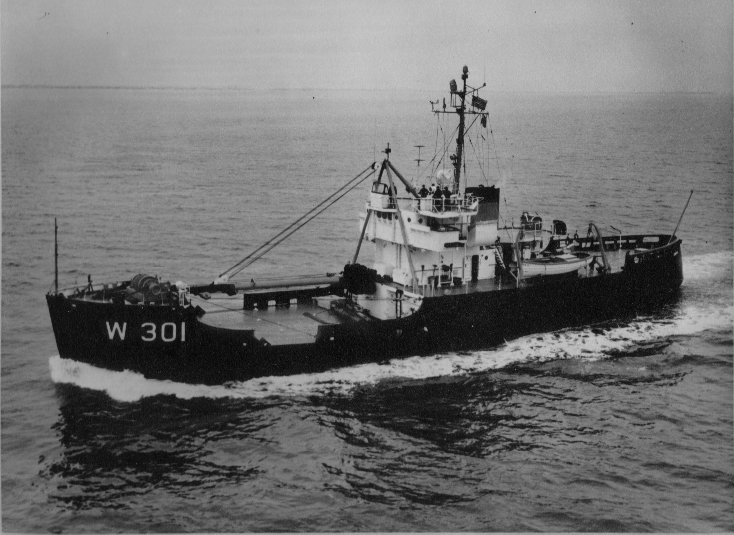
- USCGC Conifer

History

United States
- Name: Conifer
- Ordered: 23 February 1942
- Builder: Zenith Dredge
- Laid down: 6 July 1942
- Launched: 3 November 1942
- Commissioned: 5 May 1943
- Decommissioned: 23 June 2000
- Identification: IMO number: 8991334
- Status: Friendships Cargo MV Hope

General characteristics
- Displacement: 935 long tons (950 t)
- Length: 180 ft (55 m)
- Beam: 37 ft (11 m)
- Draft: 12 ft (3.7 m)
- Propulsion: 2 × Westinghouse generators driven by 2 Cooper-Bessemer EMD-8 8-cylinder 4-cycle 6352 cubic inch diesel engines (originally)
- Speed: 13 kn (24 km/h; 15 mph) maximum
- Range: Approx. 7,500 nmi (13,900 km; 8,600 mi)
- Complement: 6 officers, 74 enlisted
- Armament: 1 × 3 in (76 mm) 50-caliber single mount; 4 × 20 mm 80 caliber; 2 × depth charge tracks.

The USCGC Conifer (WLB 301) was a 180 foot (55 m) seagoing buoy tender. Conifer and her sister ships, commonly referred to as "one-eighties", served as the backbone of the Coast Guard's Aids to Navigation fleet for over 50 years before their replacement by the newer Juniper-class cutters.

== Background and ship development ==
Conifer's heritage can be traced back to the late 1930s, when the United States Lighthouse Service initiated a series of preliminary designs for a ship to replace their aging fleet of lighthouse tenders. The tenders were designed to provide logistics support (fuel, fresh water, and food) to staffed off-shore lighthouses. They were also equipped to service the relatively few buoys in operation at that time.

In 1940 the Lighthouse Service merged into the Coast Guard (The Coast Guard was formed in 1913 when the U.S. Revenue Service was combined with the U.S. Life Saving Service). The Coast Guard amended the tender designs to include Search and Rescue (SAR) features and an icebreaking capability, making them the first true "multi-mission" capable cutters. The SAR requirements provided finer design lines at the bow and stern, and a reduced beam to length ratio. A larger deckhouse was incorporated to increase the available interior space. Single screw propulsion, a cutaway forefoot under the bow, and rounded bilges facilitated ice-breaking. The hull displacement was 960 long tons (980 t). To reduce costs, on available off-the-shelf technology was utilized. The contract for the lead ship was awarded to Zenith Dredge Company of Duluth, Minnesota, in January 1941.

The new class of Cutter was originally designated "WAGL" and was later changed to "WLB". The "W" is the navy's abbreviation or "Coast Guard", the "L" designates it as a lighthouse/buoy tender, and the "B" signifies it as a seagoing tender. The Coast Guard also operates three smaller classes of buoy tenders: WLM's (Coastal), WLI's (Inland), and WLR's (River). During the next 3 years the Coast Guard acquired a total of 39 WLB's: 17 built by Zenith, 21 were built by Marine Iron and Shipbuilding, also located in Duluth, and one was built at the Coast Guard Yard in Baltimore, Maryland. Three different classes of WLB's were built: thirteen "A" (or Cactus) class, six "B" (or Mesquite) class, and twenty "C" (or Iris) class. Tenders are assigned botanical names, a tradition that stems back to 1867.

== Construction and specifications ==
Conifer was the fifth "A" class WLB constructed. The procurement contract with Marine Iron and Shipbuilding was signed on 23 February 1942, for a cost of $854,003. The keel was laid on 6 July. Three months later, on 3 November, Conifer was launched at exactly 1200 hours.

Conifer's engineering plant consisted of two Cooper-Bessemer straight-8 cylinder, 4-cycle diesel engines. Because of their distinctive rumble, the Coopers were referred to as the "rock-crushers". Each diesel drove a Westinghouse DC generator. The DC electricity powered a single Westinghouse main-motor, which was coupled directly to the propeller shaft. The 5-bladed prop measured 8 ft 6 in (2.59 m) in diameter. The cargo boom and hoist winches were electric powered. The boat davits were hand-cranked, while the falls were fair-led to the aft towing capstan.

Conifer was armed with a three-inch (76 mm) 50 caliber deck gun, four 20 millimeter 80 caliber anti-aircraft machine guns, and two racks of depth charges. Conifer was placed in Commission, Special Status, on 5 May 1943. Final outfitting and machinery tests were completed on 24 May. Conifer sailed across the Great Lakes and through the St. Lawrence Seaway en route to the Coast Guard Yard in Baltimore, Maryland. The electronics package of HF radios, radar, and sonar was installed at the Yard. She sailed for shakedown training on 24 July 1943, with a full wartime complement of 6 officers and 74 crewmen. On 31 July Conifer arrived in Boston, her first homeport.

== Service history ==
=== 1943–1945 (Wartime Service) ===
On 9 August 1943 Conifer was assigned to Commander, Task Force 24, Atlantic Fleet, U.S. Navy. On 13 August Conifer sailed on anti-submarine and weather station deployments in the North Atlantic. Conifer steamed as far south as Bermuda, east to the Azore Islands off Africa, and north into the icepacks of Greenland.

On 8 August 1943, while underway in the North Atlantic Conifer observed a German U-boat diving. Using sonar she located a possible sub, and attacked with depth charges. The contact was later lost. On 28 September 1944 Conifer was underway at night off the coast of Greenland. When threatened with imminent attack from a Canadian B-24 bomber, Conifer's gun crews were prepared to open fire when the aircraft finally responded to radio communications. On 30 September 1944 Conifer conducted a search with a B-17 and a B-24 for a damaged German submarine. The planes located an oil slick, and Conifer depth-charged the area. Additional oil appeared through the day, and the submarine was presumed sunk.

On 24 January 1945, Conifer was assigned to Commander, Fifth Coast Guard District. On 2 February she was ordered to Chesapeake Bay to support convoy operations. On 1 May 1945, Conifer arrived in her new homeport, Portsmouth, Virginia. Her primary mission was to service aids to navigation along the southern Virginia and northern North Carolina coasts.

=== 1952–1983 ===
In August 1952 Conifer's homeport was changed to Morehead City, North Carolina. In September 1960, Conifer moved back to Portsmouth, VA. On 11 June 1975, Conifer was once again assigned to Morehead City, NC. Conifer's area of operation was modified to include the entire coast of North Carolina, and the re-supply of the Diamond Shoals and Frying Pan Shoals lightships. When required, Conifer broke ice in the Chesapeake Bay.

=== 1983–1986 Overhaul ===
On 16 July 1983, Conifer arrived at the Coast Guard Yard. She was temporarily decommissioned, and commenced a $7.5 million overhaul under the Service Life Extension Program (SLEP). Many noteworthy improvements were accomplished during the SLEP. The deckhouse was removed, and the hull was essentially gutted down to the keel. Conifer received new main engines and ship's service generators, a new electrical system, and a new interior climate control system. The interior spaces were reconfigured. The forward tanks were reduced in size, and the forward cargo hold was eliminated to make a space for additional berthing areas, a crew's lounge, and boatswain, electrical, damage control, and electronics shops. A bow thruster was installed. The electrical weight-handling gear was replaced with a hydraulic system. Hydraulic boat davits were installed, and the motor surf boat was replaced by a rigid hull inflatable (RHI). A new deckhouse was constructed with a larger pilothouse and a radio room. Six pieces of original equipment were re-installed: the anchor windlass; the mast; the ship's bell; the helm wheel; the main motor; and the steering gear.

Conifer' two new main engines were General Motors Electromotive Division V-8 two cycle diesel engines. They are the same engines employed in diesel freight trains. Each cylinder displaces 645 in^{3} (10.6 L). Each engine is conservatively rated at 1050 hp (783 kW), and produces an impressive 12,850 ft⋅lbf (17,420 N⋅m) of torque. The diesels rotate Westinghouse DC generators, which produce 275 volts 1650 amperes. A propulsion control computer regulates the ratio of volts to current delivered to the electric main propulsion motor. The main motor is rated at 1200 hp (890 kW). With the exception of minor preventive maintenance and scheduled cleanings, the main motor has worked continuously for 50 years. Conifer had other diesel engines: two turbo-charged Detroit Diesel/Johnson & Towers 6-71s powering the 200 kW ship's service generators; one Detroit turbo-charged 8V-71 powering four hydraulic pumps for the cargo boom; and a Detroit 6-71 powering the bow thruster. The Motor Cargo Boat was powered by a Detroit 3-53, and the rigid hull inflatable features a turbo-charged Volvo Penta engine and out drive.

=== 1986–2000 (Final service with the Coast Guard) ===
On 11 August 1986, Conifer was re-commissioned as a United States Coast Guard cutter. On 4 October 1986, Conifer was assigned to Commander, Eleventh Coast Guard District, and arrived in San Pedro, California. Here she carried out her traditional duties until her decommissioning on 23 June 2000.

=== 2000–present (F/V Hope) ===
Conifer is now the F/V Hope, part of the disaster relief fleet of Friend Ships.
