= Byrnedale, Pennsylvania =

Unincorporated community in Pennsylvania, US

- Census-designated place
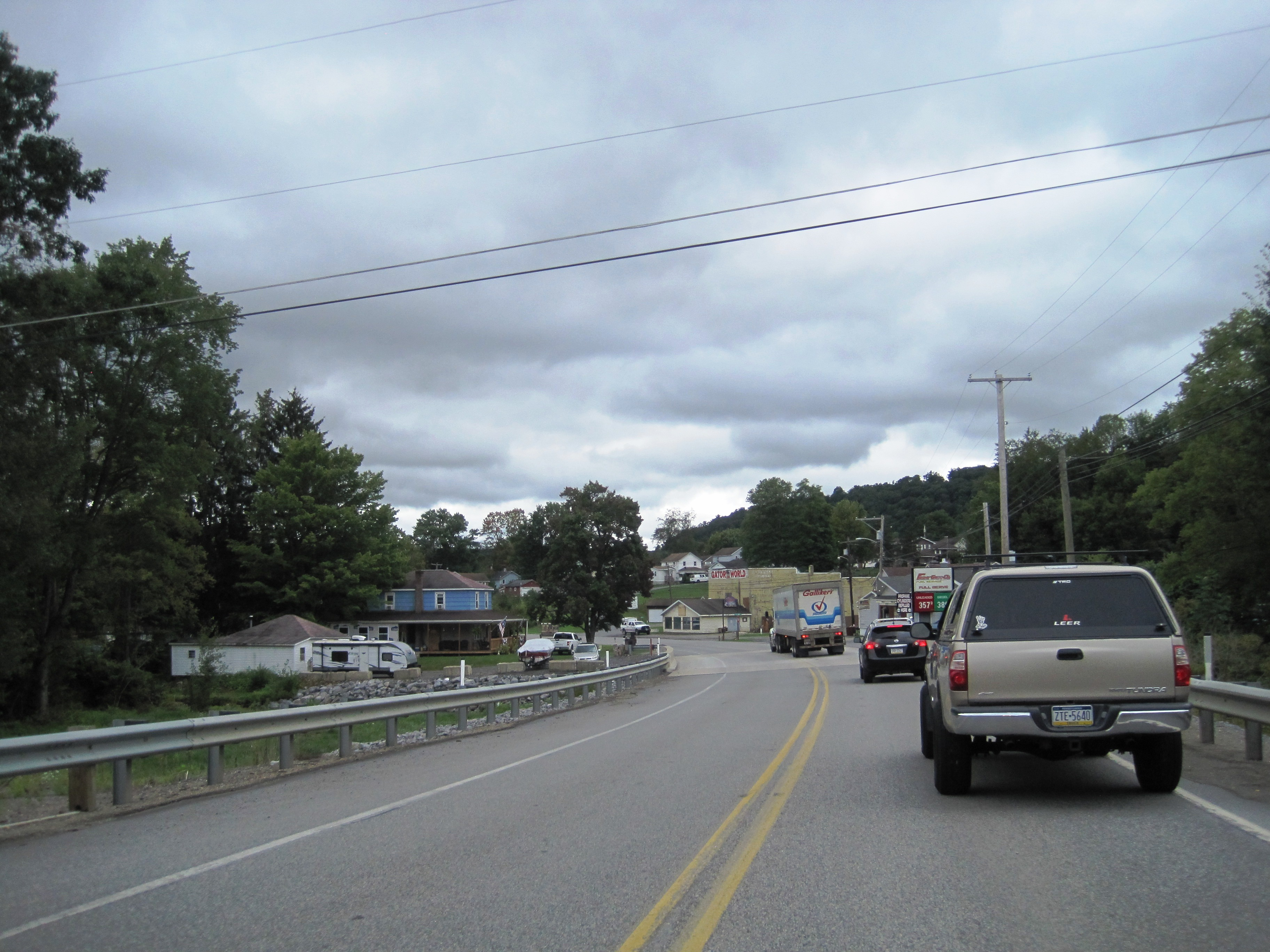
- PA 255 southbound in Byrnedale

- Location within Pennsylvania Location within the United States
- Coordinates: 41°17′32″N 78°30′16″W
- Country: United States
- State: Pennsylvania
- County: Elk
- Township: Jay

Area
  - Total: 1.25 sq mi (3.24 km^{2})
  - Land: 1.25 sq mi (3.24 km^{2})
  - Water: 0 sq mi (0.00 km^{2})
- Elevation: 1,225 ft (373 m)

Population (2020)
  - Total: 382
  - Density: 305.5/sq mi (117.96/km^{2})
- Time zone: UTC-5 (Eastern (EST))
  - Summer (DST): UTC-4 (EDT)
- ZIP code: 15827
- FIPS code: 42-10600
- GNIS feature ID: 1170843

Byrnedale is an unincorporated community and census-designated place in Elk County, Pennsylvania. As of the 2020 census, the population was 382.

It is located in Jay Township, in the valley of Kersey Run, and is bordered to the south by Weedville. Pennsylvania Route 255 passes through Byrnedale, leading north 11 miles (18 km) to St. Marys and southwest 20 miles (32 km) to DuBois.

== Demographics ==
Historical population
Census	Pop.	Note	%±
2010	427		—
2020	382		−10.5%
U.S. Decennial Census
