= Kersey, Pennsylvania =

Unincorporated community in Pennsylvania, US

- Census-designated place
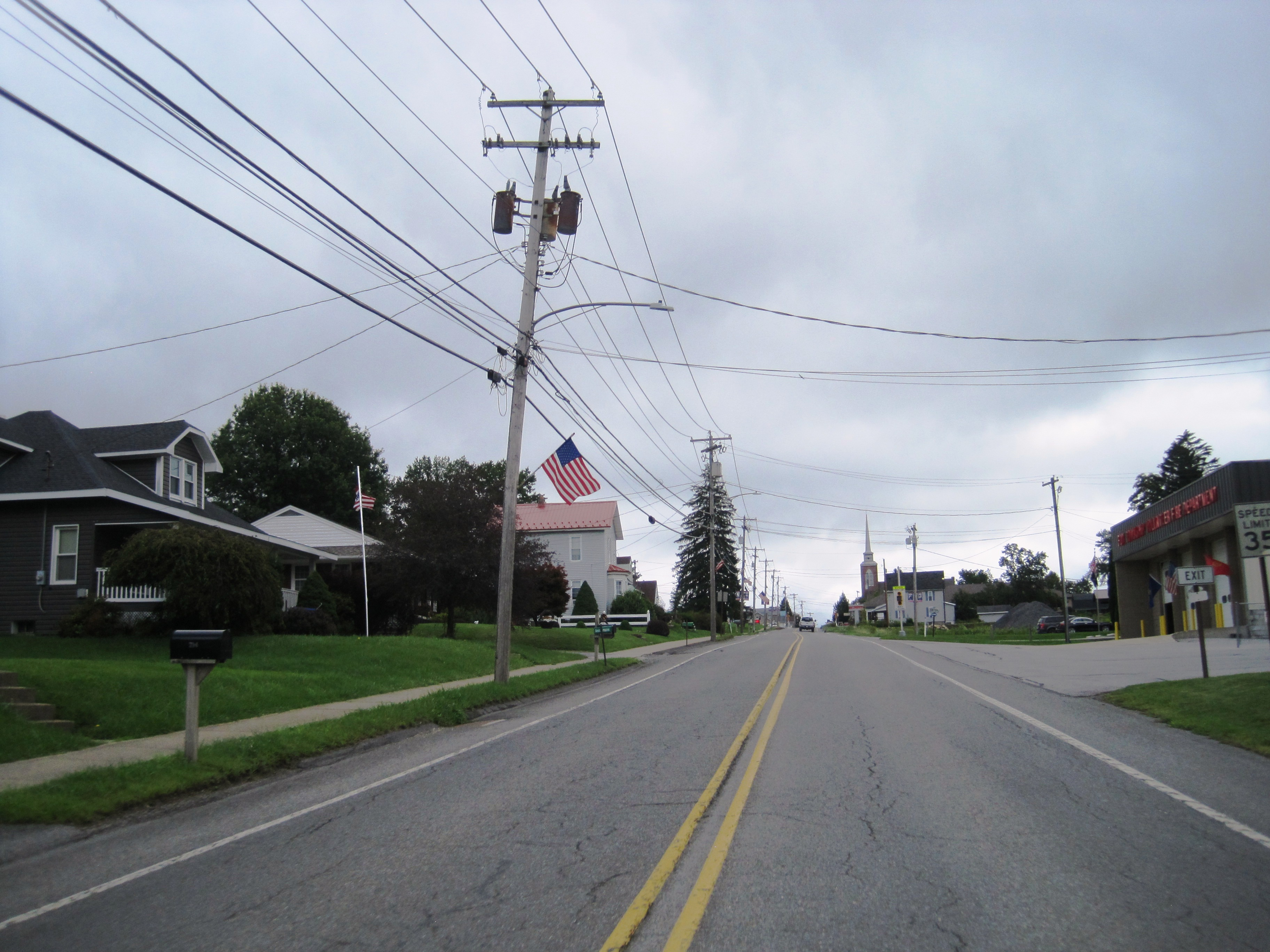
- PA 948 southbound (Main Street eastbound) in Kersey

- Location within Pennsylvania Location within the United States
- Coordinates: 41°21′44″N 78°35′46″W
- Country: United States
- State: Pennsylvania
- County: Elk
- Township: Fox

Area
  - Total: 1.56 sq mi (4.03 km^{2})
  - Land: 1.55 sq mi (4.02 km^{2})
  - Water: 0.0039 sq mi (0.01 km^{2})
- Elevation: 1,980 ft (600 m)

Population (2020)
  - Total: 797
  - Density: 513.1/sq mi (198.12/km^{2})
- Time zone: UTC-5 (Eastern (EST))
  - Summer (DST): UTC-4 (EDT)
- ZIP code: 15846
- Area code: 814
- FIPS code: 42-39512
- GNIS feature ID: 1178412

Kersey is an unincorporated community and census-designated place in Fox Township, Elk County, Pennsylvania, United States. As of the 2020 census the population was 797.

== History ==
The first permanent settlers of the county arrived in 1810 and founded Centreville at the headwaters of Little Toby Creek. Later that year, William Kersey built a gristmill and/or sawmill there, and the settlement was renamed "Kersey", though early sources sometimes refer to it as "Kersey's". At the time, the area was part of Clearfield County, as Elk County had not yet been formed. Early industries in the community were lumber and coal.

== Geography ==
Kersey is located in northern Fox Township, in south-central Elk County. Pennsylvania Route 948 passes through the community, leading east 2 miles (3 km) to PA 255 and west 5 miles (8 km) to U.S. Route 219, which leads 4 miles (6 km) north to Ridgway, the county seat.

According to the U.S. Census Bureau, the Kersey CDP has a total area of 1.56 square miles (4.04 km^{2}), of which 1.49 acres (6,015 m^{2}), or 0.15%, is water. The CDP includes the community of Dagus, to the west of Kersey proper. The community of Dagus Mines borders the CDP to the south. Kersey sits at an elevation of 1,980 feet (600 m) above sea level, 1 mile (1.6 km) northwest of the Eastern Continental Divide.

== Demographics ==
Historical population
Census	Pop.	Note	%±
2020	797		—
U.S. Decennial Census
