= Penfield, Pennsylvania =

Unincorporated community in Pennsylvania, US

- Unincorporated community
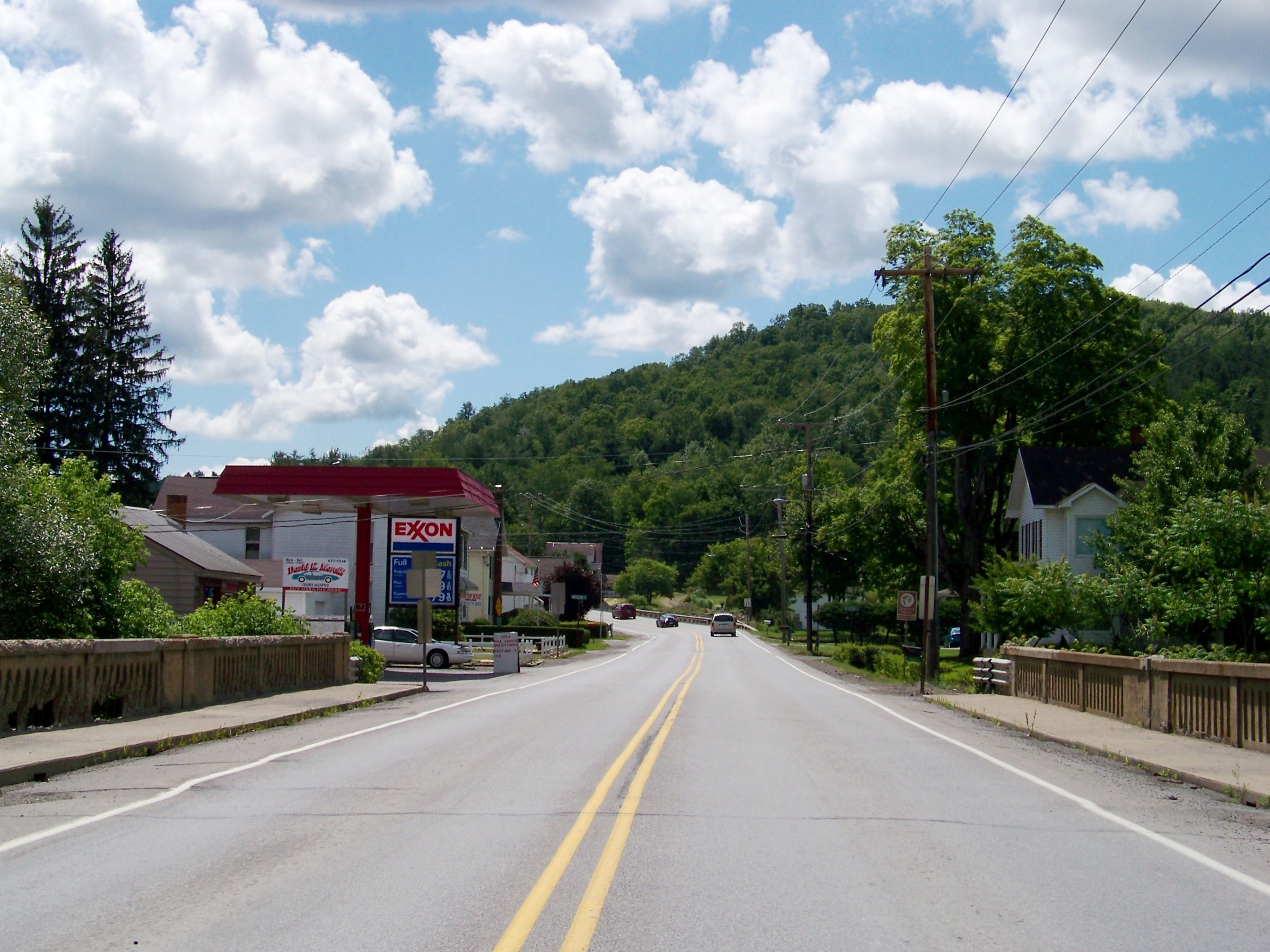

- Location within Pennsylvania
- Coordinates: 41°12′30″N 78°34′32″W
- Country: United States
- State: Pennsylvania
- County: Clearfield
- Elevation: 1,237 ft (377 m)
- Time zone: UTC-5 (Eastern (EST))
  - Summer (DST): UTC-4 (EDT)
- ZIP code: 15849
- Area code: 814
- GNIS feature ID: 1183465

Penfield is an unincorporated community that is located in Clearfield County, Pennsylvania, United States.

== Geography and notable features ==
The community is situated at the intersection of Pennsylvania Route 153 and Pennsylvania Route 255, 11.3 miles (18.2 km) east-northeast of DuBois.

Penfield has a post office with ZIP code 15849.

== Demographics ==
Historical population
Census	Pop.	Note	%±

The United States Census Bureau defined Penfield as a census designated place (CDP) in 2023.

== Gallery ==
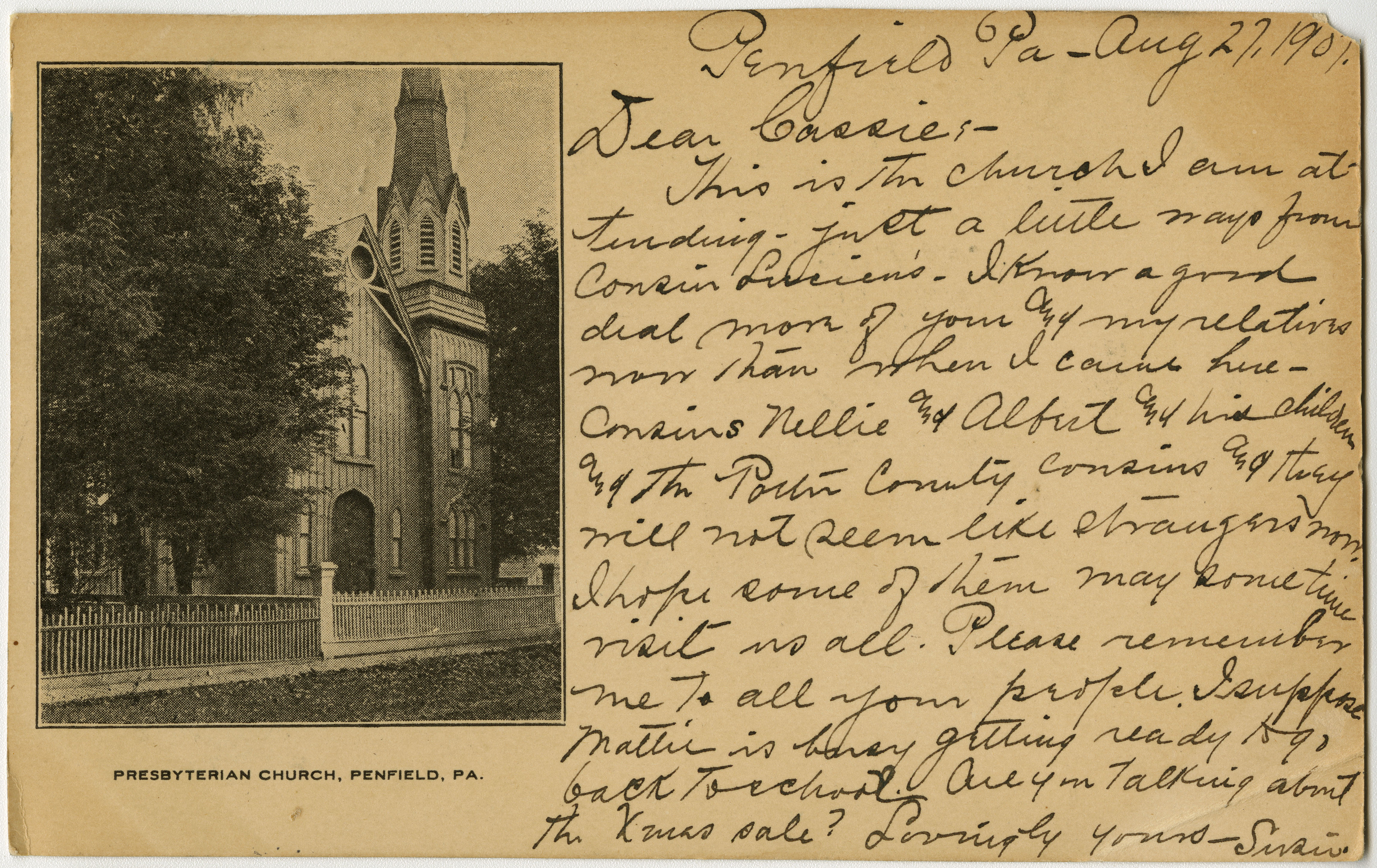
Presbyterian church, 1907 postcard

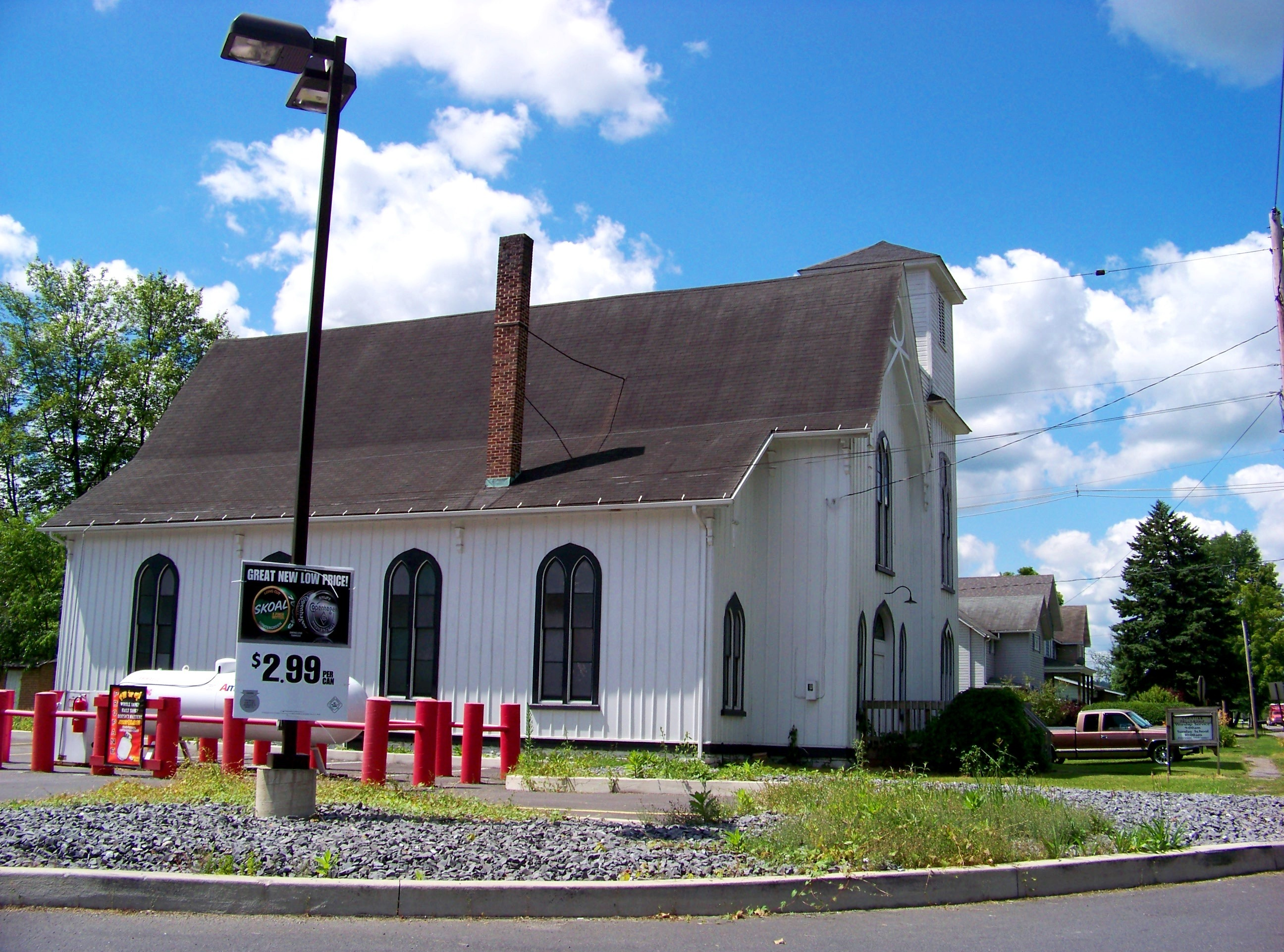
Former Presbyterian church, 2007
