= Conifer, Pennsylvania =

Unincorporated community in Pennsylvania, U.S.

Coordinates: 41°04′59″N 79°08′19″W

Conifer is an unincorporated community in Jefferson County, in the U.S. state of Pennsylvania.

== History ==
Conifer was originally a mining community. A post office called Conifer was established in 1908, and remained in operation until 1930.
