= Elk County, Pennsylvania =

County in Pennsylvania, United States

- County
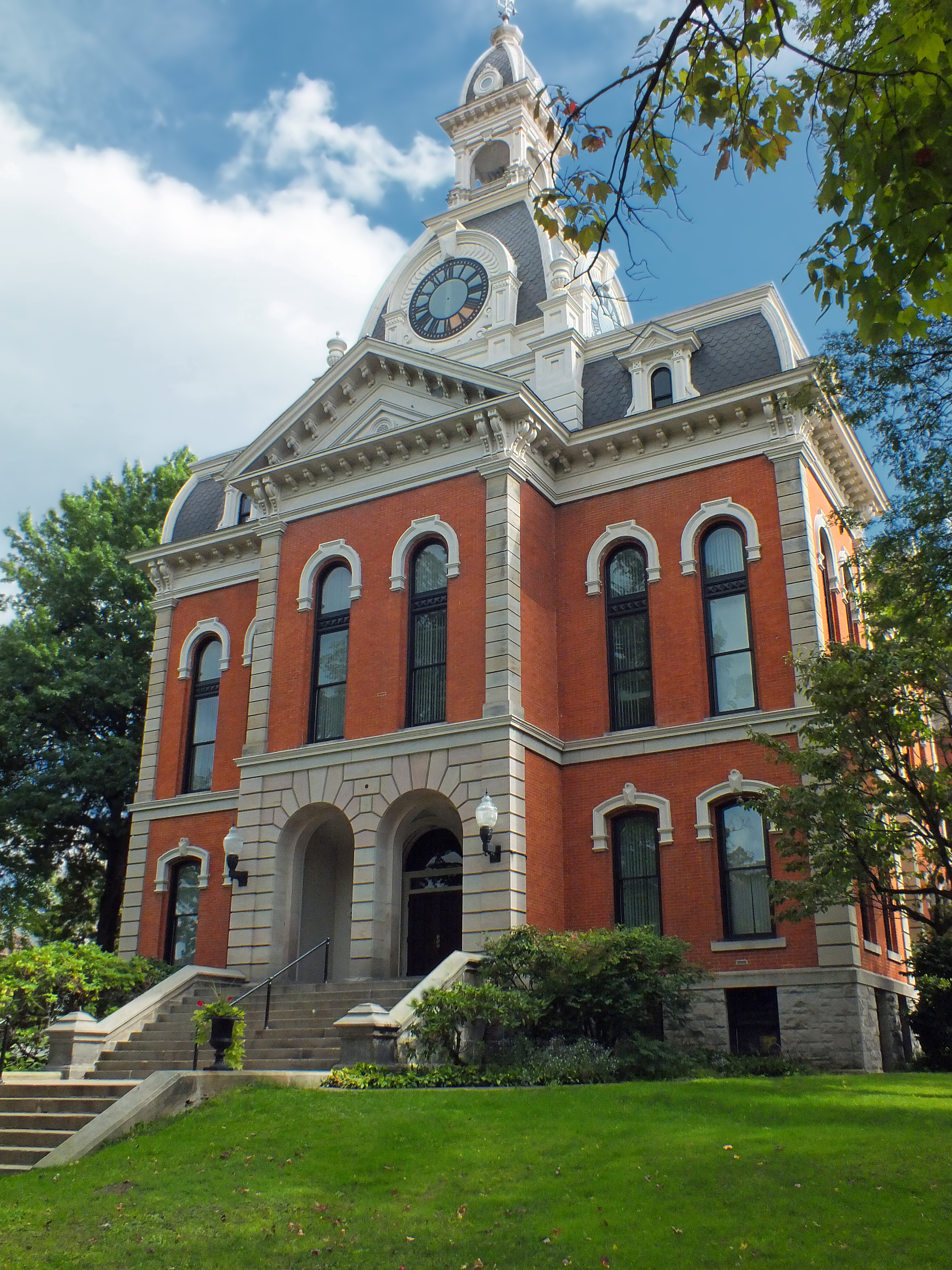
- Elk County Courthouse in Ridgway, Pennsylvania

- Flag Logo

- Location within the U.S. state of Pennsylvania
- Coordinates: 41°25′N 78°39′W
- Country: United States
- State: Pennsylvania
- Founded: April 18, 1843
- Named for: Eastern elk
- Seat: Ridgway
- Largest city: St. Marys

Area
  - Total: 832 sq mi (2,150 km^{2})
  - Land: 827 sq mi (2,140 km^{2})
  - Water: 4.9 sq mi (13 km^{2}) 0.6%

Population (2020)
  - Total: 30,990
  - Estimate (2025): 29,926 ▼
  - Density: 37.5/sq mi (14.5/km^{2})
- Time zone: UTC−5 (Eastern)
  - Summer (DST): UTC−4 (EDT)
- Congressional district: 15th
- Website: countyofelkpa.gov

Elk County is a county in the Commonwealth of Pennsylvania. As of the 2020 United States census, the population was 30,990. Its county seat is Ridgway. The county was created on April 18, 1843, from parts of Jefferson, Clearfield, and McKean Counties. Elk County is named for the now-extinct eastern elk (Cervus canadensis) that historically inhabited the region. The county is part of the North Central region of the commonwealth. (Note: Includes Clearfield, Jefferson, Tioga, McKean, Warren, Clarion, Elk, Potter, Forest and Cameron Counties)

The county is notable for having one of the highest concentrations of Catholics in the United States, with 69% of the county's residents identifying as Catholic.

== Geography ==
Elk County consists of low rolling hills, carved by frequent drainages and heavily wooded.

According to the United States Census Bureau, the county has a total area of 832 square miles (2,150 km^{2}), of which 827 square miles (2,140 km^{2}) is land and 4.9 square miles (13 km^{2}) (0.6%) is water. Elk has a warm-summer humid continental climate (Dfb) and average monthly temperatures in Ridgway range from 23.2 °F in January to 67.4 °F in July, while in Saint Marys they range from 22.6 °F in January to 66.8 °F in July.

=== Adjacent counties ===
- McKean County - north
- Cameron County - east
- Clearfield County - south
- Jefferson County - southwest
- Forest County - west
- Warren County - northwest

=== National protected area ===
- Allegheny National Forest (part)

=== State protected areas ===
- Bendigo State Park
- Elk State Park

=== Major highways ===
- US 219
- US 219 Truck
- PA 66
- PA 120
- PA 153
- PA 255
- PA 321
- PA 555
- PA 948
- PA 949

== Demographics ==
Historical population
Census	Pop.	Note	%±
1850	3,531		—
1860	5,915		67.5%
1870	8,488		43.5%
1880	12,800		50.8%
1890	22,239		73.7%
1900	32,903		48.0%
1910	35,871		9.0%
1920	34,981		−2.5%
1930	33,431		−4.4%
1940	34,443		3.0%
1950	34,503		0.2%
1960	37,328		8.2%
1970	37,770		1.2%
1980	38,338		1.5%
1990	34,878		−9.0%
2000	35,112		0.7%
2010	31,946		−9.0%
2020	30,990		−3.0%
2025 (est.)	29,926	▼	−3.4%

=== Racial and ethnic composition ===
Elk County, Pennsylvania – Racial and ethnic composition Note: the US Census treats Hispanic/Latino as an ethnic category. This table excludes Latinos from the racial categories and assigns them to a separate category. Hispanics/Latinos may be of any race.
Race / Ethnicity (NH = Non-Hispanic)	Pop 1980	Pop 1990	Pop 2000	Pop 2010	Pop 2020	% 1980	% 1990	% 2000	% 2010	% 2020
White alone (NH)	38,167	34,677	34,643	31,345	29,466	99.55%	99.42%	98.66%	98.12%	95.08%
Black or African American alone (NH)	13	15	47	85	74	0.03%	0.04%	0.13%	0.27%	0.24%
Native American or Alaska Native alone (NH)	19	29	32	32	16	0.05%	0.08%	0.09%	0.10%	0.05%
Asian alone (NH)	60	98	120	95	113	0.16%	0.28%	0.34%	0.30%	0.36%
Native Hawaiian or Pacific Islander alone (NH)	x	x	14	5	12	x	x	0.04%	0.02%	0.04%
Other race alone (NH)	16	3	11	14	46	0.04%	0.01%	0.03%	0.04%	0.15%
Mixed race or Multiracial (NH)	x	x	103	187	969	x	x	0.29%	0.59%	3.13%
Hispanic or Latino (any race)	63	56	142	183	294	0.16%	0.16%	0.40%	0.57%	0.95%
Total	38,338	34,878	35,112	31,946	30,990	100.00%	100.00%	100.00%	100.00%	100.00%

=== 2020 census ===
As of the 2020 census, the county had a population of 30,990, a population density of 38 people per square mile (15 people/km^{2}), and 16,836 housing units at an average density of 20 units per square mile (7.7/km^{2}).

The median age was 48.0 years. 18.6% of residents were under the age of 18 and 22.8% of residents were 65 years of age or older. For every 100 females there were 101.4 males, and for every 100 females age 18 and over there were 100.0 males age 18 and over.

44.1% of residents lived in urban areas, while 55.9% lived in rural areas.

There were 13,590 households in the county, of which 23.2% had children under the age of 18 living in them. Of all households, 48.0% were married-couple households, 20.9% were households with a male householder and no spouse or partner present, and 23.9% were households with a female householder and no spouse or partner present. About 31.9% of all households were made up of individuals and 15.0% had someone living alone who was 65 years of age or older. There were 16,836 housing units, of which 19.3% were vacant. Among occupied housing units, 78.1% were owner-occupied and 21.9% were renter-occupied. The homeowner vacancy rate was 1.4% and the rental vacancy rate was 8.1%.

The racial makeup of the county was 95.4% White, 0.3% Black or African American, 0.1% American Indian and Alaska Native, 0.4% Asian, <0.1% Native Hawaiian and Pacific Islander, 0.3% from some other race, and 3.6% from two or more races. Hispanic or Latino residents of any race comprised 0.9% of the population.

Population pyramid

=== 2000 census ===
As of the 2000 census, there were 14,124 households, out of which 31.00% had children under the age of 18 living with them, 56.00% were married couples living together, 8.70% had a female householder with no husband present, and 31.00% were non-families. 27.30% of all households were made up of individuals, and 13.60% had someone living alone who was 65 years of age or older. The average household size was 2.45 and the average family size was 2.99.

The 2000 census reported that the county population contained 24.00% under the age of 18, 6.80% from 18 to 24, 28.60% from 25 to 44, 23.30% from 45 to 64, and 17.30% who were 65 years of age or older. The median age was 39 years. For every 100 females there were 98.00 males. For every 100 females aged 18 and over, there were 95.30 males.

== Economy ==
As of the 2021 ACS 5-Year Estimates, Elk County's largest industry and source of employment is manufacturing, with the second largest being educational services, healthcare, and social services.

== Government and politics ==
United States presidential election results for Elk County, Pennsylvania
Year	Republican		Democratic		Third party(ies)	
Year	No.	%	No.	%	No.	%
1888	1,321	41.09%	1,824	56.73%	70	2.18%
1892	1,438	38.94%	2,126	57.57%	129	3.49%
1896	2,807	49.57%	2,717	47.98%	139	2.45%
1900	3,254	50.06%	3,105	47.77%	141	2.17%
1904	3,820	55.25%	2,857	41.32%	237	3.43%
1908	2,991	51.52%	2,531	43.60%	283	4.88%
1912	603	10.50%	2,057	35.82%	3,082	53.67%
1916	2,829	52.34%	2,186	40.44%	390	7.22%
1920	5,267	66.14%	2,093	26.28%	604	7.58%
1924	6,626	70.85%	1,370	14.65%	1,356	14.50%
1928	5,234	40.23%	7,705	59.23%	70	0.54%
1932	5,797	46.39%	6,461	51.70%	239	1.91%
1936	5,489	35.12%	9,035	57.80%	1,107	7.08%
1940	6,949	49.99%	6,920	49.78%	31	0.22%
1944	5,645	47.80%	6,097	51.63%	67	0.57%
1948	5,148	48.98%	5,363	51.02%	0	0.00%
1952	7,702	54.26%	6,448	45.42%	45	0.32%
1956	8,947	61.84%	5,498	38.00%	23	0.16%
1960	7,155	45.96%	8,398	53.95%	14	0.09%
1964	4,354	29.36%	10,455	70.51%	19	0.13%
1968	6,193	44.09%	6,886	49.02%	967	6.88%
1972	7,900	61.20%	4,710	36.49%	298	2.31%
1976	6,159	46.98%	6,713	51.21%	237	1.81%
1980	7,175	52.49%	5,898	43.15%	596	4.36%
1984	8,470	60.47%	5,486	39.17%	51	0.36%
1988	6,737	52.86%	5,879	46.13%	128	1.00%
1992	4,908	35.48%	5,016	36.26%	3,908	28.25%
1996	4,889	37.57%	5,749	44.18%	2,375	18.25%
2000	7,347	54.10%	5,754	42.37%	479	3.53%
2004	7,872	54.10%	6,602	45.37%	76	0.52%
2008	6,676	46.48%	7,290	50.76%	396	2.76%
2012	7,579	57.08%	5,463	41.14%	237	1.78%
2016	10,025	68.91%	3,853	26.49%	669	4.60%
2020	12,140	71.64%	4,522	26.68%	284	1.68%
2024	12,543	72.87%	4,483	26.04%	187	1.09%

Chart of Voter Registration
1. Republican (58.3%)
2. Democratic (29.8%)
3. Independent (7.95%)
4. Other Parties (3.94%)

=== Voter demographics ===
Elk County used to be competitive in statewide and national elections. The county frequently voted with the eventual winner of national elections, from 1920 to 2008, except for 1928, 1940, and 1968. In the 21st century, its Catholic identity has been replaced by its rural identity in defining how it votes; its longtime Democratic voter registration advantage was taken over by Republicans in 2018. The county voted for Mitt Romney by 16 points in 2012, then swung over 25 points to the right and voted for Donald Trump by 42 points in 2016, before swinging further right in 2020 and voting for Trump by 45 points.

Voter registration and party enrollment
As of May 18, 2026
Party	Number of Voters	Percentage
Republican	12,123	59.20%
Democratic	5,817	28.40%
Independent	1,749	8.54%
Third Party	787	3.84%
Total	20,476

Pennsylvania Gubernatorial election results for Elk County
Year	Republican		Democratic		Third party(ies)	
Year	No.	%	No.	%	No.	%
1970	3,938	35.18%	6,995	62.49%	261	2.33%
1974	5,444	52.59%	4,794	46.31%	114	1.10%
1978	4,781	40.80%	6,893	58.83%	43	0.37%
1982	5,564	48.19%	5,917	51.25%	65	0.56%
1986	4,818	38.70%	7,523	60.42%	110	0.88%
1990	2,575	22.72%	8,757	77.28%	0	0.00%
1994	4,784	43.31%	3,229	29.23%	3,033	27.46%
1998	4,520	49.43%	2,500	27.34%	2,124	23.23%
2002	5,468	57.05%	3,917	40.87%	200	2.09%
2006	4,499	39.44%	6,907	60.56%	0	0.00%
2010	6,374	61.83%	3,935	38.17%	0	0.00%
2014	4,536	51.49%	4,273	48.51%	0	0.00%
2018	6,918	61.22%	4,206	37.22%	177	1.57%
2022	8,597	62.85%	4,843	35.41%	238	1.74%

United States Senate election results for Elk County, Pennsylvania1
Year	Republican		Democratic		Third party(ies)	
Year	No.	%	No.	%	No.	%
1994	5,783	52.44%	4,560	41.35%	684	6.20%
2000	7,586	57.04%	5,316	39.97%	397	2.99%
2006	4,192	36.99%	7,142	63.01%	0	0.00%
2012	7,182	54.50%	5,611	42.58%	386	2.93%
2018	6,610	58.59%	4,498	39.87%	174	1.54%
2024	11,939	69.75%	4,679	27.34%	499	2.92%

United States Senate election results for Elk County, Pennsylvania3
Year	Republican		Democratic		Third party(ies)	
Year	No.	%	No.	%	No.	%
1992	6,135	44.62%	6,607	48.05%	1,008	7.33%
1998	5,175	56.89%	3,597	39.54%	324	3.56%
2004	8,111	56.88%	5,185	36.36%	963	6.75%
2010	5,638	55.12%	4,591	44.88%	0	0.00%
2016	8,703	60.76%	4,509	31.48%	1,111	7.76%
2022	9,128	67.02%	4,066	29.86%	425	3.12%

=== County commissioners ===
- M. Fritz Lecker, Republican
- Matthew G. Quesenberry, Democrat
- Gregory J. Gebauer, Republican

=== Other county offices ===
- Clerk of Courts and Prothonotary, Susanne Schneider, Republican
- Coroner, Michelle Muccio, Republican
- District Attorney, Beau Grove, Republican
- Register of Wills and Recorder of Deeds, Lee Neureiter, Republican
- Sheriff, Todd Caltagarone, Republican
- Treasurer, Matthew Frey, Republican
- Board of Auditors, Sandra A. Caltagarone, Republican; Jean Zore, Republican; Siobhan Voss, Democrat

=== State representative ===
- Mike Armanini, Republican, 75th district

=== State senator ===
- Cris Dush, Republican, 25th district

=== United States representative ===
- Glenn "G.T." Thompson, Republican, 15th district

=== United States senators ===
- John Fetterman, Democrat
- Dave McCormick, Republican

== Education ==
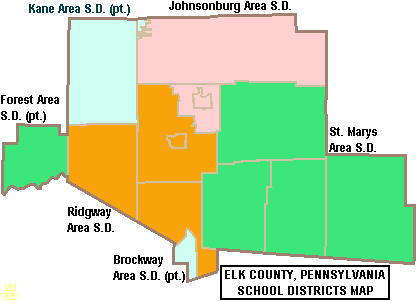
Map of Elk County, Pennsylvania School Districts

=== Community education center ===
The Community Education Center of Elk and Cameron Counties (or CEC) provides credit, non-credit, and enrichment programs.

=== Public school districts ===
School districts include:

- Brockway Area School District
- Forest Area School District
- Johnsonburg Area School District
- Kane Area School District
- Ridgway Area School District
- Saint Marys Area School District

=== Private schools ===
- Elk County Catholic High School
- St Boniface School - Kersey
- St Leo School - Ridgway
- St Marys Catholic Elementary School = Saint Marys
- St Marys Catholic Middle School = Saint Marys
- North Central Workforce Investment Board - Ridgway
- Anne Forbes Nursery School - Ridgway

=== Libraries ===
- Elk County Library System - Saint Marys
- Johnsonburg Public Library - Johnsonburg
- Ridgway Free Public Library - Ridgway
- Saint Marys Public Library - Saint Marys
- Tri State Coll Library Co-Op - Rosemont
- Wilcox Public Library - Wilcox

== Communities ==
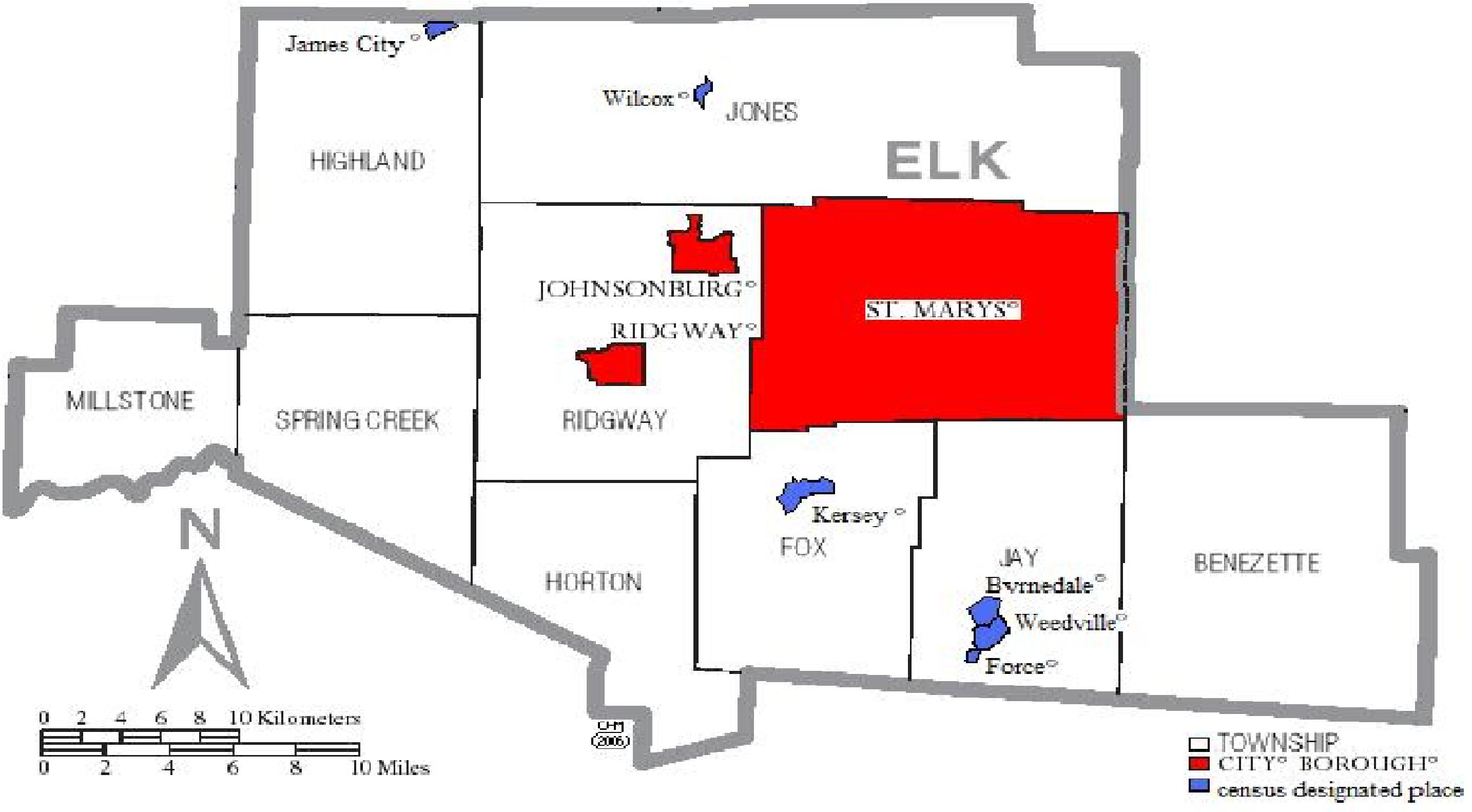
Elk County boroughs and municipalities

Under Pennsylvania law, there are four types of incorporated municipalities: cities, boroughs, townships, and, in at most two cases, towns. The following cities, boroughs, and townships are located in Elk County:

=== City ===
- St. Marys

=== Boroughs ===
- Johnsonburg
- Ridgway (county seat)

=== Census-designated places ===
Census-designated places are geographical areas designated by the U.S. Census Bureau for the purposes of compiling demographic data. They are not actual jurisdictions under Pennsylvania law. Other unincorporated communities, such as villages, may be listed here as well.

- Byrnedale
- Force
- James City
- Kersey
- Weedville
- Wilcox

=== Unincorporated communities ===
- Arroyo
- Dagus Mines
- Loleta
- Portland Mills

=== Townships ===
- Benezette
- Fox
- Highland
- Horton
- Jay
- Jones
- Millstone
- Ridgway
- Spring Creek

=== Former Townships ===
- Benzinger - consolidated with St. Marys borough in 1992.

=== Population ranking ===
The population ranking of the following table is based on the 2010 census of Elk County.

† county seat

Rank	City/Town/etc.	Municipal type	Population (2010 Census)
1	St. Marys	City	13,070
2	† Ridgway	Borough	4,078
3	Johnsonburg	Borough	2,483
4	Kersey	CDP	937
5	Weedville	CDP	542
6	Byrnedale	CDP	427
7	Wilcox	CDP	383
8	James City	CDP	287
9	Force	CDP	253

== See also ==
- National Register of Historic Places listings in Elk County, Pennsylvania
