= Jay Township, Pennsylvania =

Township in Pennsylvania, United States

Coordinates: 41°23′00″N 78°30′59″W

- Township
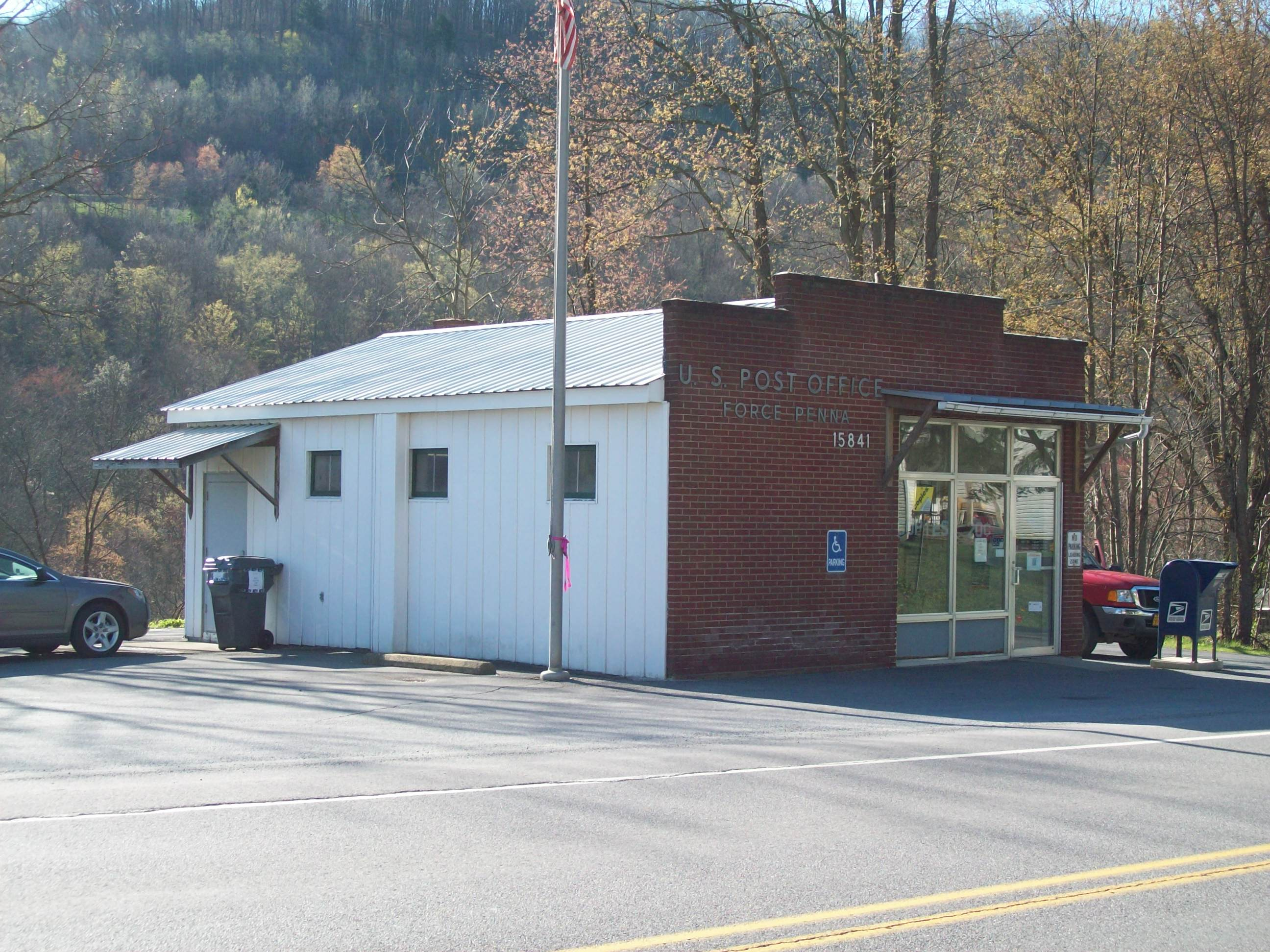
- Post office at Force

- Location in Elk County and the state of Pennsylvania.
- Country: United States
- State: Pennsylvania
- County: Elk
- Settled: 1815
- Incorporated: 1843

Area
  - Total: 67.93 sq mi (175.94 km^{2})
  - Land: 67.70 sq mi (175.34 km^{2})
  - Water: 0.23 sq mi (0.59 km^{2})

Population (2020)
  - Total: 1,961
  - Estimate (2022): 1,922
  - Density: 28.97/sq mi (11.18/km^{2})
- FIPS code: 42-047-37760
- Website: www.jaytownship.com

Jay Township is a township in Elk County, Pennsylvania, United States. The population was 1,961 at the 2020 census, down from 2,072 in 2010.

== Geography ==
Jay Township is in southeastern Elk County, bordered by Fox Township to the west, the city of St. Marys to the north, Benezette Township to the east, and Lawrence and Huston townships to the south in Clearfield County. According to the United States Census Bureau, Jay Township has a total area of 67.9 square miles (175.9 km^{2}), of which 67.7 square miles (175.3 km^{2}) is land and 0.23 square miles (0.6 km^{2}), or 0.34%, is water. The Bennett Branch Sinnemahoning Creek, part of the West Branch Susquehanna River watershed, flows through the southeast part of the township.

The unincorporated communities of Force, Weedville, Byrnedale, Scattertown, and Caledonia are located in Jay Township.

== Demographics ==
Historical population
Census	Pop.	Note	%±
2000	2,094		—
2010	2,072		−1.1%
2020	1,961		−5.4%
2022 (est.)	1,922		−2.0%
U.S. Decennial Census

As of the census of 2000, there were 2,094 people, 873 households, and 592 families residing in the township. The population density was 30.9 inhabitants per square mile (11.9/km^{2}). There were 1,195 housing units at an average density of 17.6 units per square mile (6.8 units/km^{2}). The racial makeup of the township was 99.57% White, 0.05% African American, 0.05% Native American, 0.05% Asian, and 0.29% from two or more races. Hispanic or Latino of any race were 0.67% of the population.

There were 873 households, out of which 28.1% had children under the age of 18 living with them, 56.6% were married couples living together, 7.1% had a female householder with no husband present, and 32.1% were non-families. 27.5% of all households were made up of individuals, and 14.9% had someone living alone who was 65 years of age or older. The average household size was 2.40 and the average family size was 2.94.

In the township the population was spread out, with 22.6% under the age of 18, 5.7% from 18 to 24, 28.6% from 25 to 44, 23.8% from 45 to 64, and 19.2% who were 65 years of age or older. The median age was 41 years. For every 100 females there were 97.7 males. For every 100 females age 18 and over, there were 94.9 males.

The median income for a household in the township was $32,601, and the median income for a family was $40,455. Males had a median income of $31,684 versus $22,336 for females. The per capita income for the township was $15,893. About 6.1% of families and 8.6% of the population were below the poverty line, including 11.3% of those under age 18 and 6.7% of those age 65 or over.
