= Bennett Branch Sinnemahoning Creek =

River in Pennsylvania, United States

Coordinates: 41°20′10″N 78°08′00″W

Bennett Branch Sinnemahoning Creek is a tributary of Sinnemahoning Creek in the U.S. state of Pennsylvania.

The Bennett Branch runs 43.7 miles (70.3 km) from headwaters east of DuBois, northeast to its confluence with the Driftwood Branch to form Sinnemahoning Creek.

== Course and tributaries ==
Laurel Run joins the Bennett Branch near the community of Caledonia, Elk County.

Trout Run joins approximately 7.5 miles (12.1 km) downstream at the community of Benezette, Elk County.

The Bennett Branch continues for 17.6 miles (28.3 km) to join the Driftwood Branch at the borough of Driftwood to form Sinnemahoning Creek.

== See also ==
- List of rivers of Pennsylvania
