= Kane Area School District =

School district in Pennsylvania

Coordinates: 41.65649°N 78.88183°W

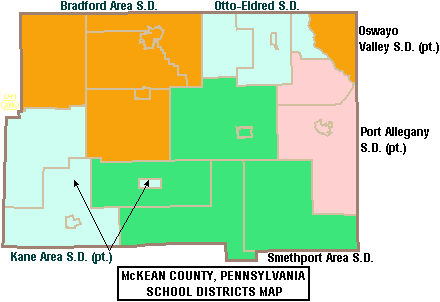

Address
- 400 West Hemlock Avenue Kane, McKean County and Elk County, Pennsylvania, 16735-1696; United States

District information
- Type: Public

Other information
- Website: http://www.kasd.net

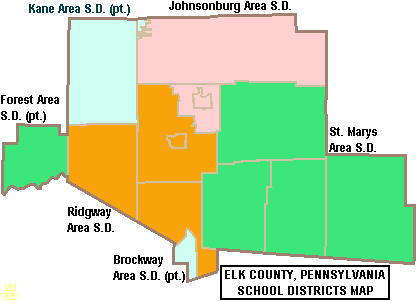
School District region in Elk County

The Kane Area School District is a small, rural, public school district in southwestern McKean County and in parts of Elk County in northwestern Pennsylvania, United States, in the middle of the Allegheny National Forest.

The district encompasses an area of approximately 250 square miles (650 km^{2}). The district serves: Hamilton Township, Highland Township, Jones Township, Kane, Ludlow - Mount Jewett, Wetmore Township and James City. According to 2010 federal census data, it serves a resident population of 7,436. Per the US Census Bureau in 2000, it served a resident population of 8,152 people. The educational attainment levels for the School District population (25 years old and over) were 87% high school graduates and 14% college graduates.

In 2009, the district residents’ per capita income was $16,573, while the median family income was $39,826. In the Commonwealth, the median family income was $49,501 and the United States median family income was $49,445, in 2010. In McKean County, the median household income was $41,351. By 2013, the median household income in the United States rose to $52,100.

== Schools ==
The Kane Area School District operates three schools: Kane Area Elementary School (K-5), Kane Area Middle School (6-8) and Kane Area High School (9-12).

== Extracurricular activities ==
Kane Area School District has many varsity and junior varsity sports. All athletic contests are under the jurisdiction of the Pennsylvania Interscholastic Athletic Association rules and regulations for that particular sport.

There are also a variety of non-athletic activities available to students throughout the district.

The Kane Wolves won the Allegheny Mountain League football championship in November, 2007 and were 10-0 for the season. It was the first 10-win season in Kane history. The team's football coach—Jason Barner—was named AML Coach-of-the-Year.

Kane High School's football team achieved a remarkable milestone by completing the 1963 season with a perfect 9–0 record, marking their first undefeated season. This achievement was under the leadership of head coach Bernie McQuown, who guided the team to a 7–1 record in 1963, 6–3 in 1964, and 6–2–1 in 1965.

Kane High School secured the 1949 Pennsylvania Interscholastic Athletic Association (PIAA) Class B boys' basketball state championship by defeating Ashley High School 45-44. The game concluded with a controversial last-second basket by Kane, leading to a protest from Ashley. After a thorough review, the PIAA upheld Kane's victory.

The 1949 Kane Wolves basketball team included notable players such as Jimmy Thompson, Bud Daly, Pat Scordo, Fred Pearson, Ken Carlson, Don Frase, Doug 'Legs' Erickson, Jim Bovard, and Bill Forsyth. The team's remarkable season culminated in the state championship, with Thompson, Daly, Bovard, and Erickson collectively surpassing 1,000 points that year.

For a comprehensive overview of PIAA boys' basketball champions, including the 1949 Class B title, you can refer to the PIAA's official archives.

Kane High School's boys' soccer team achieved remarkable success between 2002 and 2006, securing five consecutive Upper Allegheny Valley Soccer League (UAVSL) championships.

== Notable people ==
- Chuck Daly, basketball coach
- Amy Rudolph, Olympic runner
