= Pennsylvania Route 321 =

State highway in Elk and McKean counties in Pennsylvania, United States

Pennsylvania Route 321

Route information
- Maintained by PennDOT
- Length: 43.829 mi (70.536 km)
- Existed: December 7, 1961–present
- Tourist routes: Longhouse National Scenic Byway

Major junctions
- South end: US 219 in Wilcox
- US 6 in Kane; PA 59 in Klondike
- North end: PA 346 in Corydon Township

Location
- Country: United States
- State: Pennsylvania
- Counties: Elk, McKean

Highway system
- Pennsylvania State Route System; Interstate; US; State; Scenic; Legislative
← PA 320	→ US 322

Pennsylvania Route 321 (PA 321) is a 43.8-mile-long (70.5 km) state highway located in Elk and McKean counties in the U.S. state of Pennsylvania, maintained by the Pennsylvania Department of Transportation (PennDOT). The southern terminus is at U.S. Route 219 (US 219) in the community of Wilcox. The northern terminus is at PA 346 within the Allegheny National Forest. PA 321 heads northwest from Wilcox through rural areas to the borough of Kane, where it forms a brief concurrency with US 6. North of here, the route passes through the national forest and runs along the shore of the Allegheny Reservoir. PA 321 runs east briefly with PA 59 before winding north through more forest to its northern terminus. A portion of the route along the Allegheny Reservoir is designated as the Longhouse National Scenic Byway, a Pennsylvania Scenic Byway and National Forest Scenic Byway.

The road between Wilcox and Kane was designated as part of Legislative Route 97 (LR 97) in 1911 and as part of PA 6 in 1924. US 119 became concurrent with PA 6 in 1926 before US 219 replaced both designations on this stretch of road two years later. The road between Kane and Kinzua was built in the late 1920s and became an extension of PA 68 in 1935. In 1952, US 219 was relocated off the road between Wilcox and Kane. Plans were made to construct the Kinzua Dam in 1960, and several new roads would need to be built to accommodate the reservoir including a relocation of PA 68. In 1961, the PA 321 designation was approved for the unnumbered road between Wilcox and Kane and PA 68 between Kane and Kinzua in order to provide an access road to the planned recreation area; signs were posted the following year.

In the mid-1960s, improvements were planned for PA 321. The PA 321 designation north of Kane was removed in 1966. In the late 1960s, the section between 4 miles (6.4 km) north of Kane and PA 346 was constructed, including a new alignment between Red Bridge and PA 59. Work on the 4-mile (6.4 km) segment north of Kane took place in the early 1970s. In Kane, PA 321 was relocated from following US 6 through the downtown area to use Hacker Street to the east, with reconstruction finished in 1973. The road between Wilcox and Kane, including a bypass of the former, was rebuilt in the mid-1970s. In 1974, PA 321 was extended from US 6 in Kane north to PA 346.

== Route description ==
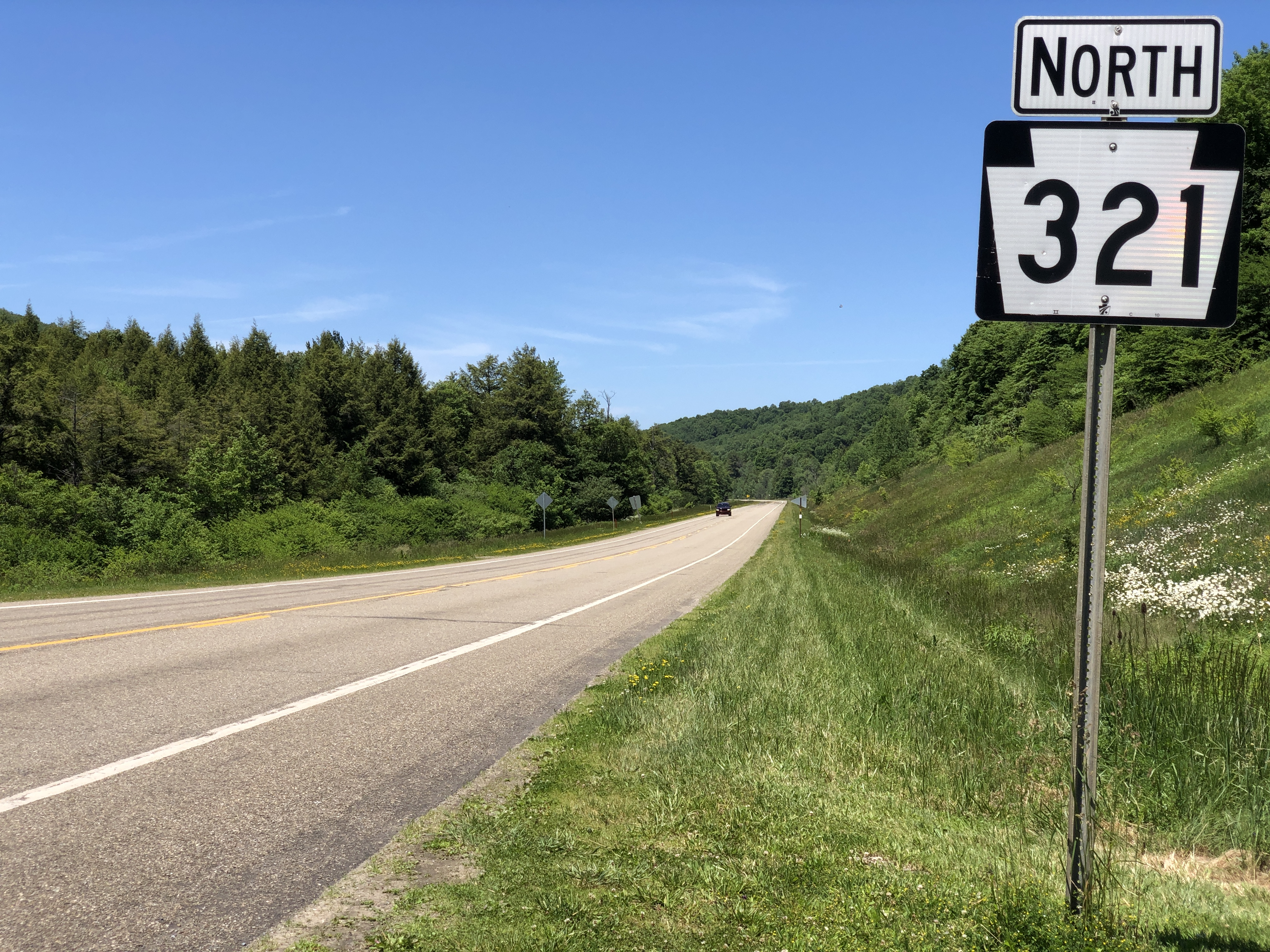
PA 321 northbound in Jones Township

PA 321 begins at an intersection with US 219 in the community of Wilcox in Jones Township, Elk County, heading north on two-lane undivided Buena Vista Highway. The road bypasses the center of Wilcox to the west as it passes through an industrial area. The highway crosses the West Branch Clarion River and curves northwest into forests. The route runs through Dahoga and continues along the eastern border of Allegheny National Forest, with a Buffalo and Pittsburgh Railroad line a short distance to the west of the road.

PA 321 enters Wetmore Township in McKean County and becomes Brickyard Road, departing the Allegheny National Forest. The road continues through rural land, passing through Sergeant and East Kane. The route heads into the borough of Kane and becomes Westerberg Way, running through industrial areas as it crosses an abandoned railroad line and comes to an intersection with US 6. Here, PA 321 turns west briefly for a concurrency with US 6 on Biddle Street, immediately turning north-northwest onto Hacker Street, where it is lined with homes. After passing Glenwood Park, the road curves northeast as Kinzua Avenue and leaves Kane for Wetmore Township, becoming Kane-Marshburg Road and heading north-northwest into wooded areas. The route re-enters the Allegheny National Forest and continues northwest, crossing into Hamilton Township and intersecting Longhouse Drive.

PA 321 comes to a bridge over the Kinzua Creek arm of the Allegheny Reservoir near the Red Bridge Recreation Area, which contains a picnic area, a campground, and a bank fishing area. From here, the highway follows the northeastern shore of the reservoir, passing through Dunkle Corners. The road turns to the east and runs along the south shore of Chappel Bay, soon heading away from the reservoir and turning northeast. The route continues into Corydon Township and reaches an intersection with PA 59 near the Bradford Ranger Station.

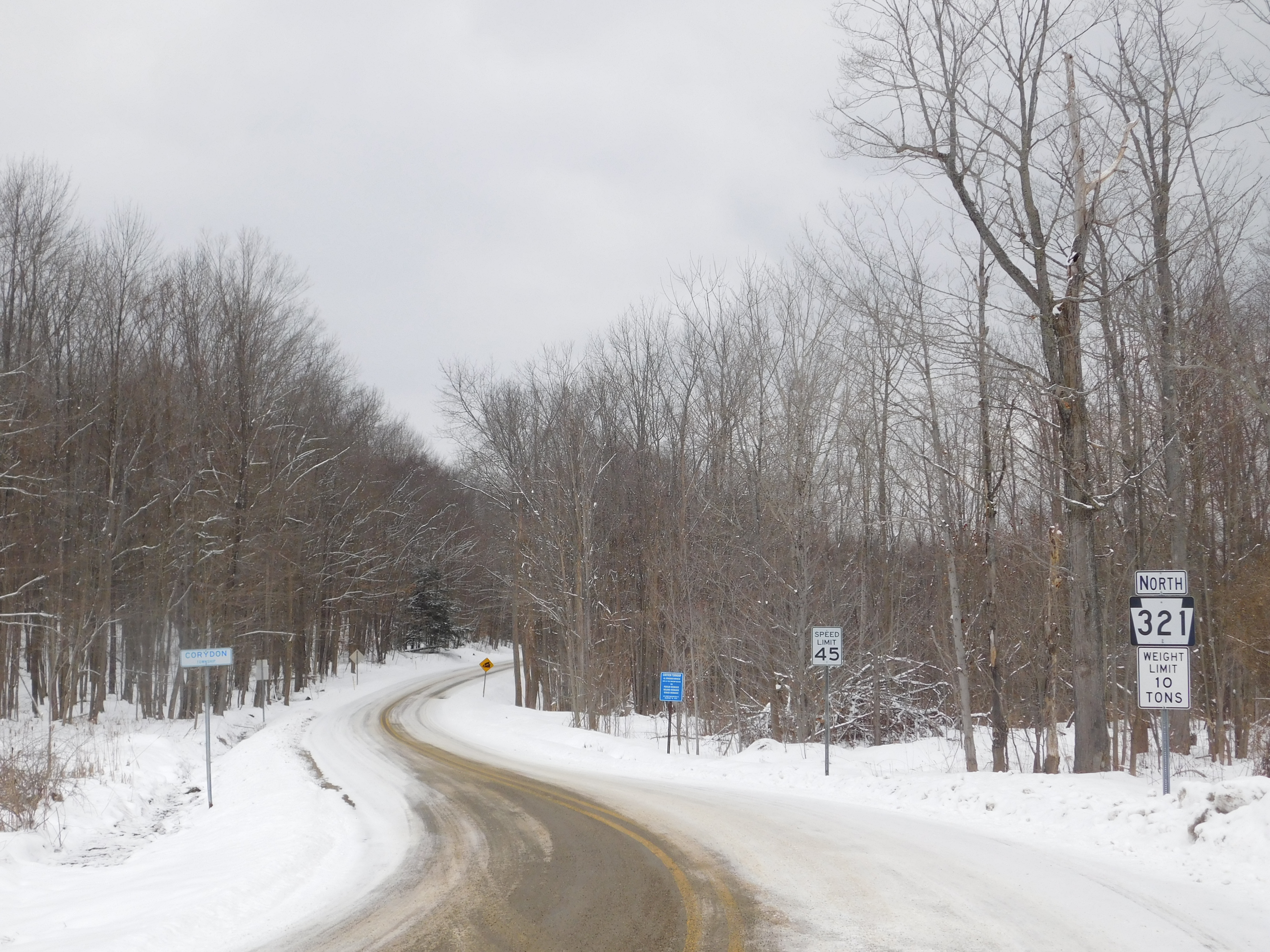
PA 321 northbound in Corydon Township

At this point, PA 321 turns east for a concurrency with PA 59 and the name remains Kane-Marshburg Road. The road leaves the national forest and heads through the community of Klondike before PA 321 splits to the northwest onto Sugar Run Road in Lafayette Township. The road crosses back into Corydon Township and runs through more of the Allegheny National Forest. The route passes to the north of a section of the Allegheny Reservoir again and turns to the northeast. PA 321 winds north and serves the Tracy Ridge Trailhead, which consists of a campground and hiking trails leading to the reservoir. The route comes to its northern terminus at PA 346 a short distance south of the New York border.

The portion of PA 321 between Longhouse Drive and PA 59 is part of the Longhouse National Scenic Byway, a Pennsylvania Scenic Byway and National Forest Scenic Byway that encircles the Kinzua Creek arm of the Allegheny Reservoir and serves multiple recreational areas. In 2015, PA 321 had an annual average daily traffic count ranging from a high of 4,300 vehicles along the US 6 concurrency in Kane to a low of 100 vehicles between PA 59 and PA 346. The portion of PA 321 that is concurrent with US 6 is part of the National Highway System.

== History ==
The PA 321 designation was approved by the Pennsylvania Department of Highways (PDH) in 1961, replacing what was known as "Old 219" between Wilcox and Kane and a portion of PA 68 between Kane and Kinzua; signs were installed the following year. Plans for improving PA 321 were announced in 1963, including a new alignment north of Red Bridge to PA 59 that would follow the shore of the Allegheny Reservoir. In 1965, construction began on a portion of the road between north of Kane and Red Bridge. Signage for PA 321 north of Kane was removed in 1966. The portion of PA 321 in the Red Bridge area was completed in 1966 while the section south of Red Bridge to north of Kane was finished the following year. In 1967, construction began on the new alignment between Red Bridge and PA 59, which was finished the next year. The road between PA 59 near Marshburg and the New York border was completed in 1968. Construction of the 4-mile (6.4 km) of PA 321 north of Kane took place between 1970 and 1971. Construction of the section of PA 321 between East Kane and Kane and along Hacker Streey in Kane occurred from 1972 to 1973. The final section of the route between Wilcox and East Kane was rebuilt between 1972 and 1975.

=== Designation ===
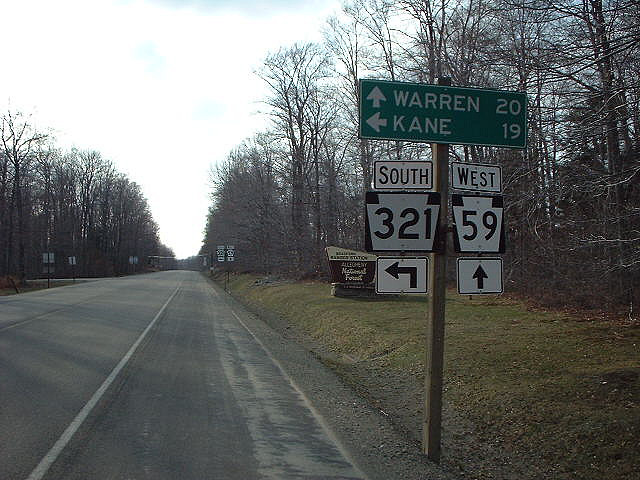
PA 321 southbound at split with PA 59 westbound in Corydon Township

Following the passage of the Sproul Road Bill in 1911, the highway between Wilcox and Kane was incorporated as part of LR 97. The Wilcox-Kane road was built in the mid-1920s. In 1925, this roadway became a part of PA 6 (the Buffalo-Pittsburgh Highway), which ran from the Maryland border near Meyersdale north to Bradford. With the creation of the U.S. Highway System on November 11, 1926, US 119 was cosigned with PA 6 on this stretch of road. US 219 replaced the US 119/PA 6 designation between Wilcox and Kane in 1928. The roadway between Kane and Red Bridge was improved by Works Progress Administration labor between 1929 and 1930 in order to "get the rural areas 'out of the mud'." The road was built with a soft stone base that would not handle the heavier traffic volumes that would later use the road. This section of highway was patched by the state several times in order to keep it usable for traffic. The road between Kane and Kinzua became a northward extension of PA 68 in 1935. Plans were announced in 1949 for a direct alignment of US 219 between Wilcox and Lantz Corners to bypass the westerly jog to Kane. In 1952, US 219 was relocated off the roadway between Wilcox and Kane and US 6 between Kane and Lantz Corners to use the new direct alignment.

In 1960, plans were made to construct the Kinzua Dam in the Allegheny National Forest, with road relocations necessary for the new reservoir that would be formed. Among the roads that would need to be moved was PA 68 between Kane and Kinzua. The route was to be relocated to follow the shore of the reservoir before coming to an intersection with PA 59. This new road would provide access to the Kinzua Dam from Kane. A meeting was held on February 24, 1960, between state and federal officials to discuss the road relocations for the dam construction, including PA 68. Plans were announced in March 1961 to repave "Old Route 219" between Wilcox and Kane, with completion planned for the summer. The next month, the Special Highways Committee of the Kane Chamber of Commerce planned to meet with the supervisor of the Allegheny National Forest to discuss access roads to the Kinzua Dam. Among the ideas offered was extending PA 255 from Johnsonburg north to Kane, running concurrent with US 219 between Johnsonburg and Wilcox and following the unnumbered road between Wilcox and Kane. By May of that year, no decision was made on how PA 68 would be routed to the north of Red Bridge with the construction of the Kinzua Dam.

In 1961, the Special Highways Committee recommended a new designation for LR 97 between Wilcox and Kane, which was known as "Old 219", along with improving the Wilcox-Kane road and PA 68 between Kane and Red Bridge. A new road was favored north of Red Bridge to serve the proposed recreational area at the Allegheny Reservoir. The PA 321 designation was approved by the PDH on December 7 of that year. The route replaced LR 97 between Wilcox and Kane, where it joined US 6 and followed that route to the Easton Street intersection. Between Kane and Kinzua, PA 321 replaced a section of PA 68, with the northern terminus of PA 68 cut back to US 6/PA 321 at the intersection of Fraley and Greeves streets in Kane. The new designation was suggested by the president of the Kane Chamber of Commerce, Victor Westerberg, to provide a connection to the Kinzua Dam via Kane. The roadway north of Kane was also designated as LR 42003. PA 321 was signed between Wilcox and Kinzua in May 1962.

Signage for PA 321 from Kane northward had been removed by March 1966 as that section of road was under construction, with the northern terminus of the route moved to US 6 at the south end of Kane. In April 1968, signage was installed in Kane pointing the way to the Kinzua Dam via US 6; PA 321 remained unsigned pending the completion of the road north of Kane. With the construction of PA 321, the route remained unsigned north of Kane. In addition, there were a lack of signs at the PA 59 intersection pointing the way to Kane and a lack of signage in Kane directing motorists to attractions in the Kinzua Dam area. Also, a 1972 map from the Pennsylvania Game Commission incorrectly labeled PA 66 north into Kane along with the road between Kane and the Kinzua Dam area as PA 68. Plans were announced to improve signage between the two points in September 1972. In June 1974, PA 321 was signed between US 6 in Kane and PA 346 near the New York border. On May 7, 1990, the portion of PA 321 between Longhouse Drive and PA 59 was designated as the Longhouse National Scenic Byway, a National Forest Scenic Byway.

=== Planning ===
When PA 321 was designated in 1961, improvement work along the section between Kane and Wilcox along with the portion between Kane and Red Bridge was planned for spring 1962. In February 1963, the U.S. Army Corps of Engineers (USACE) and the Allegheny National Forest agreed that PA 321 would be relocated to a new alignment following the shore of the reservoir north to PA 59.

On June 20, 1963, officials from the borough of Kane met with district highway engineer Stanton Funk to determine the progress of improving PA 321. At that time, no progress had been made on improving the route. The state had no plans to build the new alignment of PA 321 north of Red Bridge; a tentative route was decided upon but no work had begun. As a result of this meeting, Kane borough officials voted on July 1 to protest both Governor William Scranton and the Pennsylvania General Assembly for the state bypassing Kane and not improving the roads in the area. The construction of PA 59 to provide access to the dam provided a shortcut to US 6 between Warren and Smethport, along with the US 219 bypass through Lantz Corners to Wilcox, kept traffic heading to the dam away from Kane. Therefore, the state determined that they did not need to improve the highways in the Kane area. However, Kane officials felt improving PA 321 would provide better access to the dam and would boost tourism to their town.

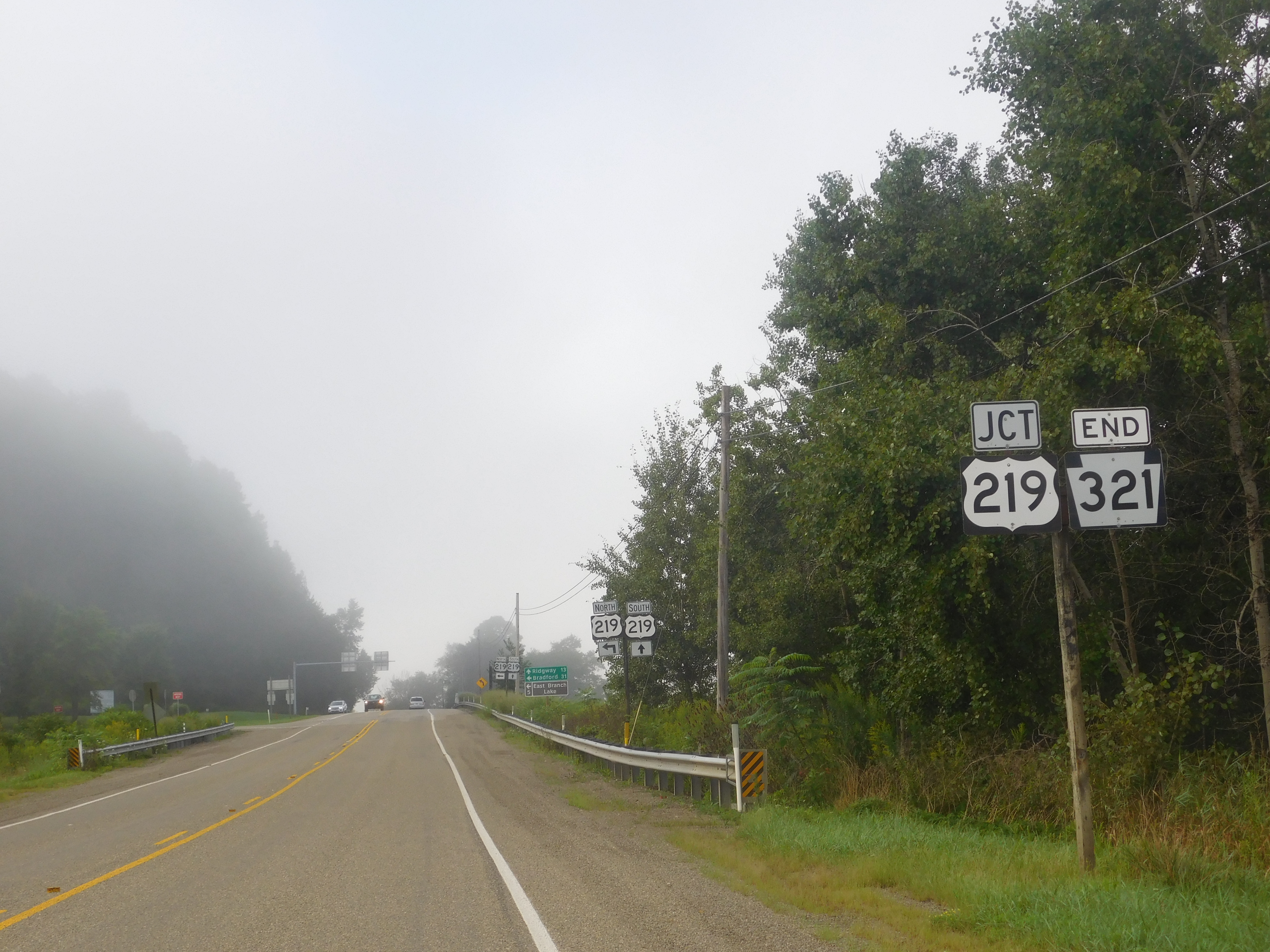
PA 321 heading south to its terminus at US 219 in Wilcox

On November 2, 1963, plans were revealed by Representative Albert W. Johnson to improve PA 321. With these plans, the portion of the route between Wilcox and Kane would have several curves eliminated. In Kane, the curbs on the portion of US 6/PA 321 running along Fraley Street would be replaced. The section of PA 321 between Kane and Red Bridge, known as the Kinzua Road, was resurveyed in summer 1963 and advanced to the design stage, with funding split between the PDH and the U.S. Forest Service. The route north of Red Bridge would be built along a new alignment as the last highway relocation in the creation of the Kinzua Dam reservoir. Work on these projects was scheduled to begin in 1964. The new alignment of PA 321 north of Red Bridge was planned to parallel the original route to Morrison, where it would split and follow the North Fork Run to an intersection with the relocated alignment of PA 59. A new bridge carrying the route over Kinzua Creek near Red Bridge would be constructed. The new bridge would be higher than the original bridge to accommodate the higher water level of the reservoir.

Plans were made in 1964 to realign PA 321 to follow Hacker Street in Kane to access the Kinzua Road, avoiding the downtown area along US 6. On January 12, 1965, a meeting was held between Kane borough officials, local government and planning commission officials, and Funk and chief engineer Robert Keppner regarding the construction of PA 321, including improving the road between Wilcox and Kane, building a bypass to the east of Kane, and constructing the road north to PA 59. At this time, no plans existed to improve US 6/PA 321 on Fraley Street in Kane. In this meeting, it was announced construction on building the route north of Kane was planned to start before July 1, 1965, with work progressing from Red Bridge, where the highway was in the worst condition, south to Kane. The route would be built as a 20-foot (6.1 m) wide road with 8-foot (2.4 m) wide shoulders. Also, there was opposition to routing PA 321 along Clay Street in Kane and instead the state agreed to improve the existing alignment between the borough and the Elk County border, with one-way streets discussed as a possibility for the route through Kane. The Clay Street alignment would involve building new road and would lower the grade of the Baltimore and Ohio Railroad tracks; instead, a routing by way of Hacker Street was suggested which would not involve altering the railroad tracks, with a traffic light installed at the junction of US 6 and PA 321 to slow down traffic along US 6. There was also a proposal to have PA 321 bypass Kane to the east and intersect a relocated PA 68 south of Kane and a relocated US 6 east of the borough. On March 11, 1965, plans were unveiled by PDH secretary Henry Harral for constructing PA 321, with bidding expected to begin soon after. The new bridge over the Kinzua Creek at Red Bridge would be a continuous steel girder bridge with two concrete piers, 327 feet (100 m) long and 52 feet (16 m) high. A three-span bridge would be built over Chappel Forks. Work would take place on the route from 4 miles (6.4 km) north of Kane north to Red Bridge. Between the Elk County line and Kane, PA 321 would be improved along its existing alignment. At this time, the 4 miles (6.4 km) of the road to the north of Kane was still under design, with bidding planned for later in the year. Between Kane and Red Bridge, PA 321 would become a Forest Service Highway and would be built as a heavy-duty road.

On May 28, 1966, it was announced that the State Highways Commission would hold a meeting concerning road projects in the Clearfield District on June 1, asking for input from residents. Among the projects to be recommended by Representative Westerberg and other Kane officials were the improvement of US 6/PA 321 on Fraley Street in Kane along with completing the remaining segments of PA 321. At the meeting, Westerberg presented a need for improved highways in McKean County, including completing PA 321 in an expedited manner in order to provide access between Kane and Kinzua Lake. He called for work to begin on the 4 miles (6.4 km) to the north of Kane, as the existing 14-foot (4.3 m) road could not handle traffic heading to the lake. On July 20, 1966, Westerberg announced that a construction notice would be posted for the section between the Elk County line and Kane, with work to begin pending public hearings. Westerberg would also inquire about the status of the section between Red Bridge and PA 59.

On June 7, 1967, the state released its "5th and 6th Year Program", which called for Fraley Street in Kane to be widened and also listed for the sections of PA 321 between Wilcox and Kane and 4 miles (6.4 km) to the north of Kane to be reconstructed. The route was planned to be built as a 22-foot (6.7 m) road between Wilcox and the county line, a 24-foot (7.3 m) road between the county line and East Kane, and a 20-foot (6.1 m) road north of Kane. The slow progress of constructing PA 321 led to people in Kane feeling they were being neglected in not getting road access to Kinzua Dam.

In October 1967, it was announced by Secretary of Highways Robert G. Bartlett that a meeting would soon be held to speed up highway construction projects in the Kane area. Among the items called for was the replacement of the curbs on Fraley Street, which was projected to start in 1968. In addition, plans for constructing the route between Wilcox and Kane and along Hacker Street through Kane would be discussed. In December 1967, several recommendations were made to the Pennsylvania Highway Commission for the six-year program, including completing PA 321. At this time, final design was underway for PA 321 between Wilcox and 4 miles (6.4 km) north of Kane. Bids for improving Fraley Street in Kane were advertised in December. Also, a 5.9-mile (9.5 km) road known as Sugar Run Road was proposed to be built between Marshburg and the Kinzua Reservoir at a cost of $3,806,000, providing a connection for PA 321 north of PA 59.

On October 30, 1968, a meeting was held between the PDH and local officials. At this meeting, changes were made by the state to the PA 321 project at the southern end of Kane, with construction pushed back to 1969 and 1970. In addition, a design for an interchange with a possible US 6 bypass of Kane was revealed. The alignment of PA 321 between Wilcox and Kane was to be a reconstruction of the existing alignment with relocations in a few places. In Kane, the route would follow Hacker Street, which would be widened to 33 feet (10 m).

=== Kane to Red Bridge ===
The section of PA 321 between Kane and Kinzua was closed to through traffic in early 1963, though it started to see its heaviest traffic volumes ever. In early 1964, the U.S. Forest Service committed funds to the construction of PA 321 between Kane and Red Bridge. On June 19, 1964, Representative Victor Westerberg asked that the PDH give priority to three road projects in McKean County, including PA 321, to help improve access to the Kinzua Dam. As of this time, the section of the route from Kane to Red Bridge was waiting for action from the state for construction to begin.

On November 9, 1964, preliminary work on building PA 321 between Kane and Red Bridge was scheduled to get underway. This road would be reconstructed to eliminate or reduce several sharp curves. However, the notices for building the road did not include Easton and Chase streets in Kane, which carried two blocks of PA 321 to the north of US 6. The construction of PA 321 north of Kane was expected to block the town's access to the Kinzua Dam area and an alternate route via Forest Highway 262 was not anticipated to be completed in time, with traffic detoured via US 6 or US 219 to PA 59. In late November, a $285,000 bid was submitted to clear the valley of the Kinzua Creek for the reservoir. At this time, the state had $500,000 allocated for constructing PA 321 from Kane to Red Bridge, with construction scheduled to begin in July 1965. The section of PA 321 between Kane and Red Bridge was scheduled to have construction contracts issued in June 1965 with construction beginning on July 1. Surveys of PA 321 north of Kane were completed by March 1965.

By April 1965, work was underway in clearing the way for the reservoir that was to be formed by the Kinzua Dam. In July 1965, a $688,540 bid was submitted by Istock Construction Company to construct PA 321 from 4 miles (6.4 km) north of Kane to Red Bridge.

Construction on the first section of PA 321 between north of Kane and Red Bridge started on October 2, 1965, and was moving ahead of schedule. The section of PA 321 running 4 miles (6.4 km) north of Kane was unfunded, with the project scheduled for 1966. Work was scheduled to be completed on the section from 4 miles (6.4 km) north of Kane to Red Bridge in 1966, while the 4 miles (6.4 km) to the north of Kane was planned to be finished in 1967. With the construction projects underway, PA 321 was closed north of Kane and traffic was detoured via US 6 to Warren or via US 6 and US 219 to reach PA 59 and the Kinzua Dam.

In January 1966, work on the road south of Red Bridge was suspended for the winter. Construction of the road between north of Kane and Red Bridge was affected by mud. By May 1966, no action had been taken on the 4 miles (6.4 km) of PA 321 north of Kane along with the road between Red Bridge and PA 59, with no plans for access between Kane and the Kinzua Dam to be finished that year. It was confirmed that PA 321 between Kane and PA 59 would be a 20-foot (6.1 m) road with a 6-to-8-foot (1.8 to 2.4 m) berm, after an 18-foot (5.5 m) road was initially planned.

By June 1966, construction resumed on the section of PA 321 to the south of Red Bridge, though progress was slow. The section between 4 miles (6.4 km) north of Kane and Red Bridge was plagued by equipment and worker shortages. By October, final touches were being put in place on the section of the route south of Red Bridge, which were slated to be finished in spring 1967. The 4 miles (6.4 km) of the road north of Kane remained without funds and the section north to PA 59 had been approved by the USACE and was waiting for contract letting by the state, possibly not to be completed until 1968. The Kiasutha Recreational Area in the Allegheny National Forest was scheduled for a limited opening on June 1, 1967.

In August 1968, it was announced that contract letting for the 4 miles (6.4 km) of PA 321 to the north of Kane would begin in December. It was determined that most of this section of road would be relocated onto a new alignment mostly to the west. It was anticipated the existing road would remain open to traffic while the new alignment was built.

In April 1969, the PDH requested taking a portion of Glenwood Park for $2,020 to construct the route heading out of Kane. It was announced by state Senator Richard Frame and Representative Westerberg that the PA 321 project to the north of Kane was included in $6 million of capital fund projects introduced to the Pennsylvania State Senate by Frame on June 25; bids were scheduled for September 12.

The reconstruction of PA 321 north of Kane was shelved on November 7, 1969, due to lack of funds, but remained on the state Senate calendar. It was announced by Senator Frame and Representative Westerberg in March 1970 that bidding for the section of PA 321 north of Kane would begin on April 24. The Clearfield District held an information meeting on April 23, 1970, at which Representative Westerberg was in attendance. It was determined that the alignment of PA 321 on Hacker Street in Kane would be modified to extend the street northwest to the realigned PA 321 and pass to the west of the existing alignment in order to reduce the number of curves and avoid taking a portion of Glenwood Park. The low bidders to construct the section of PA 321 to the north of Kane were Putnam and Greene, Inc. for $1,768,997.11, with construction work projected to start in mid-May. During construction of the new alignment of the route, traffic traveling between Kane and the Kinzua Dam was expected to be detoured. In May 1970, the state began surveying the modified routing of PA 321 at the north end of Kane.

By October 1970, work was underway on the relocation of PA 321 immediately to the north of Kane. A 65-foot (20 m) cut was made to extend Hacker Street north, with the removed fill used to extend and level the athletic fields at Glenwood Park. Construction on this section was halted for the winter but was anticipated to resume in April 1971. The 4-mile (6.4 km) section of PA 321 north of Kane was partially opened to traffic by December 1971, with guardrail installation underway. This section was fully completed by the end of 1971. In 1972, a fault from a deep spring developed 2 miles (3.2 km) north of Kane, leading to that section of highway being replaced.

=== North of Red Bridge ===
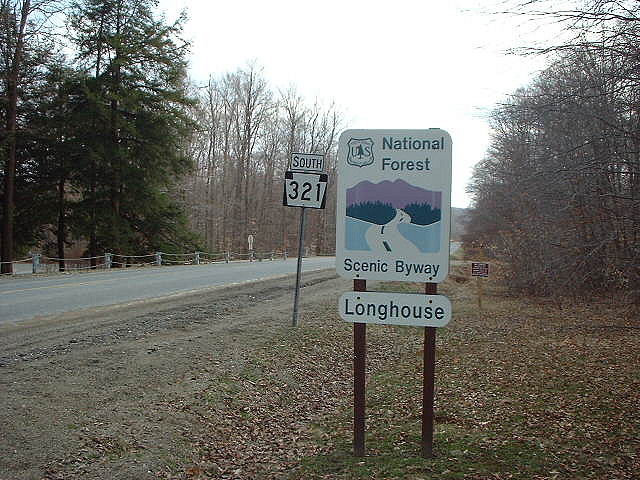
PA 321 southbound with sign for Longhouse National Scenic Byway

The USACE and the state were responsible for the section of the route between Red Bridge and PA 59, which included the bridge over Kinzua Creek. The state would build this section of road for the USACE. The bridge over the Kinzua Creek was advanced to the review stage by September 1964, and construction of the new road between Red Bridge and PA 59 was scheduled to be built starting in 1965. By November of that year, the bridge over the reservoir and the highway north to PA 59 were under review by the USACE.

By February 1965, the new bridge at Red Bridge had been engineered while plans for the section between Red Bridge and PA 59 were again under review by the USACE after being returned for some minor revisions.

By October 2, 1965, the first section between Red Bridge and PA 59, which involved the new bridge over Kinzua Creek, was under contract to O'Block Construction Company at a bid of $924,285, with construction starting the following week. On December 31, 1965, work began on building the concrete piers for the new bridge at Red Bridge. Progress continued on the Kinzua Creek bridge piers through the winter. Work on the bridge and its approach continued as weather permitted during the winter months. By the following month, the rock fill for the bridge approach was halfway complete while the path of the road leading to the bridge was being cut in order to be graded. The rock fill for the Kinzua Creek bridge was leveled with the piers by March 1966.

The same month, the section between Red Bridge and PA 59 was again placed for review for more revisions to be made while the 4 miles (6.4 km) to the north of Kane was surveyed but without funding. The bridge piers and rock fill were completed by May 1966. Construction of the Kinzua Creek bridge was affected by mud, though construction of the bridge remained on schedule.

In June 1966, right-of-way negotiations were underway between Red Bridge and PA 59. On June 3, 1966, pilings began to be driven for the bridge abutments at Kinzua Creek. By the following month, steel beams for the bridge over Kinzua Creek began to be put in place, with the bridge project ahead of schedule. In October 1966, the new bridge over the Kinzua Creek at Red Bridge along 2 miles (3.2 km) of road to the north of the bridge were completed and opened to traffic, with work on the berms remaining. In December 1966, the former bridge at Red Bridge was listed for demolition as part of clearing the basin for the lake.

On January 10, 1967, it was announced by Representative Westerberg that bidding for the relocation of PA 321 between Red Bridge and PA 59, which included the new Chappel Forks bridge, would open on February 10. The O'Block Construction Company submitted a low bid of $1,579,713, with completion expected later in the year. Construction was underway on building the relocated PA 321 between Red Bridge and PA 59 by June 1967. On June 2, clearing began to build the bridge at Chappel Forks. Construction equipment was shifted from the Forest Route 262 project to PA 321 as the forest road project was slowed for special tests. By the later part of the month, a lot of progress was made on building the road north of Red Bridge, although construction was slowed by rainy weather; the relocation was on target for a 1968 completion date. In addition to building the road, campsites and boat ramps would also be built adjacent to the road serving the lake. At Dunkle Corners, three boat ramps would be constructed where the former Kinzua Road crossed the lake and was submerged.

By October 1967, the section between Red Bridge and PA 59 was partially complete, but was impassable at several points and in need of a repave to handle heavy traffic. The steel needed to finish the Chappel Forks Bridge was delayed by a strike. The section between Red Bridge and PA 59 was ready to be paved starting in April. On June 5, the road was closed to traffic to allow paving to begin. By August of that year, the section between Red Bridge and PA 59 was paved while finishing touches on berms and guardrails were underway; the road remained closed to traffic and was planned to be opened in September. In addition, a connecting road between PA 59 in Marshburg through Willow Bay to the New York border was completed.

By late September, the project between Red Bridge and PA 59 was almost complete and would be opened to traffic following a formal inspection. On October 3, 1968, an inspection was scheduled with the USACE, USFS, PDH, and O'Block Construction Company officials touring the highway. This inspection revealed no issues with the road, and a final inspection was scheduled on October 8 before it would open. The section of PA 321 between Red Bridge and PA 59 opened to traffic on the afternoon of October 8, 1968, following a final inspection.

=== Kane ===
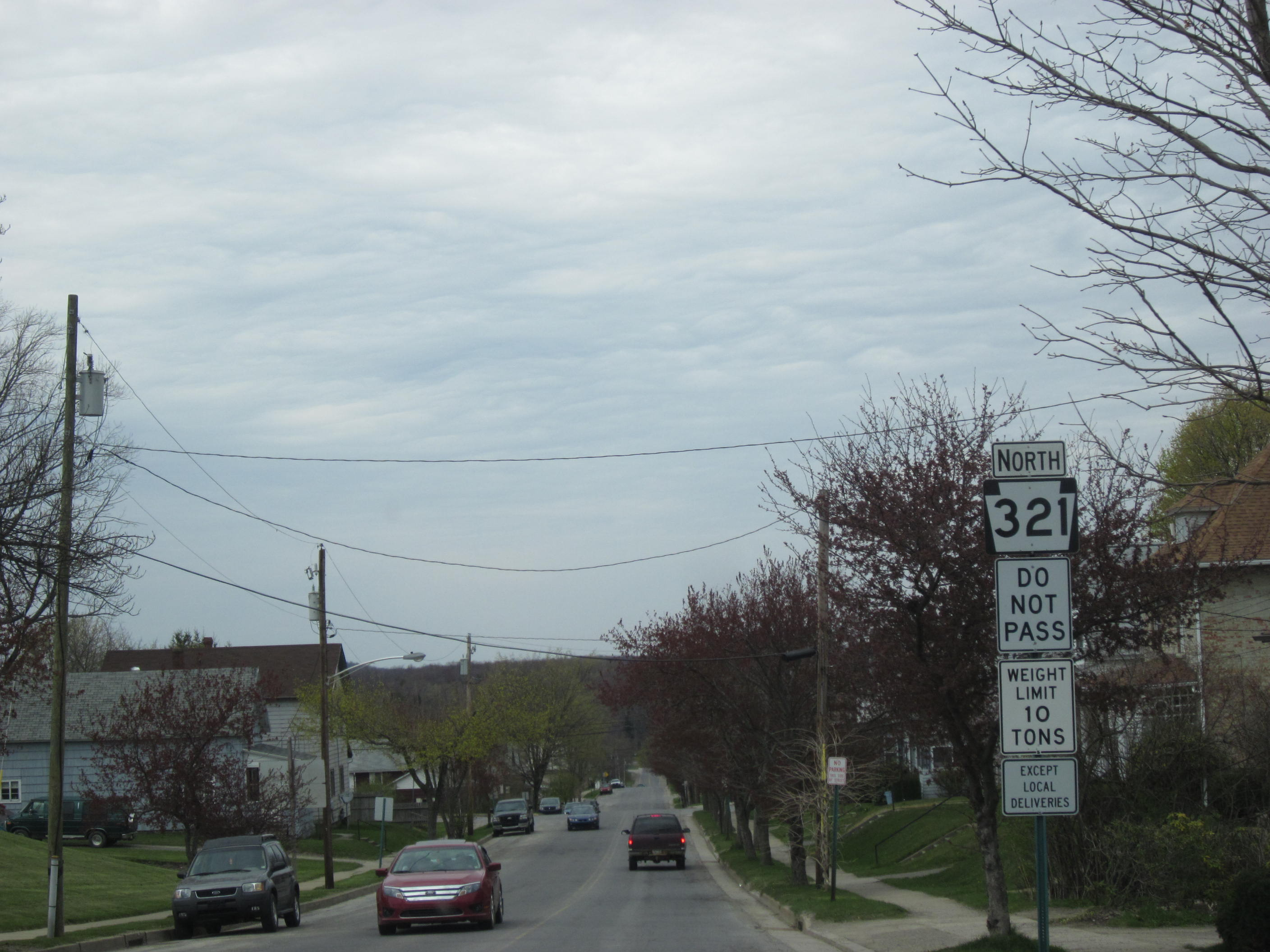
PA 321 northbound on Hacker Street in Kane

In October 1968, signs were installed on PA 321 at each end of Kane advising that the road would be improved from 1968 to 1969. On April 4, 1968, the borough of Kane made an offer with the state to give Hacker Street to the state for the alignment of PA 321 in exchange for parts of Easton Street, Chase Street, and Kinzua Avenue.

On February 3, 1969, it was revealed that several highway projects in the Kane area were stalled. The improvement of Fraley Street was halted due to the Kane Gas Company not having the money to replace its lines. In addition, the rebuilding of the 4-mile (6.4 km) stretch of PA 321 to the north of Kane was removed from the construction agenda for 1969. The construction of PA 321 south of Kane was still scheduled to begin later in the year, but the project was sent to the redesign stage for modifications to be made to the Baltimore and Ohio Railroad crossing to avoid grade changes. In November 1969, the borough of Kane and McKean County received plans from the Baltimore and Ohio Railroad for modifications to the railroad crossing along the route.

On December 31, 1969, it was announced that plans for the PA 321 project in Kane and East Kane would be on display to the public at Kane's borough hall on January 5, 1970. The first public hearing on the project was held the following day at the Central Fire Building in Kane to discuss the section of PA 321 through Kane and East Kane. Nearly 100 people, including PDH representatives, attended this hearing, where the state explained the project and the residents offered their opinions. At this hearing, it was mentioned that it was decided to route PA 321 through Kane rather than along an eastern bypass as the borough was intended to be a destination for motorists using the highway.

Construction on the Hacker Street section of PA 321 was scheduled to begin in summer 1970. The road was to have concrete travel lanes with asphalt shoulders. The proposed routing of PA 321 through Kane would cost $1,095,000 and would require acquiring one residential property. An alternate alignment was considered to provide a better intersection with US 6; however, it would have cost $1,123,000 and would have required taking two properties along with cutting off a railroad siding to a plant.

On March 2, 1970, the Kane borough council voted to consider withdrawing its offer to let the state use Hacker Street for the alignment of PA 321 as the state would require borough taxpayers to pay around $60,000 of the approximate $100,000 cost to relocate sewer, water, and gas lines. Several residents on Hacker Street were against the construction project. The Kane Borough Planning Commission discussed on July 6, 1970, the routing of PA 321 along Hacker Street. The state felt the street needed to be lowered more for a better construction base while the borough felt it needed to be lowered less in order to avoid relocating underground utilities. In addition, the residential property at US 6 and Hacker Street received a notice to be razed for construction of PA 321. On September 14, 1970, the borough of Kane was assured that it would receive 95 percent state aid for the $80,000 cost to lower the sanitary sewer on Hacker Street for construction of the route. The remaining $4,000 cost would come from McKean County from the Liquid Fuels Refund. At this time, there was no start date for construction along Hacker Street.

On February 25, 1971, it was announced that contract letting for the section of the route between Glenwood Park in Kane and East Kane, including Hacker Street, would take place on April 30. Residents in East Kane voiced opposition to reconstructing the route in their village in March 1971, and believed that the state found it more important to provide a route to Kane while taking a lot of land from people in East Kane to construct the highway. In late April, the opening of bids for the section of PA 321 through Kane was postponed due to approval needed from the Public Utilities Commission on changes made to the nearby Baltimore and Ohio Railroad siding.

On April 10, 1972, work continued along the section of PA 321 in Kane and East Kane, with full scale construction starting May 1 when ground conditions were more suitable. Work would first take place between East Kane and Kane and at the US 6 intersection, while construction along Hacker Street would follow. Hacker Street was intended to be the last part of PA 321 in Kane to be constructed to have the least impact on local residents. The same day, it was announced that bids would open on May 5 for concrete paving between Wilcox and East Kane. As full scale work began between East Kane and Kane on May 1, plans were accelerated for construction on the Hacker Street section of the route to begin by mid-May. During construction of Hacker Street, the street would be closed while US 6 and one cross street would remain open.

By July 1972, the road between East Kane and US 6 in Kane was being graded, with concrete pouring scheduled for August, while utility relocation was underway along Hacker Street. By September 1972, concrete was poured for the route between East Kane and Kane, and an overhead grade crossing signal was installed at the Baltimore and Ohio Railroad crossing to the south of Kane. The intersection with US 6 was nearly complete, with curb work to take place. Construction continued south from East Kane towards Wilcox, with several curves eliminated.

On August 6, 1973, asphalt paving began along Hacker Street in Kane, which was expected to take ten days to complete. Following that, sidewalks along the street would be improved. The following month, the borough of Kane received $10,000 from the liquid fuels tax to restore the sidewalks along Hacker Street. The street was anticipated to be opened following the completion of the sidewalk project by the borough and PennDOT. In October 1973, the section of PA 321 between East Kane and Kane and along Hacker Street in Kane was completed. An inspection of this segment by PennDOT, local officials, and E. M. Brown, Inc. officials was held prior to being opened to traffic after road signs along Hacker Street were installed. On November 4, 1974, PennDOT gave Kinzua Avenue to the borough of Kane in exchange to acquiring Hacker Street with the completion of the project along that street. On April 5, 1976, the Kane borough council voted to replace the incandescent street lights along Hacker Street with mercury vapor lights.

=== Wilcox to Kane ===
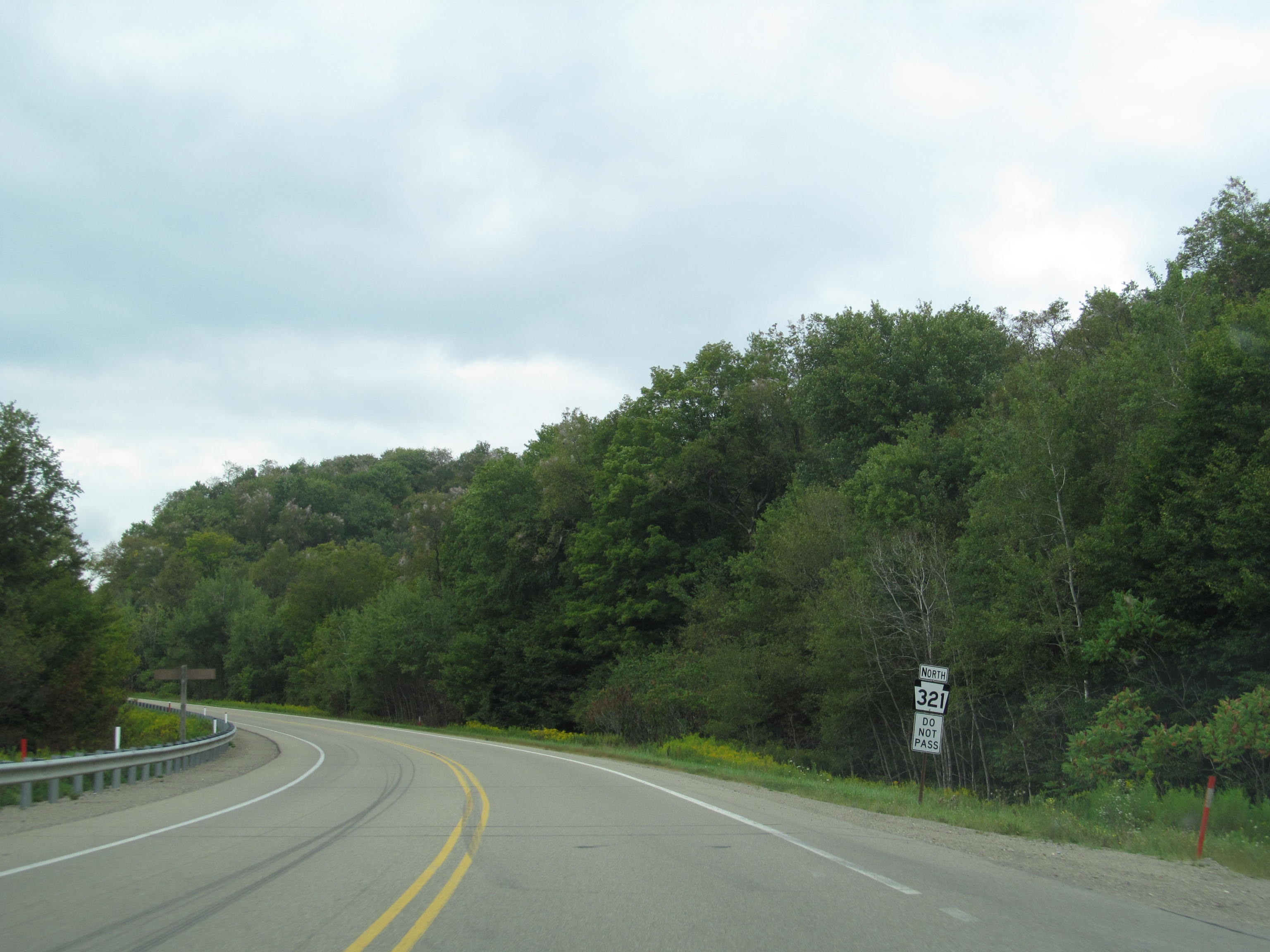
PA 321 northbound between Wilcox and Kane

In October 1965, the section of PA 321 between Wilcox and 4 miles (6.4 km) north of Kane was unfunded. In March 1966, it was announced by the Pennsylvania Department of Highways that construction would begin later in the year on the section of PA 321 between the Elk County border and the Baltimore and Ohio Railroad crossing between Kane and East Kane at a cost of $1.2 million. At this time, a decision was still needed for how the route would cross the railroad tracks into Kane, with surveys to be conducted. Also, there were no plans for PA 321 to bypass Kane. The section of the route between Wilcox and the county line was still under design. In addition, it was soon determined that the Baltimore and Ohio Railroad crossing in Kane would be lowered to build the highway. The project for PA 321 between Wilcox and Kane was taken "off the shelf" by the state in February 1967. By March 1968, the section of the route that would bypass Wilcox was listed at a cost of $550,000. Contracts were scheduled to be let for PA 321 south of Kane in 1968.

A public hearing took place January 27, 1970, at Kane Area Junior High School to discuss the section between Wilcox and East Kane. On February 25, 1971, it was announced that contracts were anticipated to be issued for the section between Wilcox and East Kane on June 25 but could possibly be pushed into July. By this time, property acquisition south of Kane was underway. The section of PA 321 between Wilcox and Kane had severely deteriorated at this point and was plagued with potholes. Bidding on the section of route between Wilcox and East Kane was scheduled to begin in the fall.

On June 25, 1971, E. M. Brown, Inc. was the low bidder at $1,652,027 to construct the section of PA 321 between Kane and East Kane; construction was scheduled to start 30 days later and the project was to be completed by spring 1973. Traffic would be detoured between Kane and Wilcox along US 6 and US 219 while construction took place. The state gave the "notice to proceed" for construction of the route in Kane and East Kane on September 30, 1971; construction was planned to begin on October 11.

PennDOT dropped plans to construct a bypass carrying PA 321 to the west of Wilcox on October 13, 1971, as it would have cut through Wilcox Baseball Park and a parcel of land owned by the Wilcox Area Industrial Development Corporation that was planned as a future industrial site. As a result, the improvement project for the route would be ended 1 mile (1.6 km) to the north of Wilcox. The project would use state and federal funds. The bypass issue was resolved on December 2, 1971, following community petitions for the bypass and a meeting with the Wilcox Area Industrial Development Corporation; bids were scheduled to be let on December 17. The state had reached an agreement with the Wilcox Area Industrial Development Corporation to use the land for the bypass and made an exchange with the baseball field for it to be built in a new location. This section of PA 321 was to be constructed as a 24-foot (7.3 m) road, with the US 219 intersection located 1,600 feet (490 m) south of the original intersection. The bidding for this section of PA 321 was pulled on December 17 and postponed to February or April 1972 because revisions were needed to account for transition in funding for the Wilcox bypass from the PDH to PennDOT, in which the state would do bonding and the projects would go through the legislature as bills and be signed by the Governor.

By July 1972, construction was underway on the segment of PA 321 between Wilcox and East Kane, with clearing of the right-of-way starting in East Kane and moving south. Completion of this segment was expected in 1974. During the middle part of 1972, construction was slowed by wet weather. Concrete paving for the route between Wilcox and East Kane was scheduled to begin by September 1, 1974, with the road possibly open to traffic in the fall. The paving of this section of road progressed from East Kane south to Wilcox in the course of a month. The concrete paving was completed in October 1974.

In June 1975, construction was slated to be completed between Wilcox and Kane. On June 12, 1975, it was announced a ribbon cutting ceremony for PA 321 between Wilcox and Kane would take place on July 2. The section of PA 321 between Wilcox and Kane was opened at a ceremony held at 11:30 am on July 2, 1975, at Kane Area Senior High School, with PennDOT secretary Jacob Kassab cutting the ribbon. A total of 200 people were in attendance for the ceremony, including Senator Frame, Congressman Johnson, Representative Westerberg, Kane Mayor Edgar James, and other local officials. The Kane Area Senior High School marching band performed at the ceremony. Following this, a luncheon was held at a restaurant near Kane with 70 persons in attendance.

== Major intersections ==
County	Location	mi	km	Destinations	Notes
Elk	Jones Township	0.000	0.000	US 219 (Buffalo Pittsburgh Highway) – Ridgway, Bradford	Southern terminus; village of Wilcox
McKean	Kane	8.979	14.450	US 6 east (Biddle Street) – Smethport	South end of US 6 concurrency
McKean	Kane	9.015	14.508	US 6 west (Biddle Street) to PA 66 – Warren	North end of US 6 concurrency
McKean	Corydon Township	27.901	44.902	PA 59 west – Warren	South end of PA 59 concurrency
McKean	Lafayette Township	29.933	48.172	PA 59 east – Smethport	North end of PA 59 concurrency
McKean	Corydon Township	43.829	70.536	PA 346 (Washington Street) – Bradford	Northern terminus
1.000 mi = 1.609 km; 1.000 km = 0.621 mi: Concurrency terminus
