= Sergeant, Pennsylvania =

Unincorporated community in Pennsylvania, US

- Unincorporated community
- Location within Pennsylvania
- Coordinates: 41°38′2″N 78°45′7″W
- Country: United States
- State: Pennsylvania
- County: McKean
- Township: Wetmore
- Elevation: 1,719 ft (524 m)
- Time zone: UTC-5 (Eastern (EST))
  - Summer (DST): UTC-4 (EDT)
- Area code: 814
- GNIS feature ID: 1209967

Sergeant is an unincorporated community in Wetmore Township in McKean County, Pennsylvania, United States. Sergeant is located along Pennsylvania Route 321, southeast of Kane.
