= Corsica, Pennsylvania =

Borough in Pennsylvania, US

- Borough
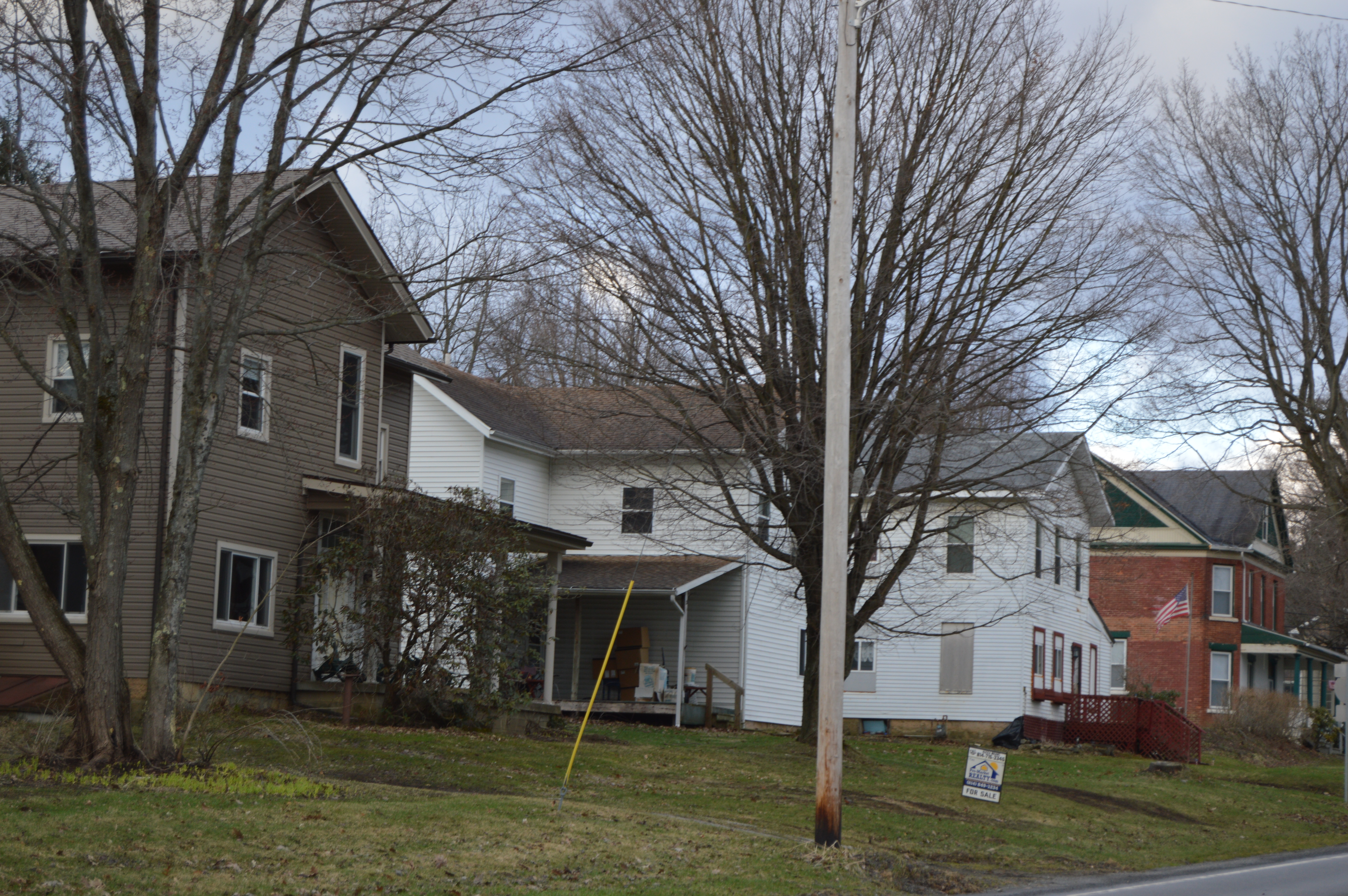
- Houses on Main Street

- Location of Corsica in Jefferson County, Pennsylvania.

- Location within Pennsylvania Location within the United States
- Coordinates: 41°10′52″N 79°12′08″W
- Country: United States
- State: Pennsylvania
- County: Jefferson
- Settled: 1802
- Incorporated: 1860

Government
  - Type: Borough Council
  - Mayor: David Leadbetter
  - President: Carol Cox
  - Vice President: Alan Bowley
  - Secretary: Tammy Laird

Area
  - Total: 0.45 sq mi (1.17 km^{2})
  - Land: 0.45 sq mi (1.17 km^{2})
  - Water: 0 sq mi (0.00 km^{2})
- Elevation: 1,613 ft (492 m)

Population (2020)
  - Total: 319
  - Density: 703.9/sq mi (271.77/km^{2})
- Time zone: UTC-5 (Eastern (EST))
  - Summer (DST): UTC-4 (EDT)
- ZIP code: 15829
- Area code: 814
- FIPS code: 42-16304
- Website: www.boroughofcorsica.com

Corsica is a borough in Jefferson County, Pennsylvania, United States. As of the 2020 census, Corsica had a population of 319. It was named for the island of Corsica, birthplace of Napoleon Bonaparte. The mayor of the borough is Dave Leadbetter.

== History ==
Corsica suffered a devastating fire in 1873, which destroyed most of the town's businesses and residences.

== Geography ==
Corsica is located in western Jefferson County. Its western border is the Clarion County line.

U.S. Route 322 passes through the center of town as Main Street, and leads east 6 miles (10 km) to Brookville, the Jefferson county seat, and west 10 miles (16 km) to Clarion. Interstate 80 passes just north of the borough limits, with access from Exit 73 (Pennsylvania Route 949). I-80 leads east 27 miles (43 km) to DuBois and west 54 miles (87 km) to Interstate 79 near Mercer. PA 949 leads northeast 8 miles (13 km) to Sigel and south 5 miles (8 km) to Summerville.

According to the United States Census Bureau, the borough of Corsica has a total area of 0.40 square miles (1.04 km^{2}), all land.

== Demographics ==
Historical population
Census	Pop.	Note	%±
1860	249		—
1870	372		49.4%
1880	391		5.1%
1890	338		−13.6%
1900	293		−13.3%
1910	301		2.7%
1920	358		18.9%
1930	391		9.2%
1940	481		23.0%
1950	421		−12.5%
1960	431		2.4%
1970	374		−13.2%
1980	381		1.9%
1990	337		−11.5%
2000	354		5.0%
2010	357		0.8%
2020	319		−10.6%

As of the census of 2000, there were 354 people, 145 households, and 94 families residing in the borough. The population density was 758.9 inhabitants per square mile (293.0/km^{2}). There were 157 housing units at an average density of 336.6 per square mile (130.0/km^{2}). The racial makeup of the borough was 98.59% White, 0.85% Asian, and 0.56% from two or more races.

There were 145 households, out of which 30.3% had children under the age of 18 living with them, 55.2% were married couples living together, 4.8% had a female householder with no husband present, and 34.5% were non-families. 30.3% of all households were made up of individuals, and 11.7% had someone living alone who was 65 years of age or older. The average household size was 2.44 and the average family size was 3.08.

In the borough the population was spread out, with 26.6% under the age of 18, 11.0% from 18 to 24, 28.0% from 25 to 44, 20.3% from 45 to 64, and 14.1% who were 65 years of age or older. The median age was 34 years. For every 100 females there were 114.5 males. For every 100 females age 18 and over, there were 101.6 males.

The median income for a household in the borough was $30,625, and the median income for a family was $38,438. Males had a median income of $27,813 versus $18,125 for females. The per capita income for the borough was $13,752. About 7.1% of families and 11.0% of the population were below the poverty line, including 8.2% of those under age 18 and 17.8% of those age 65 or over.

== Education ==
The Clarion-Limestone Area School District provides kindergarten through 12th grade public education for the community. Clarion-Limestone Area School District operates two schools, Clarion-Limestone Jr/Sr High School (7th-12th) and Clarion-Limestone Elementary School (K-6th).

== Infrastructure ==
The borough is home to the Corsica Volunteer Fire Department.
