= Hamilton Township, Pennsylvania =

Hamilton Township is the name of some places in the U.S. state of Pennsylvania:

- Hamilton Township, Adams County, Pennsylvania
- Hamilton Township, Franklin County, Pennsylvania
- Hamilton Township, McKean County, Pennsylvania
- Hamilton Township, Monroe County, Pennsylvania
- Hamilton Township, Tioga County, Pennsylvania
