= Russell City =

Russell City may refer to:

- Russell City, California
- Russell City, Pennsylvania
