= Pig's ear =

Pig's ear may refer to:

- Pig's ear (food)
- Pig's ear (pastry)
- Pigs Ear, Pennsylvania
- Cotyledon orbiculata, a flowering succulent plant
- Gomphus clavatus, an edible species of fungus
- Discina perlata, a species of fungus
