= Pennsylvania Route 949 =

State highway in Pennsylvania, US

Pennsylvania Route 949

Route information
- Maintained by PennDOT
- Length: 44.985 mi (72.396 km)

Major junctions
- South end: PA 28 in Summerville
- US 322 in Corsica; I-80 near Corsica
- North end: PA 948 in Ridgway

Location
- Country: United States
- State: Pennsylvania
- Counties: Jefferson, Elk

Highway system
- Pennsylvania State Route System; Interstate; US; State; Scenic; Legislative
← PA 948	→ PA 950

Pennsylvania Route 949 (PA 949) is a 45-mile-long (72 km), north–south state highway located in Jefferson and Elk counties in Pennsylvania. The southern terminus is at PA 28 in Summerville. The northern terminus is at PA 948 in Ridgway.

== Route description ==
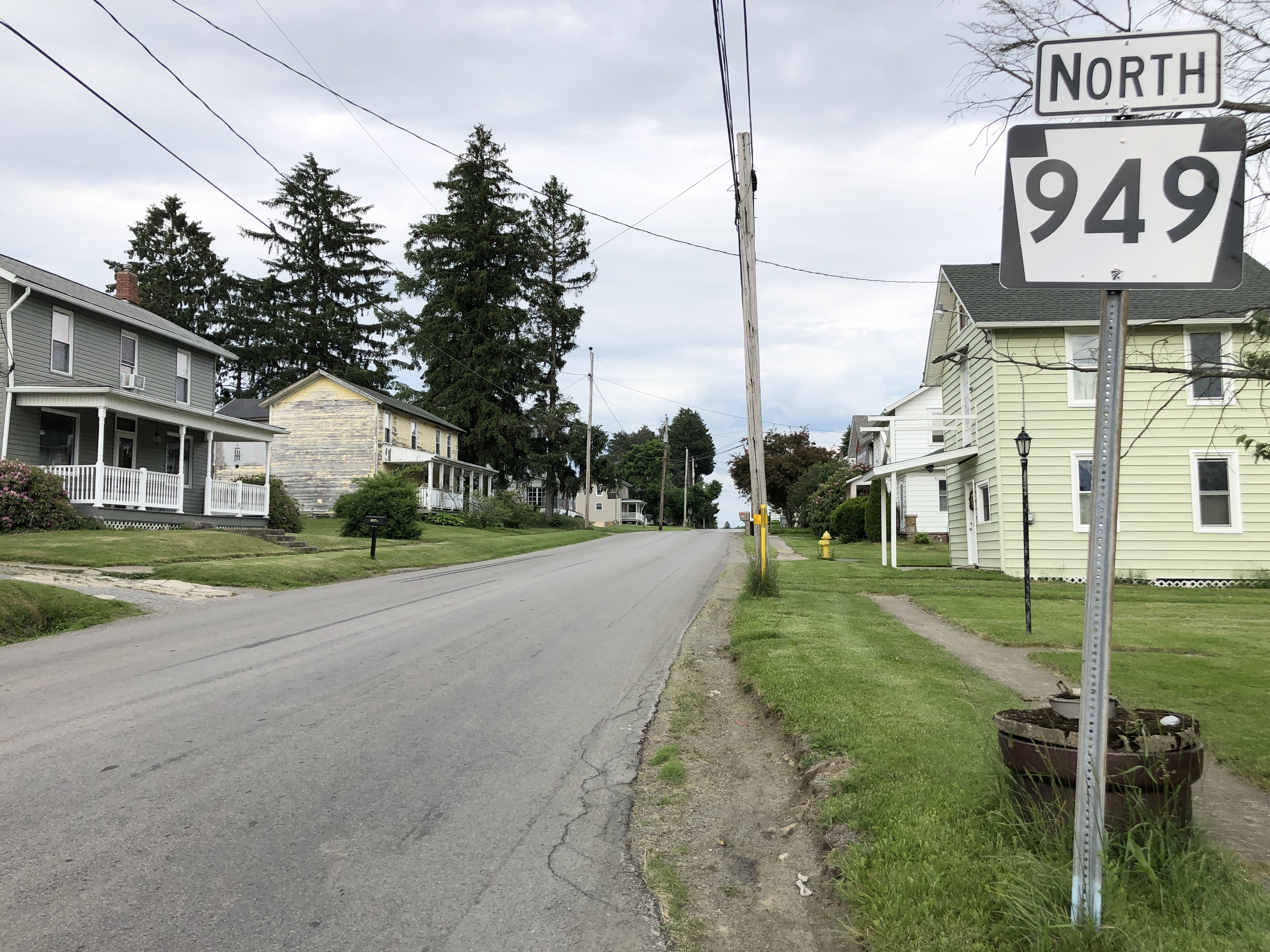
PA 949 northbound in Sigel

PA 949 begins in the borough of Summerville at the intersection of PA 28. The route goes north to US 322, where a small concurrency occurs in the borough of Corsica. Outside of Corsica, there is an interchange with I-80 (Exit 73). The route continues north to the village of Sigel, where there is an intersection with PA 36. The route then makes a northeast turn to the Clarion River, where it parallels the river going east for a short distance, then turns away from the river at the Clear Creek State Forest and Heath Pump Station, where it continues east. The intersection with the former PA 968 is in the State Forest.

PA 949 goes on a northeast course before paralleling the Clarion River again for the rest of the route into the borough of Ridgway. It enters the town from the southwest, and terminates in the center of the borough, at an intersection with PA 948.

== History ==
The route was signed in 1928. In the 1930s, the route was fully completed as was intended. The route has stayed on the same route for most of its existence, however, it was recently extended from its former southern terminus in Corsica, to its current terminus in Summerville.

== Major intersections ==
County	Location	mi	km	Destinations	Notes
Jefferson	Summerville	0.000	0.000	PA 28	Southern terminus
Jefferson	Corsica	4.232	6.811	US 322 east – Brookville	South end of US 322 overlap
Jefferson	Corsica	4.568	7.351	US 322 west (Main Street) – Clarion	North end of US 322 overlap
Jefferson	Union Township	4.966– 5.085	7.992– 8.184	I-80 – Dubois, Clarion	Exit 73 on I-80
Jefferson	Eldred Township	13.056	21.012	PA 36 – Leeper, Brookville	
Elk	Ridgway	44.985	72.396	PA 948 (Main Street)	Northern terminus
1.000 mi = 1.609 km; 1.000 km = 0.621 mi: Concurrency terminus
