= Philip Aines =

American football and basketball coach (1899–1973)

Biographical details
- Born: April 30, 1899; Middlebury, Vermont, U.S.
- Died: December 28, 1973 (aged 74); Mount Dora, Florida, U.S.
- Education: Middlebury

Coaching career (HC unless noted)

Football
- 1922: Kane HS (PA)
- 1923–1924: Millersville
- 1925–1926: Juniata

Basketball
- 1923–1925: Millersville
- 1925–1927: Juniata

Head coaching record
- Overall: 39–28 (college basketball)

Philip D. Aines (April 30, 1899 – December 28, 1973) was an American football and basketball coach. He was a graduate of Middlebury College in Vermont and began his career as a coach at Kane High School in McKean County, Pennsylvania. He served as the head basketball coach at Millersville University of Pennsylvania from 1923 to 1925 and at Juniata College from 1925 to 1927.
