= Dunkle Corners, Pennsylvania =

Unincorporated community in Pennsylvania, US

- Unincorporated community
- Location within Pennsylvania
- Coordinates: 41°47′43″N 78°54′42″W
- Country: United States
- State: Pennsylvania
- County: McKean
- Township: Hamilton
- Elevation: 1,352 ft (412 m)
- Time zone: UTC-5 (Eastern (EST))
  - Summer (DST): UTC-4 (EDT)
- Area code: 814
- GNIS feature ID: 1210359

Dunkle Corners is an unincorporated community in Hamilton Township in McKean County, Pennsylvania, United States. Dunkle Corners is located along Pennsylvania Route 321, on the shore of the Allegheny Reservoir to the north of Kane.
