= Ludlow, Pennsylvania =

Unincorporated community in Pennsylvania, US

- Unincorporated community
- Location within Pennsylvania Location within the United States
- Coordinates: 41°43′42″N 78°56′36″W
- Country: United States
- State: Pennsylvania
- County: McKean
- Township: Hamilton
- Elevation: 1,572 ft (479 m)
- Time zone: UTC-5 (Eastern (EST))
  - Summer (DST): UTC-4 (EDT)
- GNIS feature ID: 1210188

Ludlow is an unincorporated community in western McKean County, Pennsylvania, United States. It is situated at 41°43´N, 78°56´W, within the Allegheny National Forest. U.S. Route 6 passes through the community.

Ludlow is home to the historic Olmsted Manor, as well as Wildcat Park.
