= McKinley, Elk County, Pennsylvania =

Unincorporated community in Pennsylvania, US

McKinley, Pennsylvania
- Unincorporated community
- Location within Pennsylvania
- Coordinates: 41°36′12″N 78°51′18″W
- Country: United States
- State: Pennsylvania
- County: Elk
- Elevation: 1,713 ft (522 m)
- Time zone: UTC-5 (Eastern (EST))
  - Summer (DST): UTC-4 (EDT)
- Area code: 814
- GNIS feature ID: 1209808

McKinley is an unincorporated community in Highland Township, Elk County, Pennsylvania, United States.
