= Pennsylvania Route 948 =

State highway in Pennsylvania, US

Pennsylvania Route 948

Route information
- Maintained by PennDOT
- Length: 38.558 mi (62.053 km)

Major junctions
- South end: PA 255 in Fox Township
- US 219 from Ridgway Township to Ridgway; PA 120 in Ridgway; PA 949 in Ridgway; PA 66 in Highland Township
- North end: PA 666 near Sheffield Township

Location
- Country: United States
- State: Pennsylvania
- Counties: Elk, Forest, Warren

Highway system
- Pennsylvania State Route System; Interstate; US; State; Scenic; Legislative
← PA 946	→ PA 949

Pennsylvania Route 948 (PA 948) is a 38.5-mile-long (62.0 km) state highway located in Elk, Forest, and Warren counties in Pennsylvania. The southern terminus is at PA 255 in Fox Township. The northern terminus is at PA 666 near Sheffield Township.

== Route description ==
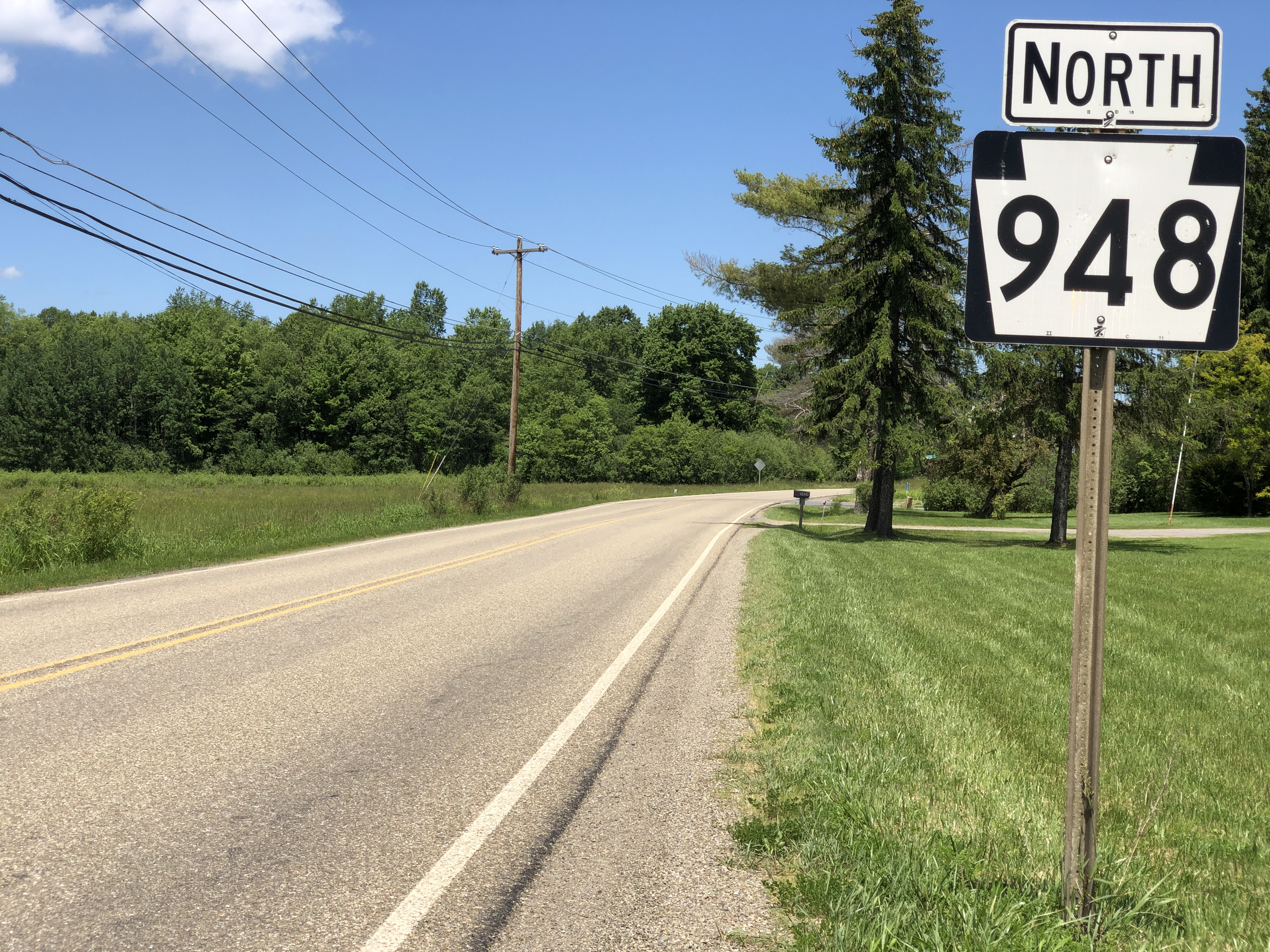
PA 948 northbound in Ridgway Township

PA 948 begins at an intersection with PA 255 in Fox Township, Elk County, heading southwest on two-lane undivided Fairview Road. The road passes through rural residential areas, curving west into a mix of farmland, woodland, and homes. The route becomes Main Street and runs through the community of Kersey, where it passes residences and a few businesses. PA 948 becomes West Main Street Extended and heads west-northwest into wooded areas with some fields and development, becoming Shelvey Summit Road and passing through Shelvey. The road heads west between agricultural areas to the north and woodland to the south before heading into more wooded areas with some homes, curving northwest. The route heads into Ridgway Township and becomes Kersey Road, heading between woods to the northeast and farmland to the southwest with some development. PA 948 comes to an intersection with U.S. Route 219 (US 219) in Boot Jack and continues north-northwest concurrent with that route on Boot Jack Road.

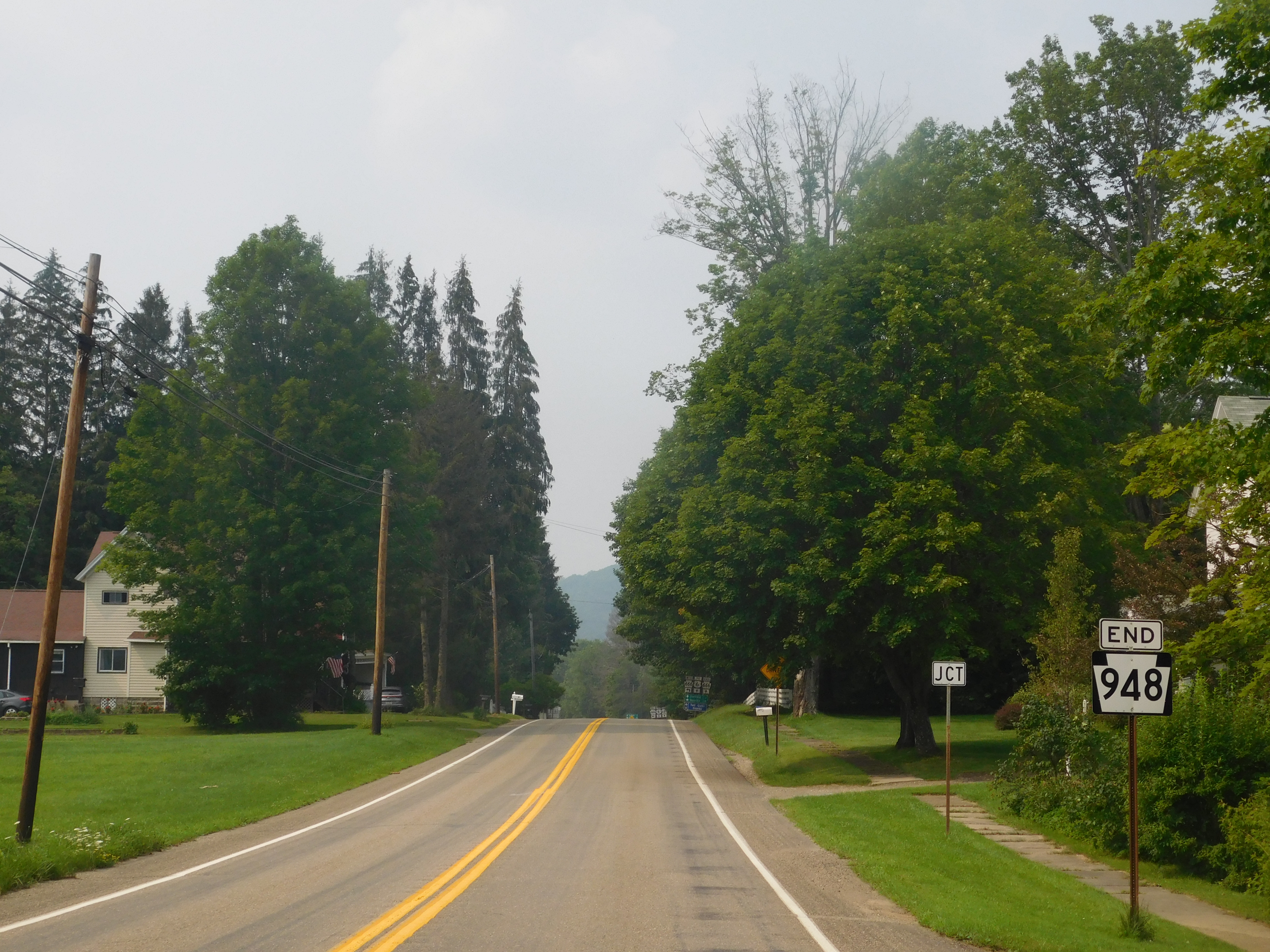
PA 948 approaching PA 666 in Sheffield

The road heads through forested areas with a few homes, turning northwest and heading into agricultural areas with some residences and businesses. US 219/PA 948 comes to the southern terminus of US 219 Truck, which heads north on a one-way ramp to bypass a steep portion of US 219/PA 948. From here, the two routes wind northwest and descend a forested hill with one northbound lane and two southbound lanes, entering the borough of Ridgway. The road turns west and becomes East Main Street, heading into residential areas and intersecting the western terminus of PA 120 at which point US 219 Truck also rejoins the road. The two routes head west-southwest into the commercial downtown on Main Street, with US 219 splitting from PA 948 by heading north on North Broad Street. A short distance later, PA 948 intersects the northern terminus of PA 949. The road turns west and crosses the Clarion River, becoming West Main Street and passing more homes and businesses. The route turns north onto Montmorenci Avenue, crossing the Buffalo and Pittsburgh Railroad's B&P Main Line Subdivision line and continues through residential areas, heading north-northwest. PA 948 heads back into Ridgway Township and becomes Montmorenci Road, running through farmland and woodland with some homes. The road heads north through more rural areas, turning northwest at Montmorenci. The route heads into dense forests, crossing into Jones Township and becoming Highland Road. PA 948 curves more to the west-northwest and enters the Allegheny National Forest before heading into Highland Township and becoming an unnamed road. The road continues through more forests with some fields and homes, passing through Highland. The route comes to an intersection with PA 66 and the two routes continue west through more of the Allegheny National Forest. The road curves west-northwest and passes through Russell City before PA 66 splits to the west at Chaffee. Past this, the road continues through more forest.

PA 948 enters Howe Township in Forest County and passes through more of the Allegheny National Forest before leaving the national forest boundaries and passing through the community of Brookston in a forested area. The road crosses into Sheffield Township in Warren County and heads back into the Allegheny National Forest, running to the west of the South Branch Tionesta Creek and heading north-northwest through Cherry Run and Martin. The route heads through more of the forest and crosses the creek, heading northwest into wooded areas of homes as it passes through Hoovers. PA 948 turns north and comes to its northern terminus at PA 666, where the road continues north as part of that route.

== Major intersections ==
County	Location	mi	km	Destinations	Notes
Elk	Fox Township	0.000	0.000	PA 255 (Million Dollar Highway) – St. Marys, Weedville, DuBois	Southern terminus
Elk	Ridgway Township	7.463	12.011	US 219 south (Boot Jack Road) – Brockway	South end of US 219 overlap
Elk	Ridgway Township	9.987	16.073	US 219 Truck north	One-way ramp
Elk	Ridgway	11.232	18.076	PA 120 east (Depot Street) – Emporium	Western terminus of PA 120
Elk	Ridgway	11.373	18.303	US 219 north (Broad Street) – Bradford	North end of US 219 overlap
Elk	Ridgway	11.472	18.462	PA 949 south (South Mill Avenue)	Northern terminus of PA 949
Elk	Highland Township	27.148	43.690	PA 66 north (Kane-Russell City Road) – Kane	South end of PA 66 overlap
Elk	Highland Township	30.043	48.350	PA 66 south – Clarion	North end of PA 66 overlap
Forest	No major junctions				
Warren	Sheffield Township	38.558	62.053	PA 666 to US 6 – Sheffield, Tionesta	Northern terminus
1.000 mi = 1.609 km; 1.000 km = 0.621 mi: Concurrency terminus
