= Clarion-Limestone Jr/Sr High School =

School in Strattanville, Pennsylvania, US

Coordinates: 41.18362°N 79.27620°W

Clarion-Limestone Jr./Sr. High School

Location
- 4091 C-L School Rd. Strattanville, Pennsylvania 16258

Information
- School type: Public Junior/Senior High School
- Founded: 1936
- School district: Clarion-Limestone Area
- Superintendent: J.J. Johnson
- Principal: Mike Stimac
- Faculty: 40
- Grades: 7th – 12th
- Enrollment: 363 (2023-2024)
  - Grade 7: 62
  - Grade 8: 67
  - Grade 9: 65
  - Grade 10: 46
  - Grade 11: 64
  - Grade 12: 59
- Colors: Navy Blue and Vegas Gold
- Athletics conference: PIAA District IX / KSAC
- Mascot: Lion
- Publication: Paw Print
- Communities served: Corsica, Strattanville
- Feeder schools: Clarion-Limestone Area Elementary School

Clarion-Limestone Jr/Sr High School is a public Junior/Senior High School, in Strattanville, central Clarion County, Pennsylvania, with 522 students in grades 7-12

== Graduation requirements ==
A student from C-L needs to obtain 24 credits in Grades 9–12, and satisfactorily complete their Graduation Projecet, as well as the PSSA's in order to graduate.

=== Credit structure ===
Subject Area	#/Credits
English	4.0
Mathematics	3.0
Social Studies	3.0
Science	3.0
Arts / Humanities	2.0
Physical Education / Health	1.0
Special Interest Electives	8.0
TOTAL	24.0

=== Courses available ===
According to the curriculum guide, there are nearly 100 courses available to the student at C-L.

- English
- Mathematics
- Science
- Social Studies
- Foreign Language - Including French and Spanish
- Business Technology - Including Multimedia and Webpage
- Family and Consumer Sciences
- Industrial Arts - Including Ag Mechanics, Metal Shop, Woodshop, and Drafting
- Art
- Music
- Physical Education - All students, grades 7-12, take PE every school day for one quarter of each school year.
- Driver's Education

== Athletics ==
Clarion-Limestone participates in District IX (9) of the Pennsylvania Interscholastic Athletic Association, or PIAA

Sport Name	Boys	Girls
Baseball / Softball	Class A	Class A
Basketball	Class A	Class A
Cross country	Class AA	Class AA
Football	Class A	
Golf	Class AA	
Soccer	Class A	
Track and Field	Class AA	Class A
Volleyball		Class A

== Clubs and activities ==
C-L offers the following clubs and activities

- Academic Sports League
- Art Club
- Band
- Bible Club
- Drama Club
- Envirothon
- French Club
- FFA
- Future Teachers of America
- Green Imprints
- Junior Historians
- National Honor Society
- Spanish Club
- Student Council
- Webpage
- Yearbook
