= Clarion-Limestone Area School District =

School district in Pennsylvania

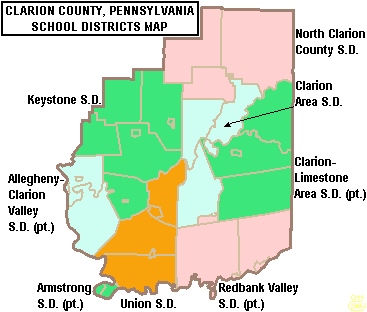

Address
- 4091 C-L School Road Strattanville, Pennsylvania, 16258; United States

District information
- Type: Public

Students and staff
- District mascot: Lions

Other information
- Website: clasd.net

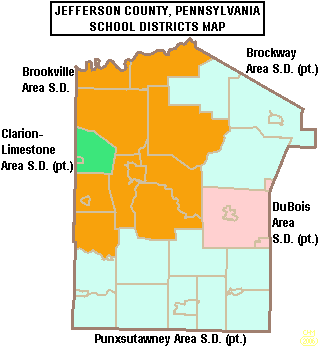
Clarion-Limestone Area School District region in Jefferson County

The Clarion-Limestone Area School District is a small, rural, public school district which spans portions of two counties. In Clarion County, it serves the Borough of Strattanville and Clarion Township, Limestone Township and Millcreek Township. In Jefferson County it serves the Borough of Corsica and Union Township. The Clarion-Limestone Area School District encompasses approximately 117 square miles (300 km^{2}). According to 2000 federal census data, it serves a resident population of 7,173. In 2009, the District residents' per capita income was $17,013, while median family income was $38,633 per year.

Clarion-Limestone Area School District operates two schools; Clarion-Limestone Jr/Sr High School (7th–12th) and Clarion-Limestone Elementary School (K–6th).
