= Eldred Township, Jefferson County, Pennsylvania =

Township in Pennsylvania, US

Coordinates: 41°16′00″N 79°04′59″W

- Township
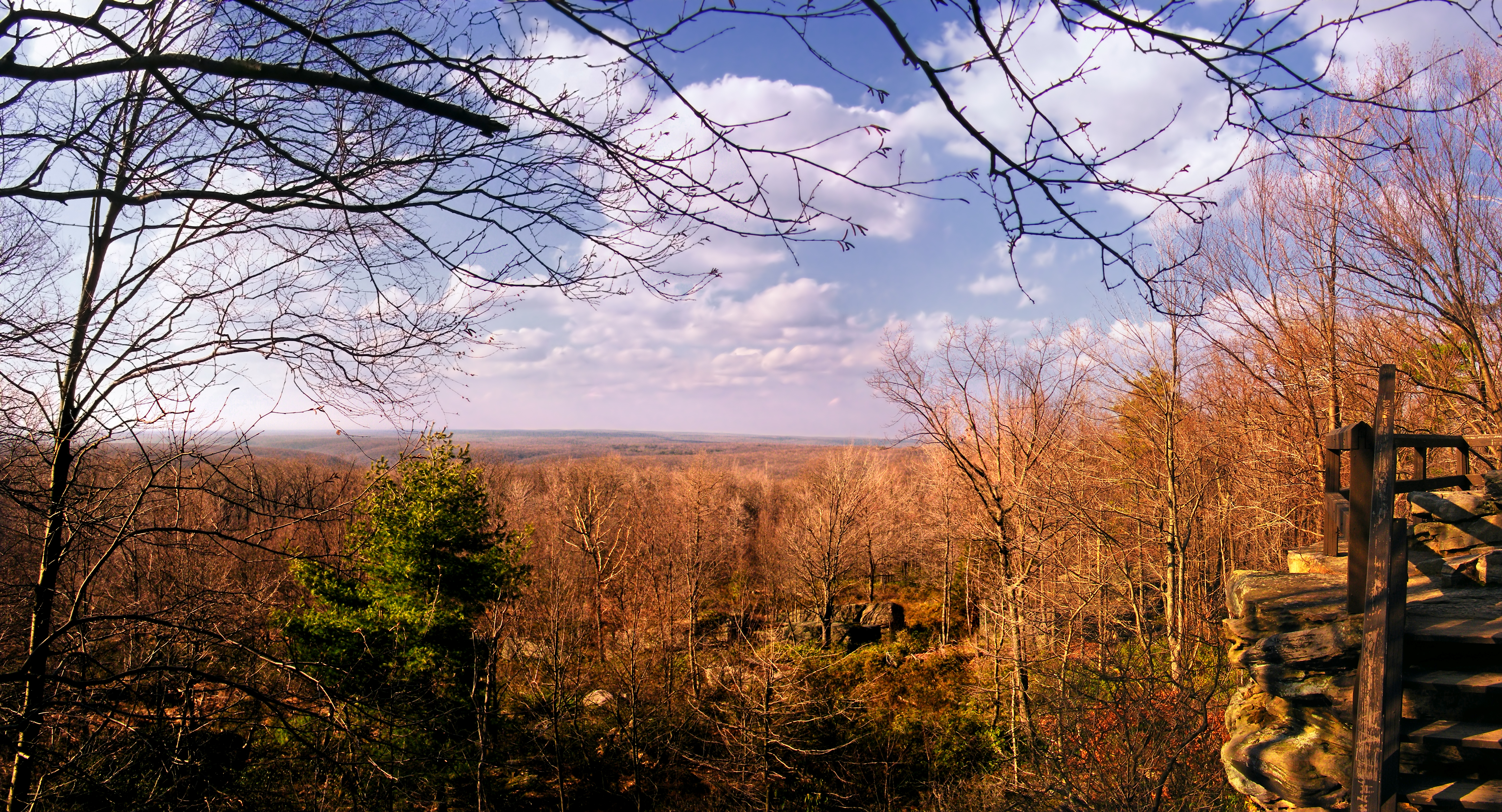
- Clear Creek State Forest

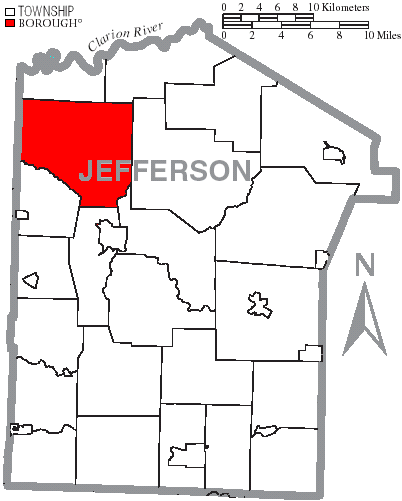
- Map of Jefferson County, Pennsylvania Highlighting Eldred Township

- Map of Jefferson County, Pennsylvania
- Country: United States
- State: Pennsylvania
- County: Jefferson
- Settled: 1828
- Incorporated: 1836

Area
  - Total: 46.58 sq mi (120.64 km^{2})
  - Land: 46.53 sq mi (120.51 km^{2})
  - Water: 0.050 sq mi (0.13 km^{2})

Population (2020)
  - Total: 1,275 ▲
  - Estimate (2023): 1,251
  - Density: 25.7/sq mi (9.91/km^{2})
- Time zone: UTC-5 (Eastern (EST))
  - Summer (DST): UTC-4 (EDT)
- FIPS code: 42-065-22872
- Website: www.eldredtownshipjeffersoncounty.com

Eldred Township is a township in Jefferson County, Pennsylvania, United States. The population was 1,275 at the 2020 census. It was named for Nathaniel B. Eldred, President Judge of the judicial district of which Jefferson County was a part.

== Geography ==
Eldred Township is in northwestern Jefferson County and is bordered to the west by Clarion County. According to the United States Census Bureau, the township has a total area of 46.6 square miles (120.6 km^{2}), of which 0.04 square miles (0.1 km^{2}), or 0.11%, are water. The North Fork of Redbank Creek forms the southeast border of the township, and Mill Creek, a west-flowing tributary of the Clarion River, forms most of the southern boundary. The entire township is in the Allegheny River watershed.

Unincorporated villages in the township include Sigel, Howe, and Kahletown.

== Demographics ==
Historical population
Census	Pop.	Note	%±
1850	492		—
1860	826		67.9%
1870	832		0.7%
1880	1,271		52.8%
1890	1,581		24.4%
1900	1,535		−2.9%
1910	1,399		−8.9%
1920	1,091		−22.0%
1930	998		−8.5%
1940	1,205		20.7%
1950	1,070		−11.2%
1960	1,031		−3.6%
1970	1,056		2.4%
1980	1,111		5.2%
1990	1,197		7.7%
2000	1,277		6.7%
2010	1,226		−4.0%
2020	1,275		4.0%
2023 (est.)	1,251		−1.9%
U.S. Decennial Census

As of the census of 2000, there were 1,277 people, 501 households, and 381 families residing in the township. The population density was 27.4 inhabitants per square mile (10.6/km^{2}). There were 873 housing units at an average density of 18.7/sq mi (7.2/km^{2}). The racial makeup of the township was 99.37% White, 0.16% Native American, 0.08% Asian, and 0.39% from two or more races. Hispanic or Latino of any race were 0.16% of the population.

There were 501 households, out of which 30.3% had children under the age of 18 living with them, 66.1% were married couples living together, 7.2% had a female householder with no husband present, and 23.8% were non-families. 19.4% of all households were made up of individuals, and 10.4% had someone living alone who was 65 years of age or older. The average household size was 2.55 and the average family size was 2.94.

In the township the population was spread out, with 22.8% under the age of 18, 6.3% from 18 to 24, 30.1% from 25 to 44, 24.4% from 45 to 64, and 16.4% who were 65 years of age or older. The median age was 40 years. For every 100 females, there were 105.3 males. For every 100 females age 18 and over, there were 101.6 males.

The median income for a household in the township was $36,205, and the median income for a family was $38,945. Males had a median income of $30,809 versus $21,976 for females. The per capita income for the township was $17,596. About 5.7% of families and 8.1% of the population were below the poverty line, including 5.9% of those under age 18 and 6.2% of those age 65 or over.
