= Highland Township, Elk County, Pennsylvania =

Township in Pennsylvania, United States

Coordinates: 41°35′00″N 78°49′59″W

- Township
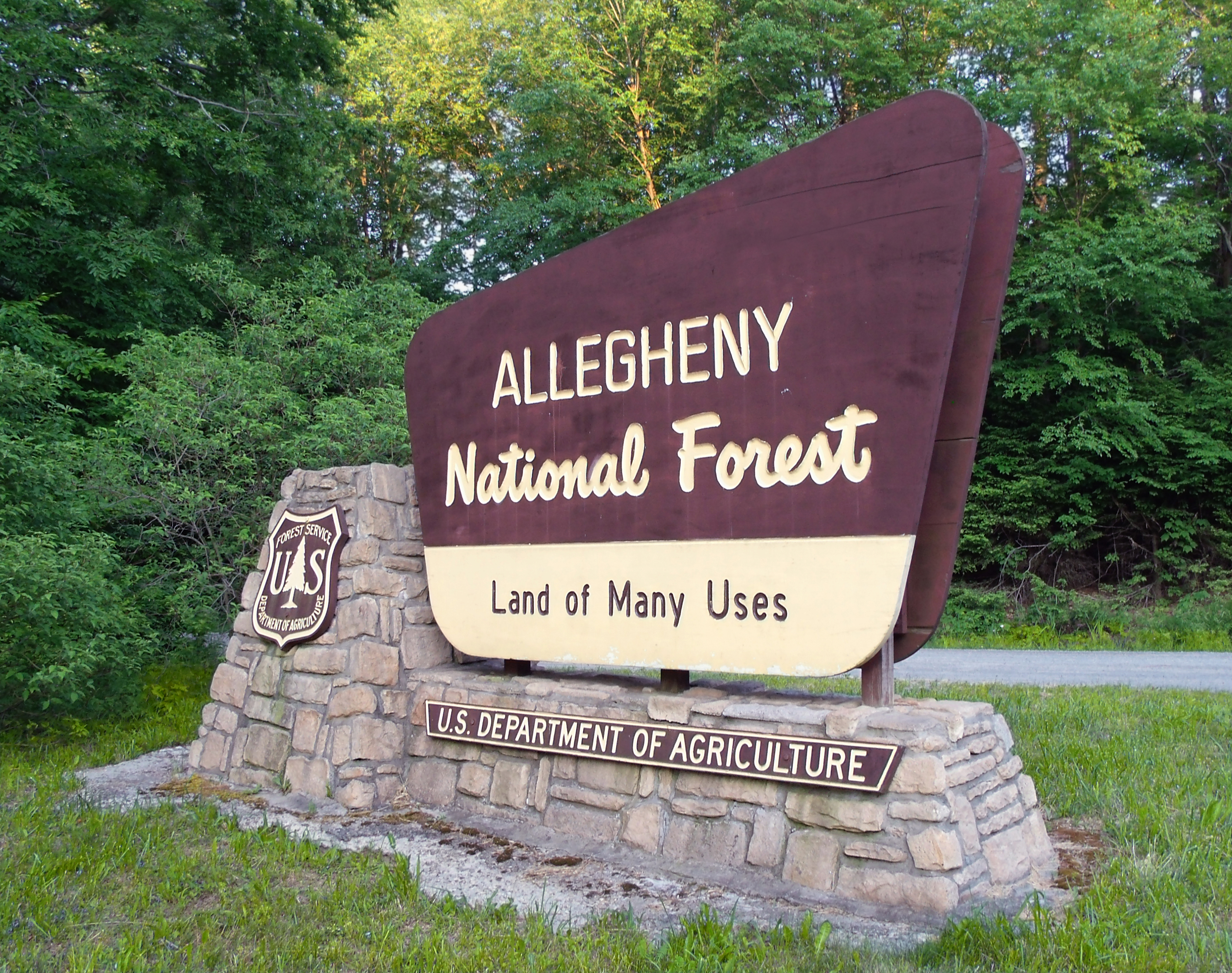
- A welcome sign for Allegheny National Forest along Route 948

- Location in Elk County and the state of Pennsylvania.
- Country: United States
- State: Pennsylvania
- County: Elk
- Settled: 1825
- Incorporated: 1850

Area
  - Total: 86.95 sq mi (225.20 km^{2})
  - Land: 86.86 sq mi (224.96 km^{2})
  - Water: 0.089 sq mi (0.23 km^{2})

Population (2020)
  - Total: 398
  - Estimate (2022): 392
  - Density: 5.4/sq mi (2.09/km^{2})
- ZIP code: 16735
- Area code: 814
- FIPS code: 42-047-34464

Highland Township is a township in Elk County, Pennsylvania, United States. The population was 398 at the 2020 census, down from 492 in 2010.

== Geography ==
Highland Township is in northwestern Elk County, bordered on its west by Forest County, at its northwest corner by Warren County, and to the north by McKean County. According to the United States Census Bureau, the township has a total area of 87.0 square miles (225.2 km^{2}), of which 86.9 square miles (225.0 km^{2}) is land and 0.1 square miles (0.2 km^{2}), or 0.10%, is water. The township is on the Allegheny Plateau, with elevations ranging from 1,400 feet (430 m) above sea level in the valley of Pigeon Creek near the township's southwestern corner, to over 2,060 feet (630 m) in several places in the northeastern part of the township.

The township includes the unincorporated communities of James City, Russell City, Nansen, Highland Corners, Sackett, Four Corners, Pine Camp, Pigs Ear, McKinley, and Owls Nest.

== Climate ==
Highland Township, like many areas in the northeast, has four distinct seasons. The spring consists of many rainy and cool days with a lot of cloud cover, because of its proximity to Lake Erie. The summer is much warmer, but it is one of the few areas in Pennsylvania to never reach 100 °F (38 °C). The hottest temperature ever recorded was 96 °F (36 °C) on July 16, 1988. The fall is a relatively short period from September through early November. The trees in the area produce beautiful colors and then drop. The winters in Highland Township are rough. The period of winter can last from November all the way until mid to late April. Snowfall is very heavy in Highland Township, and low temperatures during the nighttime hours are brutal. The coldest temperature ever recorded is −39 °F (−39 °C) in 1994. Average snowfall is around 120 inches (3,000 mm) per year. The record snowfall is far above 250 inches (6,400 mm).

== Demographics ==
Historical population
Census	Pop.	Note	%±
2000	509		—
2010	492		−3.3%
2020	398		−19.1%
2022 (est.)	392		−1.5%
U.S. Decennial Census

=== 2010 ===
At the 2010 census there were 492 people, 216 households, and 144 families in the township. The population density was 5.6 people per square mile (2.2/km^{2}). There were 493 housing units at an average density of 5.7/sq mi (2.2/km^{2}). The racial makeup of the township was 98.6% White and 1.4% two or more races. There were 216 households, 20.4% had children under the age of 18 living with them, 51.4% were married couples living together, 5.6% had a female householder with no husband present, and 33.3% were non-families. 30.1% of households were made up of individuals, and 18.1% were one person aged 65 or older. The average household size was 2.28 and the average family size was 2.76.

The age distribution was 17.3% under the age of 18, 59.5% from 18 to 64, and 23.2% 65 or older. The median age was 46 years.

The median household income was $43,654 and the median family income was $44,712. Males had a median income of $52,500 versus $20,469 for females. The per capita income for the township was $19,610. About 14.6% of families and 14.5% of the population were below the poverty line, including 21.7% of those under age 18 and 18.6% of those age 65 or over.

=== 2000 ===
At the 2000 census there were 509 people, 210 households, and 145 families in the township. The population density was 5.9 people per square mile (2.3/km^{2}). There were 651 housing units at an average density of 7.5/sq mi (2.9/km^{2}). The racial makeup of the township was 99.61% White, 0.20% African American and 0.20% Native American. There were 210 households, 27.1% had children under the age of 18 living with them, 54.8% were married couples living together, 9.0% had a female householder with no husband present, and 30.5% were non-families. 27.1% of households were made up of individuals, and 11.4% were one person aged 65 or older. The average household size was 2.42 and the average family size was 2.90.

The age distribution was 23.2% under the age of 18, 6.3% from 18 to 24, 28.7% from 25 to 44, 25.3% from 45 to 64, and 16.5% 65 or older. The median age was 40 years. For every 100 females, there were 113.0 males. For every 100 females age 18 and over, there were 113.7 males.

The median household income was $34,643 and the median family income was $37,656. Males had a median income of $31,167 versus $20,000 for females. The per capita income for the township was $15,086. About 7.7% of families and 9.5% of the population were below the poverty line, including 14.0% of those under age 18 and 13.7% of those age 65 or over.
