= Klondike, Pennsylvania =

Unincorporated community in Pennsylvania, US

- Unincorporated community
- Location within Pennsylvania
- Coordinates: 41°51′37″N 78°48′1″W
- Country: United States
- State: Pennsylvania
- County: McKean
- Township: Corydon
- Elevation: 2,100 ft (640 m)
- Time zone: UTC-5 (Eastern (EST))
  - Summer (DST): UTC-4 (EDT)
- Area code: 814
- GNIS feature ID: 1209737

Klondike is an unincorporated community in Corydon Township in McKean County, Pennsylvania, United States. Klondike is located along Pennsylvania Route 59/Pennsylvania Route 321 east of the Allegheny Reservoir.
