= Howe, Pennsylvania =

Unincorporated community in Pennsylvania, U.S.

Coordinates: 41°12′54″N 79°06′08″W

Howe is an unincorporated community in Jefferson County, in the U.S. state of Pennsylvania.

== History ==
A post office called Howe was established in 1882, and remained in operation until 1913. It was one of two post offices in Eldred Township.
