= James City, Pennsylvania =

Unincorporated community in Pennsylvania, US

- Census-designated place
- Location within Pennsylvania Location within the United States
- Coordinates: 41°37′11″N 78°50′21″W
- Country: United States
- State: Pennsylvania
- County: Elk
- Township: Highland

Area
  - Total: 0.70 sq mi (1.82 km^{2})
  - Land: 0.70 sq mi (1.81 km^{2})
  - Water: 0 sq mi (0.00 km^{2})
- Elevation: 1,950 ft (590 m)

Population (2020)
  - Total: 207
  - Density: 295.6/sq mi (114.12/km^{2})
- Time zone: UTC-5 (Eastern (EST))
  - Summer (DST): UTC-4 (EDT)
- ZIP code: 16734
- FIPS code: 42-37656
- GNIS feature ID: 1209704

James City, formerly Durant City, is an unincorporated community and census-designated place in Elk County, Pennsylvania, United States. It lies approximately 4 miles (6 km) south of Kane, about 1 mile (1.6 km) away from Pennsylvania Route 66. It is in the northern part of Highland Township, and its northern border is the McKean County line. As of the 2020 census the CDP population was 207.

== Demographics ==
Historical population
Census	Pop.	Note	%±
2010	287		—
2020	207		−27.9%
U.S. Decennial Census
