= Pigs Ear, Pennsylvania =

Unincorporated community in Pennsylvania, US

- Unincorporated community
- Location within the state of Pennsylvania Pigs Ear (the United States)
- Coordinates: 41°33′48″N 78°56′13″W
- Country: United States
- State: Pennsylvania
- County: Elk
- Township: Highland
- Elevation: 1,588 ft (484 m)
- Time zone: UTC-5 (Eastern (EST))
  - Summer (DST): UTC-4 (EDT)
- GNIS feature ID: 1209888

Pigs Ear is an unincorporated community in Elk County, Pennsylvania, United States.
