= Kahletown, Pennsylvania =

Unincorporated community in Pennsylvania, U.S.

Coordinates: 41°16′21″N 79°09′26″W

Kahletown is an unincorporated community in Jefferson County, in the U.S. state of Pennsylvania.

== History ==
John Kahle was a schoolteacher at Kahletown in the 1830s.
