= Sigel, Pennsylvania =

- Unincorporated community
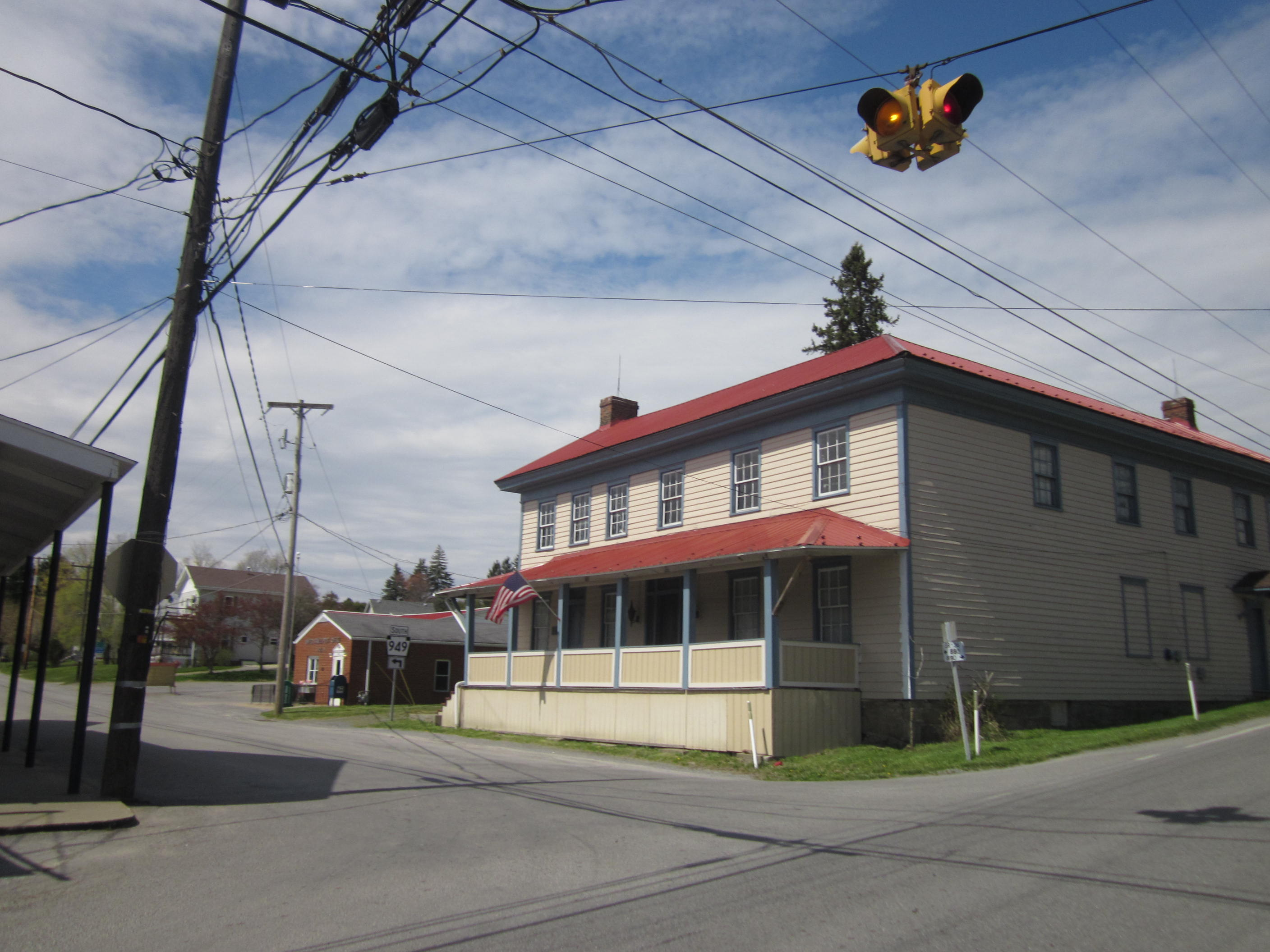
- Intersection of PA 36 and PA 949 in Sigel

- Location within Pennsylvania Location within the United States
- Coordinates: 41°16′30″N 79°06′47″W
- Country: United States
- State: Pennsylvania
- County: Jefferson
- Township: Eldred
- Elevation: 1,804 ft (550 m)
- Time zone: UTC-5 (Eastern (EST))
  - Summer (DST): UTC-4 (EDT)
- ZIP code: 15860
- Area code: 814
- GNIS feature ID: 1211954

Sigel is an unincorporated community in Eldred Township, Jefferson County, Pennsylvania, United States. The community is located at the intersection of Pennsylvania Route 36 and Pennsylvania Route 949, 8 miles (13 km) north of Brookville. Sigel has a post office with ZIP code 15860, which opened on May 26, 1862.

== History ==
Sigel was originally called Haggerty, and under the latter name was laid out in 1850 by Judah P. Haggerty. In 1865, it was renamed after German-American Civil War major general Franz Sigel.

== Notable person ==
- Bob Shawkey, former baseball player and member of the New York Yankees' first World Series championship team in 1923
