= Corydon Township, McKean County, Pennsylvania =

Township in Pennsylvania, United States

Coordinates: 41°55′00″N 78°49′59″W

Corydon Township, Pennsylvania
- Township
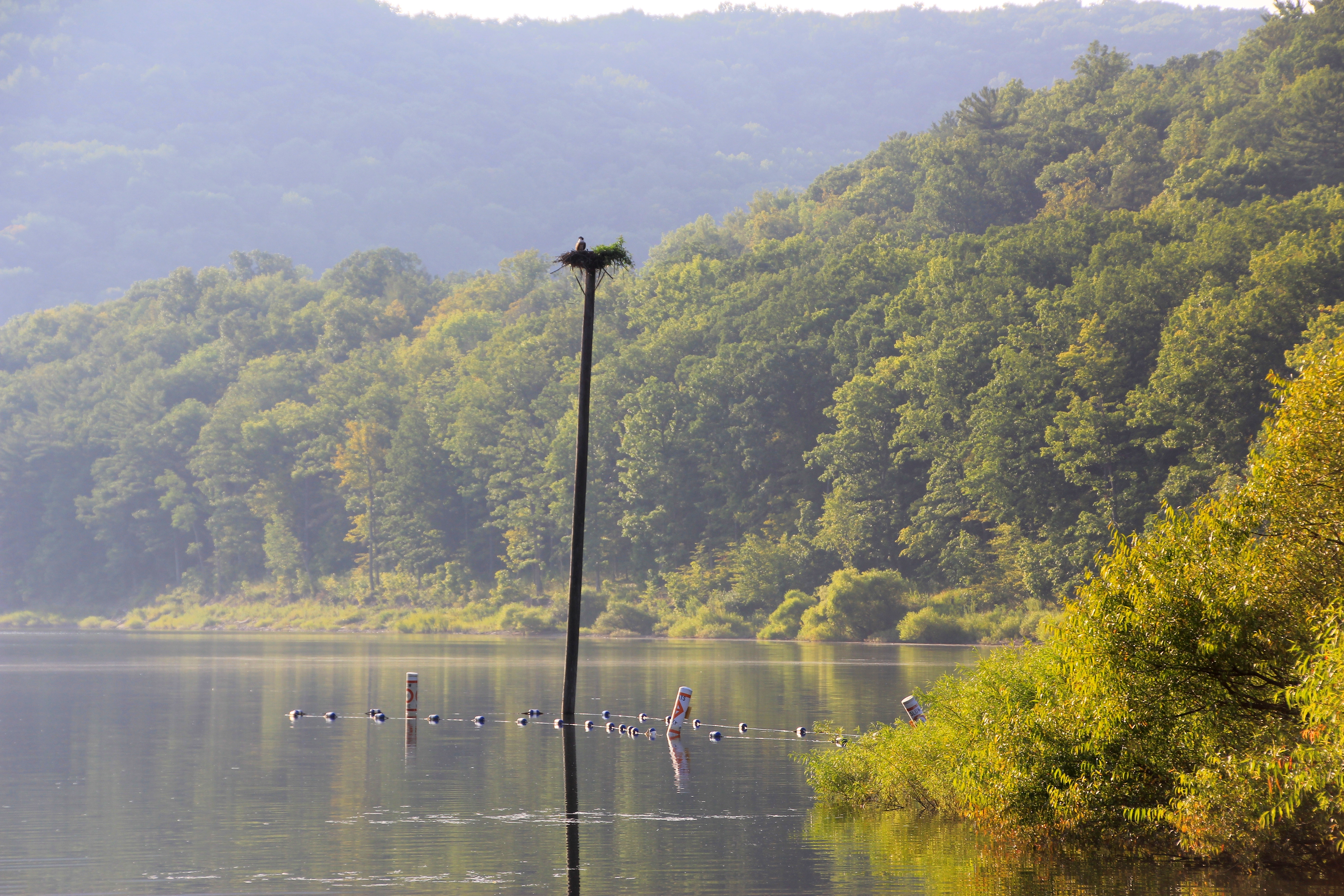
- Allegheny Reservoir within Corydon Township

- Logo

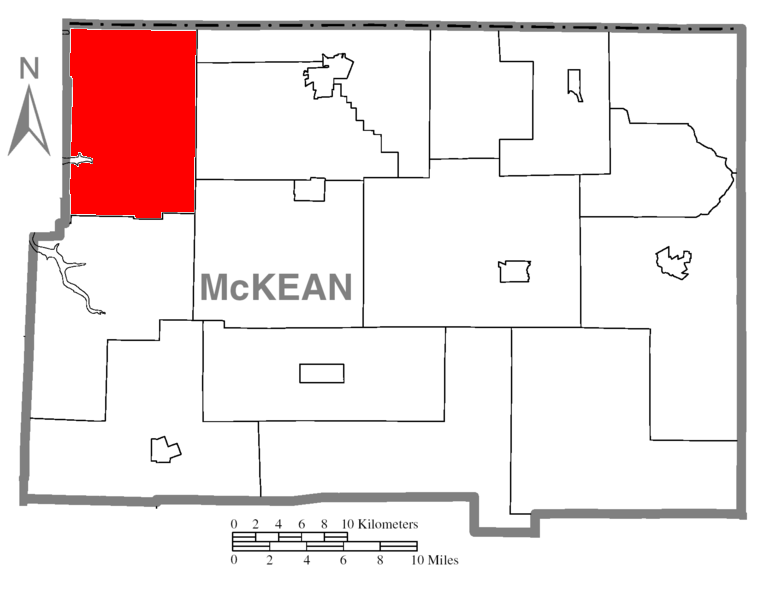
- Location in McKean County

- Location of McKean County in Pennsylvania
- Country: United States
- State: Pennsylvania
- County: McKean
- Settled: 1810
- Incorporated: 1829

Area
  - Total: 73.55 sq mi (190.5 km^{2})
  - Land: 73.09 sq mi (189.3 km^{2})
  - Water: 0.46 sq mi (1.2 km^{2})

Population (2020)
  - Total: 283 ▲
  - Estimate (2022): 283
  - Density: 3.7/sq mi (1.41/km^{2})
- Time zone: UTC-5 (Eastern (EST))
  - Summer (DST): UTC-4 (EDT)
- ZIP Code: 16701 (Bradford)
- Area code: 814
- FIPS code: 42-083-16352
- Website: www.corydontwp.com

Corydon Township is a township in McKean County, Pennsylvania, United States. The population was 283 at the 2020 census.

== History ==
Corydon was settled in 1810 and incorporated in 1829. On March 26, 1846, a small sliver of the westernmost portion of Corydon bordering the Allegheny River was transferred to Warren County; the new township also retained the name Corydon, resulting in there being two adjacent but separate townships with the same name. The Warren County township of Corydon was flooded and dissolved in 1964.

== Geography ==
Corydon Township occupies the northwest corner of McKean County. It is bordered to the west by Warren County, Pennsylvania, and to the north by Cattaraugus County, New York. Unincorporated communities include Klondike in the southeast, along Pennsylvania Route 59, and Stickney in the northeast, along Pennsylvania Route 346. Bradford, the largest municipality in McKean County, is 9 miles (14 km) east of Stickney.

According to the U.S. Census Bureau, Corydon Township has a total area of 73.6 square miles (191 km^{2}), of which 73.1 square miles (189 km^{2}) are land and 0.5 square miles (1.3 km^{2}), or 0.63%, are water, almost all of the latter coming from the Allegheny Reservoir. The entire township is within the watershed of the Allegheny River. The northern half of the township is drained by Willow Creek, while most of the southern half is drained by Sugar Run. South of PA 59, the southern edge of the township is drained by Morrison Run and tributaries of Chappel Fork.

== Demographics ==
Historical population
Census	Pop.	Note	%±
2000	301		—
2010	275		−8.6%
2020	283		2.9%
2022 (est.)	283		0.0%
U.S. Decennial Census

As of the census of 2000, there were 301 people, 122 households, and 85 families residing in the township. The population density was 4.1 people per square mile (1.6/km^{2}). There were 242 housing units at an average density of 3.3/sq mi (1.3/km^{2}). The racial makeup of the township was 99.00% White, 0.33% Asian, and 0.66% from two or more races. Hispanic or Latino of any race were 0.33% of the population.

There were 122 households, out of which 30.3% had children under the age of 18 living with them, 61.5% were married couples living together, 3.3% had a female householder with no husband present, and 30.3% were non-families. 26.2% of all households were made up of individuals, and 9.8% had someone living alone who was 65 years of age or older. The average household size was 2.47 and the average family size was 3.01.

In the township the population was spread out, with 25.6% under the age of 18, 4.3% from 18 to 24, 32.9% from 25 to 44, 25.6% from 45 to 64, and 11.6% who were 65 years of age or older. The median age was 40 years. For every 100 females, there were 115.0 males. For every 100 females age 18 and over, there were 117.5 males.

The median income for a household in the township was $35,208, and the median income for a family was $37,500. Males had a median income of $36,875 versus $29,375 for females. The per capita income for the township was $20,283. About 8.7% of families and 9.8% of the population were below the poverty line, including 9.9% of those under the age of eighteen and 14.3% of those sixty five or over.

== Notable people ==
Ray Caldwell, baseball star of the early 20th century, was born in Corydon.

Charles F. Freeman, Wisconsin politician and businessman, was also born in the township.
