= Russell City, Pennsylvania =

Unincorporated community in Pennsylvania, US

- Unincorporated community
- Location within Pennsylvania
- Coordinates: 41°34′17″N 78°54′31″W
- Country: United States
- State: Pennsylvania
- County: Elk
- Elevation: 1,909 ft (582 m)
- Time zone: UTC-5 (Eastern (EST))
  - Summer (DST): UTC-4 (EDT)
- ZIP code: 16728
- Area code: 814
- GNIS feature ID: 1209944

Russell City (also known as De Young or Deyoung) is an unincorporated community in Elk County, Pennsylvania, United States. The community is located along state routes 66 and 948, 14 miles (23 km) northwest of Ridgway. Russell City had a post office until April 23, 2005; it still has its own ZIP code, 16728. There has been considerable movements within the community to make it an official self-governing municipality.
