= Wetmore Township, Pennsylvania =

Township in Pennsylvania, US

Coordinates: 41°40′00″N 78°43′59″W

- Township
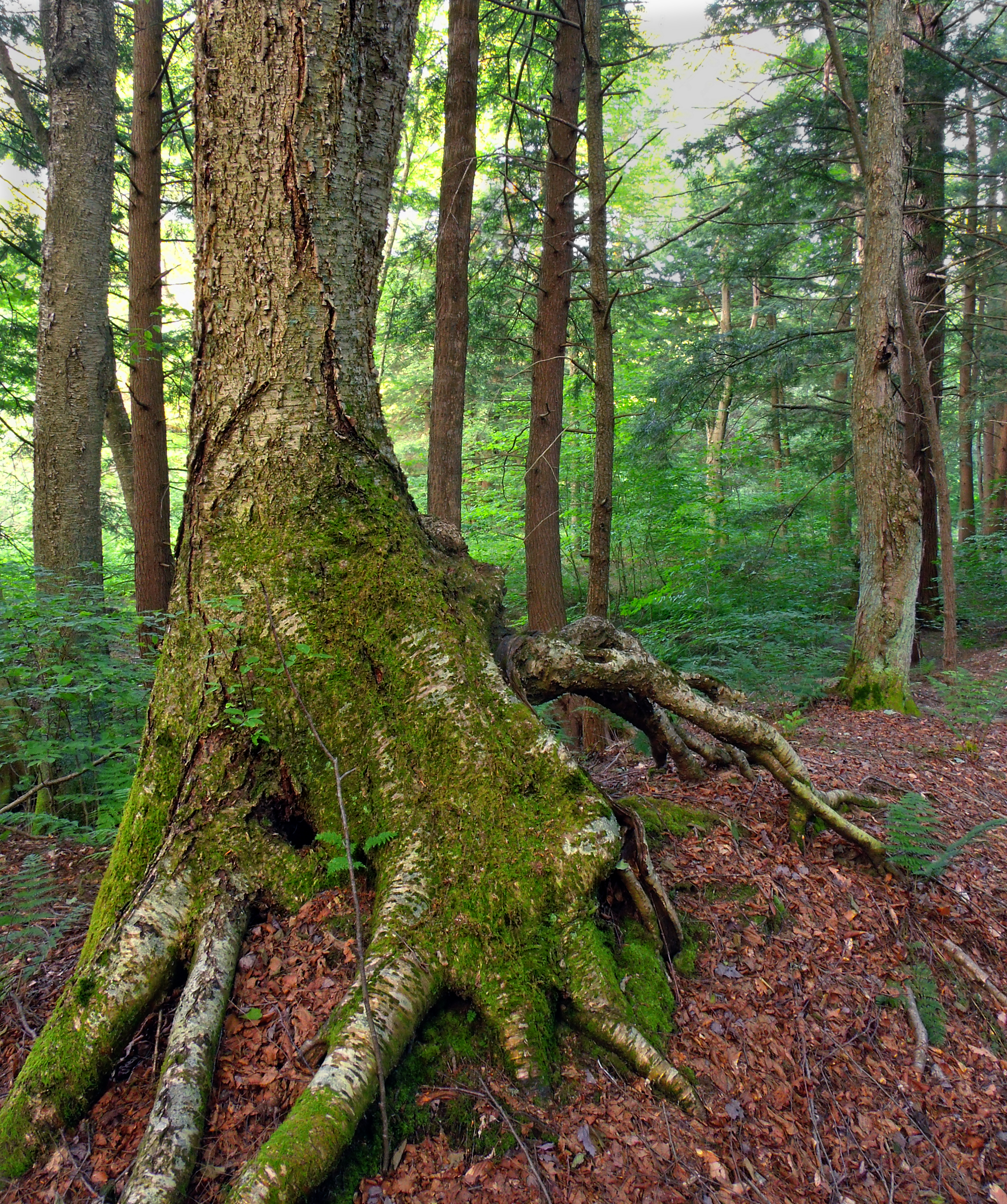
- Old-growth birch within the Allegheny National Forest in the township

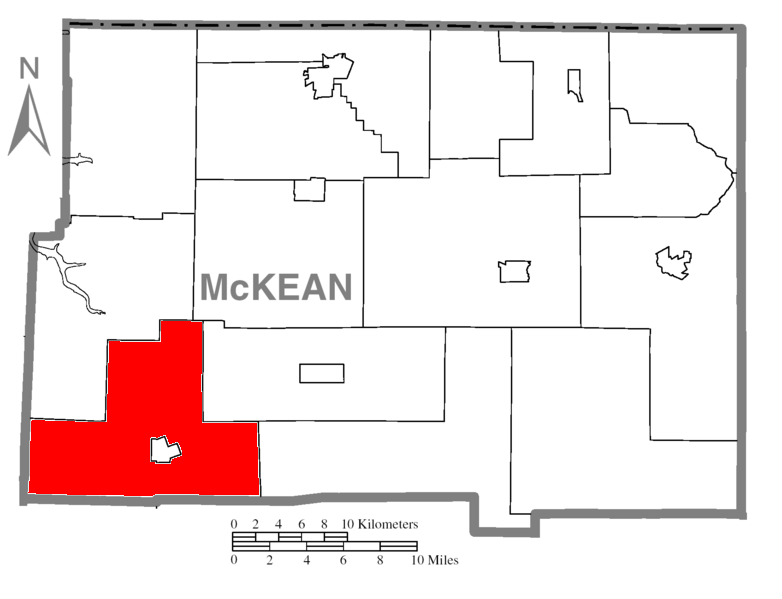
- Map of McKean County, Pennsylvania highlighting Wetmore Township

- Map of McKean County, Pennsylvania
- Country: United States
- State: Pennsylvania
- County: McKean
- Settled: 1820
- Incorporated: 1856

Area
  - Total: 78.09 sq mi (202.24 km^{2})
  - Land: 78.04 sq mi (202.11 km^{2})
  - Water: 0.046 sq mi (0.12 km^{2})

Population (2020)
  - Total: 1,620 ▼
  - Estimate (2022): 1,610
  - Density: 20.3/sq mi (7.85/km^{2})
- Time zone: UTC-5 (Eastern (EST))
  - Summer (DST): UTC-4 (EDT)
- Area code: 814
- FIPS code: 42-083-84312
- Website: https://wetmoretwp.com/

Wetmore Township is a township in McKean County, Pennsylvania, United States. The population was 1,620 at the 2020 census.

== Geography ==
According to the United States Census Bureau, the township has a total area of 79.0 square miles (204.6 km^{2}), all land.

== Demographics ==
Historical population
| Census | Pop. | Note | %± |
|---|---|---|---|
| 2000 | 1,721 | | — |
| 2010 | 1,650 | | −4.1% |
| 2020 | 1,620 | | −1.8% |
| 2022 (est.) | 1,610 | | −0.6% |
U.S. Decennial Census

As of the census of 2000, there were 1,721 people, 709 households, and 524 families residing in the township. The population density was 21.8 people per square mile (8.4/km^{2}). There were 894 housing units at an average density of 11.3/sq mi (4.4/km^{2}). The racial makeup of the township was 99.59% White, 0.06% African American, 0.06% Pacific Islander, 0.12% from other races, and 0.17% from two or more races. Hispanic or Latino of any race were 0.17% of the population.

There were 709 households, out of which 29.1% had children under the age of 18 living with them, 64.5% were married couples living together, 5.8% had a female householder with no husband present, and 26.0% were non-families. 22.8% of all households were made up of individuals, and 10.6% had someone living alone who was 65 years of age or older. The average household size was 2.42 and the average family size was 2.85.

In the township the population was spread out, with 22.4% under the age of 18, 6.2% from 18 to 24, 26.8% from 25 to 44, 28.1% from 45 to 64, and 16.4% who were 65 years of age or older. The median age was 42 years. For every 100 females, there were 106.4 males. For every 100 females age 18 and over, there were 104.8 males.

The median income for a household in the township was $36,857, and the median income for a family was $41,779. Males had a median income of $32,738 versus $22,875 for females. The per capita income for the township was $17,128. About 6.9% of families and 9.3% of the population were below the poverty line, including 16.7% of those under age 18 and 3.2% of those age 65 or over.
