= Hamilton Township, McKean County, Pennsylvania =

Township in Pennsylvania, United States

Coordinates: 41°48′00″N 78°49′59″W

- Township
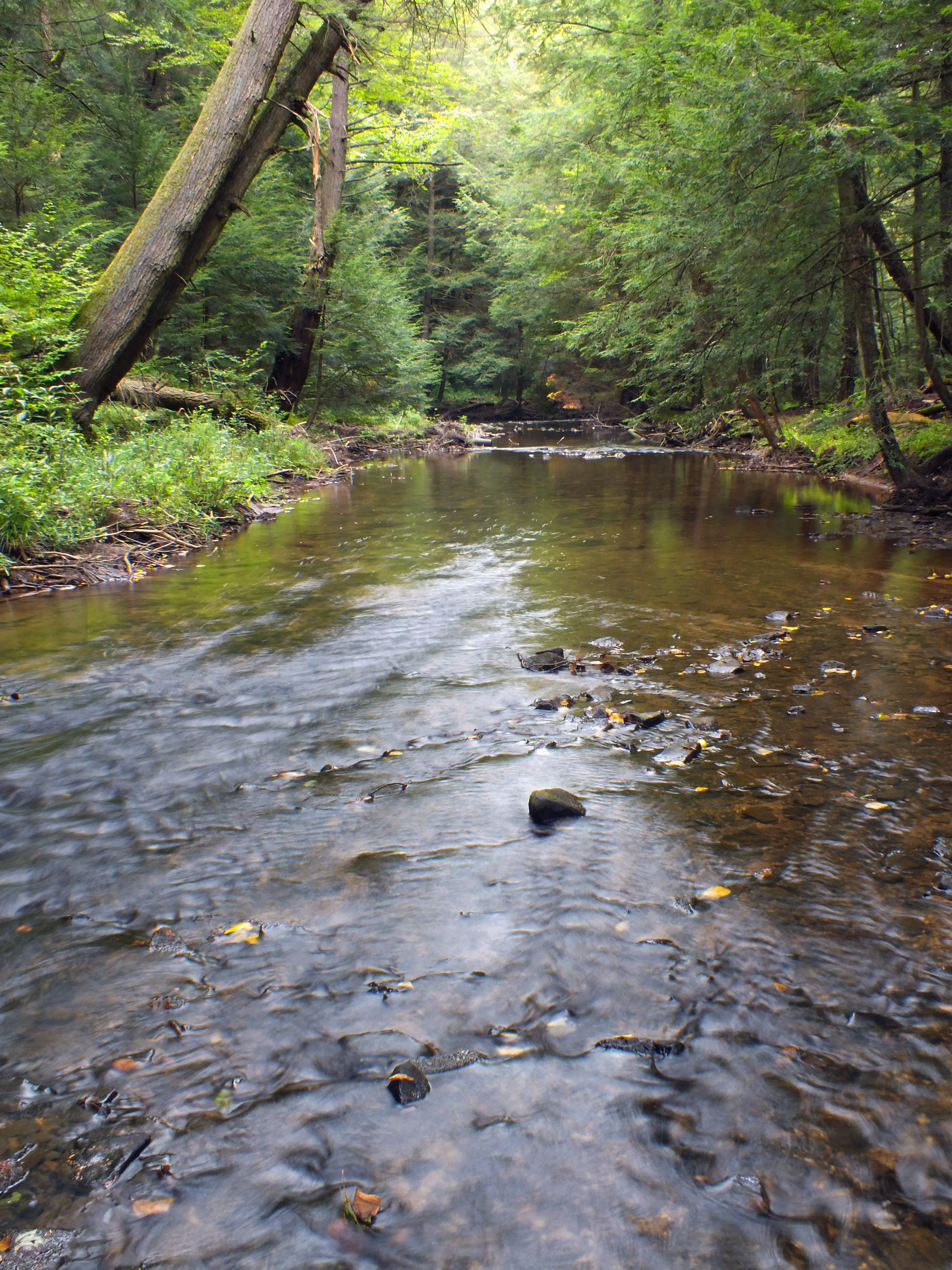
- Twomile Run in the township

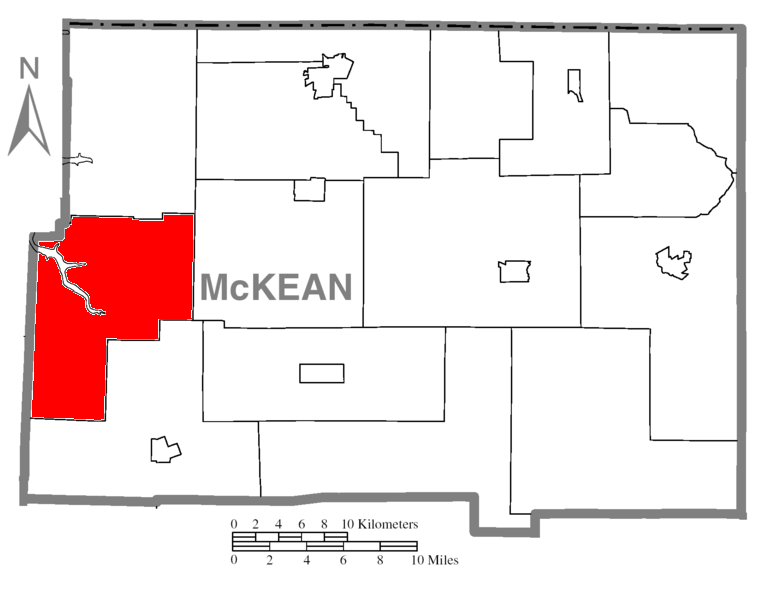
- Location in McKean County

- Location of McKean County in Pennsylvania
- Country: United States
- State: Pennsylvania
- County: McKean
- Settled: 1810
- Incorporated: 1834

Area
  - Total: 73.76 sq mi (191.0 km^{2})
  - Land: 71.81 sq mi (186.0 km^{2})
  - Water: 1.95 sq mi (5.1 km^{2})

Population (2020)
  - Total: 549 ▲
  - Estimate (2022): 540
  - Density: 7.5/sq mi (2.9/km^{2})
- Time zone: UTC-5 (Eastern (EST))
  - Summer (DST): UTC-4 (EDT)
- ZIP Codes: 16333 (Ludlow); 16701 (Bradford); 16735 (Kane); 16738 (Lewis Run)
- Area code: 814
- FIPS code: 42-083-32168
- Website: https://hamlintwp.com/

Hamilton Township is a township in McKean County, Pennsylvania, United States. The population was 549 at the 2020 census.

== Geography ==
The township is in western McKean County and is bordered to the west by Warren County. Kinzua Bay, the Kinzua Creek arm of the Allegheny Reservoir, is in the western part of the township. According to the U.S. Census Bureau, the township has a total area of 73.8 square miles (191 km^{2}), of which 71.8 square miles (186 km^{2}) are land and 1.9 square miles (4.9 km^{2}), or 2.64%, are water, mainly within Kinzua Bay. The northern and central parts of the township are drained by Kinzua Creek, which runs from southeast to northwest, while the southern part is drained by Twomile Run and the East Branch of Tionesta Creek, both west-flowing.

U.S. Route 6 passes through the hamlet of Ludlow in the southwestern part of the township; the highway leads southeast to Kane and northwest to Warren.

== Demographics ==
Historical population
Census	Pop.	Note	%±
2000	637		—
2010	543		−14.8%
2020	549		1.1%
2023 (est.)	540		−1.6%
U.S. Decennial Census

As of the census of 2000, there were 637 people, 288 households, and 180 families residing in the township. The population density was 8.8 people per square mile (3.4/km^{2}). There were 623 housing units at an average density of 8.7/sq mi (3.3/km^{2}). The racial makeup of the township was 98.90% White, 0.16% African American, 0.16% Native American, and 0.78% from two or more races. Hispanic or Latino of any race were 0.31% of the population.

There were 288 households, out of which 24.3% had children under the age of 18 living with them, 51.7% were married couples living together, 8.0% had a female householder with no husband present, and 37.2% were non-families. 33.0% of all households were made up of individuals, and 18.4% had someone living alone who was 65 years of age or older. The average household size was 2.21 and the average family size was 2.77.

In the township the population was spread out, with 21.0% under the age of 18, 6.4% from 18 to 24, 27.9% from 25 to 44, 24.8% from 45 to 64, and 19.8% who were 65 years of age or older. The median age was 42 years. For every 100 females, there were 102.9 males. For every 100 females age 18 and over, there were 105.3 males.

The median income for a household in the township was $32,917, and the median income for a family was $38,500. Males had a median income of $35,795 versus $18,750 for females. The per capita income for the township was $18,796. About 2.4% of families and 5.5% of the population were below the poverty line, including 4.1% of those under age 18 and 14.0% of those age 65 or over.
