= National Register of Historic Places listings in Elk County, Pennsylvania =

Location of Elk County in Pennsylvania

This is a list of the National Register of Historic Places listings in Elk County, Pennsylvania.

This is intended to be a complete list of the properties and districts on the National Register of Historic Places in Elk County, Pennsylvania, United States. The locations of National Register properties and districts for which the latitude and longitude coordinates are included below, may be seen in a map.

There are 12 properties and districts listed on the National Register in the county.

This National Park Service list is complete through NPS recent listings posted March 14, 2025.

== Current listings ==
	Name on the Register	Image	Date listed	Location	Municipality	Description
1	Bonifels	Bonifels	December 14, 1978 (#78002396)	West of Ridgway off Laurel Mill Road; 41°25′11″N 78°45′17″W	Ridgway Township	
2	Decker's Chapel	Decker's Chapel	November 12, 1998 (#98001367)	Junction of Earth Road and Pennsylvania Route 255; 41°24′03″N 78°33′38″W	St. Marys	
3	O.B. Grant House	O.B. Grant House	April 5, 2004 (#04000268)	610 West Main Street; 41°25′17″N 78°44′57″W	Ridgway	
4	Irwintown Site	Irwintown Site	September 25, 2012 (#12000822)	Northern bank of the Clarion River, above Hallton; 41°24′03″N 78°54′23″W	Spring Creek Township	
5	Johnsonburg Commercial Historic District	Johnsonburg Commercial Historic District	October 28, 1999 (#99001290)	Roughly along Center, Bridge, and Market Streets; 41°29′20″N 78°40′31″W	Johnsonburg	
6	Lake City School	Lake City School	June 10, 2008 (#08000519)	27586 Lake City Road in Lake City; 41°21′54″N 78°53′07″W	Spring Creek Township	
7	Loleta Recreation Area	Loleta Recreation Area	November 24, 2015 (#15000828)	Along Legislative Route 3002 near its junction with Millstone Rd. 41°24′00″N 79°04′55″W	Millstone Township	Nomination form
8	Ridgway Armory	Ridgway Armory	December 22, 1989 (#89002078)	72 North Broad Street; 41°25′24″N 78°43′48″W	Ridgway	
9	Ridgway Historic District	Ridgway Historic District	January 22, 2003 (#02001180)	Roughly bounded by the borough limits, the Clarion River, Erie Alley, and Gallagher Run; 41°25′12″N 78°43′40″W	Ridgway	
10	St. Marys Historic District	St. Marys Historic District	November 25, 1998 (#98001368)	Roughly bounded by Walburga, St. Michael, Fourth, John, and Mill Streets; 41°25′43″N 78°33′49″W	St. Marys	
11	Swedish Lutheran Parsonage	Swedish Lutheran Parsonage	February 24, 2005 (#05000099)	230 Kane Street in Wilcox; 41°34′34″N 78°41′14″W	Jones Township	
12	John E. Weidenboerner House	John E. Weidenboerner House	July 24, 1992 (#92000931)	North St. Michael Street; 41°25′45″N 78°33′43″W	St. Marys	

== See also ==
- List of National Historic Landmarks in Pennsylvania
- National Register of Historic Places listings in Pennsylvania
- List of Pennsylvania state historical markers in Elk County
