= Tributaries of the Clarion River =

The Tributaries of the Clarion River drain parts of Jefferson, Clarion, and Armstrong counties, Pennsylvania. The following table lists all the named tributaries of the Clarion River, a tributary of the Allegheny River. For each stream, the name, tributary number, coordinate and political subdivision of the confluence, and coordinate of the source are given.

== Direct tributaries ==
Name	Number	Bank	Mouth	Political subdivision	Source	Political subdivision
West Branch Clarion River	1	Right	41°29′29″N 78°40′42″W (elev. 1,437 feet (438 m))	Johnsonburg, Pennsylvania	41°43′08″N 78°38′48″W	Mount Jewett, Pennsylvania
East Branch Clarion River	2	Left	41°29′29″N 78°40′41″W (elev. 1,440 feet (440 m))	Johnsonburg, Pennsylvania	41°40′33″N 78°29′07″W	Sergeant Township, McKean County
Johnson Run	3	Right	41°29′20″N 78°40′42″W (elev. 1,437 feet (438 m))	Johnsonburg, Pennsylvania	41°30′00″N 78°42′25″W	Ridgway Township, Elk County
Powers Run	4	Left	41°28′46″N 78°40′19″W (elev. 1,424 feet (434 m))	Johnsonburg, Pennsylvania	41°29′40″N 78°33′25″W	St. Marys, Pennsylvania
Riley Run	5	Right	41°27′14″N 78°42′31″W (elev. 1,414 feet (431 m))	Ridgway Township, Elk County	41°28′22″N 78°41′53″W	Ridgway Township, Elk County
Little Mill Creek	6	Right	41°27′12″N 78°43′12″W (elev. 1,381 feet (421 m))	Ridgway Township, Elk County	41°33′25″N 78°45′29″W	Jones Township, Elk County
Mason Creek	7	Right	41°26′20″N 78°43′54″W (elev. 1,371 feet (418 m))	Ridgway Township, Elk County	41°28′12″N 78°45′52″W	Ridgway Township, Elk County
Elk Creek	8	Left	41°25′18″N 78°44′03″W (elev. 1,362 feet (415 m))	Ridgway, Pennsylvania	41°28′49″N 78°33′57″W	St. Marys, Pennsylvania
Island Run	9	Left	41°23′50″N 78°45′09″W (elev. 1,348 feet (411 m))	Ridgway Township, Elk County	41°23′53″N 78°45′06″W	Ridgway Township, Elk County
Big Mill Creek	10	Right	41°23′44″N 78°45′46″W (elev. 1,342 feet (409 m))	Ridgway Township, Elk County	41°35′55″N 78°47′34″W	Jones Township, Elk County
Connerville Run	11	Right	41°22′49″N 78°46′59″W (elev. 1,332 feet (406 m))	Ridgway Township, Elk County	41°23′46″N 78°47′39″W	Ridgway Township, Elk County
Dog Hollow Run	12	Left	41°22′26″N 78°47′32″W (elev. 1,325 feet (404 m))	Ridgway Township, Elk County	41°21′43″N 78°45′22″W	Ridgway Township, Elk County
Gillis Run	13	Right	41°22′29″N 78°48′43″W (elev. 1,329 feet (405 m))	Ridgway Township, Elk County	41°23′13″N 78°48′12″W	Ridgway Township, Elk County
Little Toby Creek	14	Left	41°21′59″N 78°49′25″W (elev. 1,322 feet (403 m))	Spring Creek Township, Elk County	41°19′55″N 78°36′32″W	Fox Township, Elk County, Pennsylvania
Bear Creek	15	Right	41°22′53″N 78°49′53″W (elev. 1,335 feet (407 m))	Spring Creek Township, Elk County	41°34′04″N 78°49′05″W	Highland Township, Elk County
Mahood Run	16	Left	41°22′24″N 78°51′03″W (elev. 1,302 feet (397 m))	Spring Creek Township, Elk County	41°21′12″N 78°50′43″W	Spring Creek Township, Elk County
Beech Bottom Run	17	Left	41°23′21″N 78°52′30″W (elev. 1,289 feet (393 m))	Spring Creek Township, Elk County	41°20′41″N 78°51′16″W	Spring Creek Township, Elk County
Lake City Run	18	Left	41°23′21″N 78°52′34″W (elev. 1,283 feet (391 m))	Spring Creek Township, Elk County	41°22′06″N 78°53′28″W	Spring Creek Township, Elk County
Crow Run	19	Right	41°23′53″N 78°53′09″W (elev. 1,276 feet (389 m))	Spring Creek Township, Elk County	41°26′08″N 78°51′27″W	Spring Creek Township, Elk County
Irwin Run	20	Right	41°24′00″N 78°54′19″W (elev. 1,276 feet (389 m))	Spring Creek Township, Elk County	41°26′56″N 78°52′41″W	Spring Creek Township, Elk County
Spring Creek	21	Right	41°24′02″N 78°55′57″W (elev. 1,257 feet (383 m))	Spring Creek Township, Elk County	41°32′23″N 79°01′40″W	Howe Township, Forest County
Maxwell Run	22	Left	41°23′04″N 78°56′05″W (elev. 1,250 feet (380 m))	Spring Creek Township, Elk County	41°19′03″N 78°51′15″W	Spring Creek Township, Elk County
Elliott Run	23	Right	41°22′57″N 78°56′37″W (elev. 1,257 feet (383 m))	Spring Creek Township, Elk County	41°23′38″N 78°57′45″W	Millstone Township, Elk County
Daugherty Run	24	Left	41°22′11″N 78°57′38″W (elev. 1,253 feet (382 m))	Heath Township, Jefferson County	41°21′27″N 78°56′22″W	Spring Creek Township, Elk County
Raught Run	25	Left	41°22′10″N 78°57′50″W (elev. 1,240 feet (380 m))	Heath Township, Jefferson County	41°20′10″N 78°58′00″W	Heath Township, Jefferson County
Painter Run	26		41°22′18″N 78°58′01″W (elev. 1,237 feet (377 m))	Heath Township, Jefferson County	41°23′17″N 78°58′02″W	Millstone Township, Elk County
Church Run	27	Right	41°22′35″N 78°58′24″W (elev. 1,243 feet (379 m))	Millstone Township, Elk County	41°24′06″N 78°59′21″W	Millstone Township, Elk County
Clyde Run	28	Right	41°22′23″N 78°58′34″W (elev. 1,230 feet (370 m))	Heath Township, Jefferson County	41°22′58″N 78°59′27″W	Millstone Township, Elk County
Callen Run	29	Left	41°21′01″N 79°00′54″W (elev. 1,240 feet (380 m))	Heath Township, Jefferson County	41°18′50″N 78°57′43″W	Polk Township, Jefferson County
Cline Run	30	Right	41°21′26″N 79°01′37″W (elev. 1,237 feet (377 m))	Millstone Township, Elk County	41°22′54″N 79°00′32″W	Millstone Township, Elk County
Wyncoop Run	31	Right	41°21′26″N 79°02′15″W (elev. 1,207 feet (368 m))	Heath Township, Jefferson County	41°24′08″N 79°00′12″W	Millstone Township, Elk County
Leeper Run	32	Left	41°21′16″N 79°02′32″W (elev. 1,224 feet (373 m))	Heath Township, Jefferson County	41°20′06″N 79°01′59″W	Heath Township, Jefferson County
Pine Run	33	Left	41°21′00″N 79°03′35″W (elev. 1,207 feet (368 m))	Heath Township, Jefferson County	41°19′51″N 79°02′44″W	Heath Township, Jefferson County
Millstone Creek	34	Right	41°21′13″N 79°04′17″W (elev. 1,207 feet (368 m))	Millstone Township, Elk County	41°22′25″N 79°05′02″W	Millstone Township, Elk County
Shippen Run	35	Right	41°20′33″N 79°05′57″W (elev. 1,197 feet (365 m))	Barnett Township, Forest County	41°22′07″N 79°06′00″W	Barnett Township, Forest County
Clear Creek	36	Left	41°19′46″N 79°06′12″W (elev. 1,194 feet (364 m))	Barnett Township, Jefferson County	41°19′09″N 79°00′28″W	Heath Township, Jefferson County
Tadler Run	37	Left	41°19′49″N 79°07′28″W (elev. 1,194 feet (364 m))	Barnett Township, Jefferson County	41°18′41″N 79°06′57″W	Barnett Township, Jefferson County
Cherry Run	38	Right	41°19′59″N 79°07′32″W (elev. 1,207 feet (368 m))	Barnett Township, Forest County	41°22′37″N 79°08′02″W	Barnett Township, Forest County
Maple Creek	39	Right	41°20′29″N 79°08′18″W (elev. 1,178 feet (359 m))	Barnett Township, Jefferson County	41°27′12″N 79°08′21″W	Jenks Township, Forest County, Pennsylvania
Coleman Run	40	Right	41°20′38″N 79°09′56″W (elev. 1,184 feet (361 m))	Barnett Township, Forest County	41°22′42″N 79°12′39″W	Farmington Township, Clarion County
Troutman Run	41	Right	41°20′20″N 79°11′05″W (elev. 1,161 feet (354 m))	Barnett Township, Jefferson County	41°21′19″N 79°12′01″W	Barnett Township, Forest County
Henry Run	42	Right	41°19′27″N 79°11′31″W (elev. 1,155 feet (352 m))	Barnett Township, Jefferson County	41°20′20″N 79°12′12″W	Barnett Township, Forest County
Toms Run	43	Right	41°19′55″N 79°12′25″W (elev. 1,158 feet (353 m))	Barnett Township, Forest County	41°24′41″N 79°14′20″W	Farmington Township, Clarion County
Henry Run	44	Right	41°19′15″N 79°13′36″W (elev. 1,145 feet (349 m))	Farmington Township, Clarion County	41°21′17″N 79°15′06″W	Farmington Township, Clarion County
Cathers Run	45	Left	41°19′00″N 79°14′01″W (elev. 1,138 feet (347 m))	Millcreek Township, Clarion County	41°15′00″N 79°06′59″W	Eldred Township, Jefferson County
Watson Run	46	Right	41°18′32″N 79°15′26″W (elev. 1,122 feet (342 m))	Farmington Township, Clarion County	41°19′49″N 79°16′04″W	Farmington Township, Clarion County
Maxwell Run	47	Left	41°17′30″N 79°16′08″W (elev. 1,125 feet (343 m))	Millcreek Township, Clarion County	41°17′20″N 79°13′45″W	Millcreek Township, Clarion County
Callihan Run	48	Right	41°16′48″N 79°17′42″W (elev. 1,102 feet (336 m))	Highland Township, Clarion County	41°18′36″N 79°17′05″W	Highland Township, Clarion County
Blyson Run	49	Left	41°16′07″N 79°18′09″W (elev. 1,096 feet (334 m))	Millcreek Township, Clarion County	41°16′03″N 79°14′38″W	Millcreek Township, Clarion County
McGourvey Run	50	Right	41°14′34″N 79°18′47″W (elev. 1,089 feet (332 m))	Millcreek Township, Clarion County	41°16′13″N 79°19′35″W	Highland Township, Clarion County
Mill Creek	51	Left	41°14′08″N 79°19′16″W (elev. 1,089 feet (332 m))	Millcreek Township, Clarion County	41°15′32″N 79°06′35″W	Eldred Township, Jefferson County
Reed Run	52	Right	41°13′36″N 79°20′19″W (elev. 1,089 feet (332 m))	Highland Township, Clarion County	41°14′58″N 79°20′36″W	Highland Township, Clarion County
Toby Creek	53	Right	41°13′35″N 79°23′24″W (elev. 1,089 feet (332 m))	Highland Township, Clarion County	41°23′18″N 79°16′51″W	Farmington Township, Clarion County
Trout Run	54	Left	41°12′08″N 79°24′22″W (elev. 1,093 feet (333 m))	Monroe Township, Clarion County	41°11′40″N 79°22′19″W	Clarion Township, Clarion County
Courtleys Run	55	Left	41°11′20″N 79°24′43″W (elev. 1,119 feet (341 m))	Monroe Township, Clarion County	41°11′25″N 79°23′16″W	Monroe Township, Clarion County
Piney Reservoir	56		41°11′30″N 79°26′05″W (elev. 1,053 feet (321 m))	Piney Township, Clarion County		
Piney Dam	57		41°11′32″N 79°26′01″W (elev. 1,056 feet (322 m))	Paint Township, Clarion County		
Piney Creek	58	Left	41°10′10″N 79°28′24″W (elev. 997 feet (304 m))	Piney Township, Clarion County	41°09′44″N 79°14′09″W	Limestone Township, Clarion County, Pennsylvania
Deer Creek	59	Right	41°10′18″N 79°28′44″W (elev. 997 feet (304 m))	Beaver Township, Clarion County	41°17′16″N 79°31′46″W	Ashland Township, Clarion County
Canoe Creek	60	Right	41°09′44″N 79°31′58″W (elev. 984 feet (300 m))	Beaver Township, Clarion County	41°16′28″N 79°33′54″W	Ashland Township, Clarion County
Beaver Creek	61	Right	41°09′37″N 79°32′50″W (elev. 978 feet (298 m))	Licking Township, Clarion County	41°15′56″N 79°35′03″W	Ashland Township, Clarion County
Licking Creek	62	Left	41°07′44″N 79°33′35″W (elev. 958 feet (292 m))	Licking Township, Clarion County	41°03′55″N 79°26′12″W	Porter Township, Clarion County
Turkey Run	63	Right	41°09′12″N 79°37′50″W (elev. 892 feet (272 m))	Richland Township, Clarion County	41°14′35″N 79°36′21″W	Salem Township, Clarion County

== See also ==
- List of tributaries of the Allegheny River
- Tributaries of the Allegheny River
