= Johnsonburg Area School District =

School district in Pennsylvania

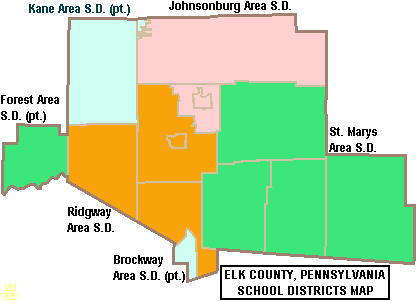

Address
- 315 High School Road Johnsonburg, Elk County, Pennsylvania, 15845; United States

District information
- Type: Public

Other information
- Website: https://www.johnsonburgasd.net/

The Johnsonburg Area School District is a small, rural, public school district that serves parts of Elk County, Pennsylvania. It encompasses the communities of Johnsonburg, Ridgway Township, and Jones Township. Johnsonburg Area School District encompasses 227 square miles (590 km^{2}).

According to 2000 federal census data, it serves a resident population of 7,526.

== History and demographics ==
In 2009, the district residents’ per capita income was $16,810, while the median family income was $42,131. In the Commonwealth, the median family income was $49,501 and the United States median family income was $49,445, in 2010. The district operates one elementary school and one junior/senior high school.

== Extracurriculars ==
The district offers a variety of clubs, activities and an extensive sports program.

=== Extracurriculars ===
The district offers the following:

- Drama Club
- FFA (Future Farmers of America)
- French Club
- National Honor Society
- Photography Club
- Stand Tall
- Varsity Club
- Student Council
- Yearbook Club

=== Sports ===
The District funds:

Boys

- Baseball - A
- Basketball- A
- Cross Country - A
- Football - A
- Golf - AA
- Soccer - A
- Tennis - AA
- Track and Field - AA
- Wrestling - AA

Girls

- Basketball - A
- Cross Country - A
- Softball - A
- Girls' Tennis - AA
- Track and Field - AA
- Volleyball

Junior high school sports

Boys

- Basketball
- Cross Country
- Football
- Track and Field
- Wrestling

Girls

- Basketball
- Cross Country
- Track and Field
- Volleyball

According to PIAA directory July 2012
