= Pine Township, Pennsylvania =

Pine Township is the name of some places in the U.S. state of Pennsylvania:

- Pine Township, Allegheny County, Pennsylvania
- Pine Township, Armstrong County, Pennsylvania
- Pine Township, Clearfield County, Pennsylvania
- Pine Township, Columbia County, Pennsylvania
- Pine Township, Crawford County, Pennsylvania
- Pine Township, Indiana County, Pennsylvania
- Pine Township, Lycoming County, Pennsylvania
- Pine Township, Mercer County, Pennsylvania

See also:

- Pine Creek Township, Clinton County, Pennsylvania
- Pine Creek Township, Jefferson County, Pennsylvania
- Pine Grove Township, Schuylkill County, Pennsylvania
- Pine Grove Township, Warren County, Pennsylvania
- Pinegrove Township, Pennsylvania
- Piney Township, Pennsylvania
