= Highland Township, Pennsylvania =

Highland Township is the name of some places in the U.S. state of Pennsylvania:

- Highland Township, Adams County, Pennsylvania
- Highland Township, Chester County, Pennsylvania
- Highland Township, Clarion County, Pennsylvania
- Highland Township, Elk County, Pennsylvania
