= Millstone Township =

Millstone Township may refer to:

- Millstone Township, New Jersey
- Millstone Township, Pennsylvania
