= Elk County Courthouse =

Elk County Courthouse may refer to:

- Elk County Courthouse (Kansas), Howard, Kansas
- Elk County Courthouse (Pennsylvania), part of the Ridgway Historic District, Ridgway, Pennsylvania
