= Johnsonburg Area High School =

Coordinates: 41.5067°N 78.6836°W

- Johnsonburg, Pennsylvania; United States

Information
- School type: High school
- School district: Johnsonburg Area School District
- Enrollment: c.250
- Colors: Blue and gold
- Mascot: Rams
- Website: www.johnsonburgasd.net/jahs-home

Johnsonburg Area High School is located in Johnsonburg, Pennsylvania.

== School structure ==
The school is part of the Johnsonburg Area School District. It enrolls grades 7-12 and has an enrollment of 250 students. The school mascot is the Rams and the school colours are blue and gold.

== Athletics ==
Basketball, football, wrestling, volleyball, track and field, golf, and cross country
