= List of Pennsylvania state historical markers in Elk County =

Location of Elk County in Pennsylvania

This is a list of the Pennsylvania state historical markers in Elk County.

This is intended to be a complete list of the official state historical markers placed in Elk County, Pennsylvania by the Pennsylvania Historical and Museum Commission (PHMC). The locations of the historical markers, as well as the latitude and longitude coordinates as provided by the PHMC's database, are included below when available. There are 4 historical markers located in Elk County.

== Historical markers ==
Marker title	Image	Date dedicated	Location	Marker type	Topics
Elk County		July 22, 1982	County Courthouse, South Main Street, Ridgway; 41.421794°N 78.729916°W	City	Environment, Government & Politics, Government & Politics 19th Century
First State Game Lands		October 20, 1950	Glen Hazel Road, south of Bendigo Road, Wilcox; 41.5345°N 78.60728°W	Roadside	Environment, Government & Politics 20th Century
Iroquois "Main Road"		October 7, 1950	PA 66 & 948, Highland Township, Johnsonburg (MISSING)	Roadside	African American, French & Indian War, Military, Native American
St. Marys		n/a	St. Mary's Street (PA 255) & State Street (PA 120) near the Diamond, St. Marys; 41.42838°N 78.56133°W	Roadside	Cities & Towns, Ethnic & Immigration, Religion

== See also ==
- List of Pennsylvania state historical markers
- National Register of Historic Places listings in Elk County, Pennsylvania
