= Monroe Township, Clarion County, Pennsylvania =

Township in Pennsylvania, US

Coordinates: 41°08′17″N 79°24′09″W

- Township
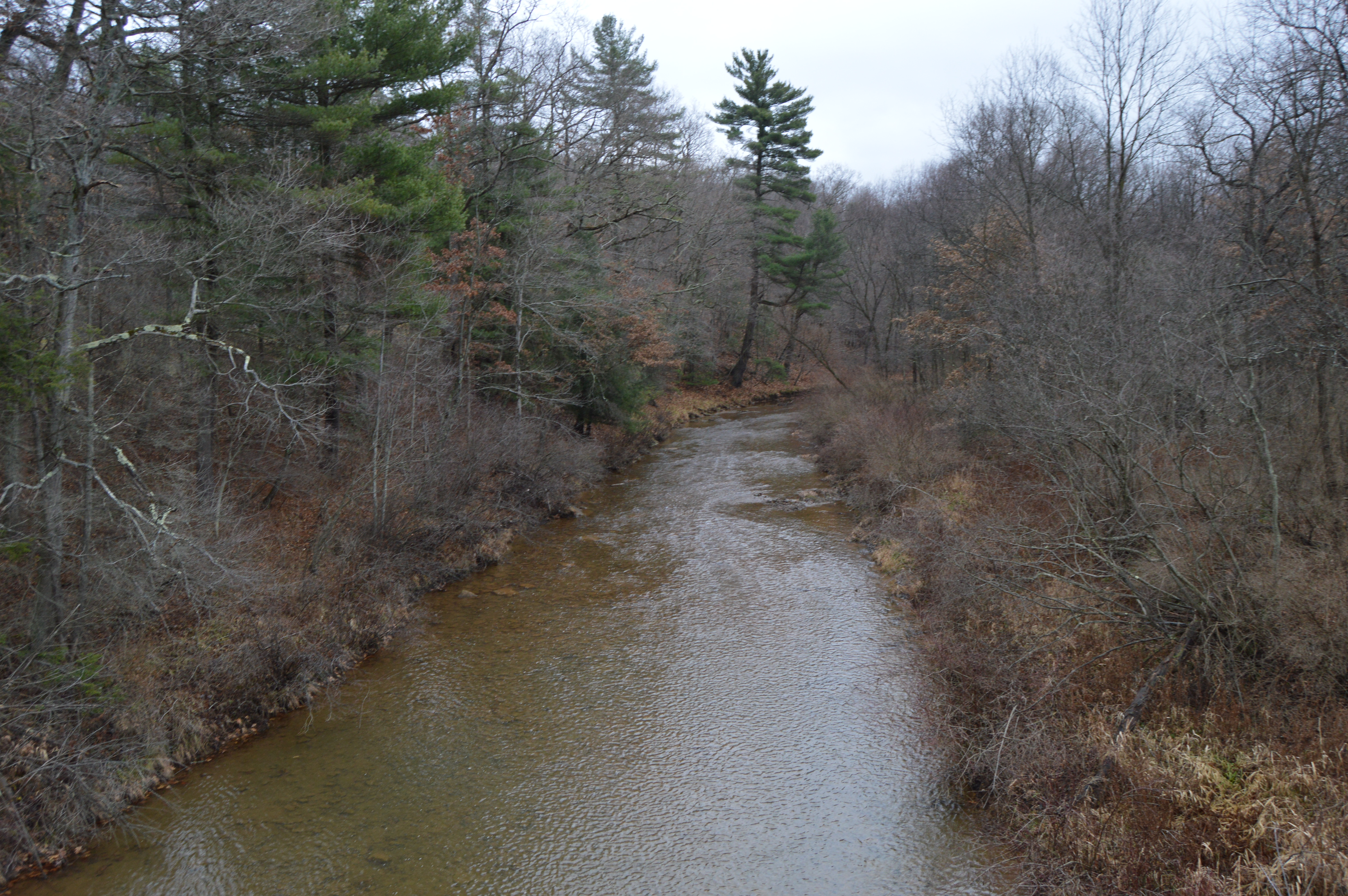
- Piney Creek east of Reidsburg

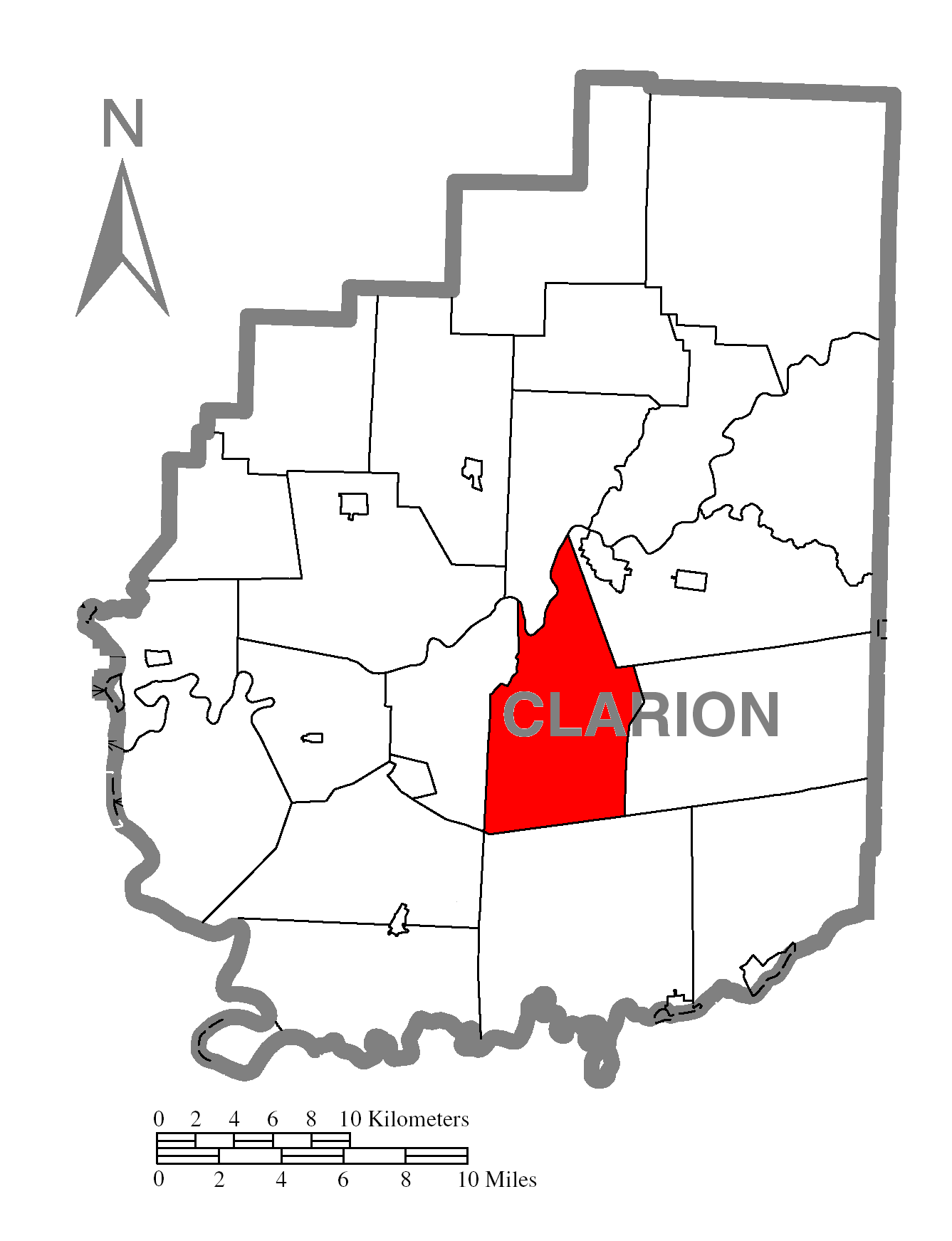
- Map of Clarion County, Pennsylvania highlighting Monroe Township

- Map of Clarion County, Pennsylvania
- Country: United States
- State: Pennsylvania
- County: Clarion
- Settled: 1800
- Incorporated: 1832

Government
  - Type: Board of Supervisors
  - Supervisors Chair: Walter D. Shook
  - Supervisor: Donald E. Montogomery
  - Supervisor: Robert J. Lewis

Area
  - Total: 29.85 sq mi (77.32 km^{2})
  - Land: 29.45 sq mi (76.28 km^{2})
  - Water: 0.40 sq mi (1.04 km^{2})

Population (2020)
  - Total: 1,496 ▼
  - Estimate (2022): 1,481
  - Density: 50.79/sq mi (19.61/km^{2})
- Time zone: UTC-5 (Eastern (EST))
  - Summer (DST): UTC-4 (EDT)
- FIPS code: 42-031-50464
- Website: https://www.monroetownshipclarioncounty.com/

Monroe Township is a township in Clarion County, Pennsylvania, United States. As of the 2020 census, the township had a population of 1,496, a decrease from the figure of 1,544 tabulated in 2010.

== Geography ==
The township is near the center of Clarion County and is bordered on the north by the Clarion River. Piney Creek, a tributary of the Clarion, crosses the northern part of the township and passes through unincorporated Reidsburg, the largest settlement in the township. According to the United States Census Bureau, the township has a total area of 29.8 square miles (77.3 km^{2}), of which 29.5 square miles (76.3 km^{2}) is land and 0.39 square miles (1.0 km^{2}), or 1.35%, is water.

== Demographics ==
Historical population
Census	Pop.	Note	%±
2010	1,544		—
2020	1,496		−3.1%
2022 (est.)	1,481		−1.0%
U.S. Decennial Census

As of the census of 2000, there were 1,587 people, 595 households, and 427 families residing in the township. The population density was 53.9 people per square mile (20.8 people/km^{2}). There were 648 housing units at an average density of 22.0 per square mile (8.5/km^{2}). The racial makeup of the township was 99.31% White, 0.13% Native American, 0.13% Asian, 0.13% from other races, and 0.32% from two or more races. Hispanic or Latino of any race were 0.38% of the population.

There were 595 households, out of which 30.8% had children under the age of 18 living with them, 62.7% were married couples living together, 7.2% had a female householder with no husband present, and 28.2% were non-families. 18.7% of all households were made up of individuals, and 7.9% had someone living alone who was 65 years of age or older. The average household size was 2.59 and the average family size was 3.00.

In the township the population was spread out, with 24.4% under the age of 18, 13.4% from 18 to 24, 25.5% from 25 to 44, 24.4% from 45 to 64, and 12.2% who were 65 years of age or older. The median age was 37 years. For every 100 females there were 96.7 males. For every 100 females age 18 and over, there were 95.0 males.

The median income for a household in the township was $38,125, and the median income for a family was $45,329. Males had a median income of $32,083 versus $19,375 for females. The per capita income for the township was $19,455. About 5.3% of families and 10.3% of the population were below the poverty line, including 5.9% of those under age 18 and 9.1% of those age 65 or over.
