= Ridgway Armory =

- U.S. National Register of Historic Places
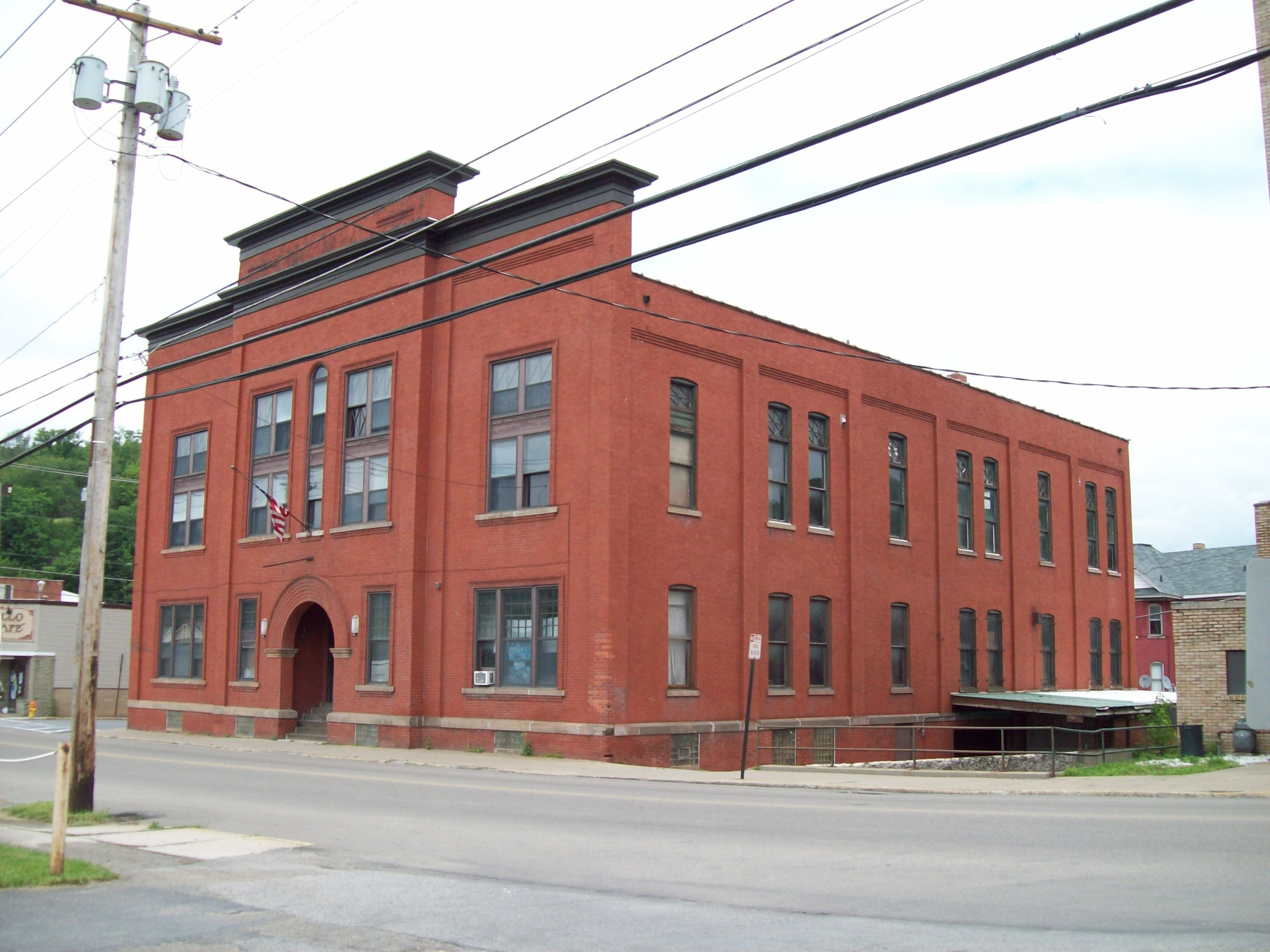
- Ridgway Armory, June 2009

- Location within Pennsylvania Location within the United States
- Location: 72 N. Broad St., Ridgway, Pennsylvania
- Coordinates: 41°25′24″N 78°43′48″W
- Area: 0.2 acres (0.081 ha)
- Built: 1904
- Architectural style: Romanesque
- MPS: Pennsylvania National Guard Armories MPS
- NRHP reference No.: 89002078
- Added to NRHP: December 22, 1989

The Ridgway Armory is an historic National Guard armory that is located in Ridgway, Elk County, Pennsylvania.

It was added to the National Register of Historic Places in 1989.

== History and architectural features ==
Built in 1904, this historic structure is a 2 1/2-story, rectangular, brick building that was designed in the Romanesque Revival style. The drill hall is located on the second floor, above the administration area.

The building has since been unused and is largely vacant and has had renovations to upkeep the wall on the right side of the building to avoid collapsing into the river. It is located adjacent to a YMCA, which was built in a similar style.
