= O.B. Grant House =

Historic house in Pennsylvania, United States

- U.S. National Register of Historic Places
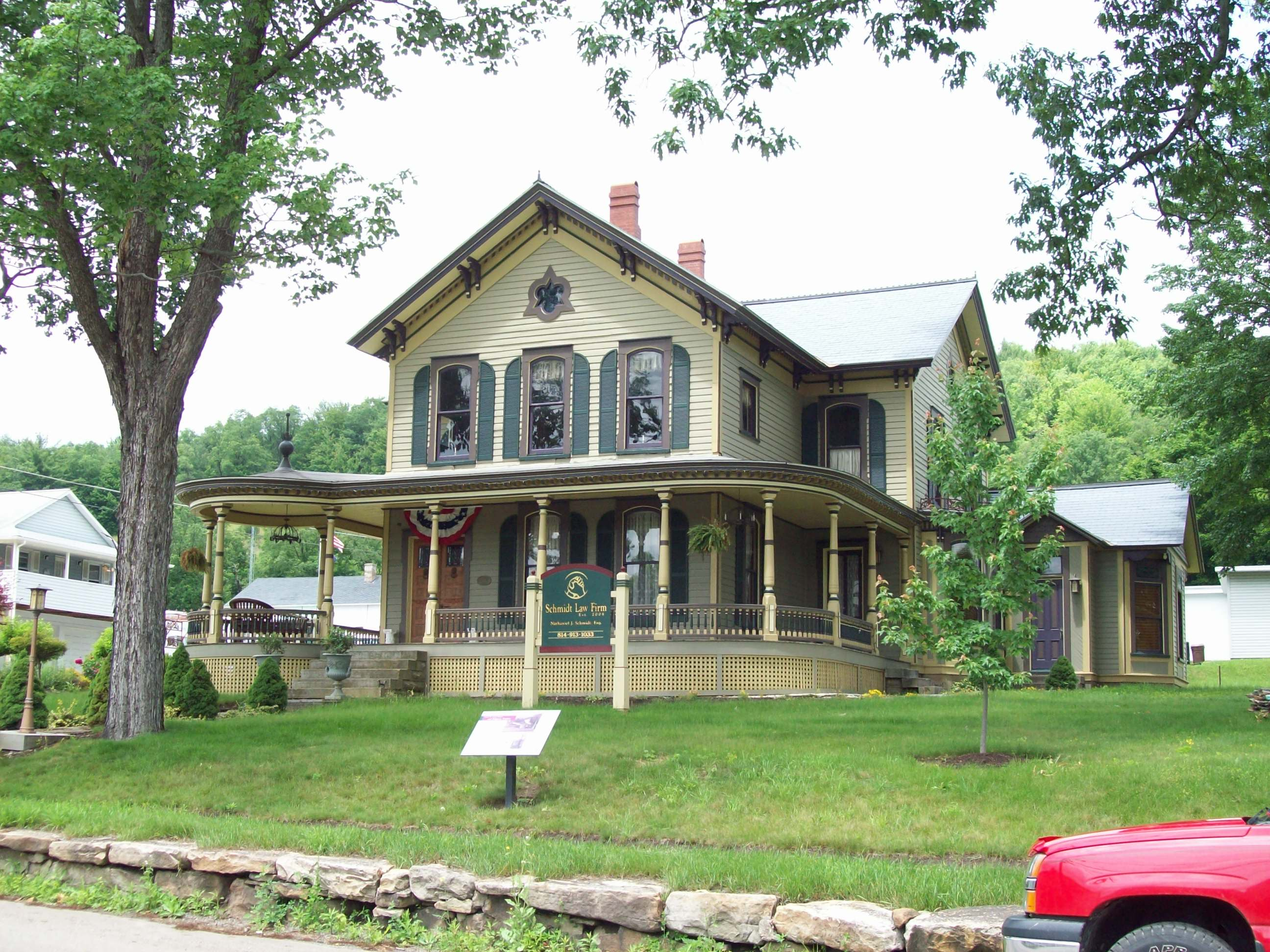
- O.B. Grant House, June 2009

- Location within Pennsylvania Location within the United States
- Location: 610 W. Main St., Ridgway Township, Pennsylvania
- Coordinates: 41°25′17″N 78°44′57″W
- Area: less than one acre
- Built: 1870
- Architect: Hyde-Murphy Company
- Architectural style: Italianate
- NRHP reference No.: 04000268
- Added to NRHP: April 5, 2004

O.B. Grant House is a historic home located at Ridgway in Elk County, Pennsylvania. It was built in 1870 in the Italianate style. It is a two-story, balloon-frame dwelling resting on a stone foundation and capped by an intersecting gable roof.

It was added to the National Register of Historic Places in 2004.
