= St. Marys Historic District (St. Marys, Pennsylvania) =

Historic district in Pennsylvania, United States

- U.S. National Register of Historic Places
- U.S. Historic district
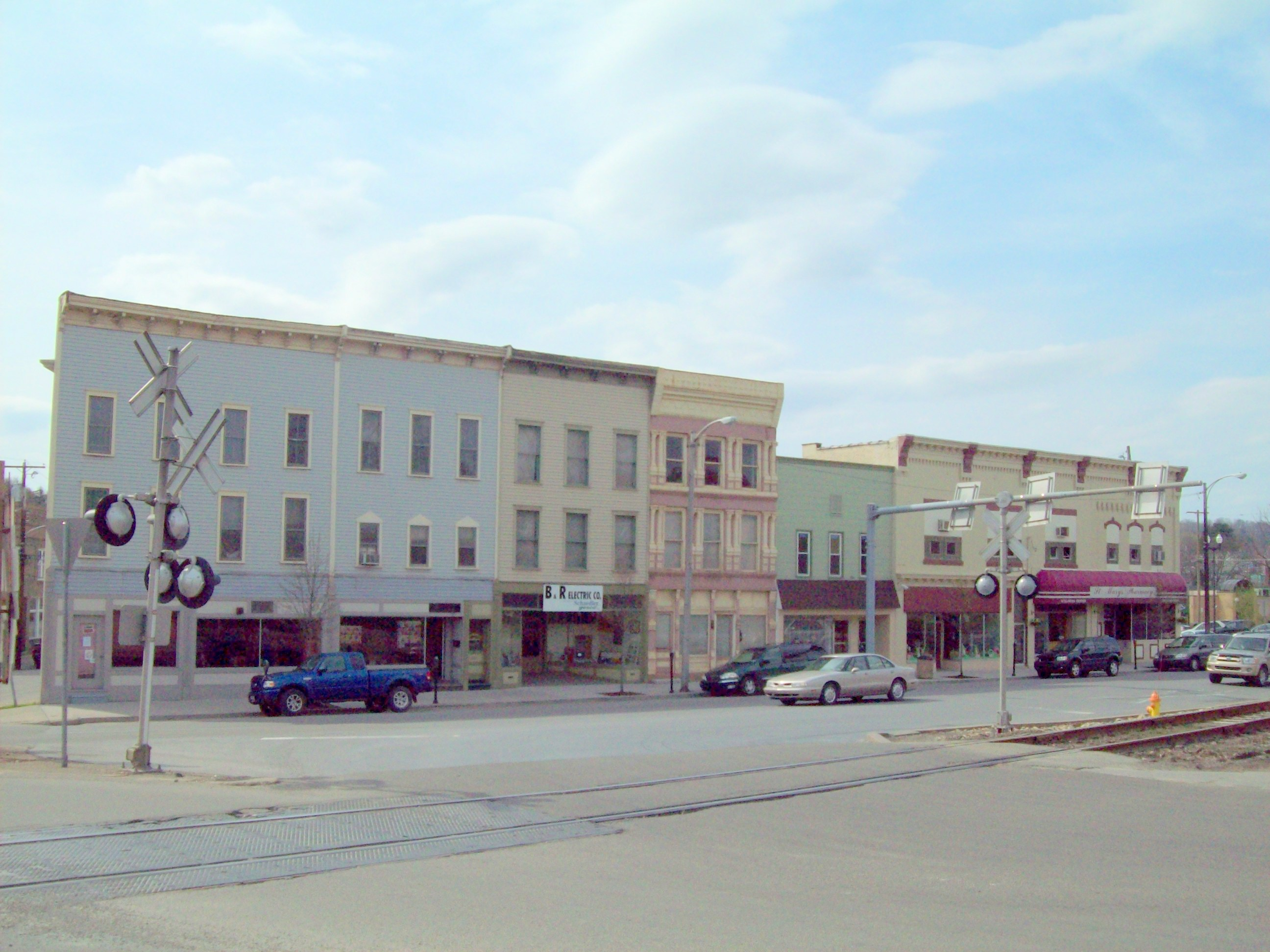
- St. Marys Historic District, April 2010

- Location within Pennsylvania Location within the United States
- Location: Roughly bounded by Walburga, St. Michael, Fourth, John, and Mill Sts., St. Marys, Pennsylvania
- Coordinates: 41°25′43″N 78°33′49″W
- Area: 170 acres (69 ha)
- Built: 1842
- Architect: Hyde-Murphy Co.; et al.
- Architectural style: Italianate, Gothic Revival, Romanesque
- NRHP reference No.: 98001368
- Added to NRHP: November 25, 1998

St. Marys Historic District is a national historic district located at St. Marys in Elk County, Pennsylvania. It includes 399 contributing buildings, two contributing sites, one contributing structure, and five contributing objects. It encompasses the historic central business district, adjacent residential district, and St. Joseph's Convent. Also located in the district are several historic churches. The oldest building in the district is a stone structure built about 1845. The earliest section is oriented around the "Diamond." Located within the district is the separately listed John E. Weidenboerner House. Also located in the district are two buildings designed by architect William P. Ginther; the Sacred Heart Church (1906-1907) and the addition to St. Joseph's Convent (1907).

It was added to the National Register of Historic Places in 1998.

== Gallery ==
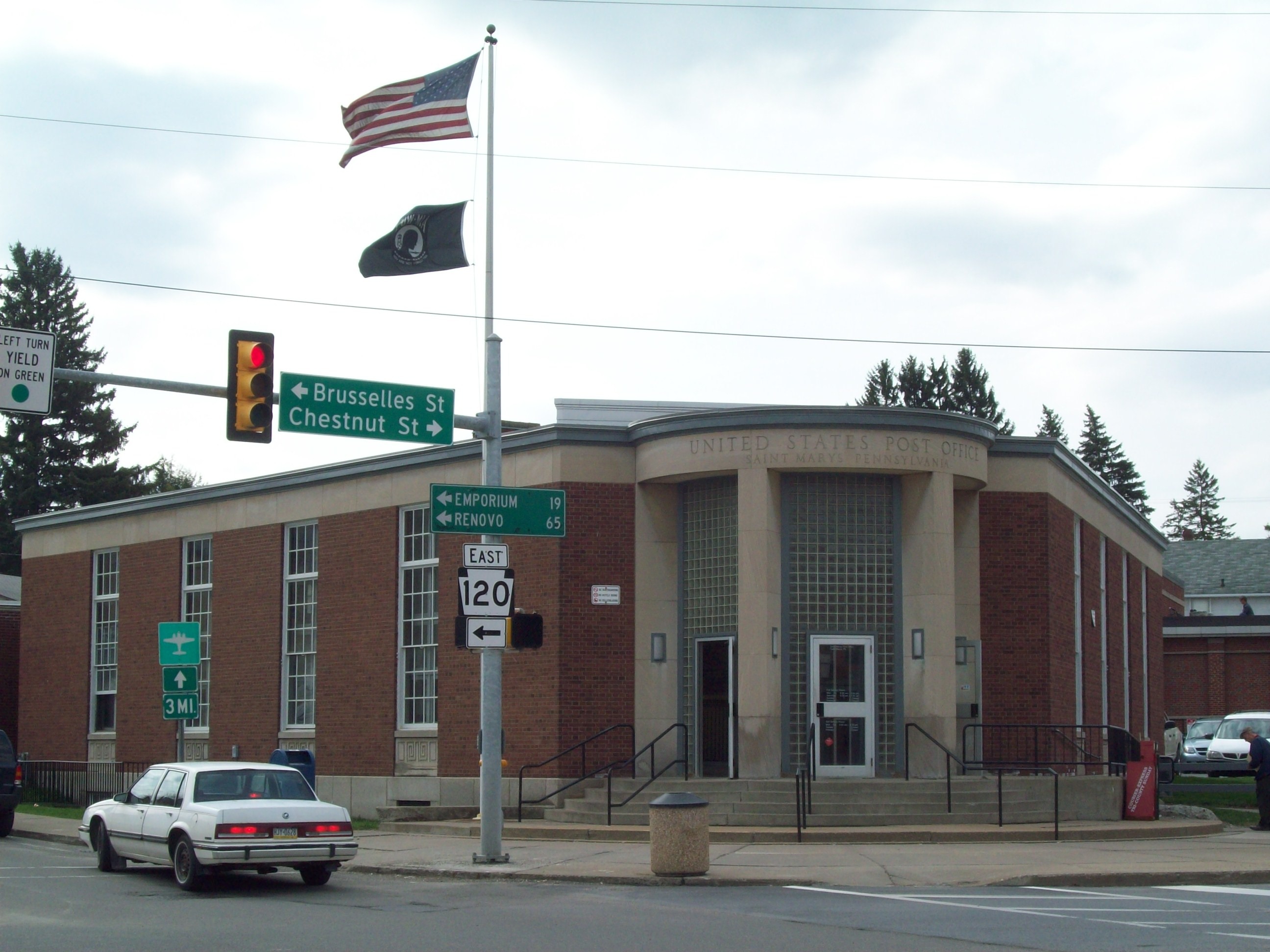
U.S. Post Office, April 2010
