= Ridgway, Pennsylvania =

Borough in Pennsylvania, US

- Borough
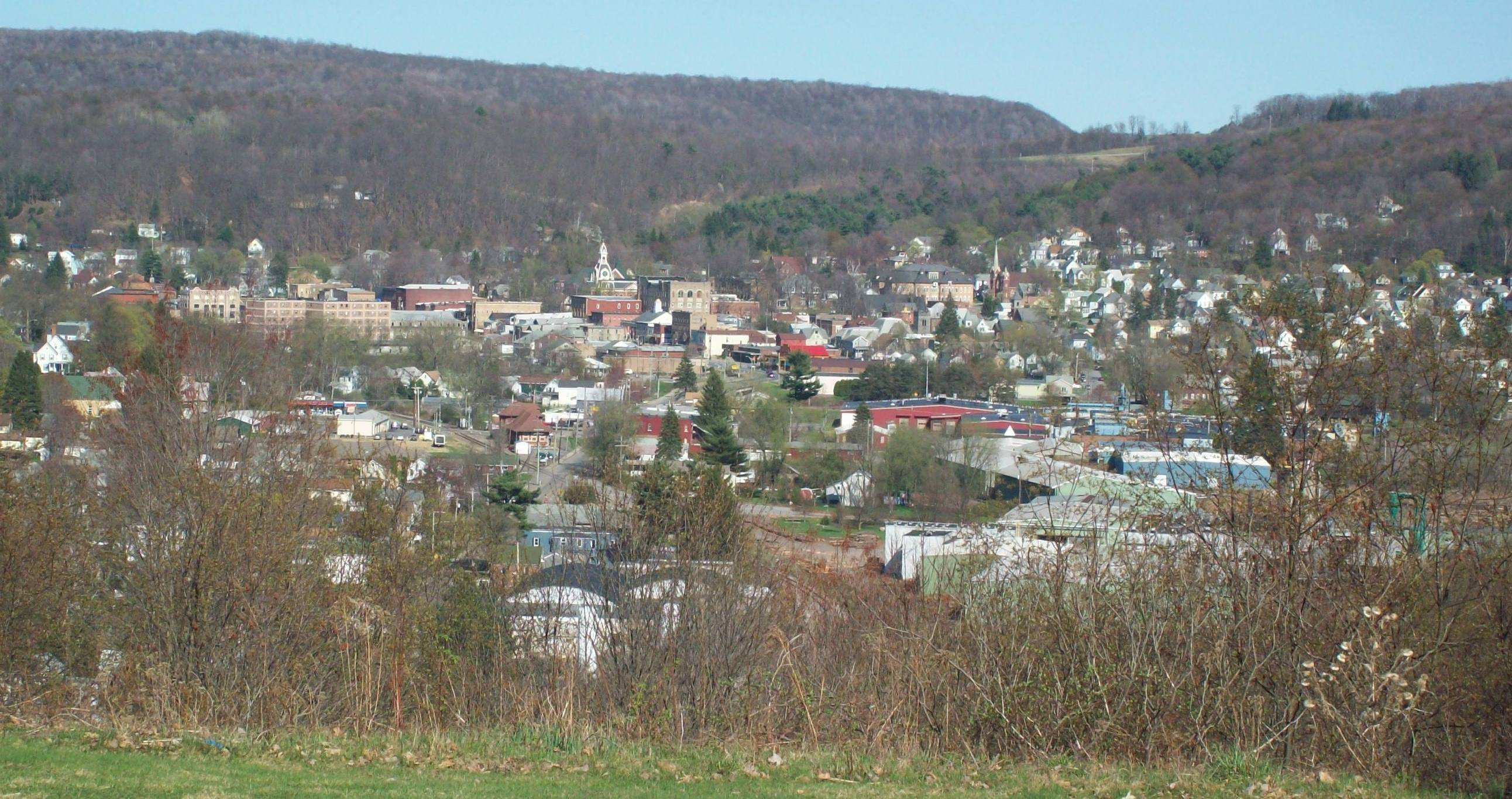
- Ridgway from Elk County Country Club, April 2010

- Seal

- Location in Elk County and the U.S. state of Pennsylvania.
- Coordinates: 41°25′29″N 78°43′47″W
- Country: United States
- State: Pennsylvania
- County: Elk
- Settled: 1824
- Incorporated: 1880

Government
  - Type: Borough Council
  - Mayor: Raymond Imhof

Area
  - Total: 2.67 sq mi (6.91 km^{2})
  - Land: 2.61 sq mi (6.77 km^{2})
  - Water: 0.054 sq mi (0.14 km^{2})
- Elevation: 1,381 ft (421 m)

Population (2020)
  - Total: 4,039
  - Density: 1,546.2/sq mi (596.98/km^{2})
- Time zone: UTC-5 (Eastern (EST))
  - Summer (DST): UTC-4 (EDT)
- ZIP code: 15853
- Area code: 814
- FIPS code: 42-64784
- Website: ridgwayborough.com

Ridgway is a borough in and the county seat of Elk County, Pennsylvania. As of the 2020 census it had a population of 4,039

== History ==
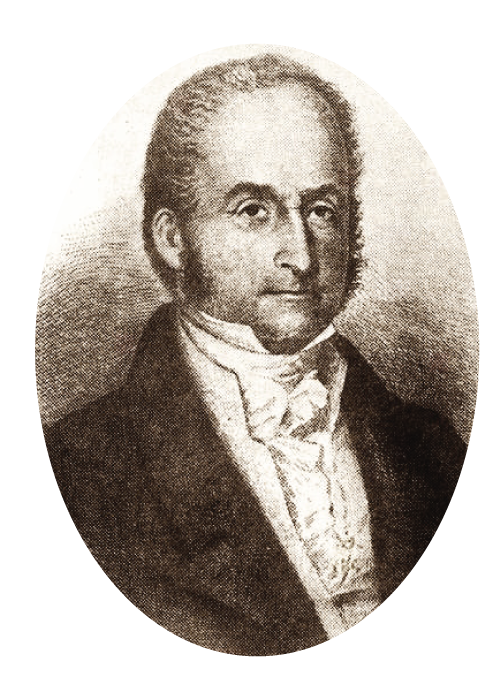
Ridgway is named for the Philadelphia shipping merchant, Jacob Ridgway.

Ridgway was founded by Philadelphian shipping merchant Jacob Ridgway and James Gillis. Jacob Ridgway earned substantial wealth both in Philadelphia and abroad in London. He constantly sent sums of money back to be invested in property. In the early 19th century as part of a larger land purchase, Ridgway acquired 40,000 acres (160 km^{2}) that became Elk County. One of Jacob Ridgway's nephews by marriage, James Gillis, convinced Ridgway that the area could become a very lucrative spot for a lumber camp due to the proximity of Elk Creek and the Clarion River, a tributary of the Allegheny River. Coal and natural gas abound in the district. In the past, the industrial interests were manufacturing leather, iron, clay, and lumber products, silk goods, railroad snow plows, dynamos, and machine tools. In 1900, the people living here numbered 3,515; in 1910, 5,408; in 1940, 6,253, and in 2010, 4,078.

Many historic structures are located within the boundaries of the Ridgway Historic District, added to the National Register of Historic Places in 2003. The O.B. Grant House and Ridgway Armory are also listed on the National Register of Historic Places.

The lumber industry continued to flourish in Ridgway, to the degree that around the start of the 20th century, the town claimed it had more millionaires per capita than any other town in the U.S.

== Geography ==
Ridgway is located in central Elk County at 41°25′29″N 78°43′47″W (41.424739, -78.729733). It is surrounded by Ridgway Township.

The borough is in the valley of the Clarion River, where it is joined from the east by Elk Creek. U.S. Route 219 passes through the borough center, leading north 44 miles (71 km) to Bradford and south 28 miles (45 km) to DuBois.

According to the United States Census Bureau, the borough has a total area of 2.67 square miles (6.91 km^{2}), of which 2.61 square miles (6.77 km^{2}) is land and 0.054 square miles (0.14 km^{2}), or 2.07%, is water.

== Media ==
- Ridgway Hometown News (weekly)

Climate data for Ridgway, Pennsylvania (1991–2020 normals, extremes 1913–present)
Month	Jan	Feb	Mar	Apr	May	Jun	Jul	Aug	Sep	Oct	Nov	Dec	Year
Record high °F (°C)	72 (22)	74 (23)	82 (28)	92 (33)	97 (36)	106 (41)	110 (43)	101 (38)	103 (39)	91 (33)	80 (27)	73 (23)	110 (43)
Mean daily maximum °F (°C)	33.7 (0.9)	36.5 (2.5)	45.4 (7.4)	58.9 (14.9)	70.1 (21.2)	77.4 (25.2)	81.2 (27.3)	80.1 (26.7)	73.6 (23.1)	61.6 (16.4)	49.0 (9.4)	38.3 (3.5)	58.8 (14.9)
Daily mean °F (°C)	24.9 (−3.9)	26.5 (−3.1)	34.3 (1.3)	45.9 (7.7)	56.7 (13.7)	64.9 (18.3)	68.8 (20.4)	67.7 (19.8)	61.2 (16.2)	49.9 (9.9)	39.3 (4.1)	30.5 (−0.8)	47.5 (8.6)
Mean daily minimum °F (°C)	16.2 (−8.8)	16.5 (−8.6)	23.2 (−4.9)	32.9 (0.5)	43.3 (6.3)	52.4 (11.3)	56.5 (13.6)	55.3 (12.9)	48.8 (9.3)	38.2 (3.4)	29.6 (−1.3)	22.7 (−5.2)	36.3 (2.4)
Record low °F (°C)	−31 (−35)	−35 (−37)	−23 (−31)	−1 (−18)	17 (−8)	27 (−3)	34 (1)	26 (−3)	22 (−6)	11 (−12)	−10 (−23)	−24 (−31)	−35 (−37)
Average precipitation inches (mm)	3.44 (87)	2.67 (68)	3.41 (87)	3.89 (99)	4.32 (110)	4.62 (117)	4.57 (116)	3.90 (99)	4.03 (102)	3.76 (96)	3.49 (89)	3.45 (88)	45.55 (1,157)
Average snowfall inches (cm)	15.3 (39)	12.5 (32)	7.5 (19)	1.5 (3.8)	0.0 (0.0)	0.0 (0.0)	0.0 (0.0)	0.0 (0.0)	0.0 (0.0)	0.4 (1.0)	3.2 (8.1)	12.3 (31)	52.7 (134)
Average precipitation days (≥ 0.01 in)	17.4	14.0	13.7	14.0	14.4	13.7	12.2	11.1	11.3	14.0	13.1	16.7	165.6
Average snowy days (≥ 0.1 in)	9.8	7.6	4.5	1.2	0.0	0.0	0.0	0.0	0.0	0.3	2.1	6.4	31.9
Source: NOAA

== Demographics ==
Historical population
Census	Pop.	Note	%±
1880	1,100		—
1890	1,903		73.0%
1900	3,515		84.7%
1910	5,408		53.9%
1920	6,037		11.6%
1930	6,313		4.6%
1940	6,253		−1.0%
1950	6,244		−0.1%
1960	6,387		2.3%
1970	6,022		−5.7%
1980	5,604		−6.9%
1990	4,793		−14.5%
2000	4,591		−4.2%
2010	4,078		−11.2%
2020	4,039		−1.0%

=== 2020 census ===
As of the 2020 census, Ridgway had a population of 4,039. The median age was 43.2 years. 21.5% of residents were under the age of 18 and 20.0% of residents were 65 years of age or older. For every 100 females there were 99.2 males, and for every 100 females age 18 and over there were 96.2 males age 18 and over.

97.2% of residents lived in urban areas, while 2.8% lived in rural areas.

There were 1,775 households in Ridgway, of which 24.9% had children under the age of 18 living in them. Of all households, 41.0% were married-couple households, 21.8% were households with a male householder and no spouse or partner present, and 29.3% were households with a female householder and no spouse or partner present. About 35.5% of all households were made up of individuals and 14.5% had someone living alone who was 65 years of age or older.

There were 2,004 housing units, of which 11.4% were vacant. The homeowner vacancy rate was 2.4% and the rental vacancy rate was 9.2%.

Racial composition as of the 2020 census
Race	Number	Percent
White	3,818	94.5%
Black or African American	20	0.5%
American Indian and Alaska Native	1	0.0%
Asian	22	0.5%
Native Hawaiian and Other Pacific Islander	0	0.0%
Some other race	10	0.2%
Two or more races	168	4.2%
Hispanic or Latino (of any race)	34	0.8%

=== 2010 census ===
At the 2010 census there were 4,078 people, 1,783 households, and 1,073 families living in the borough. The population density was 1,568.5 inhabitants per square mile (605.6/km^{2}). There were 2,068 housing units at an average density of 795.4 units per square mile (307.1 units/km^{2}). The racial makeup of the borough was 97.7% White, 0.6% African American, 0.1% Native American, 0.6% Asian, 0.1% from other races, and 0.9% from two or more races. Hispanic or Latino of any race were 0.6%.

There were 1,783 households, 26.1% had children under the age of 18 living with them, 45.3% were married couples living together, 9.8% had a female householder with no husband present, and 39.8% were non-families. 35.3% of households were made up of individuals, and 15.1% were one person aged 65 or older. The average household size was 2.25 and the average family size was 2.91.

The age distribution was 22.8% under the age of 18, 59.9% from 18 to 64, and 17.3% 65 or older. The median age was 43 years.

The median household income was $37,917 and the median family income was $47,969. Males had a median income of $34,629 versus $28,750 for females. The per capita income for the borough was $22,415. About 17.5% of families and 18.1% of the population were below the poverty line, including 39.3% of those under age 18 and 7.2% of those age 65 or over.

=== 2000 census ===
At the 2000 census there were 4,591 people, 1,927 households, and 1,233 families living in the borough. The population density was 1,722.7 inhabitants per square mile (665.1/km^{2}). There were 2,089 housing units at an average density of 783.8 units per square mile (302.6 units/km^{2}). The racial makeup of the borough was 98.54% White, 0.17% African American, 0.04% Native American, 0.70% Asian, 0.17% from other races, and 0.37% from two or more races. Hispanic or Latino of any race were 0.52%.

There were 1,927 households, 28.4% had children under the age of 18 living with them, 50.1% were married couples living together, 9.7% had a female householder with no husband present, and 36.0% were non-families. 31.7% of households were made up of individuals, and 16.8% were one person aged 65 or older. The average household size was 2.33 and the average family size was 2.94.

The age distribution was 22.9% under the age of 18, 8.2% from 18 to 24, 27.8% from 25 to 44, 22.8% from 45 to 64, and 18.3% 65 or older. The median age was 40 years. For every 100 females there were 91.2 males. For every 100 females age 18 and over, there were 89.3 males.

The median household income was $33,141 and the median family income was $45,224. Males had a median income of $31,855 versus $21,296 for females. The per capita income for the borough was $17,157. About 4.9% of families and 6.1% of the population were below the poverty line, including 8.9% of those under age 18 and 2.3% of those age 65 or over.

== Art and culture ==
Ridgway is home to the Ridgway Chainsaw Carving Rendezvous, the largest chainsaw carving gathering of its kind. In the summer months, the Ridgway Volunteer Fire Department host their week-long celebration on their lot off North Broad Street. The Ridgway Heritage Council hosts the Tasting in the Wilds Festival, which is full of art, music, local wine tastings, and handcrafted brews.

The Elk County Council on the Arts (ECCOTA) has been serving the area with art experiences, education, and resources since 1984. ECCOTA operates a sales gallery in downtown Ridgway with artwork of all mediums from local artists.

== Recreation ==
The area serves as a gateway to the Allegheny National Forest, which provides outdoor recreation activities including ATV trails, horseback riding, camping and fishing. Ridgway has several bed and breakfasts, the Summit Fireside Lodge and Grill, and the oldest hotel in Elk County, the Royal Inn. The Wild and Scenic Clarion River hosts trophy trout fishing, an afternoon float and camping. The Little Toby-Clarion River Rail Trail trek runs 18 miles (29 km) to Brockway.

== Education ==
Ridgway houses two school systems in the borough and township. The Ridgway Area School District and St. Leo's Catholic School make up Ridgway's school systems.

=== Ridgway Area School District ===
Ridgway Area School District (RASD), has an elementary and a middle/high school building.

The Francis S. Grandinetti Elementary School is on Boot Jack Hill in Ridgway Township. IU9 preschool, kindergarten, 1st grade, 2nd grade, 3rd grade, 4th grade, and 5th grade are the grade levels available for students.

The Ridgway Area Middle/High School is at 1403 Hill Street in Ridgway. The middle school and high school students are on separate floors. The middle school, grades six through eight, are on the first floor. Students in high school, grades nine to twelve, are on the second floor.

The athletic team is known as the Elkers, a reference to Ridgway as the Elk County seat.

=== St. Leo's Catholic School ===
St. Leo's Catholic School has two buildings, a building for kindergarten students, and a main building, for children in grades 1–8. The kindergarten building is located just to the right of the main building. The preschool building is located to the left of the main building. The main building at St. Leo's educates children from grades 1–8. After completing 8th grade, students have the choice to transfer to public school (see above) or to transfer to Elk County Catholic High School, in St. Marys.

== Notable people ==
- Tom Brown, American football player.
- Kagney Linn Karter, pornographic film actress, was raised in St. Joseph, Missouri.
- Mary Elizabeth Lease, writer and political activist.
- Katherine Mayo, writer
- Billy Rhines, professional baseball player with the Cincinnati Reds, Louisville Colonels, and Pittsburgh Pirates.
- Emil Van Horn, actor and stunt man.
