= Lake City School =

- U.S. National Register of Historic Places
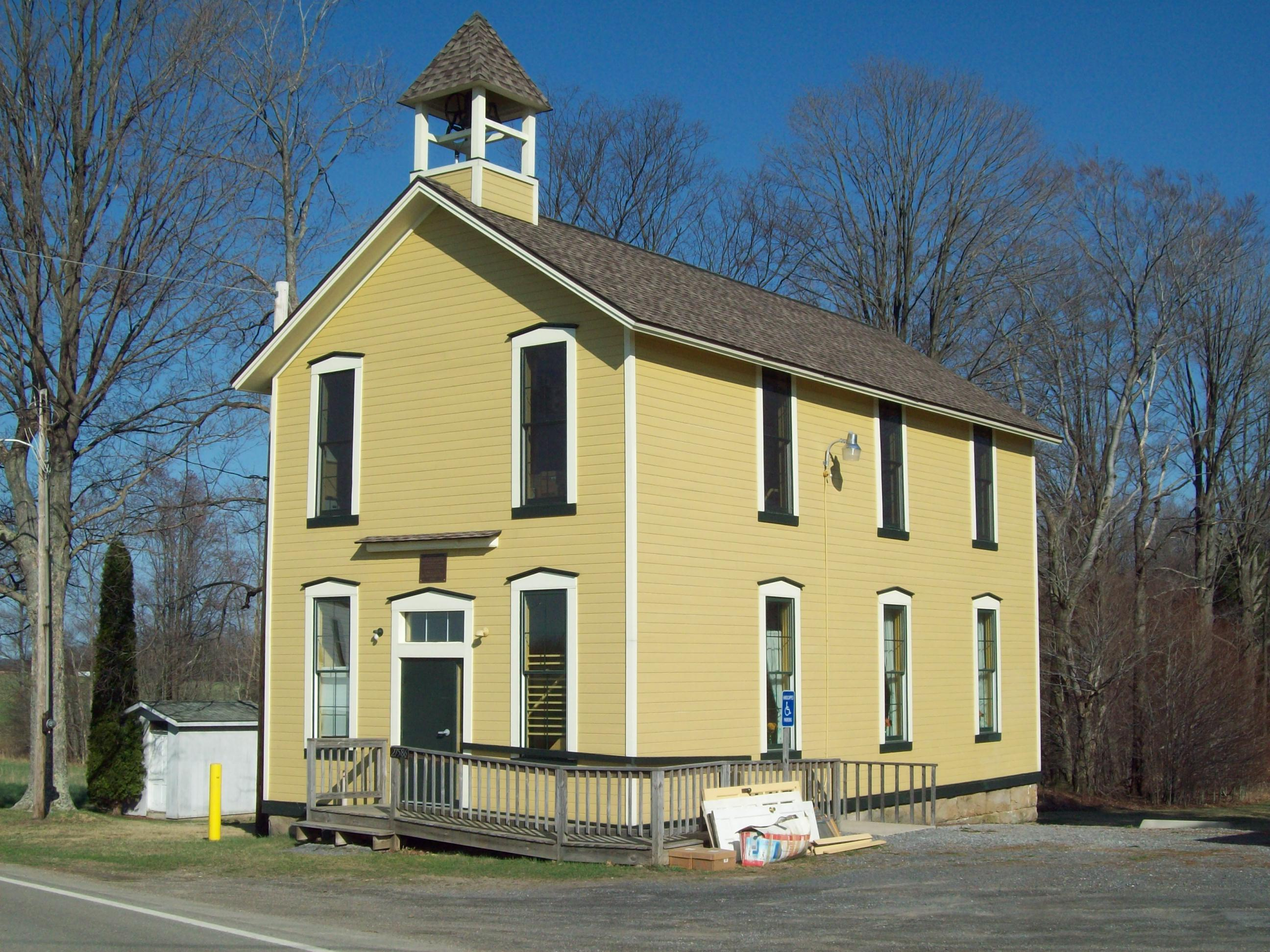
- Lake City School, April 2010

- Location within Pennsylvania Location within the United States
- Location: 27586 Lake City Rd., Spring Creek Township, Pennsylvania
- Coordinates: 41°21′54″N 78°53′07″W
- Area: less than one acre
- Built: 1889
- NRHP reference No.: 08000519
- Added to NRHP: June 6, 2008

The Lake City School, now known as the Lake City Community Center, is an historic school building in Spring Creek Township, Elk County, Pennsylvania, United States.

It was added to the National Register of Historic Places in 2008.

== History and architectural features ==
Built in 1889, this historic structure is a two-story, rectangular, frame, vernacular, building measuring 22 feet, 6 inches, by 42 feet, 6 inches. It sits on a sandstone foundation, and has a gable roof topped by a belfry that was rebuilt in 2004.
