= Johnsonburg Commercial Historic District =

Historic district in Pennsylvania, United States

- U.S. National Register of Historic Places
- U.S. Historic district
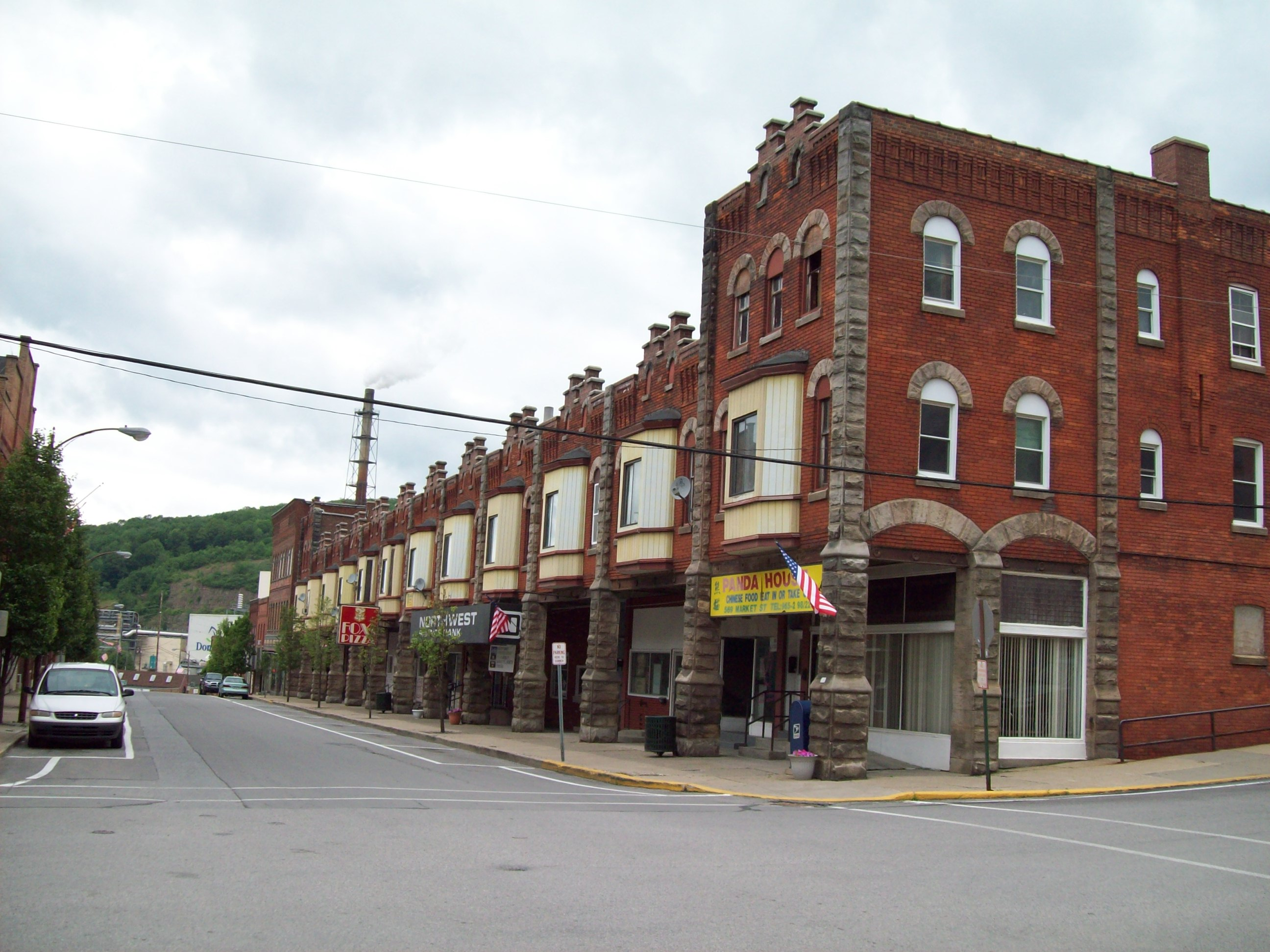
- Johnsonburg Commercial Historic District, June 2009

- Location within Pennsylvania Location within the United States
- Location: Roughly along Center, Bridge, and Market Sts., Johnsonburg, Pennsylvania
- Coordinates: 41°29′20″N 78°40′31″W
- Area: 6 acres (2.4 ha)
- Architect: Welsh, P.A.; et al.
- Architectural style: Late Victorian, Late 19th And 20th Century Revivals
- NRHP reference No.: 99001290
- Added to NRHP: October 28, 1999

The Johnsonburg Commercial Historic District is a national historic district that is located in Johnsonburg in Elk County, Pennsylvania.

It was added to the National Register of Historic Places in 1999.

== History and architectural features ==
This historic district includes thirty-two contributing buildings and one contributing object, and encompasses the historic central business district and includes a majority of brick structures most of which were built between the 1890s and 1930s. The most notable structure is the Anderson Brick Block, known locally as "the Brick Block" or "the Block." It was built during the 1890s and is a twelve-storefront brick structure behind a cantilevered sandstone arcade on the first story and a series of apartments above.
