= John E. Weidenboerner House =

Historic house in Pennsylvania, United States

- U.S. National Register of Historic Places
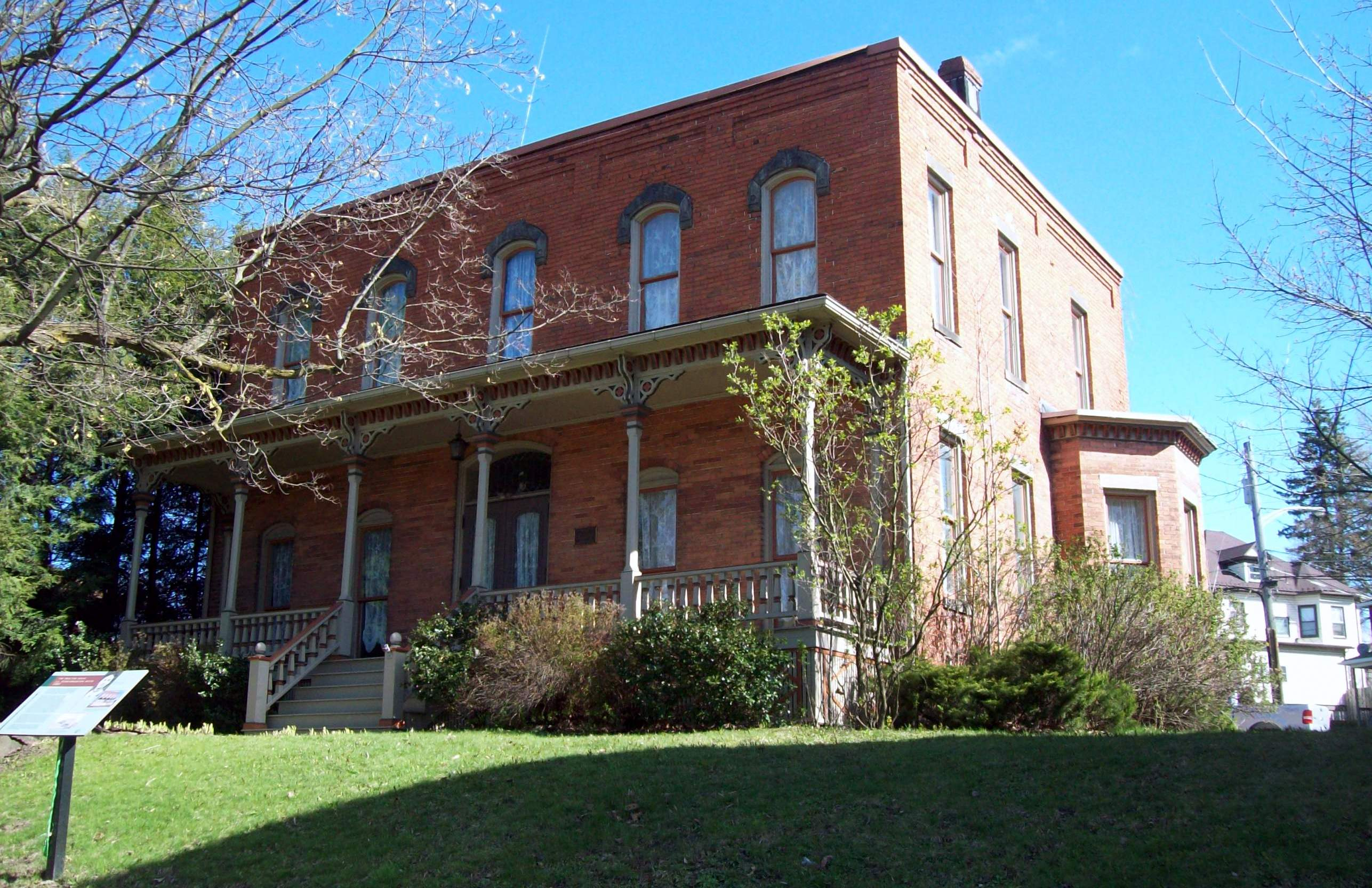
- John E. Weidenboerner House, April 2012

- Location within Pennsylvania Location within the United States
- Location: N. Michael St., St. Marys, Pennsylvania
- Coordinates: 41°25′45″N 78°33′45″W
- Area: less than one acre
- Built: 1881
- Architectural style: Italianate
- NRHP reference No.: 92000931
- Added to NRHP: July 24, 1992

John E. Weidenboerner House is a historic home located at St. Mary's in Elk County, Pennsylvania. It was built in 1881 in the Italianate style. It is located within the St. Marys Historic District.

It was added to the National Register of Historic Places in 1992.

== Gallery ==
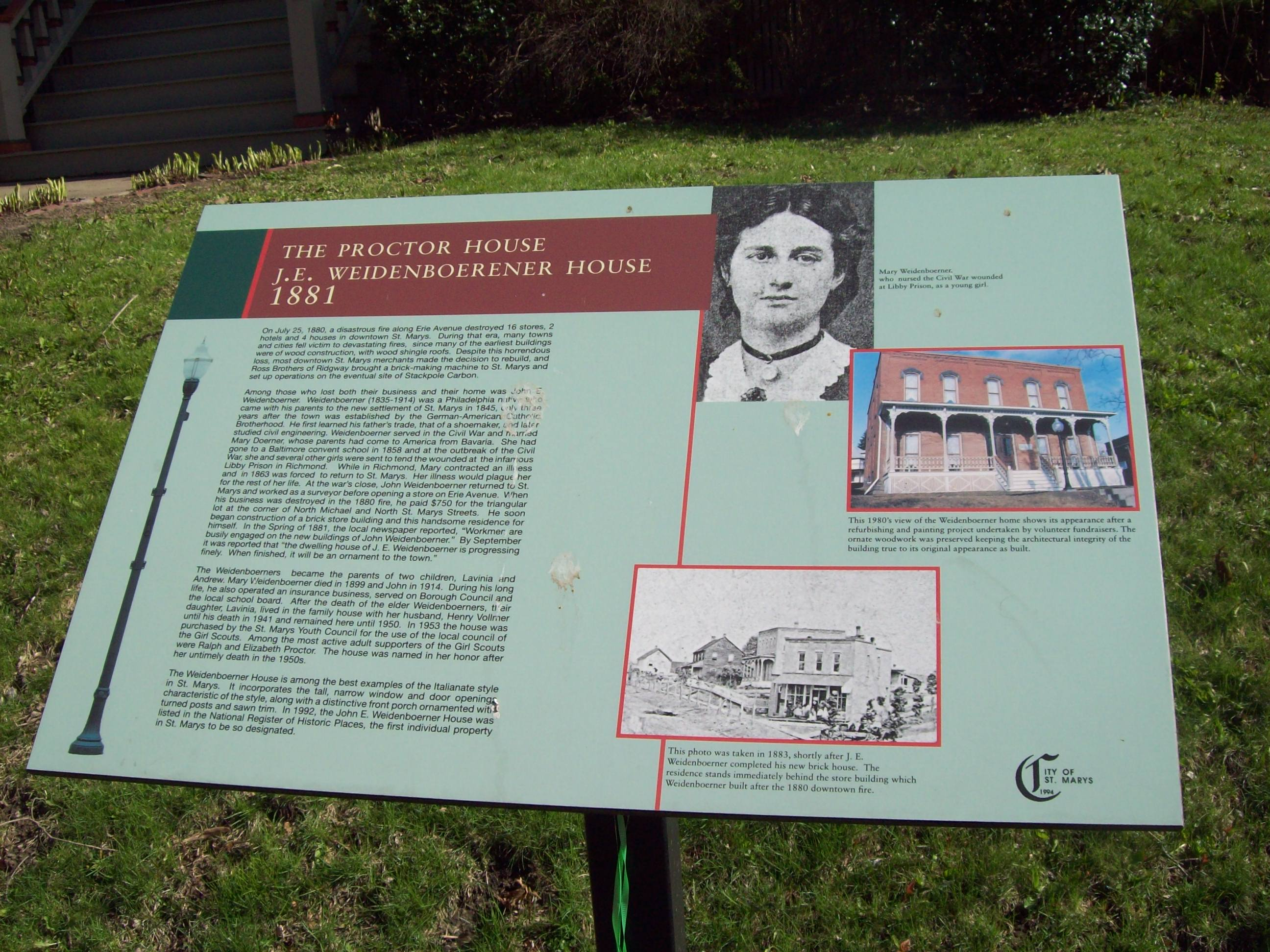
John E. Weidenboerner House, historic marker, April 2012
