= Bonifels =

Historic house in Pennsylvania, United States

- U.S. National Register of Historic Places
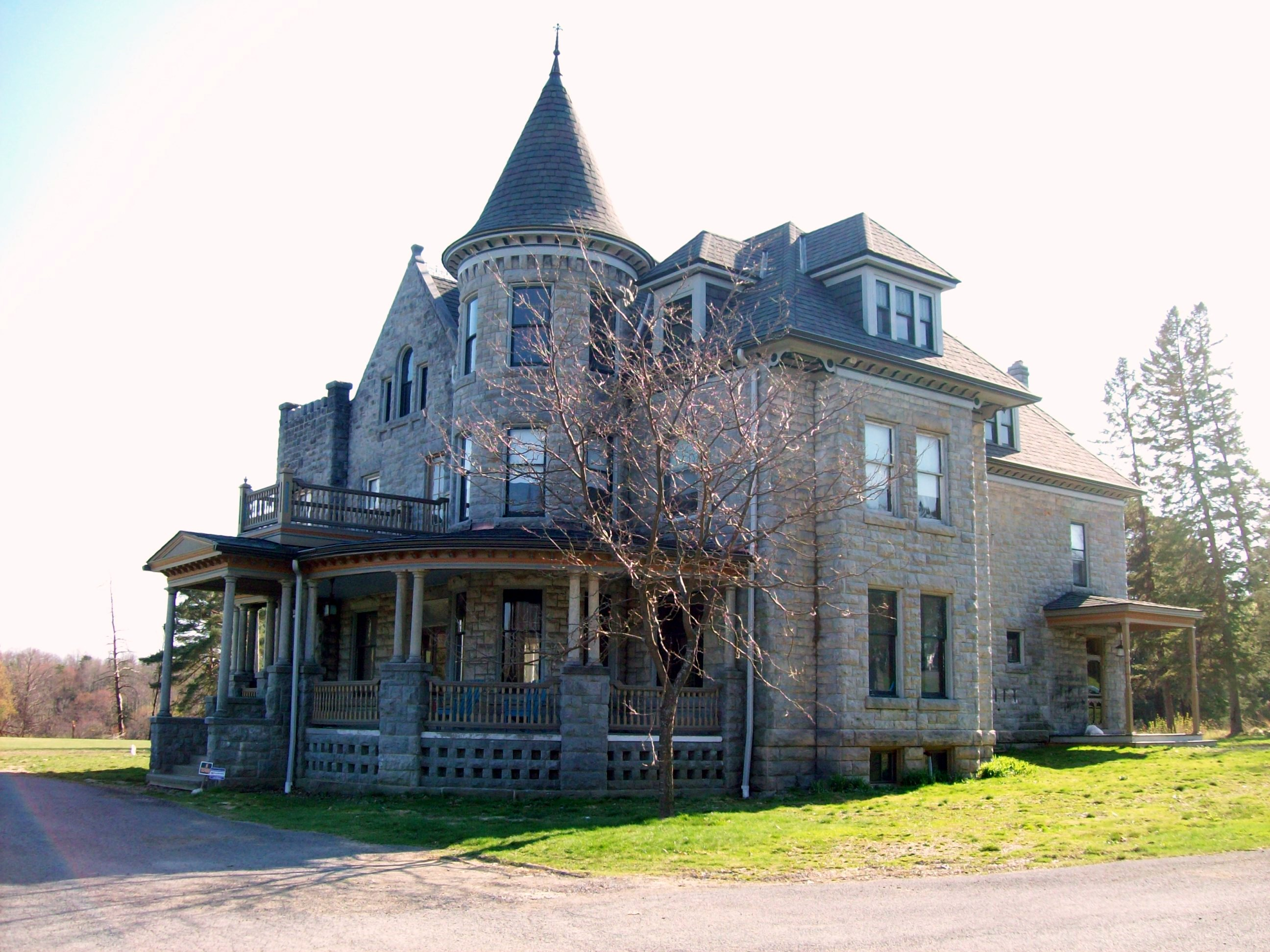
- Bonifels, April 2010

- Location within Pennsylvania Location within the United States
- Nearest city: Ridgway Township, Pennsylvania
- Coordinates: 41°25′11″N 78°45′17″W
- Area: 0.5 acres (0.20 ha)
- Built: 1898
- NRHP reference No.: 78002396
- Added to NRHP: December 14, 1978

Bonifels is a historic home located at Ridgway Township in Elk County, Pennsylvania. It was built in 1898 by N.T. Arnold and is a large 2 1/2-story, T-shaped stone mansion. It features hipped roofs with hipped-roofed dormers, a conical tower, and a crenellated stone tower. The entire home is faced in Vermont granite.

The farm and home were sold to create the Elk County Country Club in 1923. The castle was a useful club house until the 1970s when a modern building was erected further up the hill to be used as a restaurant, event space and modern kitchen.

The castle was later sold to different individuals over the years, some who could care for its many needs and some who could not. It has been abandoned on and off.

The home was restored in the early 2010s. The electrics and plumbing were updated, the walls repaired and papered in period styles. A modern kitchen was added.

The detailed woodwork and patterned hardwood flooring is a testimony to the lumber industry that grew Ridgway. The plaster molding and marble walls speak of the town's rich past.

Bonifels is a private home and still affords a view over town.

It was added to the National Register of Historic Places in 1978.
