= Piney Township, Pennsylvania =

Township in Pennsylvania, US

Coordinates: 41°08′49″N 79°28′42″W

- Township
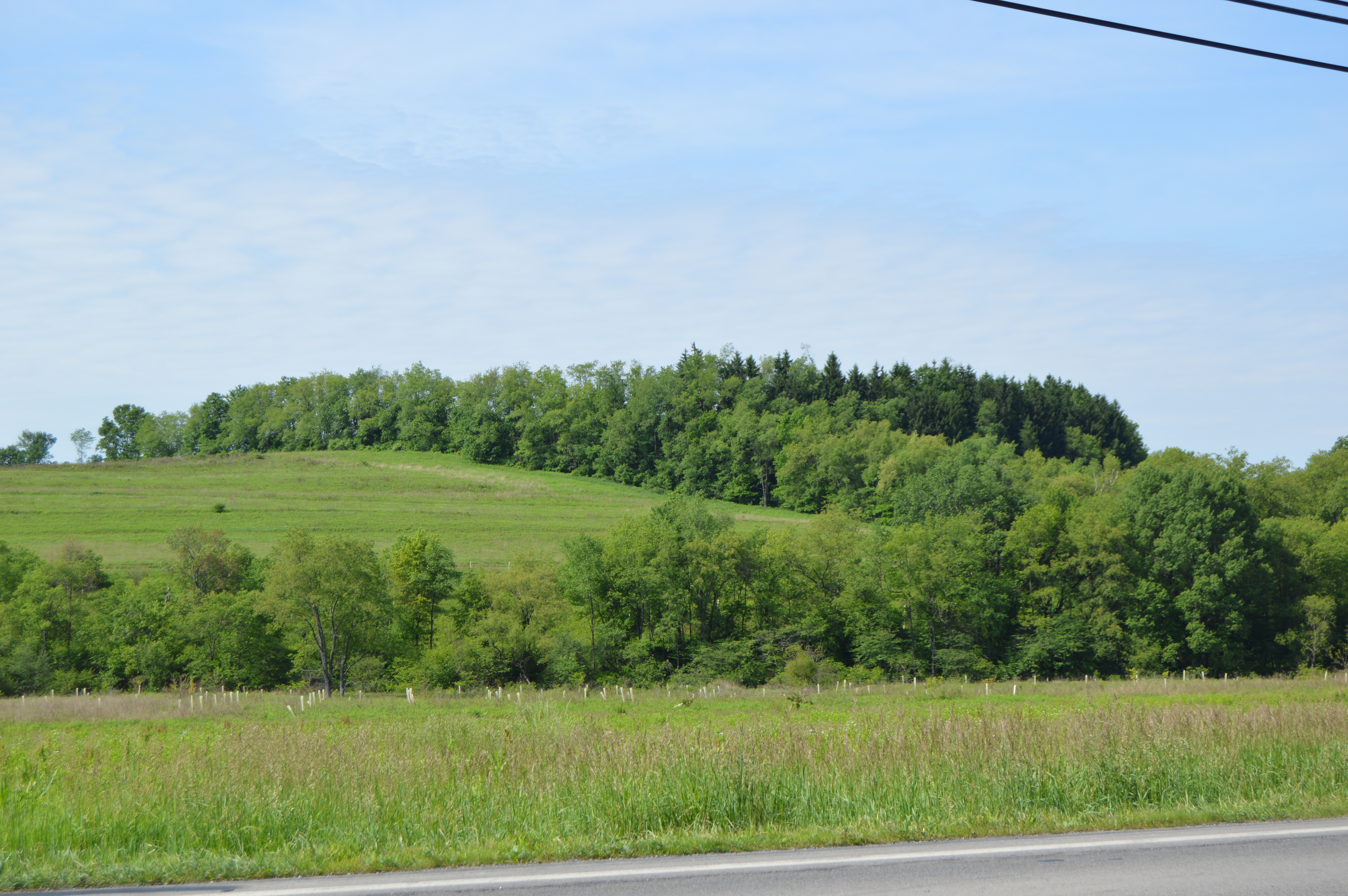
- Scene along Pennsylvania Route 68 east of Sligo

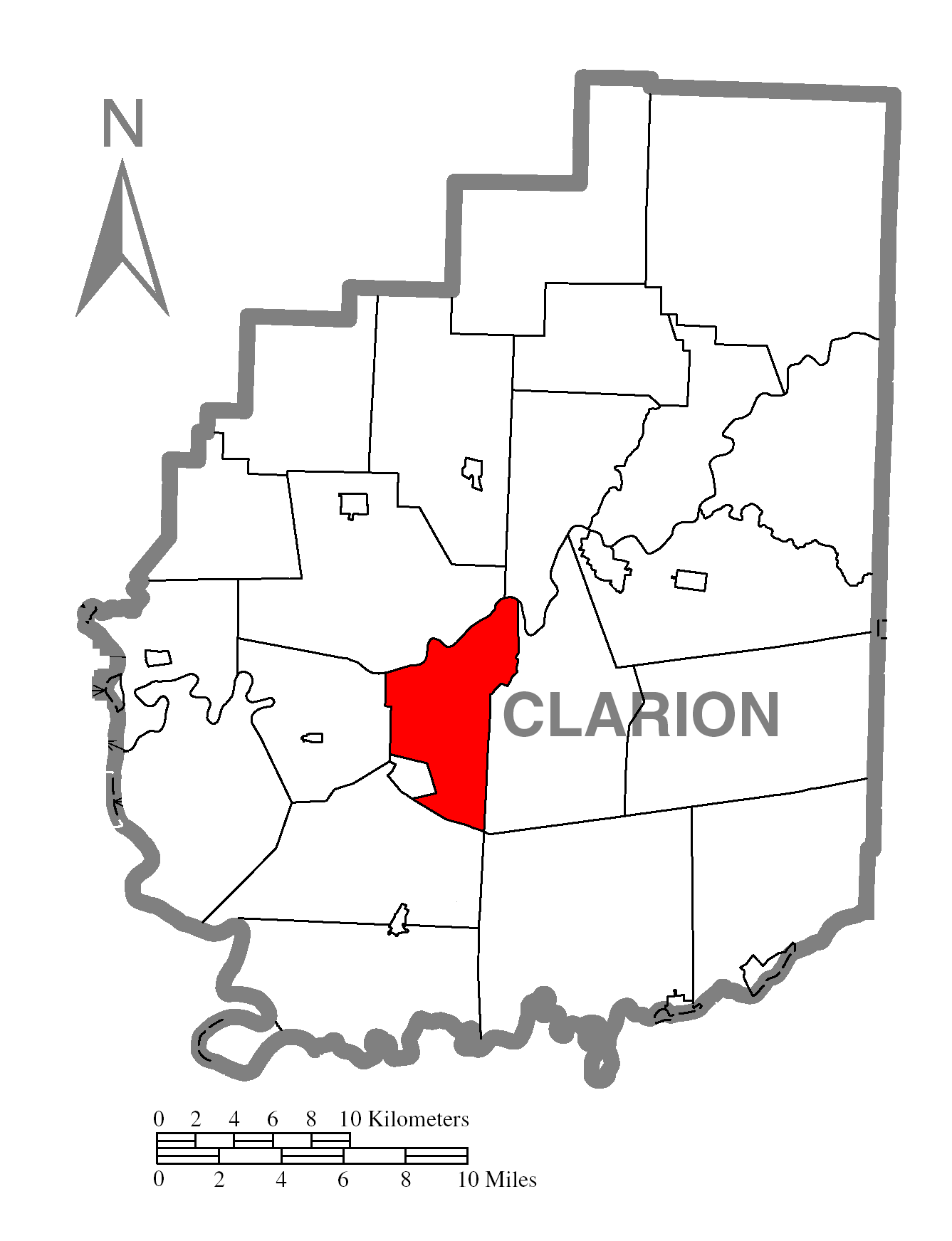
- Map of Clarion County, Pennsylvania highlighting Piney Township

- Map of Clarion County, Pennsylvania
- Country: United States
- State: Pennsylvania
- County: Clarion
- Settled: 1798

Area
  - Total: 17.98 sq mi (46.56 km^{2})
  - Land: 17.77 sq mi (46.02 km^{2})
  - Water: 0.21 sq mi (0.54 km^{2})

Population (2020)
  - Total: 402 ▼
  - Estimate (2022): 396
  - Density: 24.0/sq mi (9.28/km^{2})
- Time zone: UTC-5 (Eastern (EST))
  - Summer (DST): UTC-4 (EDT)
- FIPS code: 42-031-60648

Piney Township is a township that is located in Clarion County, Pennsylvania, United States. The population was 402 at the time of the 2020 census, a decrease from the figure of 453 that was tabulated in 2010.

== Geography ==
Piney Township is located just southwest of the center of Clarion County and is bordered to the north by the Clarion River and to the southwest by the borough of Sligo. Piney Creek flows across the northern corner of the township, into the Clarion River at the settlement of Piney.

According to the United States Census Bureau, the township has a total area of 18.0 square miles (46.6 km^{2}), of which 17.8 square miles (46.0 km^{2}) is land and 0.19 square miles (0.5 km^{2}), or 1.16%, is water.

== Demographics ==
Historical population
Census	Pop.	Note	%±
2010	453		—
2020	402		−11.3%
2022 (est.)	396		−1.5%
U.S. Decennial Census

As of the census of 2000, there were 516 people, 142 households, and 112 families residing in the township.

The population density was 29.0 people per square mile (11.2 people/km^{2}). There were 162 housing units at an average density of 9.1 per square mile (3.5/km^{2}).

The racial makeup of the township was 97.87% White, 1.16% Asian, 0.39% from other races, and 0.58% from two or more races. Hispanic or Latino of any race were 0.39% of the population.

There were 142 households, out of which 32.4% had children under the age of eighteen living with them; 64.8% were married couples living together, 7.7% had a female householder with no husband present, and 21.1% were non-families. 18.3% of all households were made up of individuals, and 12.0% had someone living alone who was sixty-five years of age or older.

The average household size was 2.73 and the average family size was 3.04.

Within the township, the population was spread out, with 20.2% of residents who were under the age of eighteen, 3.7% who were aged eighteen to twenty-four, 22.9% who were aged twenty-five to forty-four, 15.9% who were aged forty-five to sixty-four, and 37.4% who were sixty-five years of age or older. The median age was forty-eight years.

For every one hundred females, there were 74.3 males. For every one hundred females who were aged eighteen or older, there were 68.9 males.

The median income for a household in the township was $31,375, and the median income for a family was $34,167. Males had a median income of $28,542 compared with that of $18,500 for females.

The per capita income for the township was $16,473.

Approximately 10.8% of families and 14.3% of the population were living below the poverty line, including 22.8% of those who were under the age of eighteen and 3.8% of those who were aged sixty-five or older.
