= Ridgway Historic District =

Historic district in Pennsylvania, United States

- U.S. National Register of Historic Places
- U.S. Historic district
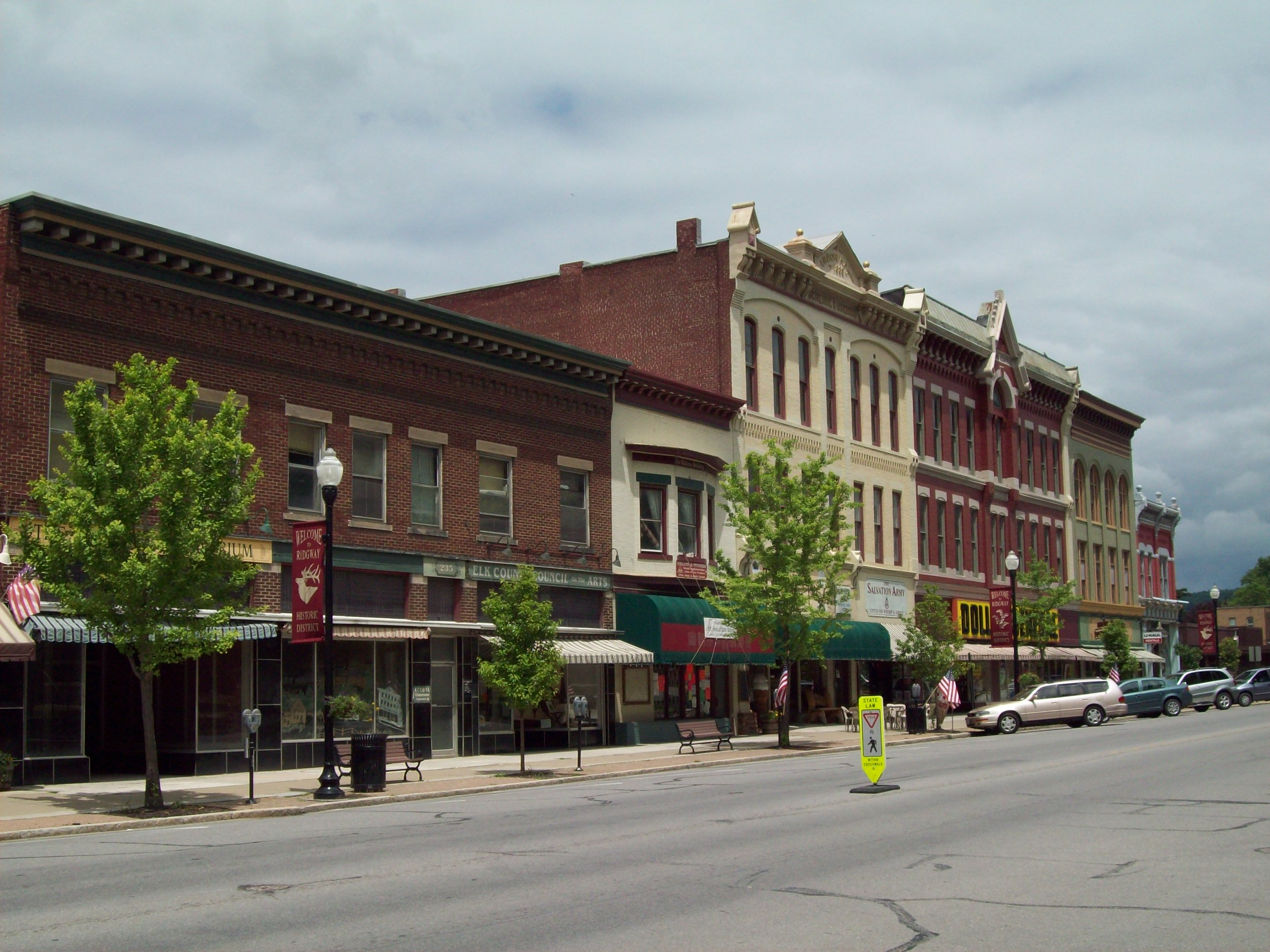
- Ridgway Historic District, June 2009

- Location within Pennsylvania Location within the United States
- Location: Roughly bounded by the Borough line, Clarion R, Erie Alley, and Gallagher Run, Ridgway, Pennsylvania
- Coordinates: 41°25′12″N 78°43′40″W
- Area: 252 acres (102 ha)
- Built: 1881
- Architect: J.P. Martson; Hyde-Murphy & Co.
- Architectural style: Late Victorian, Late 19th And 20th Century Revivals
- NRHP reference No.: 02001180
- Added to NRHP: January 22, 2003

The Ridgway Historic District is a national historic district that is located in Ridgway in Elk County, Pennsylvania.

It was added to the National Register of Historic Places in 2003.

== History and architectural features ==
This district includes 726 contributing buildings, one contributing structure, and two contributing objects, and encompasses the historic central business district and surrounding residential neighborhoods. The architecture varies from modest vernacular residences and commercial buildings to spacious and highly detailed homes and business blocks, and a diverse collection of government buildings, churches, and schools. Located within the district is the Elk County Courthouse and its attached jail.
