= Highland Township, Clarion County, Pennsylvania =

Township in Pennsylvania, US

Coordinates: 41°15′38″N 79°20′15″W

- Township
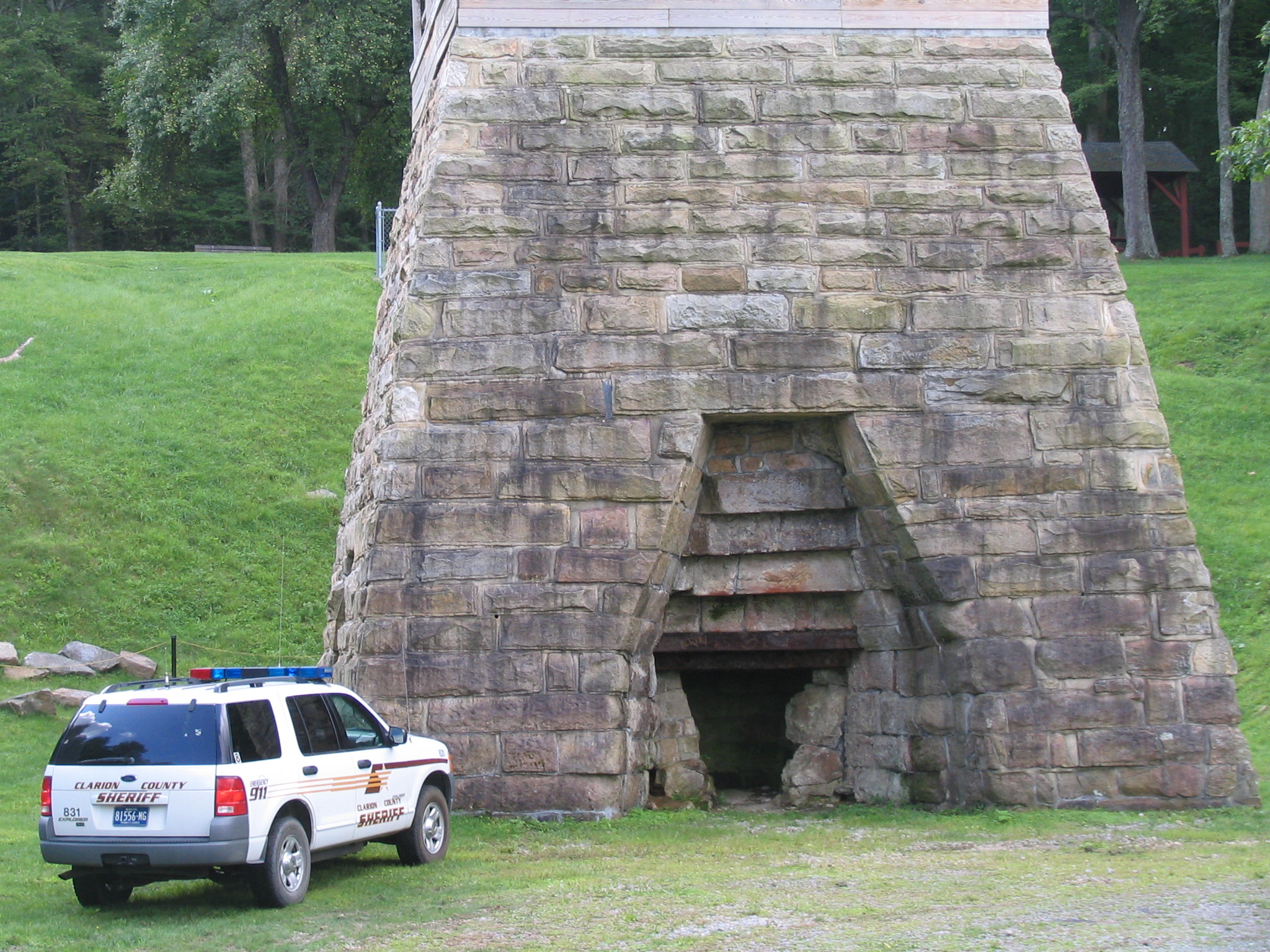
- Hieland Furnace, built 1845

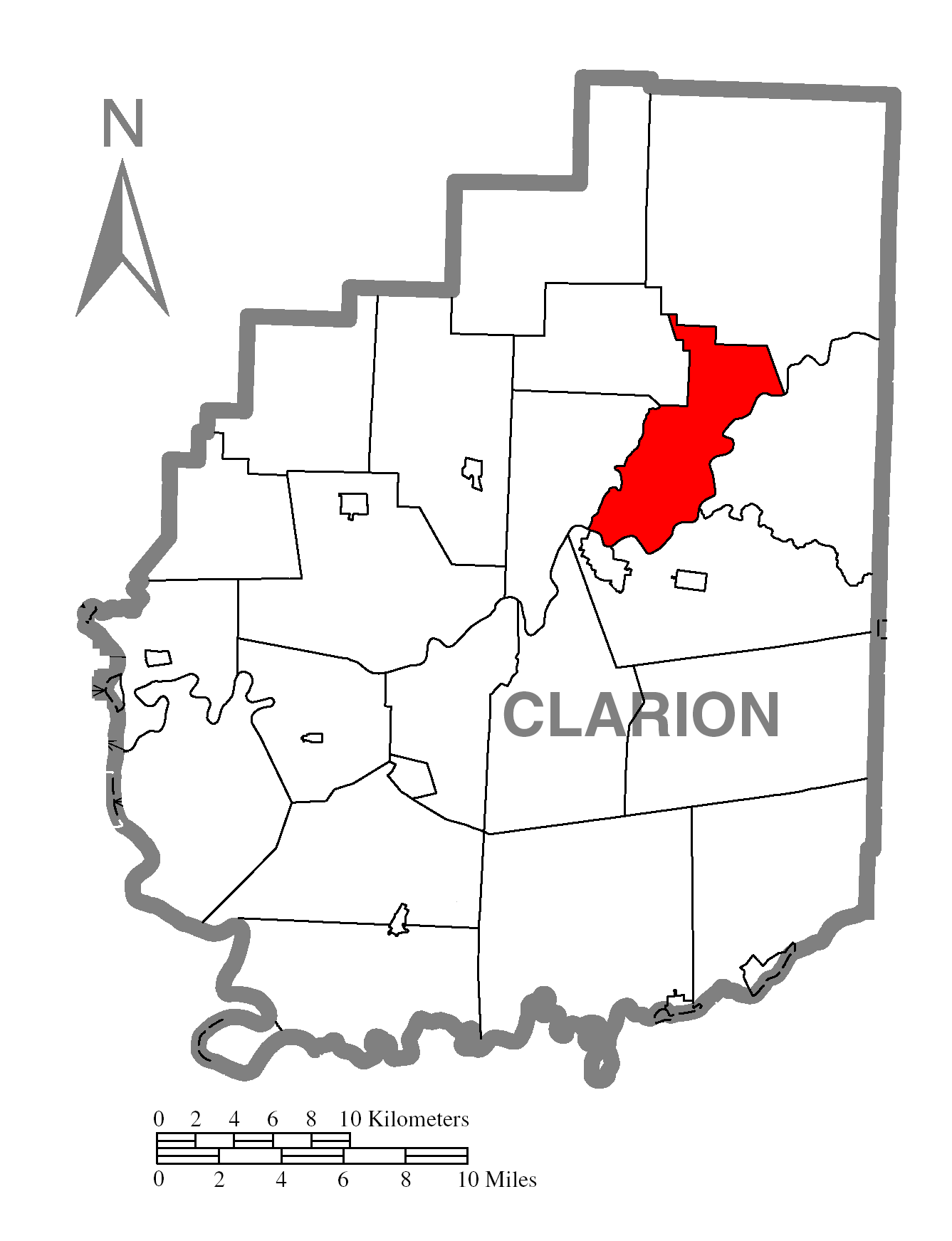
- Map of Clarion County, Pennsylvania highlighting Highland Township

- Map of Clarion County, Pennsylvania
- Country: United States
- State: Pennsylvania
- County: Clarion
- Incorporated: 1848

Area
  - Total: 20.24 sq mi (52.42 km^{2})
  - Land: 19.91 sq mi (51.57 km^{2})
  - Water: 0.33 sq mi (0.85 km^{2})

Population (2020)
  - Total: 533 ▲
  - Estimate (2022): 532
  - Density: 26.8/sq mi (10.3/km^{2})
- Time zone: UTC-5 (Eastern (EST))
  - Summer (DST): UTC-4 (EDT)
- FIPS code: 42-031-34456

Highland Township is a township which is located in Clarion County, Pennsylvania, United States.

The population was 533 at the time of the 2020 census, an increase from the figure of 525 tabulated in 2010, which was, in turn, a decline from the total of 633 residents at the time of the 2000 census.

== Geography ==
The township is located northeast of the center of Clarion County and is bordered by the Clarion River to the south and southeast and by its tributary Toby Creek to the west. The borough of Clarion, the county seat, borders the township to the southwest, across the Clarion River.

According to the United States Census Bureau, the township has a total area of 20.2 square miles (52.4 km^{2}), of which 19.9 square miles (51.6 km^{2}) is land and 0.3 square miles (0.8 km^{2}), or 1.62%, is water.

== Demographics ==
Historical population
Census	Pop.	Note	%±
2010	525		—
2020	533		1.5%
2022 (est.)	532		−0.2%
U.S. Decennial Census

As of the census of 2000, there were 633 people, 243 households, and 184 families residing in the township.

The population density was 33.4 inhabitants per square mile (12.9/km^{2}). There were 365 housing units at an average density of 19.3/sq mi (7.4/km^{2}).

The racial makeup of the township was 97.16% White, 0.95% African American, 0.47% Native American, 0.32% Asian, and 1.11% from two or more races.

There were 243 households, out of which 30.5% had children under the age of eighteen living with them; 66.7% were married couples living together, 4.9% had a female householder with no husband present, and 23.9% were non-families. 20.2% of all households were made up of individuals, and 5.3% had someone living alone who was sixty-five years of age or older.

The average household size was 2.60 and the average family size was 3.03.

In the township the population was spread out, with 24.3% under the age of eighteen, 6.2% from eighteen to twenty-four, 29.4% from twenty-five to forty-four, 25.9% from forty-five to sixty-four, and 14.2% who were sixty-five years of age or older. The median age was forty-one years.

For every one hundred females, there were 104.9 males. For every one hundred females who were aged eighteen or older, there were 104.7 males.

The median income for a household in the township was $37,188, and the median income for a family was $43,438. Males had a median income of $29,219 compared with that of $21,607 for females.

The per capita income for the township was $16,468.

Roughly 4.4% of families and 5.2% of the population were living below the poverty line, including 3.2% of those who were under the age of eighteen and 9.5% of those who were aged sixty-five or older.
