= Ridgway Township, Pennsylvania =

Township in Pennsylvania, United States

Coordinates: 41°22′00″N 78°45′59″W

- Township
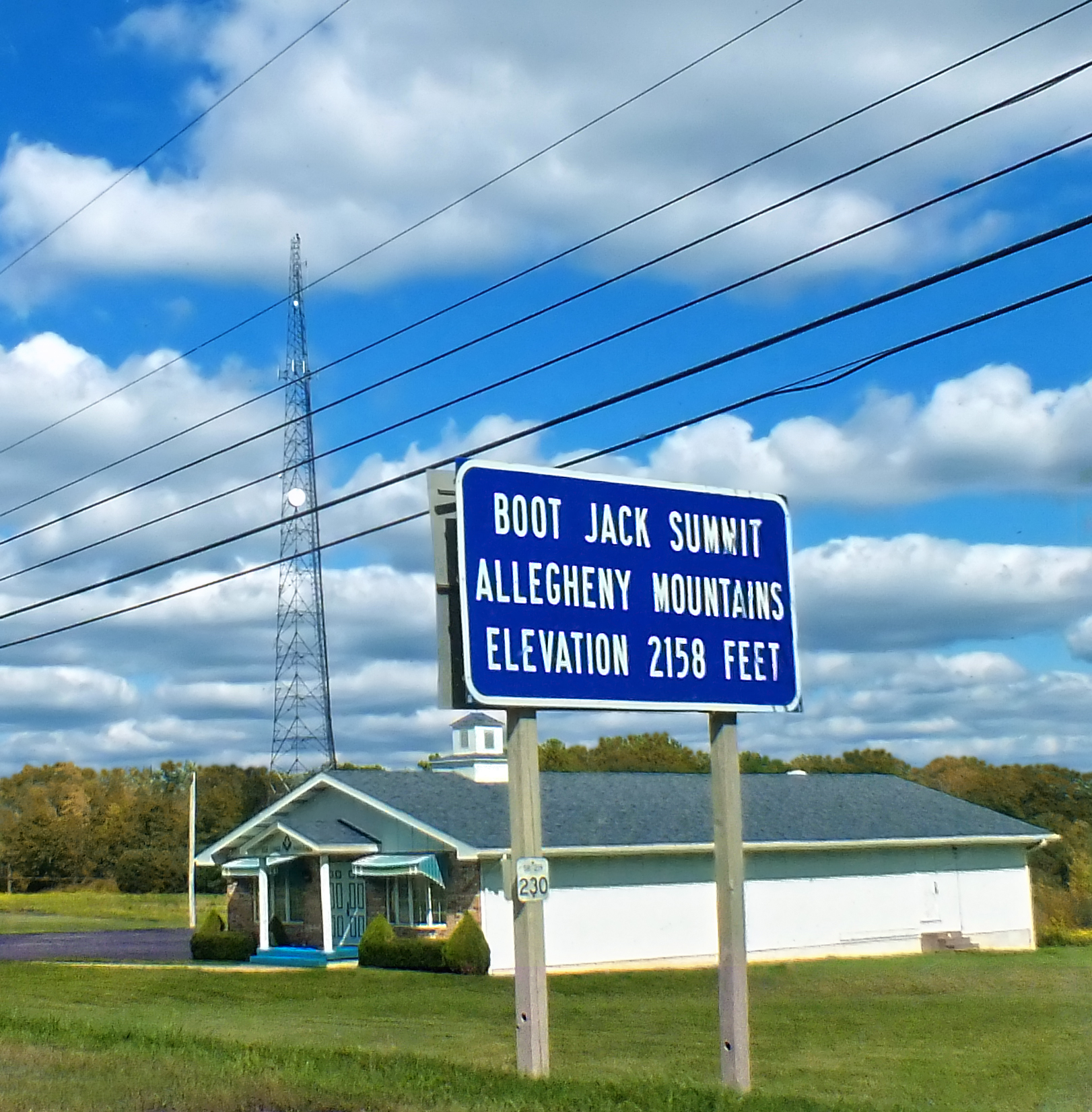
- Boot Jack Summit in the township

- Location in Elk County and the state of Pennsylvania.
- Country: United States
- State: Pennsylvania
- County: Elk
- Settled: 1825
- Incorporated: 1833

Area
  - Total: 87.81 sq mi (227.43 km^{2})
  - Land: 86.90 sq mi (225.08 km^{2})
  - Water: 0.91 sq mi (2.35 km^{2})

Population (2020)
  - Total: 2,424
  - Estimate (2022): 2,390
  - Density: 27.89/sq mi (10.77/km^{2})
- FIPS code: 42-047-64792
- Website: https://www.ridgwaytownship.com/

Ridgway Township is a township in Elk County, Pennsylvania, United States. The population was 2,424 at the 2020 census, down from 2,523 in 2010, down from 2,802 at the 2000 census.

== History ==
Ridgway Township was named for Jacob Ridgway, a local landowner.

The Bonifels home was added to the National Register of Historic Places in 1978.

== Geography ==
Ridgway Township is in central Elk County. It surrounds the boroughs of Ridgway and Johnsonburg. The Clarion River flows from northeast to southwest through the center of the township.

According to the United States Census Bureau, Ridgway Township has a total area of 87.8 square miles (227.4 km^{2}), of which 86.9 square miles (225.1 km^{2}) is land and 0.93 square miles (2.4 km^{2}), or 1.03%, is water.

== Demographics ==
Historical population
Census	Pop.	Note	%±
2000	2,802		—
2010	2,523		−10.0%
2020	2,424		−3.9%
2022 (est.)	2,390		−1.4%
U.S. Decennial Census

As of the census of 2000, there were 2,802 people, 1,069 households, and 803 families residing in the township. The population density was 32.1 inhabitants per square mile (12.4/km^{2}). There were 1,237 housing units at an average density of 14.2 units per square mile (5.5 units/km^{2}). The racial makeup of the township was 99.29% White, 0.14% African American, 0.04% Native American, 0.11% Asian, 0.11% from other races, and 0.32% from two or more races. Hispanic or Latino of any race were 0.32% of the population.

There were 1,069 households, out of which 35.5% had children under the age of 18 living with them, 62.6% were married couples living together, 8.7% had a female householder with no husband present, and 24.8% were non-families. 21.6% of all households were made up of individuals, and 9.7% had someone living alone who was 65 years of age or older. The average household size was 2.59 and the average family size was 3.03.

In the township the population was spread out, with 25.9% under the age of 18, 6.4% from 18 to 24, 27.7% from 25 to 44, 24.8% from 45 to 64, and 15.2% who were 65 years of age or older. The median age was 40 years. For every 100 females, there were 100.3 males. For every 100 females age 18 and over, there were 96.7 males.

The median income for a household in the township was $42,228, and the median income for a family was $49,181. Males had a median income of $36,316 versus $24,359 for females. The per capita income for the township was $19,763. About 5.4% of families and 7.0% of the population were below the poverty line, including 8.3% of those under age 18 and 6.7% of those age 65 or over.
