= Millstone Township, Pennsylvania =

Township in Pennsylvania, United States

Coordinates: 41°22′00″N 78°58′59″W

- Township
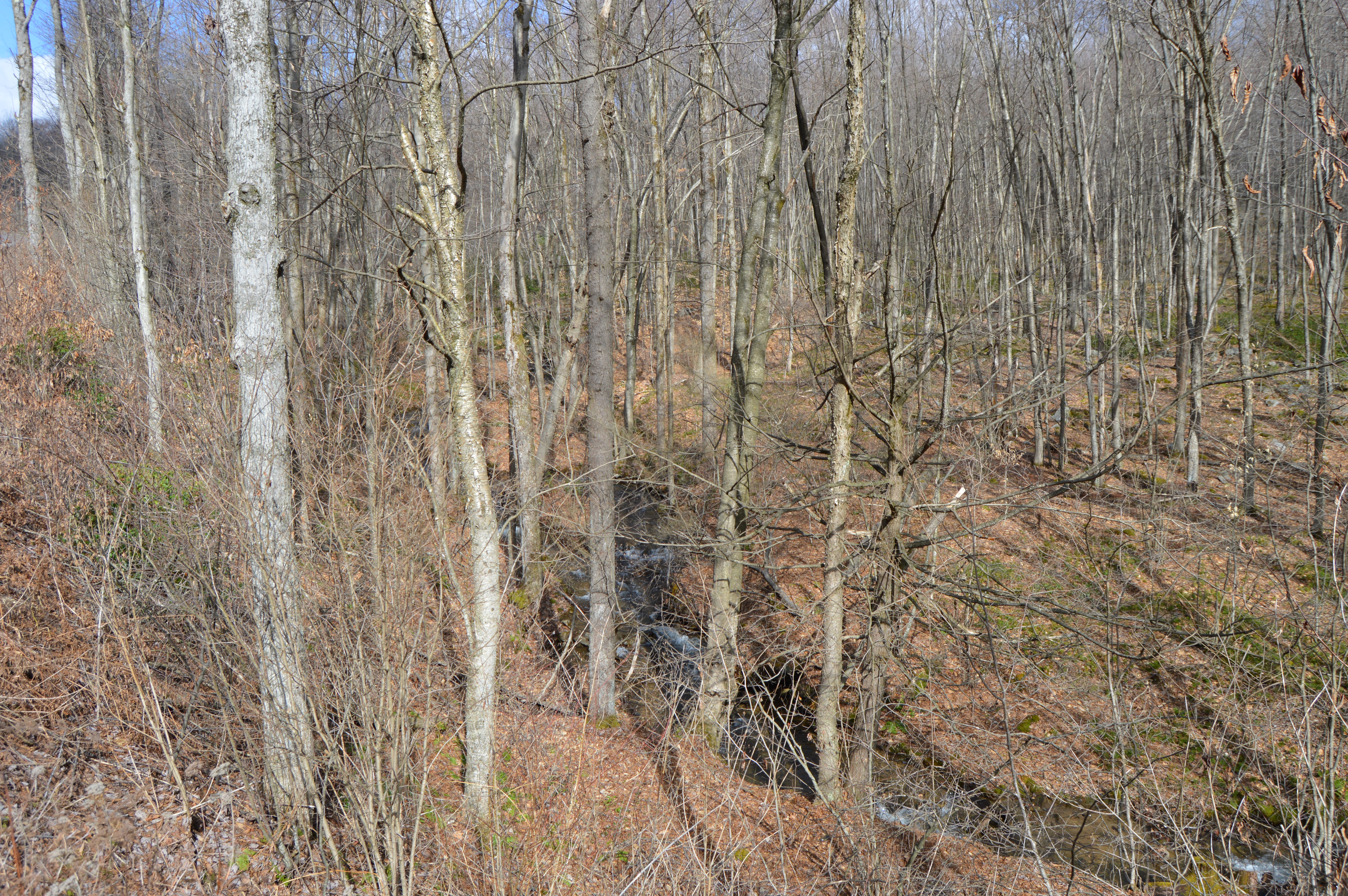
- A small stream along Hallton-Belltown Road

- Location in Elk County and the state of Pennsylvania.
- Country: United States
- State: Pennsylvania
- County: Elk
- Settled: 1826
- Incorporated: 1870

Area
  - Total: 41.60 sq mi (107.74 km^{2})
  - Land: 41.48 sq mi (107.42 km^{2})
  - Water: 0.13 sq mi (0.33 km^{2})

Population (2020)
  - Total: 95
  - Estimate (2022): 93
  - Density: 2.3/sq mi (0.88/km^{2})
- FIPS code: 42-047-49888

Millstone Township is a township in Elk County, Pennsylvania, United States. The population was 95 at the 2020 census, up from 82 in 2010.

Millstone Township took its name from Millstone Creek, a tributary of the Clarion River.

== Geography ==
The township occupies the western end of Elk County and is bordered by Forest County to the north and west and by Jefferson County to the south. The Clarion River forms the southern boundary of the township.

According to the United States Census Bureau, the township has a total area of 41.6 square miles (107.7 km^{2}), of which 41.5 square miles (107.4 km^{2}) is land and 0.12 square miles (0.3 km^{2}), or 0.30%, is water.

== Demographics ==
Historical population
Census	Pop.	Note	%±
2000	95		—
2010	82		−13.7%
2020	95		15.9%
2022 (est.)	93		−2.1%
U.S. Decennial Census

As of the census of 2000, there were 95 people, 44 households, and 28 families residing in the township. The population density was 2.3 people per square mile (0.89 people/km^{2}). There were 403 housing units at an average density of 9.7 units per square mile (3.7 units/km^{2}). The racial makeup of the township was 94.74% White, 1.05% Native American, and 4.21% from two or more races.

There were 44 households, out of which 22.7% had children under the age of 18 living with them, 54.5% were married couples living together, 6.8% had a female householder with no husband present, and 34.1% were non-families. 31.8% of all households were made up of individuals, and 9.1% had someone living alone who was 65 years of age or older. The average household size was 2.16 and the average family size was 2.66.

In the township the population was spread out, with 20.0% under the age of 18, 2.1% from 18 to 24, 31.6% from 25 to 44, 28.4% from 45 to 64, and 17.9% who were 65 years of age or older. The median age was 42 years. For every 100 females there were 102.1 males. For every 100 females age 18 and over, there were 117.1 males.

The median income for a household in the township was $21,250, and the median income for a family was $23,750. Males had a median income of $21,250 versus $11,250 for females. The per capita income for the township was $11,462. There were 17.9% of families and 26.9% of the population living below the poverty line, including 66.7% of under eighteens and none of those over 64.

== Education ==
It is in the Forest Area School District.
