= Johnsonburg, Pennsylvania =

Borough in Pennsylvania, US

- Borough
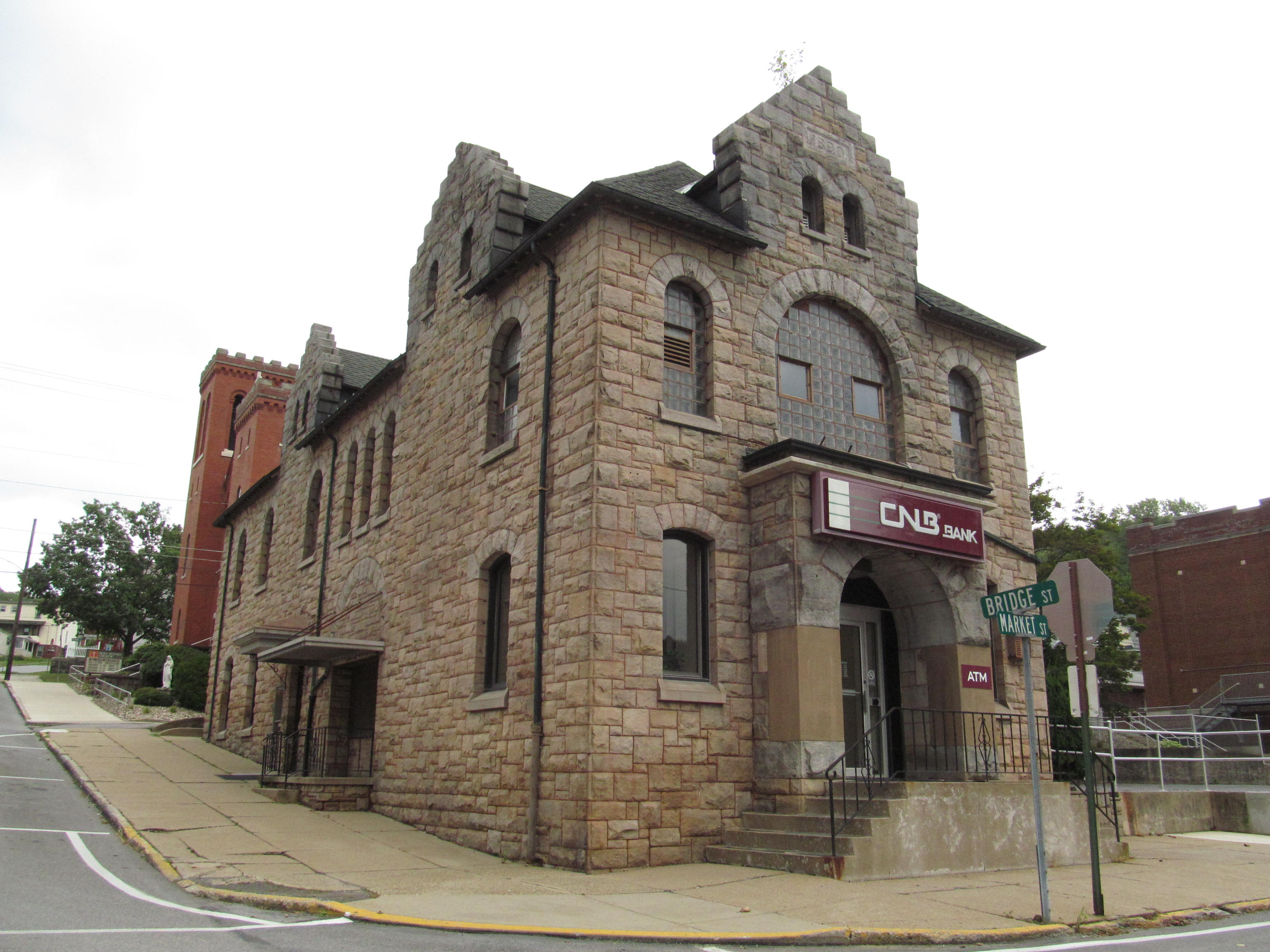

- Location in Elk County and the U.S. state of Pennsylvania.
- Coordinates: 41°29′38″N 78°40′47″W
- Country: United States
- State: Pennsylvania
- County: Elk
- Settled: 1810
- Incorporated (borough): 1891

Area
  - Total: 2.92 sq mi (7.57 km^{2})
  - Land: 2.88 sq mi (7.47 km^{2})
  - Water: 0.039 sq mi (0.10 km^{2})
- Elevation: 1,444 ft (440 m)

Population (2020)
  - Total: 2,404
  - Density: 830/sq mi (322/km^{2})
- Time zone: UTC-5 (Eastern (EST))
  - Summer (DST): UTC-4 (EDT)
- Zip code: 15845
- Area code: 814
- FIPS code: 42-38248
- Website: http://www.johnsonburgpa.com/

Johnsonburg is a borough in Elk County, Pennsylvania, 124 miles (200 km) northeast of Pittsburgh and 115 miles (185 km) south of Buffalo, New York, in a productive farming and lumbering region. Paper mills were once common in the borough, with the Domtar mill still operating. In 1910, 4,334 people lived here. The population was 2,404 at the 2020 census.

== History ==
It was founded in 1810 and incorporated in 1891.

The Johnsonburg Commercial Historic District was listed on the National Register of Historic Places in 1999.

== Geography ==
Johnsonburg is located at 41°29′38″N 78°40′47″W (41.493950, -78.679600).

According to the United States Census Bureau, the borough has a total area of 2.94 square miles (7.6 km^{2}), 2.9 square miles (7.5 km^{2}) of it land and 0.04 square miles (0.10 km^{2}) (1.38%) of it water. It is also home to the Johnsonburg Area School.

== Demographics ==
Historical population
Census	Pop.	Note	%±
1890	1,280		—
1900	3,894		204.2%
1910	4,334		11.3%
1920	5,400		24.6%
1930	4,737		−12.3%
1940	4,955		4.6%
1950	4,567		−7.8%
1960	4,966		8.7%
1970	4,304		−13.3%
1980	3,938		−8.5%
1990	3,350		−14.9%
2000	3,003		−10.4%
2010	2,483		−17.3%
2020	2,404		−3.2%

=== 2010 ===
As of the census of 2010, there were 2,483 people, 1,126 households, and 663 families residing in the borough. The population density was 856.2 inhabitants per square mile (330.6/km^{2}). There were 1,293 housing units at an average density of 445.8 units per square mile (172.1 units/km^{2}). The racial makeup of the borough was 98.1% White, 0.1% African American, 0.2% Native American, 0.3% Asian, 0.05% Pacific Islander, 0.3% from other races, and 0.95% from two or more races. Hispanic or Latino of any race were 1.5% of the population.

There were 1,126 households, out of which 28% had children under the age of 18 living with them, 41.1% were married couples living together, 12.7% had a female householder with no husband present, and 41.1% were non-families. 37.5% of all households were made up of individuals, and 17.1% had someone living alone who was 65 years of age or older. The average household size was 2.21 and the average family size was 2.87.

In the borough the population was spread out, with 22.6% under the age of 18, 59.2% from 18 to 64, and 18.2% who were 65 years of age or older. The median age was 42 years.

The median income for a household in the borough was $30,856, and the median income for a family was $43,250. Males had a median income of $42,917 versus $24,207 for females. The per capita income for the borough was $16,438. About 9.8% of families and 16.9% of the population were below the poverty line, including 29.2% of those under age 18 and 7.0% of those age 65 or over.

=== 2000 ===
As of the census of 2000, there were 3,003 people, 1,292 households, and 811 families residing in the borough. The population density was 989.6 inhabitants per square mile (382.1/km^{2}). There were 1,435 housing units at an average density of 472.9 units per square mile (182.6 units/km^{2}). The racial makeup of the borough was 98.83% White, 0.03% African American, 0.30% Native American, 0.37% Asian, 0.03% Pacific Islander, 0.10% from other races, and 0.33% from two or more races. Hispanic or Latino of any race were 1.30% of the population.

There were 1,292 households, out of which 28.3% had children under the age of 18 living with them, 45.4% were married couples living together, 11.8% had a female householder with no husband present, and 37.2% were non-families. 33.3% of all households were made up of individuals, and 16.5% had someone living alone who was 65 years of age or older. The average household size was 2.32 and the average family size was 2.97.

In the borough the population was spread out, with 24.4% under the age of 18, 7.6% from 18 to 24, 27.3% from 25 to 44, 20.7% from 45 to 64, and 19.9% who were 65 years of age or older. The median age was 39 years. For every 100 females there were 96.8 males. For every 100 females age 18 and over, there were 94.4 males.

The median income for a household in the borough was $27,924, and the median income for a family was $39,491. Males had a median income of $33,354 versus $21,683 for females. The per capita income for the borough was $15,631. About 15.4% of families and 17.6% of the population were below the poverty line, including 29.4% of those under age 18 and 7.0% of those age 65 or over.

== Paper mill ==
The major industry in Johnsonburg is paper, with the largest mill owned by the Domtar Corporation. It was built more than a century ago, originally owned principally by the Armstrong family of Philadelphia (1888). By 1890 the Armstrong's had merged with the paper mills owned by Augustus Paine of New York to become the New York & Pennsylvania Company. The Curtis Publishing Company, publisher of the Saturday Evening Post purchased the mill in 1925. By 1950, it was believed to be the largest coated paper mill in the world. By the end of 1960s, Curtis Publishing filed for bankruptcy and closed the mill. Six months later, investors, including industrialist George S. Petty, formed a group called Penntech Papers, to purchase the mill assets, and continued it in operation for the next 20 years. In 1990, Penntech sold the mill to Willamette Industries, which was acquired by Weyerhaeuser in February 2002 in a hostile takeover and then in 2007 was acquired by Domtar. Paper Excellence acquired Domtar in 2021 for $3 billion cash.

== Historical notes ==
- Is the oldest settlement in Elk County, first settled in 1810.
- The U.S. Post Office attempted to rename Johnsonburg as "Quay" to honor Matthew Quay, U.S. Senator. That effort failed in 1890.
- Like many towns in the 1920s and 1930s with organized crime, the borough carried the name of "Little Chicago."
- It was once considered a booming town along the Clarion River where United States President Ulysses S. Grant visited during and after his presidency to fish with other retired Civil War generals that had lived there. Neighboring municipalities such as Kane and Wilcox were named after generals.
- During World War II, the borough had, per capita, the highest number of soldiers entering into military service in Elk County. This fact was officially recognized years later.
- Paper from the mill originally was used for the Saturday Evening Post during the days that artist Norman Rockwell would do its covers. In later years, it would produce the paper used for the books in the Harry Potter series.
- The Johnsonburg Commercial Historic District was listed on the National Register of Historic Places in 1999.
- As of 2010, Johnsonburg had the third-least expensive median house price in the United States at $38,588.
- The first settler of Johnsonburg was David Johnson, who settled at the confluence of the West Branch River and the East Branch River that combine to make the Clarion River. The paper mill now lies where Johnson settled.

== Schools ==
- Johnsonburg Elementary School
- Johnsonburg Area High School

== Media ==
- Johnsonburg Press (weekly)
- Johnsonburg Hometown News (weekly)

== Notable people ==
- Domenico Monardo-Meco—Record producer and musician responsible for disco Star Wars theme.
