= Pennsylvania State Game Lands Number 25 =

Park in the United States

- Location within Pennsylvania Location within the United States
- Location: Elk County
- Coordinates: 41°29′39″N 78°35′42″W
- Area: 24,117 acres (9,760 ha)
- Elevation: 1,998 feet (609 m)
- Max. elevation: 2,335 feet (712 m)
- Min. elevation: 1,480 feet (450 m)
- Owner: Pennsylvania Game Commission

The Pennsylvania State Game Lands Number 25 are Pennsylvania State Game Lands in Elk County in Pennsylvania in the United States providing hunting, bird watching, and other activities.

== Geography ==
State Game Lands Number 25 is located in the City of St. Marys, and in Jones and Ridgway Townships in Elk County.

Nearby communities include the City of Saint Marys, the borough of Johnsonburg, and census-designated places and populated places Boot Jack, Dagus, Dagus Mines, Dahoga, Earlyville, Fairview Glen Hazel, Grandview, Instanter, Kaulmont, Kersey, Ketner, Lynchville, Midmont, Montmorenci, Paine, Rasselas, Rathbun, Ridgeway, Rolfe, Shelvey, Straight Creek, Streights, Swissmont, Tambine, Whistletown, Wilcox, and Williamsville.

U.S. Route 219 passes north/south immediately west of the Game Lands, Pennsylvania Route 120 is east/west oriented just south of SGL 25, Pennsylvania Route 255 passes through north/south through the Game Lands and Pennsylvania Route 948 passes north/south to the west connecting with Routes 219 and 120.

Almost all of SGL 25 is part of the Clarion River watershed, which is part of the Allegheny River watershed. Tributaries include Bendigo Run, Crooked Creek, Dutch Creek, East Branch Clarion River (which includes the East Branch Clarion River Lake), Elk Creek, Maple Run, Middle Fork East Branch Clarion River, Powers Run, Rocky Run, Seventy One, Silver Run, South Fork Straight Creek and Water Tank Run. The southeast portion of the Game Lands is drained by West Creek, part of the Susquehanna River watershed. Tributaries include Bear Run, Kay Fork, Little Bear Run and North Fork West Creek.

Other Pennsylvania State Game Lands within 30 miles include 14, 28, 30, 34, 44, 54, 61, 62, 77, 94, 293, 301, 311, and 331. Other nearby protected areas include Allegheny National Forest, Elk State Park, Kinzua Bridge State Park and Parker Dam State Park.

== Statistics ==
SGL 25 was entered into the Geographic Names Information System on 2 August 1979 as identification number 1210215, elevations range from 1,480 feet (450 m) to 2,335 feet (712 m). SGL 25 is of two parcels consisting of 24,117 acres (9,760 ha).The coordinates of the two parcels are
41°29′39″N 78°35′16″W
41°25′58″N 78°42′0″W

== Biology ==
SGL 25 terrain consists of flat mountain tops and narrow valleys, entirely forested. Game species include bear (Ursus americanus), White-tailed deer (Odocoileus virginianus) and turkey (Meleagris gallopavo).

== See also ==
- Pennsylvania State Game Lands
- Pennsylvania State Game Lands Number 14, also located in Elk County
- Pennsylvania State Game Lands Number 28, also located in Elk County
