= Pennsylvania State Game Lands Number 34 =

Park in the United States

- Location within Pennsylvania Location within the United States
- Location: Clearfield County
- Coordinates: 41°12′49″N 78°14′12″W; 41°14′9″N 78°18′23″W; 41°16′18″N 78°21′35″W; 41°16′21″N 78°28′14″W
- Area: 10,248 acres (4,147 ha)
- Max. elevation: 2,264 feet (690 m)
- Min. elevation: 1,120 feet (340 m)
- Owner: Pennsylvania Game Commission
- GNIS ID 1188511

The Pennsylvania State Game Lands Number 34 are Pennsylvania State Game Lands in Clearfield County in Pennsylvania in the United States providing hunting, bird watching, and other activities.

== Geography ==
State Game Lands Number 34 is located in Covington and Girard Townships in Clearfield County, and in Benezette and Jay Townships in Elk County. Nearby communities include Census-designated places Byrnedale, Force and Weedville, as well as unincorporated communities Benezette, Caledonia, Huntley, Medix Run, Scattertown and Tyler.

Nearby highways include Pennsylvania Routes 255, 555 and 879.

All the parcels of SGL 34 lie within the West Branch Susquehanna River and Susquehanna River watersheds. Streams include Johnson Run and Silvermill Hollow Run both which drain to Bennett Branch Sinnemahoning Creek, then Sinnemahoning Creek. Jack Dent Branch flows to Medix Run, then the Bennett Branch. Mosquito Creek flows through SGL 34 and collects effluent from Gifford Run, McNerney Run, Panther run and Pebble Run, then flowing to the West Branch Susquehanna River.

Protected areas within 30 miles include:

=== National Forests ===
- Allegheny National Forest

=== State Parks ===
- Black Moshannon State Park
- Bucktail State Park Natural Area
- Elk State Park
- Kettle Creek State Park
- Parker Dam State Park
- S. B. Elliott State Park
- Sizerville State Park

=== State Forests ===
- Sproul State Forest

=== Pennsylvania State Game Lands ===
- Pennsylvania State Game Lands Number 14
- Pennsylvania State Game Lands Number 25
- Pennsylvania State Game Lands Number 30
- Pennsylvania State Game Lands Number 33
- Pennsylvania State Game Lands Number 44
- Pennsylvania State Game Lands Number 54
- Pennsylvania State Game Lands Number 77
- Pennsylvania State Game Lands Number 78
- Pennsylvania State Game Lands Number 87
- Pennsylvania State Game Lands Number 90
- Pennsylvania State Game Lands Number 94
- Pennsylvania State Game Lands Number 98
- Pennsylvania State Game Lands Number 100
- Pennsylvania State Game Lands Number 103
- Pennsylvania State Game Lands Number 195
- Pennsylvania State Game Lands Number 293
- Pennsylvania State Game Lands Number 311
- Pennsylvania State Game Lands Number 321
- Pennsylvania State Game Lands Number 331

== Statistics ==
SGL 34 was entered into the Geographic Names Information System on 2 August 1979 as identification number 1188511. Elevations range from 1,500 feet (460 m) to 2,264 feet (690 m), consisting of 10,248 acres (4,147 ha) in four parcels centered around coordinates 41°11′58″N 78°19′28″W See the infobox for coordinates of individual parcels.

== See also ==
Pennsylvania State Game Lands
