= Pennsylvania State Game Lands Number 14 =

Park in the United States

- Location within Pennsylvania Location within the United States
- Location: Cameron County; Elk County
- Coordinates: 41°25′50″N 78°21′18″W
- Area: 14,947 acres (6,049 ha)
- Elevation: 1,749 feet (533 m)
- Max. elevation: 2,332 feet (711 m)
- Min. elevation: 1,300 feet (400 m)
- Owner: Pennsylvania Game Commission

The Pennsylvania State Game Lands Number 14 are Pennsylvania State Game Lands in Cameron, and Elk Counties in Pennsylvania in the United States providing hunting, bird watching, and other activities.

== Geography ==
State Game Lands Number 14 is located in Shippen Township in Cameron County, and in Benzette Township in Elk County.

The nearest borough is Emporium 4.7 miles (7.6 km) to the northeast, nearest populated places include Beechwood, Benezette, Cameron, Dents Run, Grandview, Hicks Run, Howard Siding, Kaulmont, Lawn View, Lockwood, Medix Run, Prospect Park, Rathbun, Rich Valley, Sterling Run, Swissmont, Truman, Weber City, West Creek, and Wilmer.

U.S. Route 120 passes to the north and east, U.S. Route 155 and Pennsylvania Route 46 connect to U.S. 120 northeast of SGL 14.

SGL 14 is drained by tributaries of the Sinnemahoning Creek, part of the Susquehanna River watershed.

Nearby natural areas include Pennsylvania State Game Lands Number 30 and Pennsylvania State Game Lands Number 61 to the north, Kettle Creek State Park and Sproul State Forest to the east, Bucktail State Park Natural Area to the southeast, Pennsylvania State Game Lands Number 34, Pennsylvania State Game Lands Number 94 and Pennsylvania State Game Lands Number 311 to the south, Pennsylvania State Game Lands Number 94 and Pennsylvania State Game Lands Number 331 to the southwest, Pennsylvania State Game Lands Number 44 to the west, and Elk State Park, Pennsylvania State Game Lands Number 25 and Pennsylvania State Game Lands Number 293 both to the northwest.

== Statistics ==
SGL 14 was entered into the Geographic Names Information System on 2 August 1979 as identification number 1199597, elevation is listed as 1,749 feet (533 m). The game lands consists of 14,947 acres (6,049 ha) in a single parcel located at 41°25′50″N 78°21′18″W, elevations range from 1,300 feet (400 m) to 2,332 feet (711 m). SGL 14 is located at 41°25′50″N 78°21′18″W

== Biology ==
Wildlife species in SGL 14 include bear (Ursus americanus), deer (Odocoileus virginianus), grouse (Bonasa umbellus) and turkey (Meleagris gallopavo).

== See also ==
- Pennsylvania State Game Lands
- Pennsylvania State Game Lands Number 25, also located in Elk County
- Pennsylvania State Game Lands Number 28, also located in Elk County
