= Lower Jerry Run Natural Area =

Natural area in Pennsylvania

- Location within Pennsylvania
- Location: Cameron County, Pennsylvania
- Nearest town: Sinnemahoning
- Coordinates: 41°16′28″N 78°03′36″W
- Area: 892 acres (361 ha)

Lower Jerry Run Natural Area is an 892-acre (361 ha) protected area in Cameron County, Pennsylvania, United States. It is part of Elk State Forest.

== Description ==
The Natural Area was established to protect a grove of old-growth hemlock and pine trees. The area is inhabited by some members of Pennsylvania's elk population and a robust quantity of eastern timber rattlesnakes. Only two remote corners of the Natural Area can be accessed via established hiking trails, and otherwise it can only be explored by experienced outdoorspersons.
