= Pennsylvania State Game Lands Number 30 =

Park in the United States

- Location within Pennsylvania Location within the United States
- Location: McKean County
- Coordinates: 41°38′23″N 78°20′29″W
- Area: 11,604 acres (4,696 ha)
- Elevation: 2,300 feet (700 m)
- Max. elevation: 2,427 feet (740 m)
- Min. elevation: 1,600 feet (490 m)
- Owner: Pennsylvania Game Commission
- Website: https://www.pgc.pa.gov/HuntTrap/StateGameLands/Documents/SGL%20Maps/SGL__030.pdf

The Pennsylvania State Game Lands Number 30 are Pennsylvania State Game Lands in McKean County in Pennsylvania in the United States providing hunting, bird watching, and other activities.

== Geography ==
State Game Lands Number 30 is located in Norwich Township in McKean County. Nearby communities include the unincorporated communities Straight Creek in Elk County, and Betula, Gardeau and Norwich in McKean County.

Highways passing nearby SGL 30 include U.S. Route 6, Pennsylvania Routes 46, 146, 155 and 607.

The southeast portion of SGL 30 and a small southwest portion is drained by Hunting Shanty Run, North Creek, Oviatt Branch, Pepper Run, Twenty Seven Branch and Waldy Run, all leading to the Driftwood Branch Sinnemahoning Creek, to the Sinnemahoning Creek, to the West Branch Susquehanna River, all part of the Susquehanna River watershed. The remaining portions of SGL 30 are drained by East Branch Potato Creek, Hand Brook, Havens Run, Indian Run, Long Run, Lyman Run, Murdock Branch, Potato Creek, Railroad Run and Short Run, all part of the Allegheny River watershed.

Other nearby protected areas in Pennsylvania within 30 miles of SGL 30 include the Allegheny National Forest, Bendigo State Park, Bucktail State Park Natural Area, Cherry Springs State Park, Denton Hill State Park, Elk State Park, Kettle Creek State Park, Kinzua Bridge State Park, Lyman Run State Park and Sinnemahoning State Park, and Sproul State Forest, as well as Pennsylvania State Game Lands Numbers 14, 25, 44, 59, 61, 62, 204, 293, 301 and 311.

== Statistics ==
SGL 30 was entered into the Geographic Names Information System on 2 August 1979 as identification number 1208051. Elevations range from 1,600 feet (490 m) to 2,427 feet (740 m) consisting of 11,604 acres (4,696 ha) in a single parcel at 41°38′23″N 78°20′29″W.

== Biology ==
Hunting and trapping species include bear (Ursus americanus), deer (Odocoileus virginianus), Ruffed grouse (Bonasa umbellus) and turkey (Meleagris vison).
