= Mix Run, Pennsylvania =

Unincorporated community in Pennsylvania, US

- Unincorporated village
- Location within the U.S. state of Pennsylvania Mix Run (the United States)
- Coordinates: 41°20′25″N 78°11′36″W
- Country: United States
- State: Pennsylvania
- County: Cameron
- Time zone: UTC-5 (Eastern (EST))
  - Summer (DST): UTC-4 (EDT)

Mix Run is an unincorporated village located in Gibson Township, Cameron County, Pennsylvania, United States. The village is not tracked by the U.S. Census Bureau.

== Geography ==
The village is somewhat remote and is located adjacent to Elk State Forest.

== Personalities ==
The village is most famous as the birthplace and childhood home of silent film actor Tom Mix (1880–1940). It is named after Tom Mix's great-great-grandfather, who founded the village.
