= Pine Tree Trail Natural Area =

Natural area in Pennsylvania

- Location within Pennsylvania
- Location: Elk County, Pennsylvania
- Nearest town: Dents Run
- Coordinates: 41°23′02″N 78°17′55″W
- Area: 276 acres (112 ha)

Pine Tree Trail Natural Area is a 276-acre (112 ha) protected area in Elk County, Pennsylvania, United States. It is part of Elk State Forest.

== Description ==
The Natural Area was established to protect an old-growth grove of white pine trees. Unusually, the area was clearcut and turned into a farm very early in the history of Pennsylvania logging industry, and then reforested naturally from cones blown in from nearby surviving trees. The current trees are about 170 years old, technically making them old-growth. The area is home to uncommon birds such as the black-throated green warbler, and some members of the Pennsylvania elk population have been seen. The Natural Area is accessed via various hiking trails with educational displays.
