= Elk Trail =

Hiking trail in Pennsylvania, United States

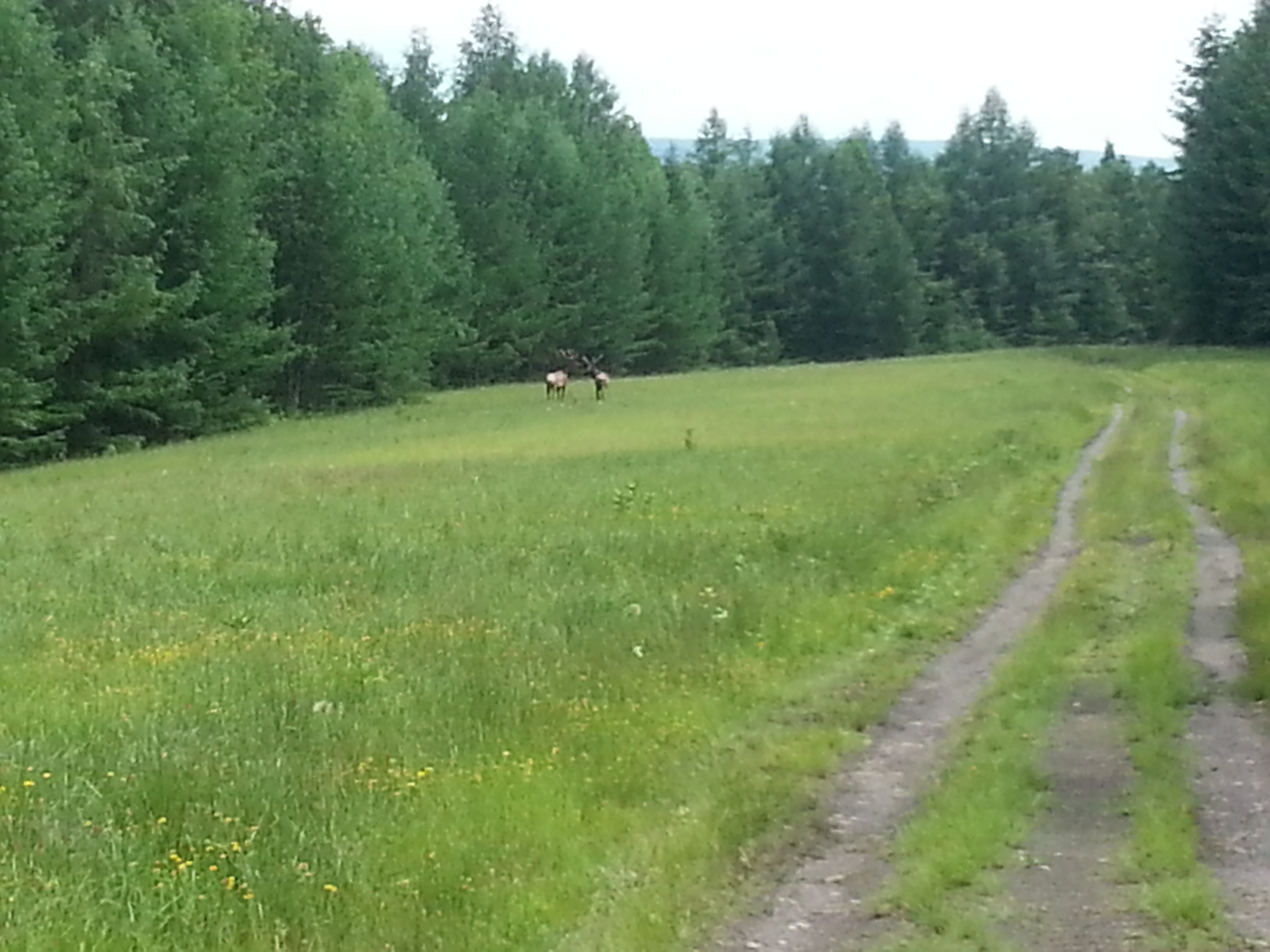
- Elk seen along the route of the Elk Trail in a reclaimed strip mine.
- Length: 15.6 mi (25.1 km)
- Location: Elk County, Pennsylvania, US
- Trailheads: Trout Run Road in Benezette, Dents Run Road west of Dents Run
- Use: Hiking
- Elevation change: Moderate
- Difficulty: Moderate
- Season: Year-round
- Hazards: Uneven and wet terrain, rattlesnakes, mosquitoes, ticks, black bears

The Elk Trail is a 15.6-mile (25.1 km) hiking trail in Elk State Forest in north-central Pennsylvania. Most of the trail is in Elk County, with about one-half of a mile straying across the border into Cameron County. The route mostly follows old gravel roads, with some newer footpath connectors, and the route was selected to increase the hiker's chance of seeing the region's resident elk population. The trail shares parts of its route with several mountain biking and equestrian trails. The trail is known for passing old resource extraction sites while encountering very few signs of modern civilization.

== History and route ==
The Elk Trail was developed in the 1990s as part of a tourism-oriented effort to increase awareness of the area's resident elk population. That animal is native to central Pennsylvania but went locally extinct in the 1850s. Some individuals were imported by train from Yellowstone National Park in 1912 to reestablish a local population. That population almost went locally extinct again in the 1950s due to over-hunting, but new management practices instituted by Pennsylvania officials enabled the region's elk to reach stable levels by the 1990s, after which visitors were invited to use trails and viewing areas to see the creatures in their natural habitat.

The western trailhead for the Elk Trail is found at the end of a dirt road on the north side of Benezette, near Trout Run. The trail proceeds northbound and follows Trout Run briefly then turns inland. At 1.1 miles it joins an old forestry road that rises to the top of the Allegheny Plateau and passes through several reclaimed strip mines that have been planted with grass to attract elk. At 4.3 miles the trail joins a footpath that descends into a hollow formed by Little Dents Run, then climbs over an intervening ridge and descends again to a crossing of Dents Run.

Now trending to the northeast, the trail rises again and stays at the top of the plateau for most of the rest of its distance, passing several meadows and old natural gas drilling sites, often on overgrown old access roads and one former logging railroad grade. In its middle segments, the trail trends first to the northeast and then to the southeast. At 14.6 miles the trail turns south into Little Bear Hollow (known as simply Bear Hollow downhill), following some footpaths and another old railroad grade steeply downhill parallel to Little Bear Run. At 15.6 miles the trail ends at a parking lot on the unpaved Dents Run Road, about two miles west of the village of Dents Run.
