= Bucktail Path =

Hiking trail in Elk State Forest, Pennsylvania, United States

Coordinates: 41.503324°N 78.121046°W

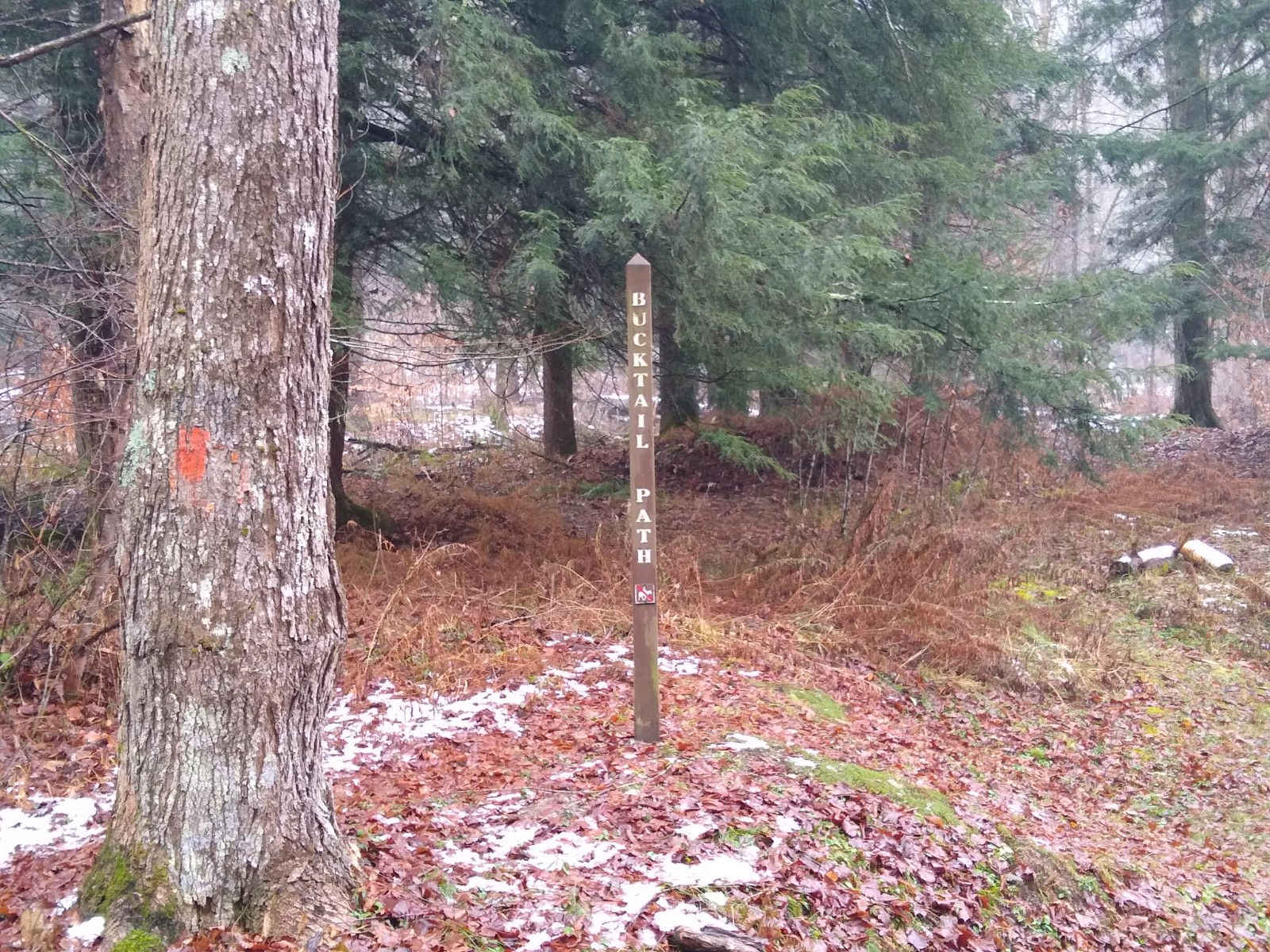
- The northern trailhead for the Bucktail Path, near Sizerville State Park
- Length: 33.5 mi (53.9 km)
- Location: Cameron County and Potter County, Pennsylvania, US
- Trailheads: Sizerville State Park, Sinnemahoning
- Use: Hiking
- Elevation change: High
- Difficulty: Strenuous
- Season: Year-round
- Hazards: Uneven and wet terrain, rattlesnakes, mosquitoes, ticks, black bears

The Bucktail Path is an approximately 34-mile (55 km) linear hiking trail in north-central Pennsylvania, United States, through portions of Elk State Forest. (Note: The southern end of the trail was rerouted in 2024 and its current distance is estimated.) Most of the trail is in Cameron County, with its northern end in Potter County. It should not be confused with the scenic highway in the same region known as Bucktail Trail; several features in the region were named after the Bucktail Regiment of local soldiers during the American Civil War.

The Bucktail Path is often described as one of the most isolated and least hiked backpacking trails in Pennsylvania, with a path that can be difficult to follow even for experienced hikers; and it has experienced long periods of under-use with little maintenance. It is also known for several challenging climbs and bridgeless stream crossings.

== Route ==
This description illustrates the Bucktail Path in the southbound direction. The trail begins at a parking lot on East Cowley Road just to the east of Sizerville State Park along the western edge of Potter County. The trail quickly climbs to the top of the Allegheny Plateau. After a partial descent, the trail walks along Crooked Run Road briefly then climbs to the top of the plateau again, utilizing a system of lengthy switchbacks remaining from old logging railroad grades.

The Bucktail Path enters Cameron County at 9.1 miles. It begins a lengthy walk alongside McNuff Branch at 9.7 miles, with several bridgeless crossings of that stream and its incoming tributaries for about the next four miles. The high valley formed by McNuff Branch has been noted for its scenery and isolation, with little evidence of human civilization but much evidence of centuries of beaver activity. At 13.7 miles, the trail crosses Hunts Run Road, climbs to the top of the plateau again then descends steeply to a crossing of Whitehead Road at 18.5 miles. This is followed by yet another steep climb to the top of the plateau, after which the trail stays on high ground until near its southern end.

The trail reaches Brooks Run Fire Tower at 23.9 miles; the tower is still used by forestry officials to spot fires, but it is fenced off to the public. At 25.8 miles, reach a junction with a trail that heads into Square Timber Wild Area. Starting at about 26 miles, the Bucktail Path was rerouted in 2024 to avoid a walk of several miles on a pipeline swath and a series of gravel roads toward the former southern terminus at Sinnemahoning. The trail was rerouted onto several previously existing paths that head east and northeast down the hollow of Lick Island Run, then up to a plateau-top, then down again to Brooks Run. The Bucktail Path now ends at Brooks Run Road near PA 872 and southern section of Sinnemahoning State Park.
