= Tom Mix Wash =

Stream in Pinal County, Arizona, United States

Coordinates: 32.8456°N 111.3131°W

Tom Mix Wash is a stream in Pinal County, Arizona, in the United States. The wash was named for Tom Mix, an American actor who was killed in a road accident in 1940 near the spot.

== See also ==
- List of rivers of Arizona
