= Dahoga, Pennsylvania =

Unincorporated community in Pennsylvania, US

- Unincorporated community
- Location within Pennsylvania
- Coordinates: 41°35′57″N 78°43′26″W
- Country: United States
- State: Pennsylvania
- County: Elk
- Township: Jones
- Elevation: 1,614 ft (492 m)
- Time zone: UTC-5 (Eastern (EST))
  - Summer (DST): UTC-4 (EDT)
- Area code: 814
- GNIS feature ID: 1209542

Dahoga is an unincorporated community in Jones Township in Elk County, Pennsylvania, United States. Dahoga is located along Pennsylvania Route 321, northwest of Wilcox.
