= Fred Woods Trail =

Hiking trail in Pennsylvania, United States

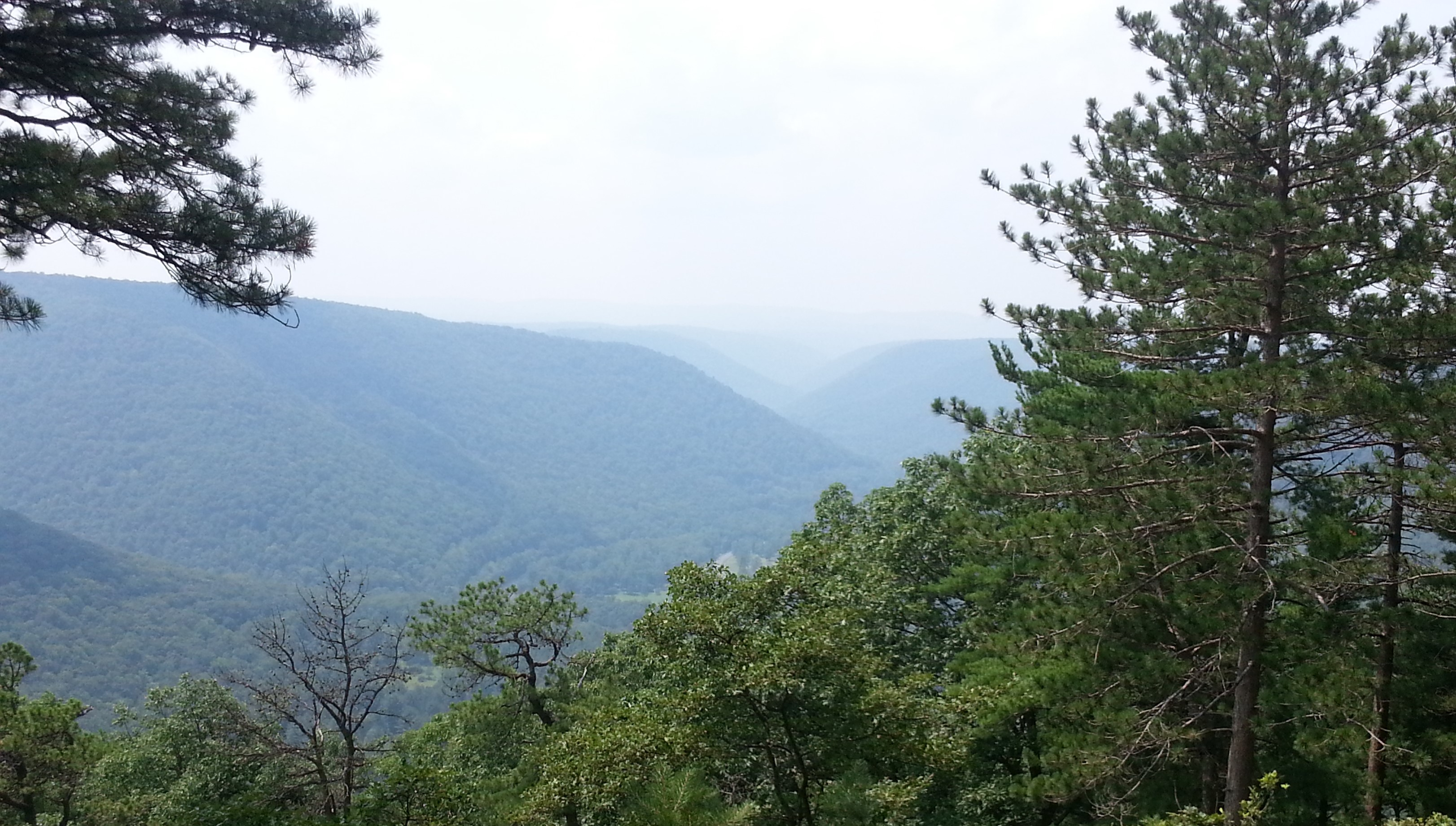
- Huckleberry Vista as seen from the Fred Woods Trail.
- Length: 4.5 mi (7.2 km)
- Location: Elk County, Pennsylvania, US
- Trailheads: Mason Hill Road near Driftwood, Pennsylvania
- Use: Hiking
- Elevation change: Low
- Difficulty: Moderate
- Season: Year-round
- Hazards: Uneven and wet terrain, rattlesnakes, mosquitoes, ticks, black bears

The Fred Woods Trail is a 4.5-mile (7.2 km) loop hiking trail in Elk State Forest in north-central Pennsylvania, United States. The trail visits three significant vistas over the valley of the Bennett Branch of Sinnemahoning Creek, and several large rock formations. The trail is known for requiring almost no climbing to reach its vistas on top of the Allegheny Plateau.

== History and route ==
The Fred Woods Trail was developed in 1981, to commemorate a forestry worker who had died in a heavy machinery accident in 1975. The trail was built by the Youth Conservation Corps, who expanded some previous undeveloped trails. The trailhead is reached by driving steeply uphill for 3.9 miles on the unimproved Mason Hill Road (known as Castle Garden Road on some maps) from Pennsylvania Route 555, at a junction about one mile west of Driftwood. The route consists of an entrance trail that must be completed in both directions, and a loop that can be completed in one direction. There is also a short spur called the Rock Trail that leads to additional scenic rock formations.

From Mason Hill Road, the hiker starts on the entrance trail and follows it southwest for 0.8 mile to a junction with the loop, at a large sign commemorating Mr. Fred Woods. Most hikers turn right here to follow the loop counter-clockwise. The first of many large rock formations, including several slot canyons and some small caves, is reached at 1.2 miles, and at 1.6 miles there is a junction with the Rock Trail which departs to the left and visits more such formations. At 1.8 miles, reach Water Plug Vista over the Bennett Branch and the parallel PA Route 555, which are more than one thousand feet below.

The trail remains near the edge of the canyon for a while, with nearly continuous views when the leaves are down. Reach another significant all-seasons view at Huckleberry Vista at 2.6 miles; the high plateau visible on the other side of the canyon is traversed by portions of the Quehanna Trail. There is one more vista toward Driftwood at 2.9 miles. The junction with the entrance trail is reached again at 3.7 miles; the hiker must repeat that segment to return to the trailhead after a total of 4.5 miles.
