= Wilcox, Pennsylvania =

Unincorporated community in Pennsylvania, US

- Census-designated place
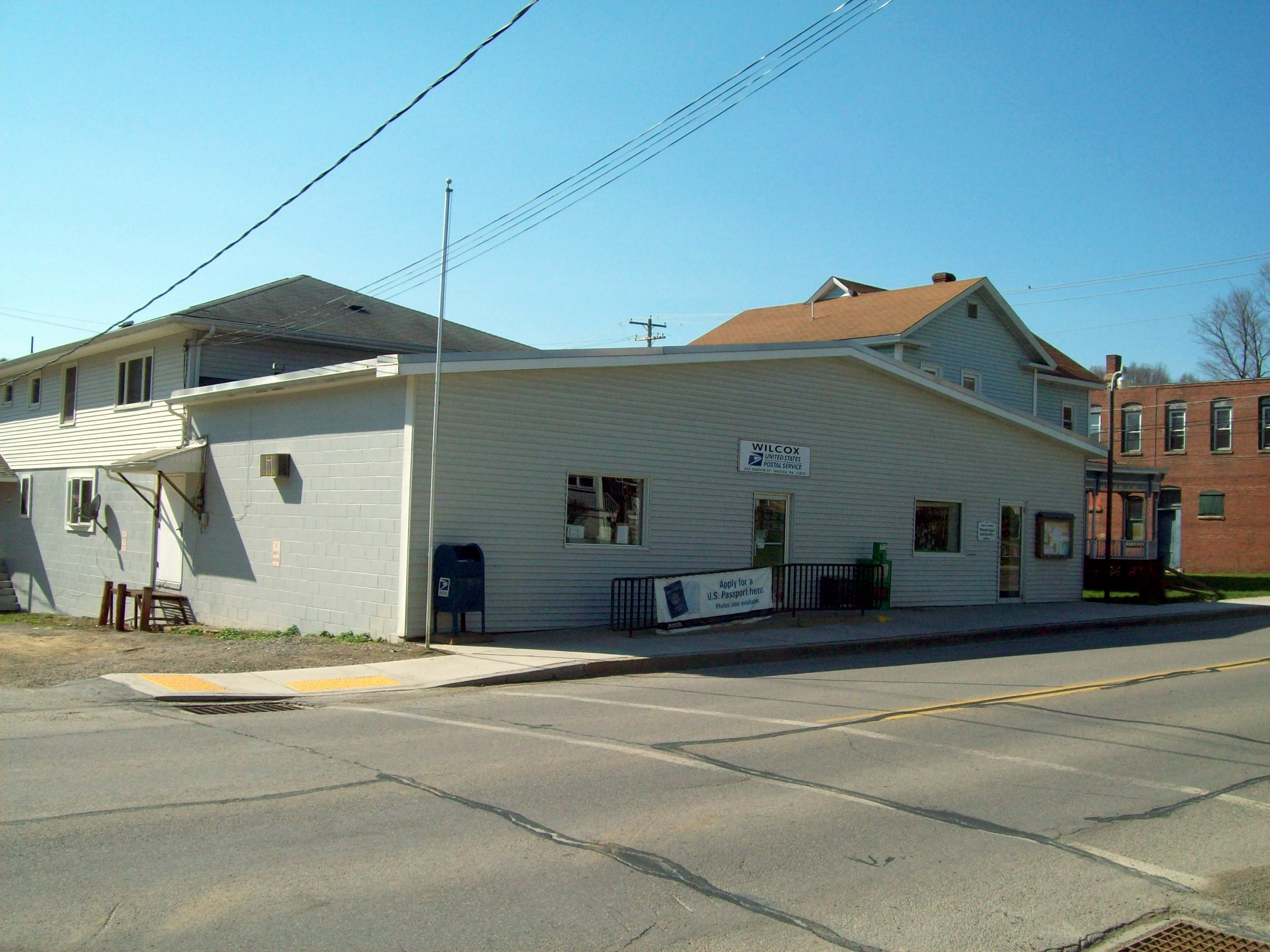
- U.S. Post Office and Jones Township Municipal Authority, Wilcox, Pennsylvania, April 2010

- Location within the U.S. state of Pennsylvania Wilcox (the United States)
- Coordinates: 41°34′32″N 78°41′18″W
- Country: United States
- State: Pennsylvania
- County: Elk
- Township: Jones

Area
  - Total: 0.50 sq mi (1.3 km^{2})
  - Land: 0.50 sq mi (1.3 km^{2})
  - Water: 0 sq mi (0.0 km^{2})
- Elevation: 1,526 ft (465 m)

Population (2020 census)
  - Total: 354
  - Density: 746/sq mi (288.2/km^{2})
- Time zone: UTC-5 (Eastern (EST))
  - Summer (DST): UTC-4 (EDT)
- ZIP code: 15870
- FIPS code: 42-85088
- GNIS feature ID: 1210116

Wilcox is a census-designated place located in Jones Township, Pennsylvania, United States. The community was named after a settler, Col. A.I. Wilcox. As of the 2020 census, Wilcox had a population of 354.

Wilcox is located in the west-central part of Jones Township in northern Elk County, in the valley of the West Branch of the Clarion River, a tributary of the Allegheny River. U.S. Route 219 passes through the center of town, leading north 29 miles (47 km) to Bradford and south 14 miles (23 km) to Ridgway, the Elk County seat. Pennsylvania Route 321 leads northwest from Wilcox 9 miles (14 km) to Kane. The Swedish Lutheran Parsonage located at 230 Kane Street was added to the National Register of Historic Places in 2005.

The year 2008 marked the 150th anniversary of the settlement of this village. Wilcox is located on the Allegheny Plateau near the East Branch Clarion River Lake. Over 250,000 visitors a year come to Wilcox to enjoy the natural foresting, fishing, hunting, and three state and national parks.

== See also ==
- List of census-designated places in Pennsylvania
