= Tom Mix =

American film actor (1880–1940)

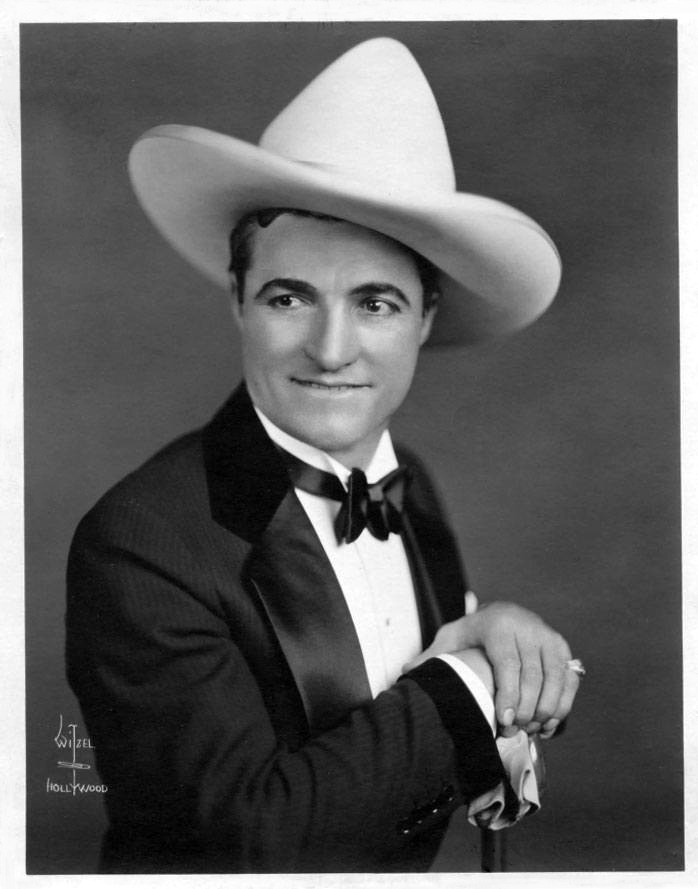
- Mix in 1925
- Born: Thomas Hezikiah Mix; January 6, 1880; Mix Run, Pennsylvania, U.S.
- Died: October 12, 1940 (aged 60); Florence, Arizona, U.S.
- Other name: Thomas Edwin Mix
- Occupation: Actor
- Years active: 1909–1935
- Spouses: Grace I. Allin (m. 1902; ann. 1903) Kitty Jewel Perinne (m. 1905; div. 1906) Olive Stokes (m. 1909; div. 1917) Victoria Forde (m. 1918; div. 1932) Mabel Hubbell Ward (m. 1932)
- Children: 2; including Ruth

Thomas Edwin Mix (born Thomas Hezikiah Mix; January 6, 1880 – October 12, 1940) was an American film actor and the star of many early Western films between 1909 and 1935. He appeared in 291 films, all but nine of which were silent films. He was one of Hollywood's first Western stars and helped define the genre as it emerged in the early days of the cinema.

== Early years ==
Thomas Hezikiah Mix was born January 6, 1880, in Mix Run, Pennsylvania, about 42 miles (68 km) north of State College, to Edwin Elias Mix and Elizabeth Heistand. He grew up in nearby DuBois, where his father, a stablemaster for a wealthy lumber merchant, taught him to ride and love horses. He spent time working on a local farm owned by John DuBois, a lumber businessman.

In April 1898, during the Spanish–American War, Mix enlisted in the Army under the name Thomas E. (Edwin) Mix. His unit never went overseas, and Mix later failed to return for duty after an extended furlough when he married Grace I. Allin on July 18, 1902. Mix was listed as AWOL on November 4, 1902, but was never court-martialed. His marriage to Allin was annulled after one year. In 1905, Mix married Kitty Jewel Perinne, and this marriage also ended within a year. He next married Olive Stokes on January 10, 1909, in Medora, North Dakota. On July 13, 1912, Olive gave birth to their daughter Ruth.

In 1905, Mix rode in President Theodore Roosevelt's inaugural parade with a group of 50 horsemen led by Seth Bullock, which included several former Rough Riders. Years later, Hollywood publicists muddled this event to imply that Mix had been a Rough Rider himself.

Mix went to Oklahoma and lived in Guthrie, working as a bartender and other odd jobs. He was briefly night marshal of Dewey, in 1911. He worked at the Miller Brothers 101 Ranch, one of the largest ranching businesses in the United States, covering 101,000 acres (41,000 ha), hence its name. The ranch had its own touring Wild West show in which Mix appeared. He stood out as a skilled horseman and expert shot, winning national riding and roping contests at Prescott, Arizona, in 1909, and Canon City, Colorado, in 1910.

Mix was a Freemason.

== Film career ==
=== Selig Polyscope ===
Mix in Mr. Logan, U.S.A., 1919

Mix began his film career as a supporting cast member with the Selig Polyscope Company. His first appearance was in a short film, The Cowboy Millionaire, released on October 21, 1909. In 1910, he appeared as himself in a short documentary film, Ranch Life in the Great Southwest, in which he displayed his skills as a cattle wrangler. Shot in Dewey, Oklahoma with Selig studio cameramen, the film was a success, and Mix became an early motion picture star.

Mix performed in more than 100 films for Selig, many of which were filmed in Las Vegas, New Mexico. While with Selig he co-starred in several films with Victoria Forde, and they fell in love. He divorced Olive Stokes in 1917. By then, Selig Polyscope had encountered severe financial difficulties, and Mix and Forde both subsequently signed with Fox Film Corporation, which had leased the Edendale studio. They married in 1918 and had a daughter, Thomasina (Tommie) Mix, in February 1922. As a result of Mix's schedule of making six to ten movies per year, and his refusal to let her visit him while he was working, they lived apart during much of their marriage. However, she would often promote his films.

Tom Mix acting with Eva Novak in the 1922 film Sky High

=== Transfer to Fox and Mixville ===
Tom Mix and Tony entertain children on the Ellipse near the Washington Monument. (May 21, 1925)

Soon after his departure from Selig in 1917, Mix opted to work for the Fox Film Corporation. Fox head William Fox, who liked that Mix did his own stunts, would quickly sign him. Initially paid $350 a week by Fox, Mix's transition to the studio soon proved successful, with the studio's solid financial footing playing to a much wider audience than his Selig movies could get. According to the Dewey, Oklahoma-based Tom Mix Museum, "the wider exposure afforded by Fox undoubtedly contributed to Tom's move from a simply prolific actor to genuine world famous movie star".

Mix made more than 160 cowboy films throughout the 1920s. These featured action-oriented scripts contrasted with the documentary style of his work with Selig. Heroes and villains were sharply defined and a clean-cut cowboy always saved the day. Millions of American children grew up watching his films on Saturday afternoons. His horse, "Tony the Wonder Horse", also became a celebrity. Mix did his own stunts and was frequently injured.

In 1913, Mix moved his family to a ranch he purchased in Prescott named Bar Circle A Ranch. Some of his movies were filmed in his Prescott home. During this time, Mix had success in the local Prescott Frontier Days rodeo, which claims to be the "world's oldest rodeo". In 1920, he took first prize in a bull-riding contest. The Bar Circle A Ranch has been developed into a planned community called Yavapai Hills, where there is a street named Bar Circle A Road.

Mix's salary at Fox reached $7,500 a week. Gossip columnist Louella Parsons wrote that he had his initials in electric lights on the top of his house. Eventually, his salary at Fox would reach $17,500 a week. His performances were realistic with action stunts, horseback riding, attention-grabbing cowboy costumes, and showmanship. At the Edendale lot, Mix built a 12-acre (4.9 ha) shooting set called Mixville. Loaded with western props and furnishings, it has been described as a "complete frontier town, with a dusty street, hitching rails, a saloon, jail, bank, doctor's office, surveyor's office, and the simple frame houses typical of the early Western era". Near the back of the lot an Indian village of lodges was ringed by miniature plaster mountains. The set also included a simulated desert, a large corral, and (to facilitate interior shots) a ranch house with no roof.

Despite his successful film career, Mix opted to return to performing for the 101 Wild West Show in the mid-1920s when he wasn't making films for Fox. By 1927, low budget imitations of Mix's films spread, which led to Fox further losing interest in keeping him. In addition, Fox grew weary of using high budgets for Mix's films and paying him high salaries and wanted to instead focus more on transitioning to sound films. Mix would part ways with Fox in 1928. Following his departure from Fox, Mix did a vaudeville tour with the Keith-Albee-Orpheum circuit. Mix threatened to move to Argentina to make films or to join the circus, but agreed to return to Hollywood in July 1928 and signed with FBO. However, he only made five films with FBO and soon left after salary disputes with FBO studio head Joseph P. Kennedy. He called Kennedy, who had also acquired a controlling stake in Keith-Albee-Orpheum shortly before Mix joined FBO, a "tight-assed, money-crazy son of a bitch"; Kennedy would only pay Mix just over half of what he made at while at Fox.

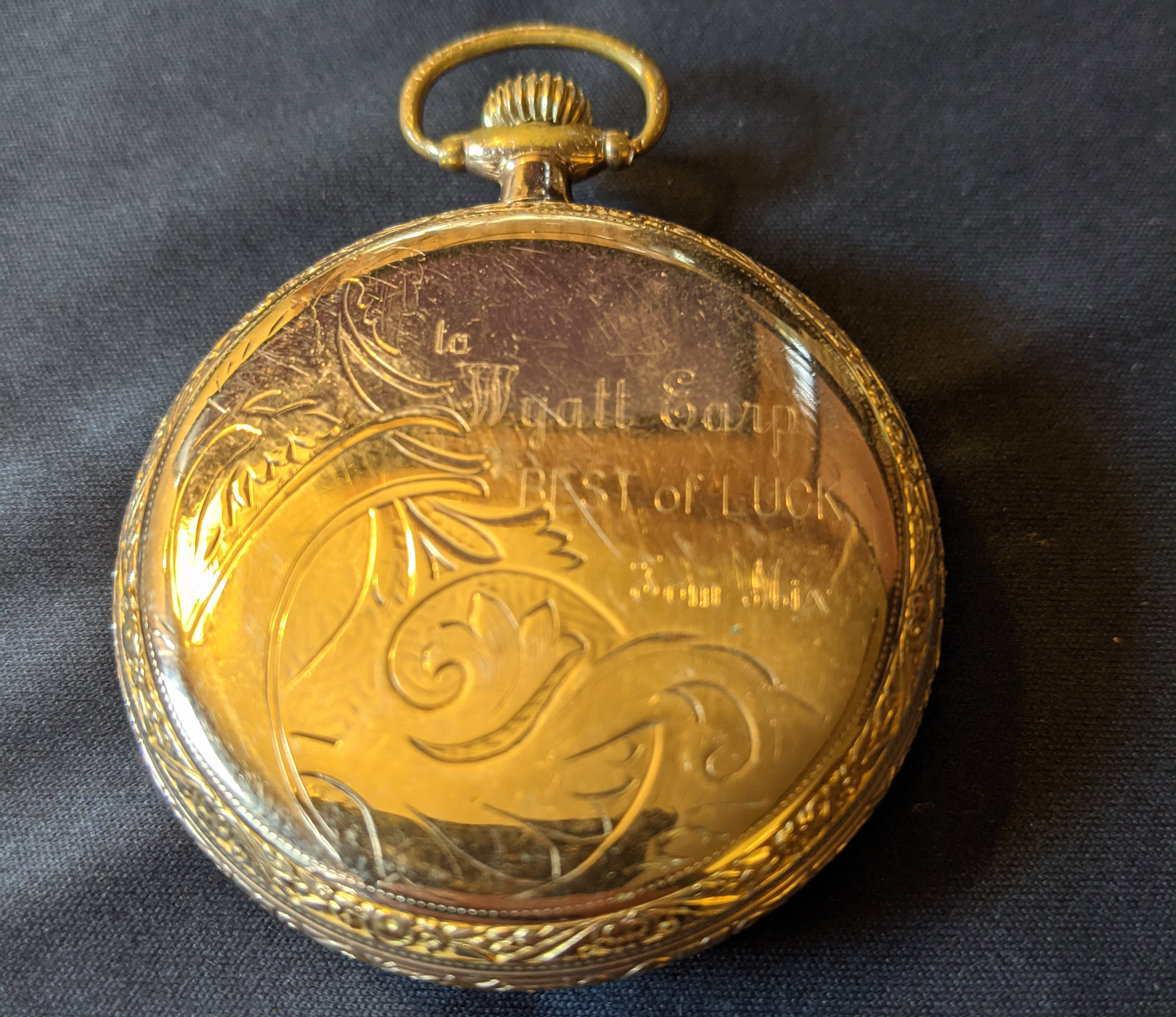
Obverse of pocket watch given to Wyatt Earp by Tom Mix

Mix became friends with Wyatt Earp, who lived in Los Angeles and occasionally visited Hollywood western movie sets. He was a pallbearer at Earp's funeral in January 1929. The newspapers reported that Mix cried during his friend's service.

By 1929, Mix was past his prime and undergoing marital difficulties. His fourth wife Victoria was already spending his money heavily, taking their daughter Thomasina for an extended European vacation. Victoria kept spending money as though Tom were bringing it in as fast as ever, which was not the case. Shortly after signing with the Sells Floto Circus, Mix was charged with tax evasion for the year 1925–1927. Despite the fact that there was never any evidence to indicate that Mix was the instigator, or even aware, of the faulty filings, Mix nevertheless signed the forms, which had been prepared by his accountant, and eventually paid a hefty fine. This incident would tarnish his good guy image. By the end of 1929, Mix, whose big salaries as an entertainer also led to him being one of the biggest spenders in the entertainment industry, would lose not only the great majority of his fortune, but also his Arizona ranch and his Hollywood mansion in the aftermath of the 1929 stock market crash.

=== 1930s ===
Mix appeared with the Sells-Floto Circus in 1929, 1930, and 1931 at a reported weekly salary of $20,000 (equivalent to $375,000 in 2025). Meanwhile, the Great Depression (along with the actor's continuous free-spending ways and alimony payments to his many wives) reportedly wiped out most of his savings.

Mix and Forde divorced in 1931, and in 1932, he married his fifth wife, Mabel Hubbell Ward.

Carl Laemmle of Universal Pictures approached him in 1932 with an offer to perform in a series of sound features, with the contract including script and cast approval. He acted in nine films for Universal, but he called a halt to the series because of injuries he received while filming. Mix also made guest appearances in Paramount's Hollywood on Parade short subjects in 1932 and 1933; the all-star series was a charity venture to benefit the Motion Picture Relief Fund.

Around 1933, Mix appeared with the Sam B. Dill circus, which he reportedly bought two years later (in 1935).

Mix's last screen appearance was a 15-episode sound Mascot Pictures serial, The Miracle Rider (1935), in which he played a Texas Ranger. For the four weeks of filming he received $40,000 (which he needed to support his new circus venture) and the film earned more than one million dollars -- exceptionally successful for a serial. Outdoor action sequences for the production were filmed primarily on the Iverson Movie Ranch in Chatsworth, California, on the outskirts of Los Angeles. The site was known for its huge sandstone boulders, and one of them later became known as "Tom Mix Rock" when it was discovered it had been used in The Miracle Rider. In one episode, Mix was filmed descending from the top of the rock, with boot holes carved into it to assist him in making the descent. The rock and the boot holes, although unmarked, is in the Garden of the Gods park in Chatsworth.

Also in 1935, Texas governor James V. Allred named Mix an honorary Texas Ranger.

Mix returned to circus performing, working with his eldest daughter Ruth Jane Mix, who had also appeared in some of his films. In 1938, he went to Europe on a promotional trip, leaving Ruth behind to manage the circus. Without him, however, the circus soon failed, and he later excluded her from his will.

Mix had reportedly made over $6 million (equivalent to $141 million in 2025) during his 26-year film career, but nevertheless would have much of this fortune vanish due to, in large part, the 1929 stock market crash and the excessive amount of spending undertaken by him and his fourth wife.

== Radio ==
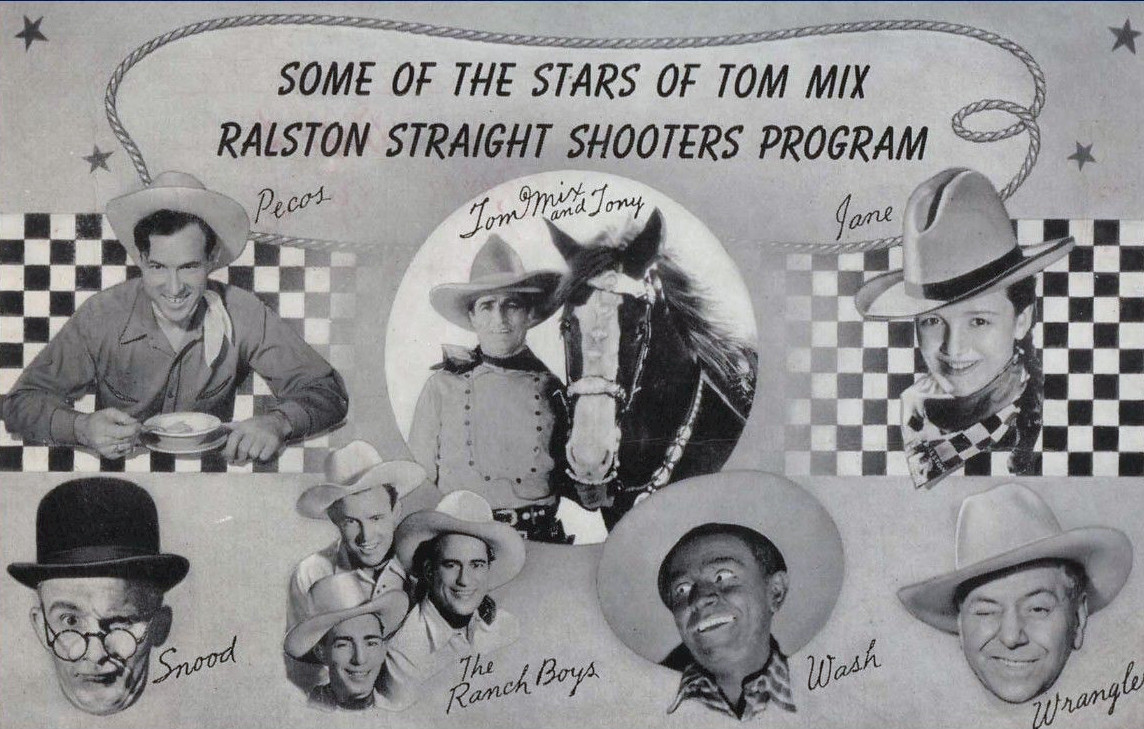
Postcard sent in response to an entry for a radio program contest in 1941

In 1933, Ralston Purina obtained Mix's permission to produce the children's radio series Tom Mix Ralston Straight Shooters, which aired between 1933 and 1951, though the series did not air for one year during WW2. Mix never appeared on these broadcasts due to his voice being deemed unfit for broadcast due to several serious injuries over the years, and the radio series survived over a decade after Mix's 1940 death. On radio, Mix was played by radio actors: Artells Dickson (early 1930s), Jack Holden (from 1937), Russell Thorsen (early 1940s) and Joe "Curley" Bradley (from 1944). Others in the supporting cast included George Gobel, Harold Peary and Willard Waterman. The radio show originally aired on the Blue Network, but later moved to distribution through the Mutual Broadcasting System, and varied from 15 to 30 minutes and airing three or five times a week over its run.

The Ralston company offered ads during the radio program for listeners to send in for a series of 12 special Ralston–Tom Mix comic books, available only by writing the Ralston Company by mail.

Most of Mix's radio work has been lost over the years. Recordings exist of only approximately 30 scattered episodes, and none of the series arcs that typified the show survive in full.

== Death ==
Mix memorial plaque

On October 12, 1940, after visiting Pima County Sheriff Ed Echols in Tucson, Arizona, Mix was killed while he was taking a detour 18 miles (29 km) south of Florence, Arizona. He drove his bright-yellow Cord Phaeton into a gully to avoid a closed bridge, and the sudden stop caused a heavy aluminum suitcase located behind him to be propelled into his head, breaking his neck and causing his death almost instantly. He was 60 years old.

His funeral took place at the Little Church of the Flowers in Glendale, California, on October 16, 1940, and was attended by thousands of people. He is buried in the Forest Lawn Memorial Park Cemetery.

A small stone memorial marks the site of his death on State Route 79, and the nearby gully is known as "Tom Mix Wash". The marker bears the inscription: "In memory of Tom Mix, whose spirit left his body on this spot and whose characterization and portrayals in life served to better fix memories of the old West in the minds of living men."

With his death, a judge gave away many of Mix's personal belongings to a neighbor.

== Legacy ==
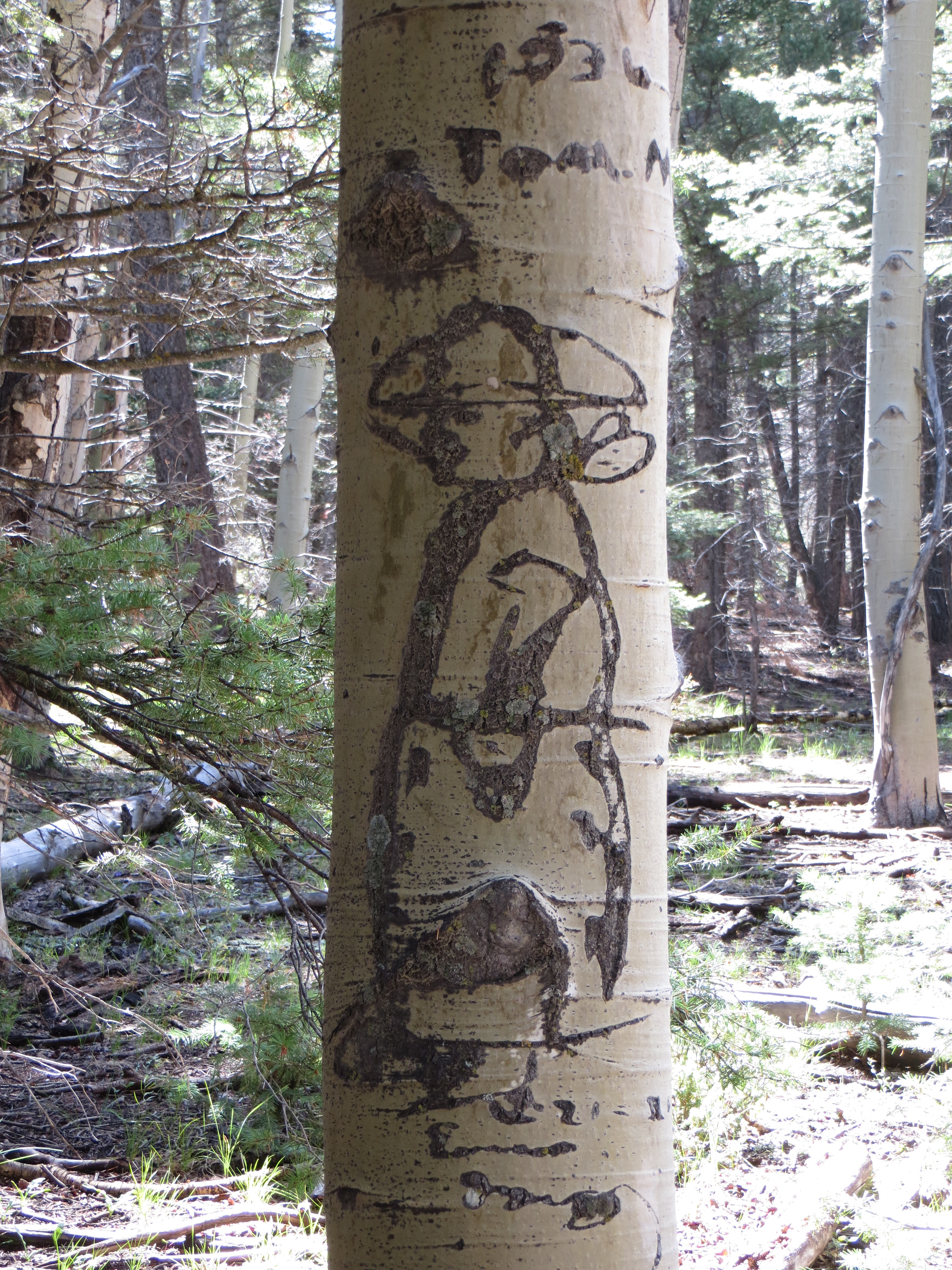
Portrait in aspen tree of Tom Mix, dated 1936. Known as "arborglyphs", such carvings were made by young Basque and Irish American shepherds. (Santa Fe National Forest, Río Arriba County, New Mexico)

Tom Mix was the acknowledged "King of Cowboys" when Ronald Reagan and John Wayne were young, and the influence of his screen persona can be seen in their approach to portraying cowboys. When an injury caused football player Marion Morrison (later known as John Wayne) to drop out of the University of Southern California, Mix helped him find work moving props in the back lot of Fox Studios. That was the beginning of Wayne's Hollywood career.

Mix made 292 movies throughout his career. As of 2001, only about 10% of these were known to be available for viewing, though it is unclear how many are now considered lost films. The 1937 Fox vault fire lost most of the archive of his films made with Fox.

For his contribution to the motion picture industry, Mix has a star on the Hollywood Walk of Fame at 1708 Vine Street. His cowboy boot prints, palm prints and the hoof prints of his horse, Tony, are at Grauman's Chinese Theatre, at 6925 Hollywood Boulevard. In 1958 Mix was inducted posthumously into the Western Performers Hall of Fame at the National Cowboy & Western Heritage Museum in Oklahoma City, Oklahoma. In 1959, a "Monument to the Stars" was erected on Beverly Drive (where it intersects Olympic Boulevard and becomes Beverwil) in Beverly Hills. The memorial consists of a bronze-green spiral of sprocketed "camera film" above a multi-sided tower, embossed with full-length likenesses of early stars who appeared in famous silent movies. Those memorialized include Douglas Fairbanks, Mary Pickford, Will Rogers, Conrad Nagel, Rudolph Valentino, Fred Niblo, Harold Lloyd, and Mix. There is also a Tom Mix museum in Dewey, Oklahoma. Opening in 1965, and still operational as of 2025, the Tom Mix Museum in Dewey – which was also where his third wife Olive was raised and the birthplace of his eldest daughter Ruth – managed to obtain many of Mix's personal items. Additionally, from 1986 to 2002 there existed another museum in his birthplace of Mix Run, Pennsylvania. Between 1980 and 2004, 21 Tom Mix festivals were held during the month of September, most of them in DuBois, Pennsylvania.

== Comic book appearances ==
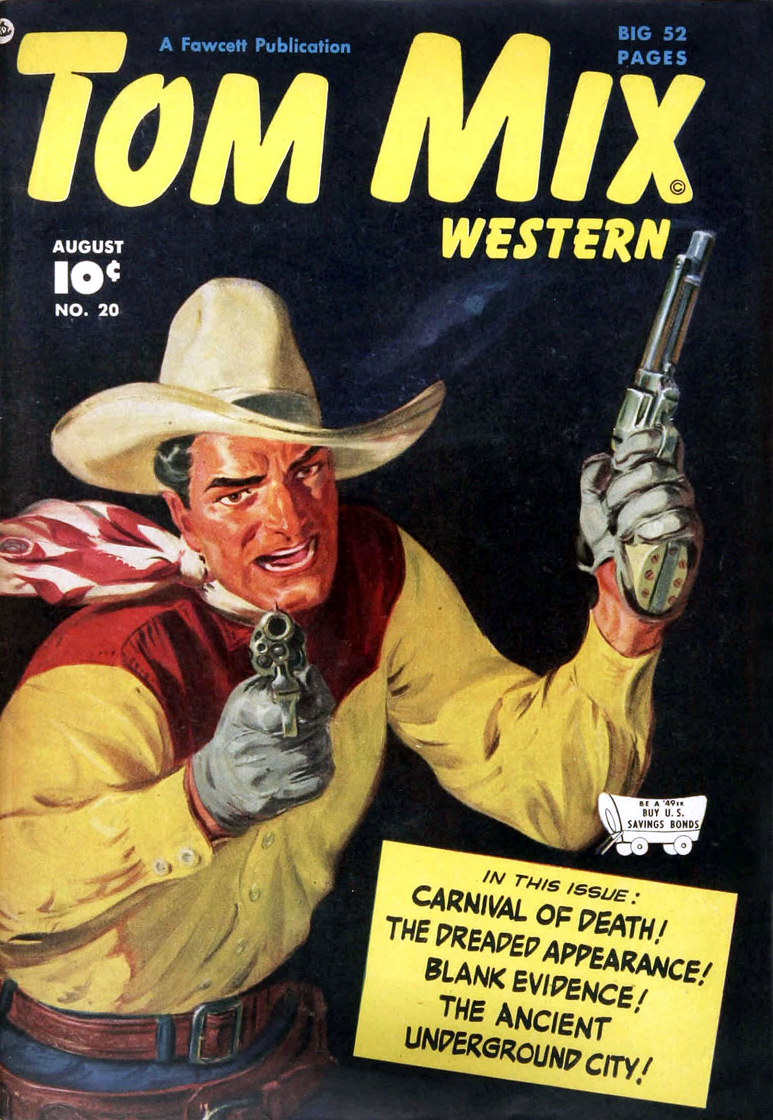
Tom Mix Western, Fawcett Comics, August 1949. Artwork by Norman Saunders.

Tom Mix was often portrayed in comic books, primarily during the heyday of Western-themed comics, the 1940s and 1950s.

He was first featured in 11 issues of Dell Comics' The Comics from 1937 to 1938.

Ralston Purina, a sponsor of the radio series, produced nine issues of Tom Mix Comics in 1940–1941, and three issues of Tom Mix Commandos Comics in 1942. The 36-page comics were available by mail order, for two boxtops of any Ralston cereal.

Fawcett Comics published 61 issues of Tom Mix Western from 1948 to 1953.

Comics featuring Tom Mix were also published in Sweden, Germany, Canada, Australia, and Great Britain, including L. Miller & Son's Tom Mix Western Comics, which ran 85 issues from 1948 to 1951.
