= Jones Township, Pennsylvania =

Township in Pennsylvania, United States

Coordinates: 41°37′31″N 78°29′58″W

- Township
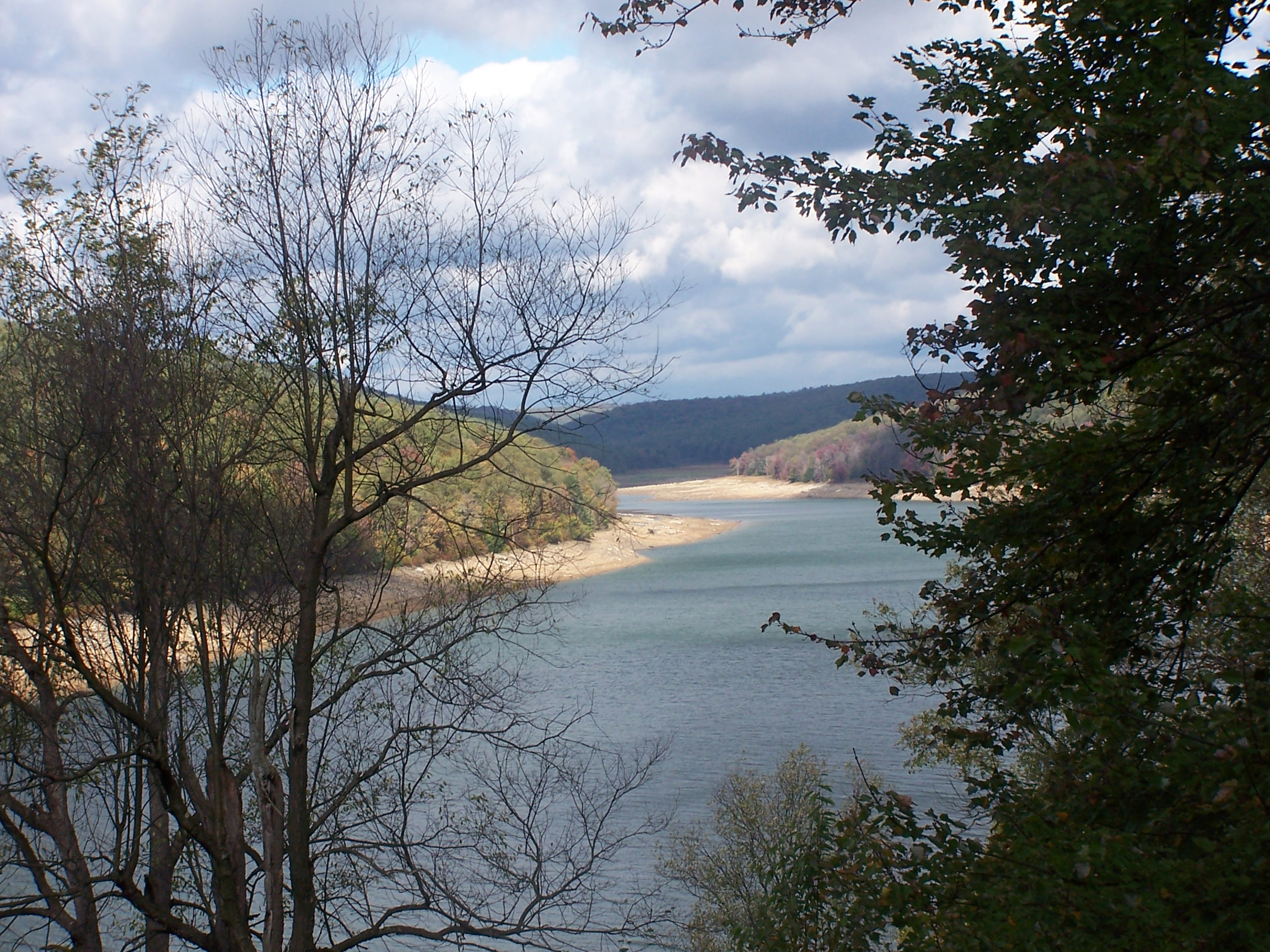
- East Branch Clarion River Lake

- Location in Elk County and the state of Pennsylvania.
- Country: United States
- State: Pennsylvania
- County: Elk
- Incorporated: Before 1843

Government
  - Type: Board of Supervisors
  - Chairman: Fred Maletto, III
  - Vice-chair: Jeff Roberts
  - Secretary: Laurie Storrar

Area
  - Total: 147.09 sq mi (380.96 km^{2})
  - Land: 145.15 sq mi (375.93 km^{2})
  - Water: 1.95 sq mi (5.04 km^{2})

Population (2020)
  - Total: 1,569
  - Estimate (2022): 1,548
  - Density: 10.81/sq mi (4.174/km^{2})
- ZIP code: 15870
- Area code: 814
- FIPS code: 42-047-38368
- Website: www.jonestownship.com

Jones Township is a township in Elk County, Pennsylvania, United States. The population was 1,569 at the 2020 census, down from 1,624 in 2010. Bendigo State Park and part of Elk State Park are in Jones Township, on the East Branch of the Clarion River.

== History ==
The Swedish Lutheran Parsonage at Wilcox was added to the National Register of Historic Places in 2005.

== Geography ==
According to the United States Census Bureau, the township has a total area of 145.2 square miles (376.0 km^{2}), of which 144.9 square miles (375.2 km^{2}) is land and 1.9 square miles (5.0 km^{2}), or 1.32%, is water.

Jones Township is bordered by McKean County to the north, Cameron County to the east, the city of St. Marys and Ridgway Township to the south and Highland Township to the west. The unincorporated communities of Wilcox, Dahoga, Lamont, Rasselas, Midmont, Streights, Tambine, Ketner, and Glen Hazel are located within Jones Township.

== Demographics ==
Historical population
Census	Pop.	Note	%±
2000	1,721		—
2010	1,624		−5.6%
2020	1,569		−3.4%
2022 (est.)	1,548		−1.3%
U.S. Decennial Census

As of the census of 2000, there were 1,721 people, 687 households, and 480 families residing in the township. The population density was 11.8 people per square mile (4.6 people/km^{2}). There were 1,175 housing units at an average density of 8.1 units per square mile (3.1 units/km^{2}). The racial makeup of the township was 99.54% White, 0.06% African American, 0.12% Native American, 0.12% from other races, and 0.17% from two or more races. Hispanic or Latino of any race were 0.29% of the population.

There were 687 households, out of which 29.3% had children under the age of 18 living with them, 60.6% were married couples living together, 5.2% had a female householder with no husband present, and 30.1% were non-families. 26.5% of all households were made up of individuals, and 11.9% had someone living alone who was 65 years of age or older. The average household size was 2.50 and the average family size was 3.07.

In the township the population was spread out, with 23.1% under the age of 18, 6.3% from 18 to 24, 27.8% from 25 to 44, 27.3% from 45 to 64, and 15.5% who were 65 years of age or older. The median age was 41 years. For every 100 females, there were 109.4 males. For every 100 females age 18 and over, there were 109.2 males.

The median income for a household in the township was $39,663, and the median income for a family was $48,077. Males had a median income of $37,353 versus $20,446 for females. The per capita income for the township was $18,479. About 2.5% of families and 4.9% of the population were below the poverty line, including 5.4% of those under age 18 and 6.7% of those age 65 or over.

== Education ==
Most of Jones Township is in Johnsonburg Area School District while a portion in the northwest is in Kane Area School District.
