= Seventy One =

Seventy One Garner Run

Physical characteristics
- Source
  - location: top of a hill in St Marys, Elk County, Pennsylvania
  - elevation: between 2,000 and 2,020 feet (610 and 620 m)
- Mouth
  - location: Elk Creek in St Marys, Elk County, Pennsylvania
  - coordinates: 41°25′21″N 78°38′01″W
  - elevation: 1,486 ft (453 m)
- Length: 3.0 mi (4.8 km)
- Basin size: 2.33 mi^{2} (6.0 km^{2})
- Discharge
  - average: 1.26 million US gallons per day (1.95 cu ft/s; 0.055 m^{3}/s)

Basin features
- Progression: Elk Creek → Clarion River → Allegheny River → Ohio River → Mississippi River → Gulf of Mexico
- Tributaries
  - right: two unnamed tributaries

Seventy One (also known as Garner Run) is a tributary of Elk Creek in Elk County, Pennsylvania, in the United States. It is approximately 3.0 miles (4.8 km) long and flows through St Marys. The watershed of the stream has an area of 2.33 square miles (6.0 km^{2}). The amounts of aluminum and iron in the stream are too small to be detectable. However, there are detectable amounts of manganese, acidity, and alkalinity in the stream. A portion of the stream's watershed is part of a greenway. A coal bed also is found near it.

== Course ==
Seventy One begins at the top of a hill in St Marys. It flows southeast for a short distance before turning south-southwest for several tenths of a mile. It then receives an unnamed tributary from the right and then turns south-southwest for several tenths of a mile, entering a valley. The stream then receives another unnamed tributary and turns south for more than a mile. At the end of its valley, it crosses a railroad line and reaches its confluence with Elk Creek.

Seventy One joins Elk Run 7.48 miles (12.04 km) upstream of its mouth.

=== Tributaries ===
Seventy One has no named tributaries. However, it does have two unnamed tributaries. The first is approximately 0.6 miles (0.97 km) long and joins the stream in its upper reaches. The second is also approximately 0.6 miles (0.97 km) long.

== Hydrology ==
The concentrations and daily loads of aluminum and iron in the waters of Seventy One at its mouth are too low to be detectable. However, the daily load of manganese is 0.1 pounds (0.045 kg) per day and the concentration is 0.01 milligrams per liter. It requires no reduction to meet the stream's total maximum daily load requirements. The daily load of acidity in the stream is 130.1 pounds (59.0 kg) per day and the acidity concentration is 12.43 milligrams per liter. It requires a reduction of 67 percent to meet the stream's total maximum daily load requirements. The pH of the stream is between 5.5 and 6.1. The daily load of alkalinity is 86.5 pounds (39.2 kg).

The average discharge of Seventy One at its mouth is 1.26 million gallons per day.

== Geography and geology ==
The elevation near the mouth of Seventy One is 1,486 feet (453 m) above sea level. The elevation near the stream's source is between 2,000 and 2,020 feet (610 and 620 m) above sea level.

A coal bed known as the Alton Upper Bed occurs in the vicinity of Seventy One, on the stream's western side.

== Watershed ==
The watershed of Seventy One has an area of 2.33 square miles (6.0 km^{2}). The mouth of the stream is in the United States Geological Survey quadrangle of Ridgway. However, its source is in the quadrangle of St Marys.

A portion of the watershed of Seventy One is in a greenway known as the Elk Creek Natural System Greenway Corridor.

== History ==
Seventy One was entered into the Geographic Names Information System on August 2, 1979. Its identifier in the Geographic Names Information System is 1199966.

== See also ==
- List of rivers of Pennsylvania
