= Elk State Forest =

State forest in Pennsylvania, United States

- IUCN category VI (protected area with sustainable use of natural resources)
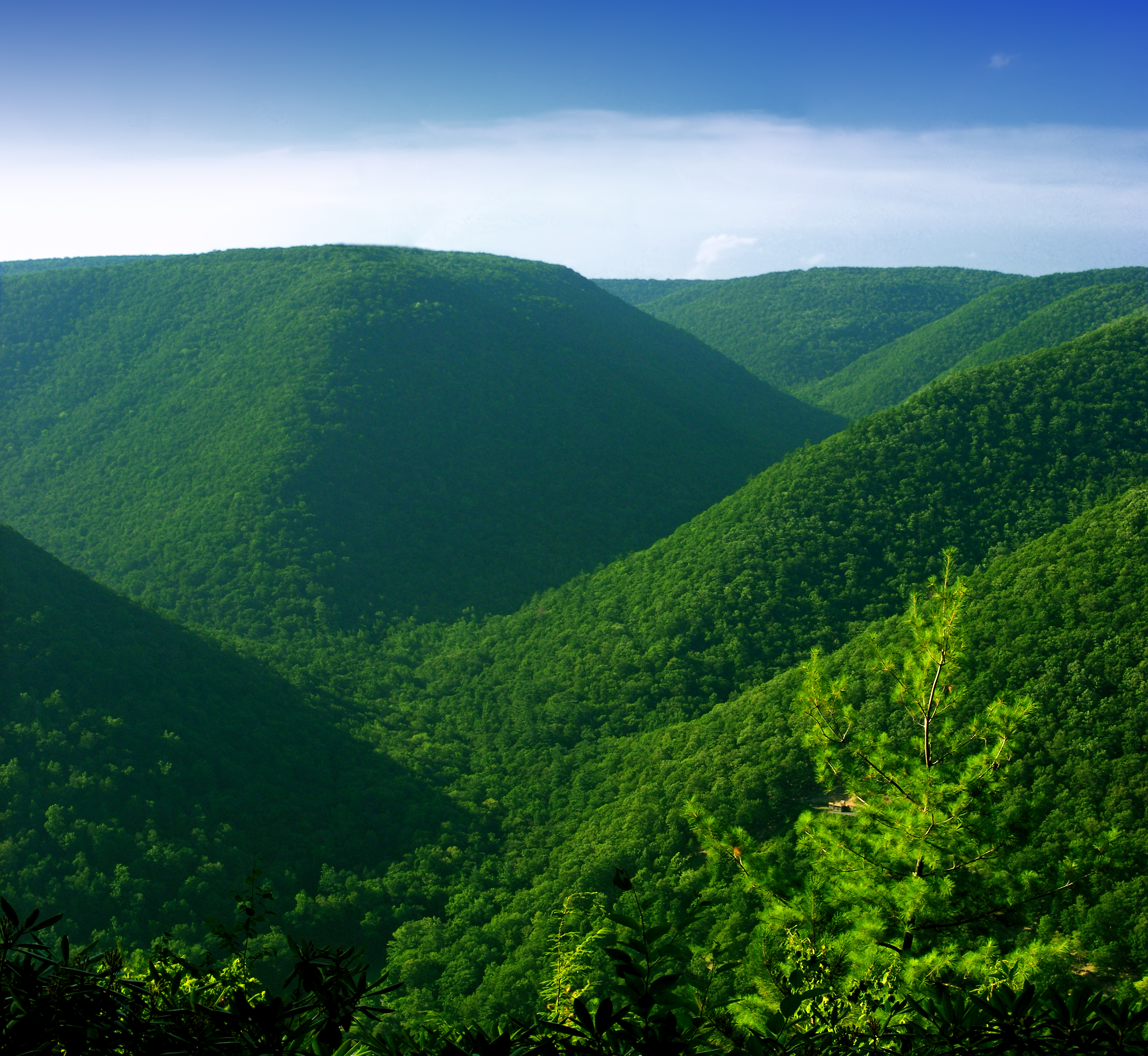
- Jerry Ridge Vista, Elk State Forest, in Cameron and Clinton Counties

- Location within Pennsylvania
- Location: Pennsylvania, United States
- Coordinates: 41°20′00″N 78°17′29″W
- Area: 200,000 acres (810 km^{2})
- Elevation: 1,686 ft (514 m)
- Established: 1900
- Governing body: Pennsylvania Department of Conservation and Natural Resources
- Website: Elk State Forest

Elk State Forest is a Pennsylvania State Forest in Pennsylvania Bureau of Forestry District #13. The main offices are located in Emporium in Cameron County, Pennsylvania.

The forest is located on 200,000 acres (80,940 ha), chiefly in Cameron and Elk counties, with small parts of the forest also in Clinton, McKean and Potter counties. Major hiking trails in Elk State Forest include the Bucktail Path and the Quehanna Trail. Other trails include the Fred Woods Trail and the Elk Trail.

== History ==
The history of Elk State Forest is very similar to that of the other state forests in Pennsylvania. The land was primarily acquired from lumber companies during the early 20th century. Vast stands of old-growth forest had been harvested by the lumber companies during the mid-to-late 19th century. The earliest lumbering operations harvested the largest of the white pines for use in the shipbuilding industry. The tall and straight timbers were ideally suited for use as ships masts and spars. The logs were lashed together with rope and floated down the tributaries of the West Branch Susquehanna River and into the river on their way to the shipyards of Baltimore. Once the white pines were gone the lumbermen turned to the hemlock for use as lumber. Sawmills and lumber camps sprang up throughout what is now Elk State Forest. Much of the timber was floated down Driftwood Branch, First Fork and Bennett's Branch to the West Branch Susquehanna River and into the Susquehanna Boom near Williamsport. The lumber era in the area of Elk State Forest lasted until 1915 when the last raft was floated down the Driftwood Branch.

The departure of the lumber companies left a forest that was described as a vast wasteland of tree stumps and dried treetops. Sparks cast off by passing steam trains ignited wildfires that slowed the growth of the thriving second growth forest of hardwoods that is now Elk State Forest. The formation of the Civilian Conservation Corps during the Great Depression by President Franklin D. Roosevelt was key to the revitalization of the forests of Elk State Forest. The young men of the CCC cleared the forest and streams of the dried underbrush that was the fuel for the devastating wildfires. Nine CCC camps spread throughout the forest worked to build roads, trail and bridges throughout Elk State Forest. They also fought the periodic wildfires. On October 19, 1938, during a wildfire near Pepperhill to the north of Sinnamanhoning, eight young men from the CCC lost their lives when they were trapped on a steep hillside while fighting the raging fire. The Wayside Memorial Spring south of Emporium on Pennsylvania Route 120 in Bucktail State Park Natural Area is maintained as an honor to the men who lost their lives battling forest fires for the CCC.

== Elk herd ==
Elk State Forest is named for the animal elk (wapiti). Although native to Pennsylvania and the area, the last wild elk in Pennsylvania was killed in 1867 near Ridgway. Elk from the Rocky Mountains were reintroduced to the area between 1913 and 1926 and the herd today has over 600 animals. This is up from a low of just 35 elk counted in the 1970s. Their range is mostly in southeastern Elk and southwestern Cameron counties. The Pennsylvania Game Commission is responsible for maintaining the elk herd in Elk State Forest and the surrounding area. In an effort to keep the herds away from agricultural areas the game commission maintains the forest in a way that suits the feeding needs of the elk. Scattered tracts of trees in the forest have been sold to lumber companies. The forest that grows in place of the harvested timber provides a variety of browse that is needed by the elk. The game commission also maintains sections of grassy areas in various locations throughout Elk State Forest providing further variety in feed for the elk.

Visitors to Elk State Forest may chance upon an elk especially during the mating season which occurs in September and October. All visitors are encouraged to keep a safe distance from any elk, but especially the bull elk who can be very dangerous during the rutting season.

== Neighboring state forest districts ==
- Susquehannock State Forest (north)
- Sproul State Forest (east)
- Moshannon State Forest (south)
- Clear Creek State Forest (southwest)
- Cornplanter State Forest (west)

== Nearby state parks ==
- Elk State Park
- Bucktail State Park Natural Area
- Sizerville State Park
- Sinnemahoning State Park

== Natural and wild areas ==
- Bucktail State Park Natural Area
- Johnson Run Natural Area
- Lower Jerry Run Natural Area
- M.K. Goddard/Wykoff Run Natural Area
- Pine Tree Trail Natural Area
- Quehanna Wild Area
- Square Timber Wild Area
