= Swedish Lutheran Parsonage (Wilcox, Pennsylvania) =

- U.S. National Register of Historic Places
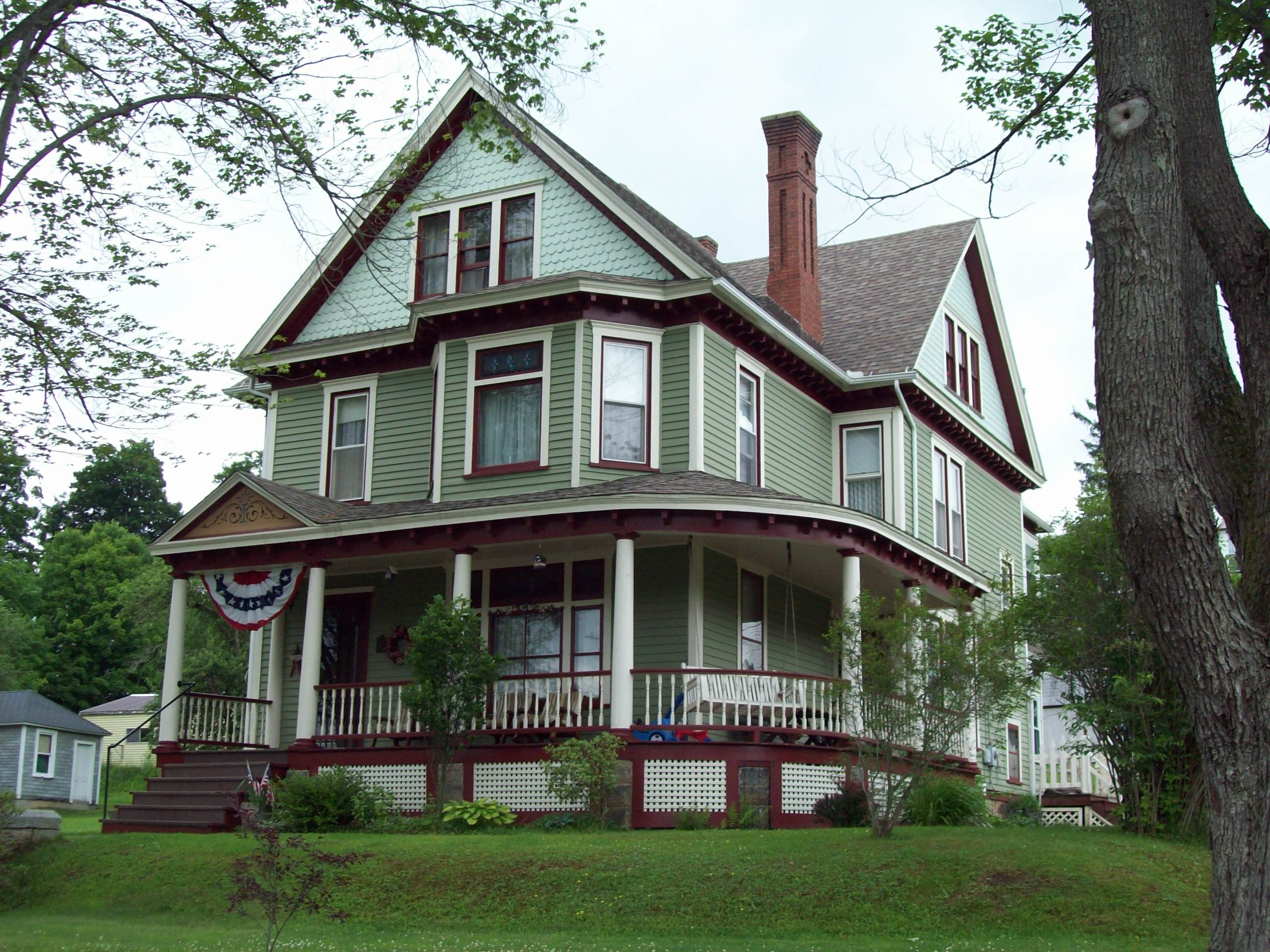
- Swedish Lutheran Parsonage, June 2009

- Location within Pennsylvania Location within the United States
- Location: 230 Kane Street Wilcox, Jones Township, Pennsylvania
- Coordinates: 41°34′34″N 78°41′14″W
- Area: less than one acre
- Built: 1901
- Architectural style: Queen Anne
- NRHP reference No.: 05000099
- Added to NRHP: February 24, 2005

Swedish Lutheran Parsonage is a historic church parsonage at 230 Kane Street Wilcox in Jones Township, Elk County, Pennsylvania. It was built in 1901 in the Queen Anne style.

It was added to the National Register of Historic Places in 2005.
