= Benezette Township, Pennsylvania =

Township in Pennsylvania, United States

Coordinates: 41°14′30″N 78°19′59″W

- Township
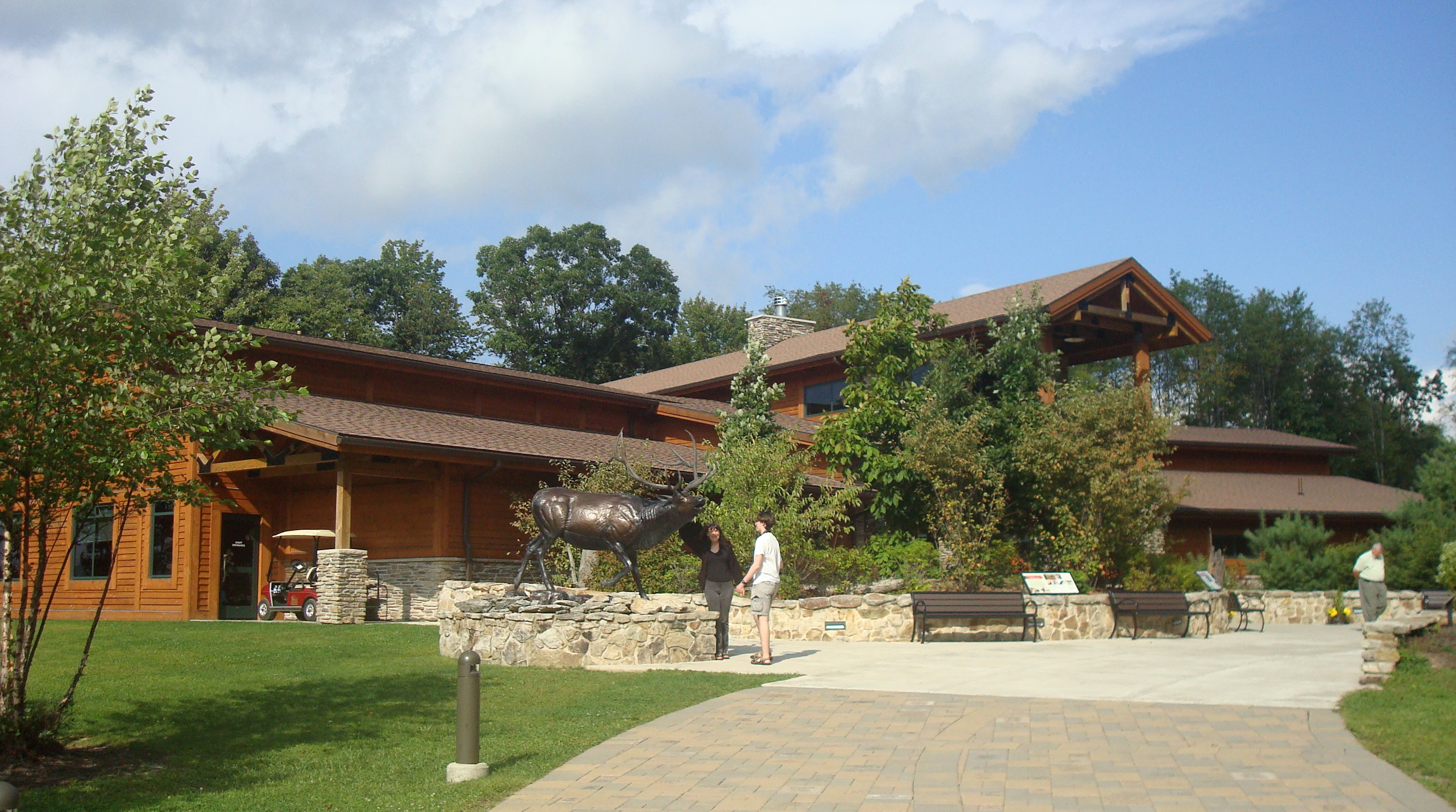
- The Elk Country Visitor's Center in Benezette (2014)

- Logo

- Location in Elk County and the state of Pennsylvania
- Country: United States
- State: Pennsylvania
- County: Elk
- Incorporated: Before 1843

Area
  - Total: 107.16 sq mi (277.54 km^{2})
  - Land: 106.67 sq mi (276.27 km^{2})
  - Water: 0.49 sq mi (1.27 km^{2})

Population (2020)
  - Total: 217
  - Estimate (2022): 214
  - Density: 2.03/sq mi (0.785/km^{2})
- Postal code: 15821
- Area code: 814
- FIPS code: 42-047-05576
- Website: benezettetwp.com

Benezette Township is a township in Elk County, Pennsylvania, United States. The population was 217 at the 2020 census, up from 207 in 2010.

The township has its own post office, with zip code 15821.

== Geography ==
Benezette Township occupies the eastern end of Elk County, and is bordered by Cameron County to the north and east, and by Clearfield County to the south. According to the United States Census Bureau, the township has a total area of 107.1 square miles (277.5 km^{2}), of which 106.7 square miles (276.3 km^{2}) is land and 0.50 square miles (1.3 km^{2}), or 0.46%, is water.

The township contains the unincorporated communities of Medix Run, Benezette, Summerson, Grant, and Dents Run, all in the valley of the Bennett Branch Sinnemahoning Creek, which flows northeasterly across the center of the township. Pennsylvania Route 555 follows the creek valley, leading east to Driftwood and west to Weedville. Ridgway, the Elk County seat, is 27 miles (43 km) to the northwest.

== Demographics ==
Historical population
Census	Pop.	Note	%±
2000	227		—
2010	207		−8.8%
2020	217		4.8%
2022 (est.)	214		−1.4%
U.S. Decennial Census

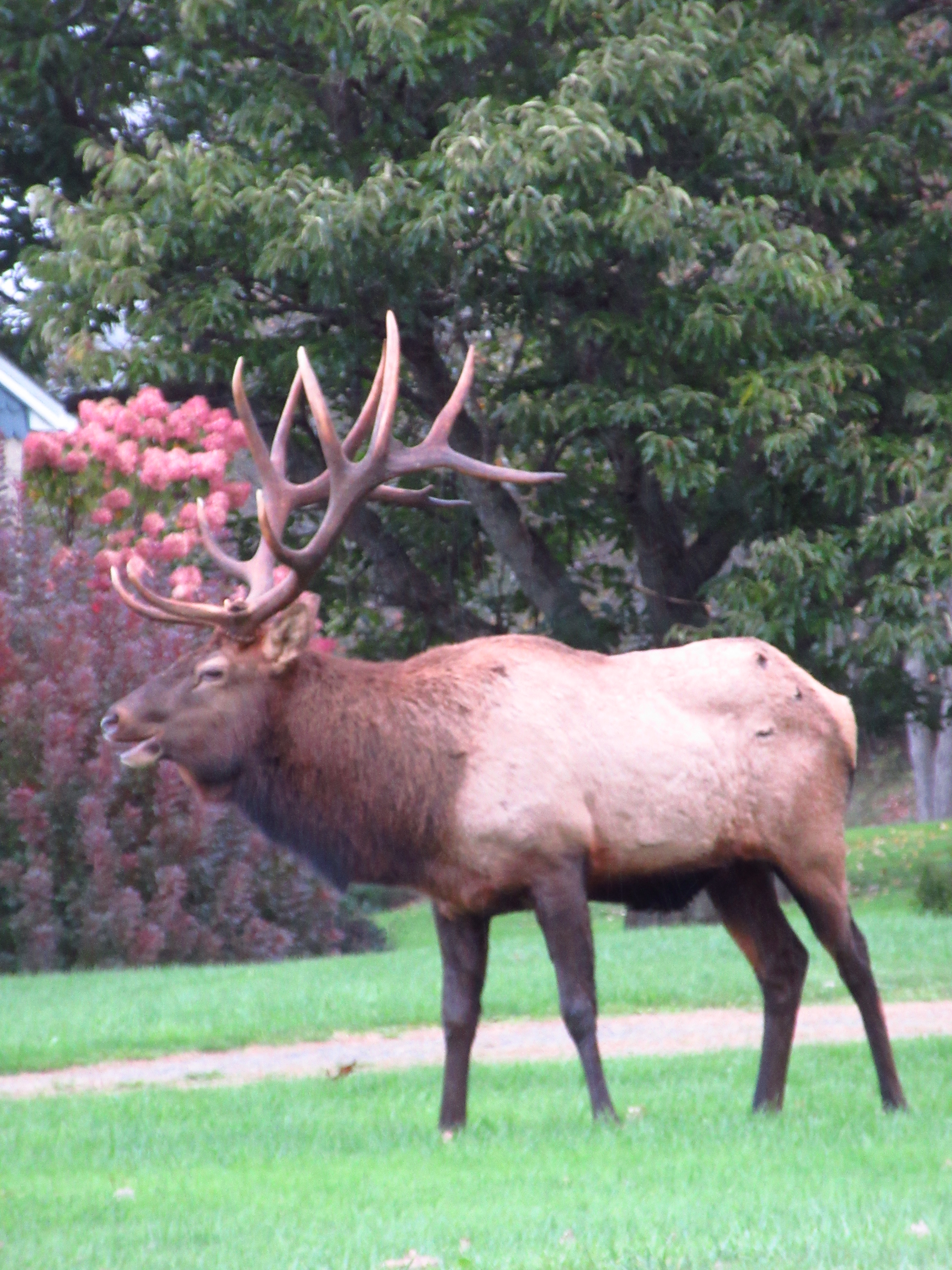
Elk can frequently be observed in the yards of Benezette residents.

As of the census of 2000, there were 227 people, 104 households, and 66 families residing in the township. The population density was 2.1 people per square mile (0.8/km^{2}). There were 867 housing units at an average density of 8.1/sq mi (3.1/km^{2}). The racial makeup of the township was 96.48% White and 3.52% Asian. Hispanic or Latino of any race were 0.88% of the population.

There were 104 households, out of which 18.3% had children under the age of 18 living with them, 52.9% were married couples living together, 6.7% had a female householder with no husband present, and 35.6% were non-families. 33.7% of all households were made up of individuals, and 14.4% had someone living alone who was 65 years of age or older. The average household size was 2.18 and the average family size was 2.75.

In the township the population was spread out, with 15.9% under the age of 18, 6.2% from 18 to 24, 26.4% from 25 to 44, 31.3% from 45 to 64, and 20.3% who were 65 years of age or older. The median age was 46 years. For every 100 females, there were 90.8 males. For every 100 females age 18 and over, there were 89.1 males.

The median income for a household in the township was $33,542, and the median income for a family was $36,071. Males had a median income of $36,875 versus $23,125 for females. The per capita income for the township was $18,282. About 5.4% of families and 7.0% of the population were below the poverty line, including 5.4% of those under the age of 18 and 4.7% of those 65 or over.
