= Sinnemahoning, Pennsylvania =

Unincorporated community in Pennsylvania, US

- Unincorporated community
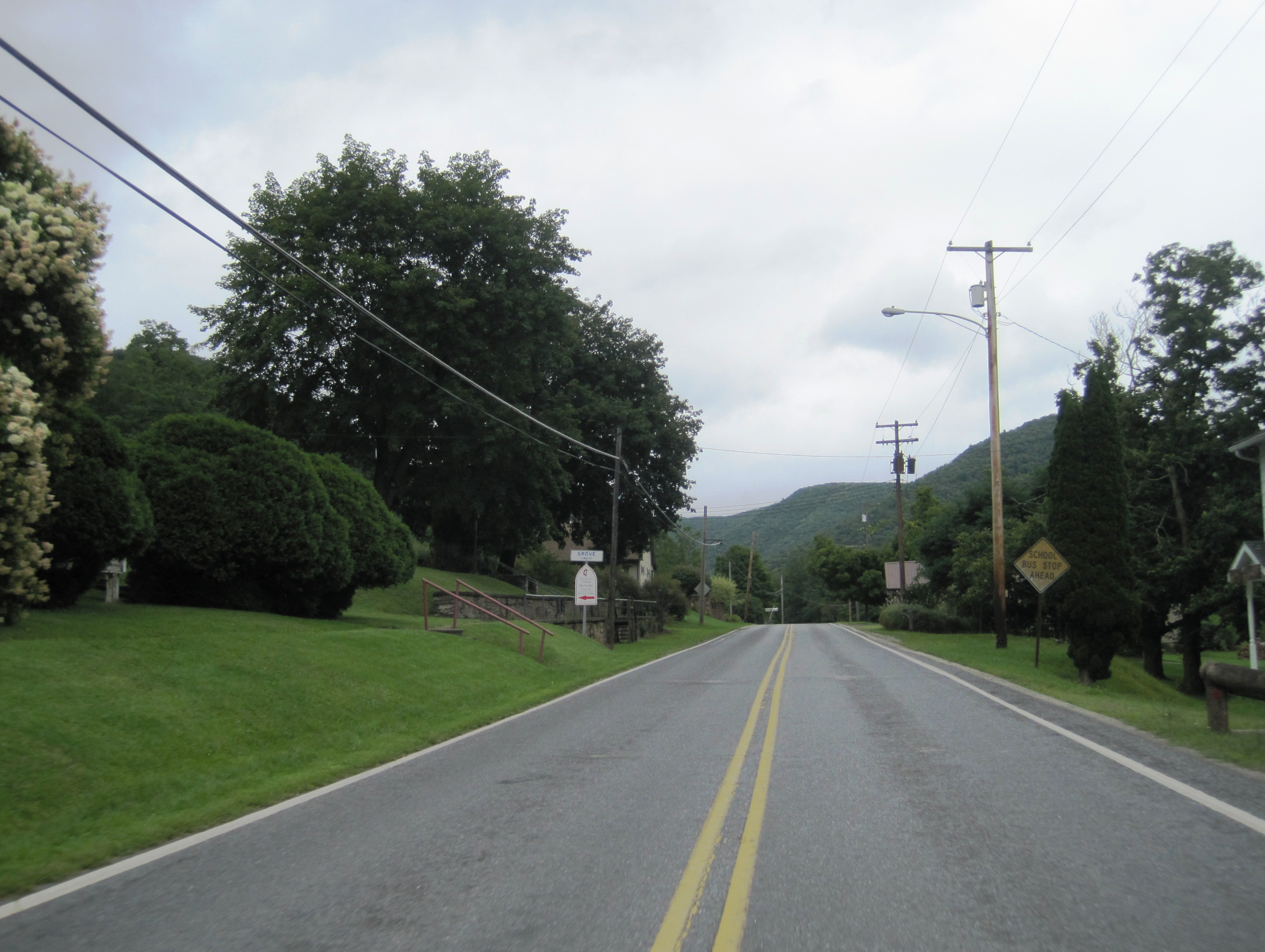
- PA 120 eastbound in Sinnemahoning

- Location within Pennsylvania Location within the United States
- Coordinates: 41°19′09″N 78°05′47″W
- Country: United States
- State: Pennsylvania
- County: Cameron
- Township: Gibson, Grove
- Elevation: 801 ft (244 m)
- Time zone: UTC-5 (Eastern (EST))
  - Summer (DST): UTC-4 (EDT)
- ZIP code: 15861
- Area code: 814
- GNIS feature ID: 1187723

Sinnemahoning, also known as Sinnamahoning, is an unincorporated community in Cameron County, Pennsylvania, United States. The community is located along Sinnemahoning Creek and Pennsylvania Route 120, 2.4 miles (3.9 km) southeast of Driftwood. Sinnemahoning has a post office with ZIP code 15861.

== Demographics ==
Historical population
Census	Pop.	Note	%±

The United States Census Bureau defined Sinnemahoning as a census designated place (CDP) in 2023.
