= Dents Run, Pennsylvania =

Unincorporated community in Pennsylvania, US

- Unincorporated community
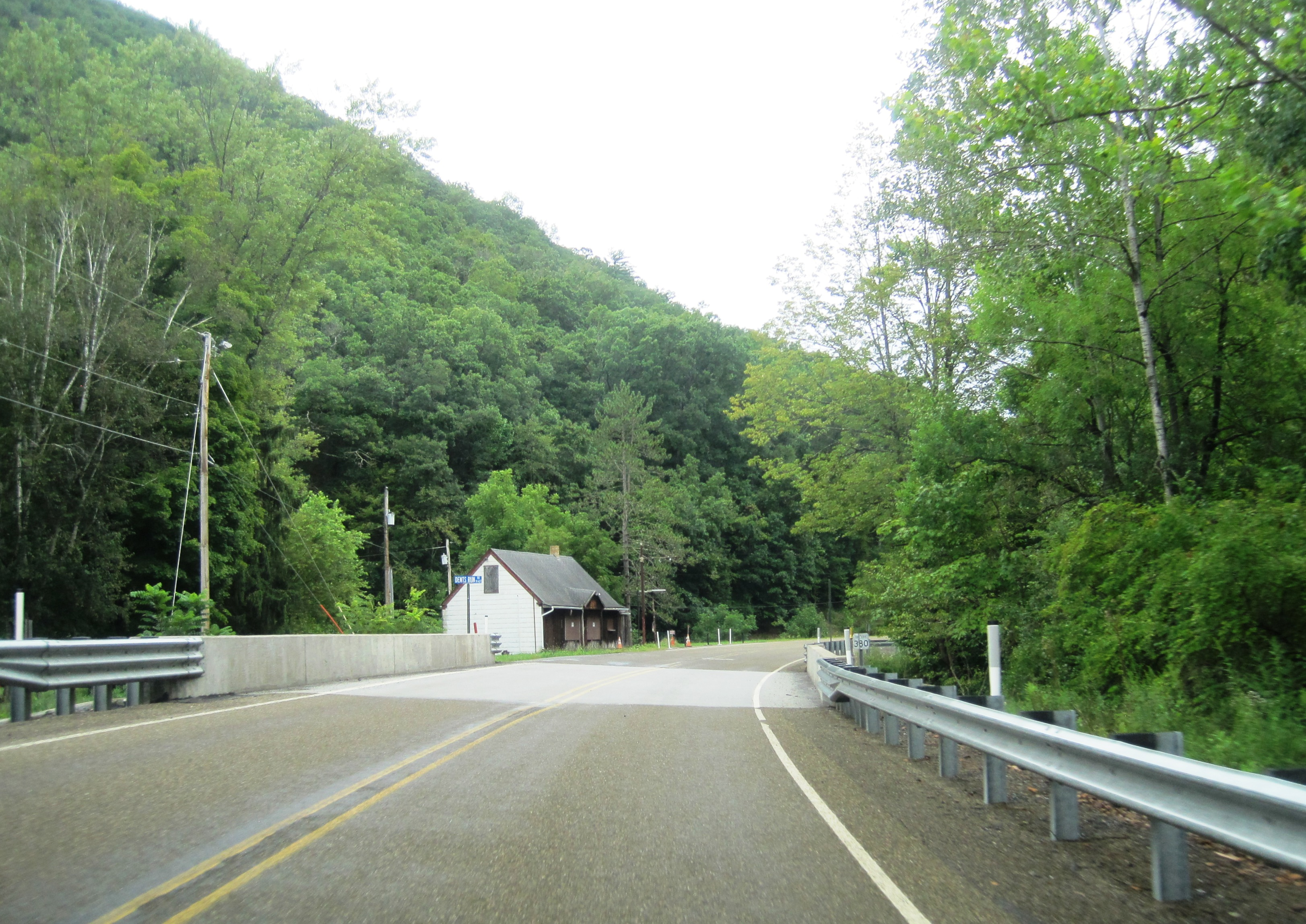
- PA 555 eastbound in Dents Run

- Location within Pennsylvania
- Coordinates: 41°21′29″N 78°16′02″W
- Country: United States
- State: Pennsylvania
- County: Elk
- Elevation: 922 ft (281 m)
- Time zone: UTC-5 (Eastern (EST))
  - Summer (DST): UTC-4 (EDT)
- Area code: 814
- GNIS feature ID: 1173167

Dents Run is an unincorporated community in Benezette Township, Elk County, Pennsylvania, United States. It has attracted attention from treasure hunters and the media as the reputed site of a lost shipment of gold. The FBI conducted excavation activities in Dents Run in 2018.
