= East Branch Clarion River Lake =

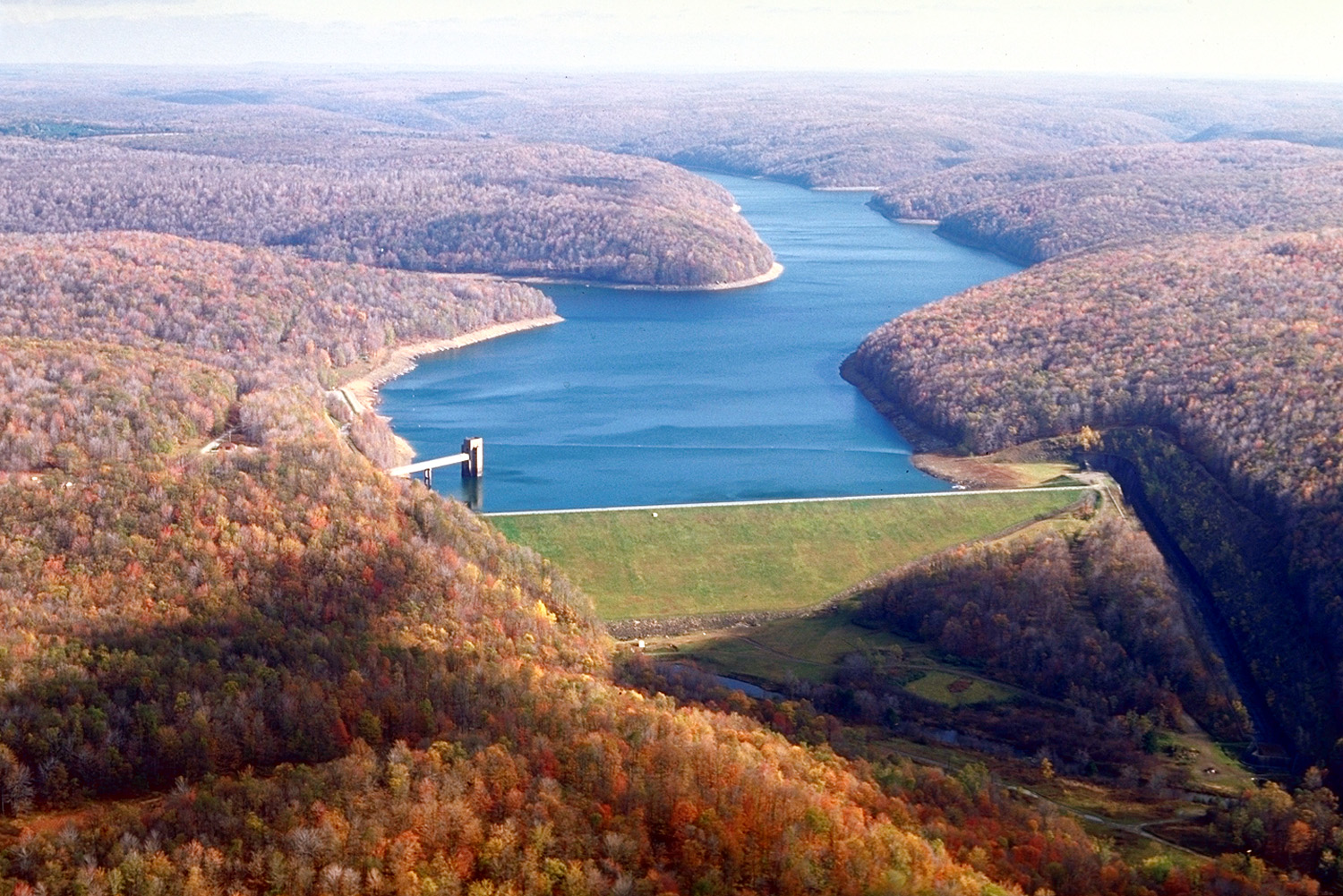
- East Branch Clarion River Lake and Dam

- Location within Pennsylvania Location within the United States
- Location: Elk County, Pennsylvania, United States
- Coordinates: 41°35′22″N 78°33′41″W
- Type: Reservoir
- Primary inflows: East Branch Clarion River
- Primary outflows: East Branch Clarion River
- Basin countries: United States
- Max. length: 5.7 m (19 ft)
- Surface area: 1,160 acres (470 ha)
- Surface elevation: 1,670 ft (510 m)

East Branch Clarion River Lake, or East Branch Lake is a reservoir at Elk State Park in Elk County, Pennsylvania, in the United States. It was constructed by the U.S. Army Corps of Engineers by damming the East Branch of the Clarion River. Construction of the rolled earth, impervious core dam was authorized by the Flood Control Act of 1944. The lake is one of sixteen flood control projects administered by the Pittsburgh District of the Army Corps of Engineers. East Branch Clarion River Lake helps to provide flood protection for the Clarion River valley and the lower portions of the Allegheny River and the upper portions of the Ohio River.

The dam is 7.3 mi (11.7 km) upstream from the confluence of the East and West branches of the Clarion River. It was constructed in 1952 for $9 million and serves a 72.4 mi^{2} (187 km^{2}) drainage area. It is estimated that East Branch Clarion River Lake has prevented $81 million in damage. The dam was especially important in curtailing damage during the 1972 floods caused by Hurricane Agnes.

East Branch Clarion River Lake also serves recreational purposes. Controlled releases of water during the dry summer months help to improve water quality and quantity for industrial and domestic uses. These releases of the lake waters also improve navigation on the rivers and enhance aquatic life.

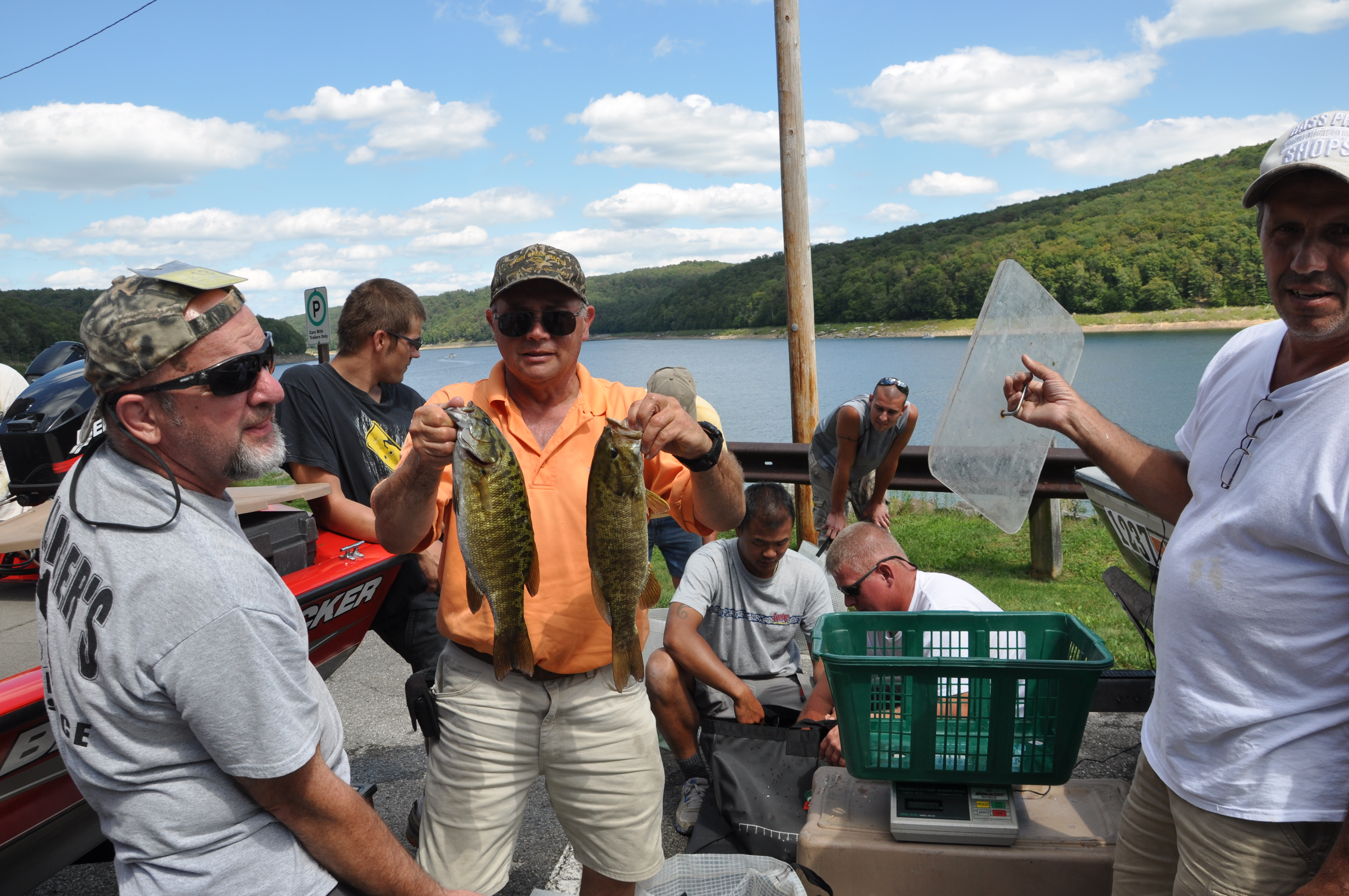
An August 2013 bass catch and release tournament held at the East Branch Clarion River Lake by the Reynoldsville Bass Club

East Branch Clarion River Lake is a destination for both fisherman and recreational boaters. The lake is home to cold water fishing for walleye, smallmouth bass, muskellunge, brook, lake, rainbow and brown trout. The creeks of the park are stocked by the Pennsylvania Fish and Boat Commission. There is a native brook trout population in some of the smaller streams of the park. There is no limit on the horsepower of the boats. All boats are required to have current registration with any state. Ice fishing and ice boating are common winter activities on East Branch Clarion River Lake.

The land in the vicinity of the dam is managed by the U.S. Army Corps of Engineers. The remainder of the land surrounding the lake is administered by the Pennsylvania Department of Conservation and Natural Resources as Elk State Park.
