= Elk State Park =

State park in Pennsylvania, United States

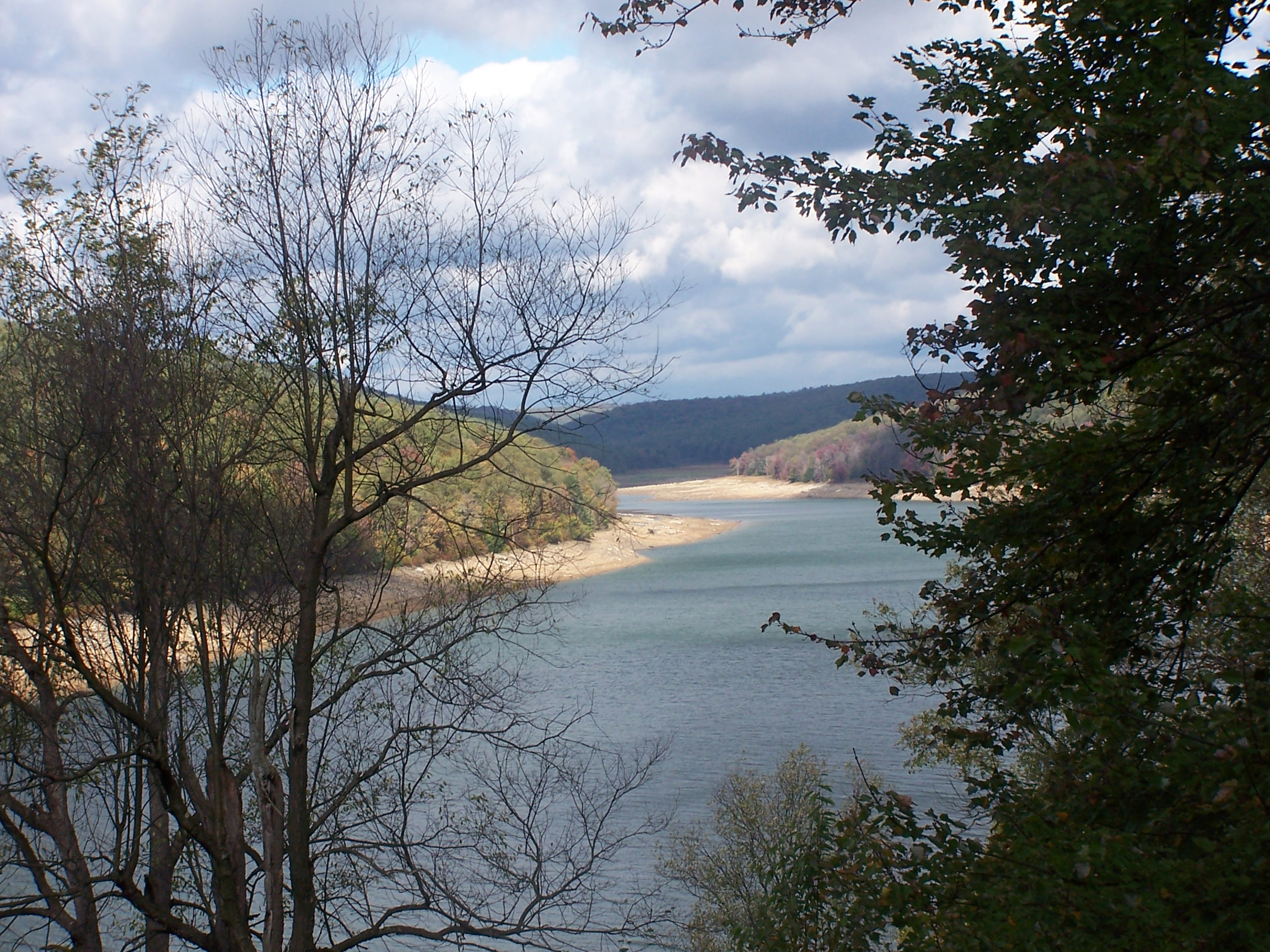
- The East Branch Clarion River Lake at Elk State Park

- Location within Pennsylvania Location within the United States
- Interactive map of Elk State Park
- Location: Elk and McKean counties, Pennsylvania, United States
- Coordinates: 41°36′22″N 78°33′36″W
- Area: 3,192 acres (1,292 ha)
- Elevation: 1,778 feet (542 m)
- Established: 1963
- Administrator: Pennsylvania Department of Conservation and Natural Resources
- Website: Official website
- Pennsylvania State Parks

Elk State Park is a 3,192-acre (1,292 ha) Pennsylvania state park in Jones Township, Elk County and Sergeant Township, McKean County, Pennsylvania, in the United States. East Branch Clarion River Lake is a man-made lake covering 1,160 acres (470 ha) within the park. The lake and streams in the park are stocked with cold and warm water fish. There are 3,151 acres (1,275 ha) of woods open to hunting.

== Recreation ==
=== East Branch Clarion River Lake ===
East Branch Clarion River Lake was constructed by the U.S. Army Corps of Engineers by damming the East Branch of the Clarion River. Construction of the rolled earth, impervious core dam was authorized by the Flood Control Act of 1944. The lake is one of sixteen flood control projects administered by the Pittsburgh District of the Army Corps of Engineers. East Branch Clarion River Lake helps to provide flood protection for the Clarion River valley and the lower portions of the Allegheny River and the upper portions of the Ohio River.

The dam is 7.3 miles (11.7 km) upstream from the confluence of the East and West branches of the Clarion River. It was constructed in 1952 for $9 million and serves a 72.4 square miles (188 km^{2}) drainage area. It is estimated that East Branch Clarion River Lake has prevented $81 million in damage. The dam was especially important in curtailing damage during the 1972 floods caused by Hurricane Agnes.

East Branch Clarion River Lake also serves recreational purposes. Controlled releases of water during the dry summer months help to improve water quality and quantity for industrial and domestic uses. These releases of the lake waters also improve navigation on the rivers and enhance aquatic life.

East Branch Clarion River Lake is a destination for both fisherman and recreational boaters. The lake is home to cold water fishing for walleye, smallmouth bass, muskellunge, brook, lake, rainbow and brown trout. The creeks of the park are stocked by the Pennsylvania Fish and Boat Commission. There is a native brook trout population in some of the smaller streams of the park. There is no limit on the power of the boats. All boats are required to have current registration with any state. Ice fishing and ice boating are common winter activities on East Branch Clarion River Lake.

=== Hunting ===
There are 3,151 acres (1,275 ha) of woods open to hunting. Hunters are expected to follow the rules and regulations of the Pennsylvania Game Commission. The common game species are black bears, squirrels, white-tailed deer, and turkeys. The hunting of groundhogs is prohibited. Hunters also use the park to gain access to the nearby State Game Lands and Elk State Forest.
