= Pennsylvania Route 646 =

State highway in McKean County, Pennsylvania, US

Pennsylvania Route 646

Route information
- Maintained by PennDOT
- Length: 19.153 mi (30.824 km)
- Existed: 1928–present

Major junctions
- South end: PA 59 in Keating Township
- PA 770 in Keating Township; PA 46 in Foster Township; PA 246 in Otto Township; PA 346 in Foster Township
- North end: NY 16 at the New York state line in Foster Township

Location
- Country: United States
- State: Pennsylvania
- Counties: McKean

Highway system
- Pennsylvania State Route System; Interstate; US; State; Scenic; Legislative
← PA 645	→ PA 647
← PA 743	→ PA 747

Pennsylvania Route 646 (PA 646) is a 19.15 miles (30.82 km) long state highway located in McKean County in Pennsylvania. The southern terminus is at PA 59 in Keating Township. The northern terminus is the New York state line in Foster Township. The route continues as New York State Route 16 (NY 16) in Cattaugarus County.

PA 646 was assigned in the 1928 mass numbering of state routes in Pennsylvania. At that time, it consisted entirely of the PA 346–state line stretch in Foster Township. The rest of the stretch consisted of PA 59, now realigned, and PA 746, now decommissioned. PA 746 was decommissioned in 1946, and PA 59 was realigned in 1952, with PA 646 being extended onto its current alignment. The route has remained virtually unchanged since the change in 1952.

== Route description ==
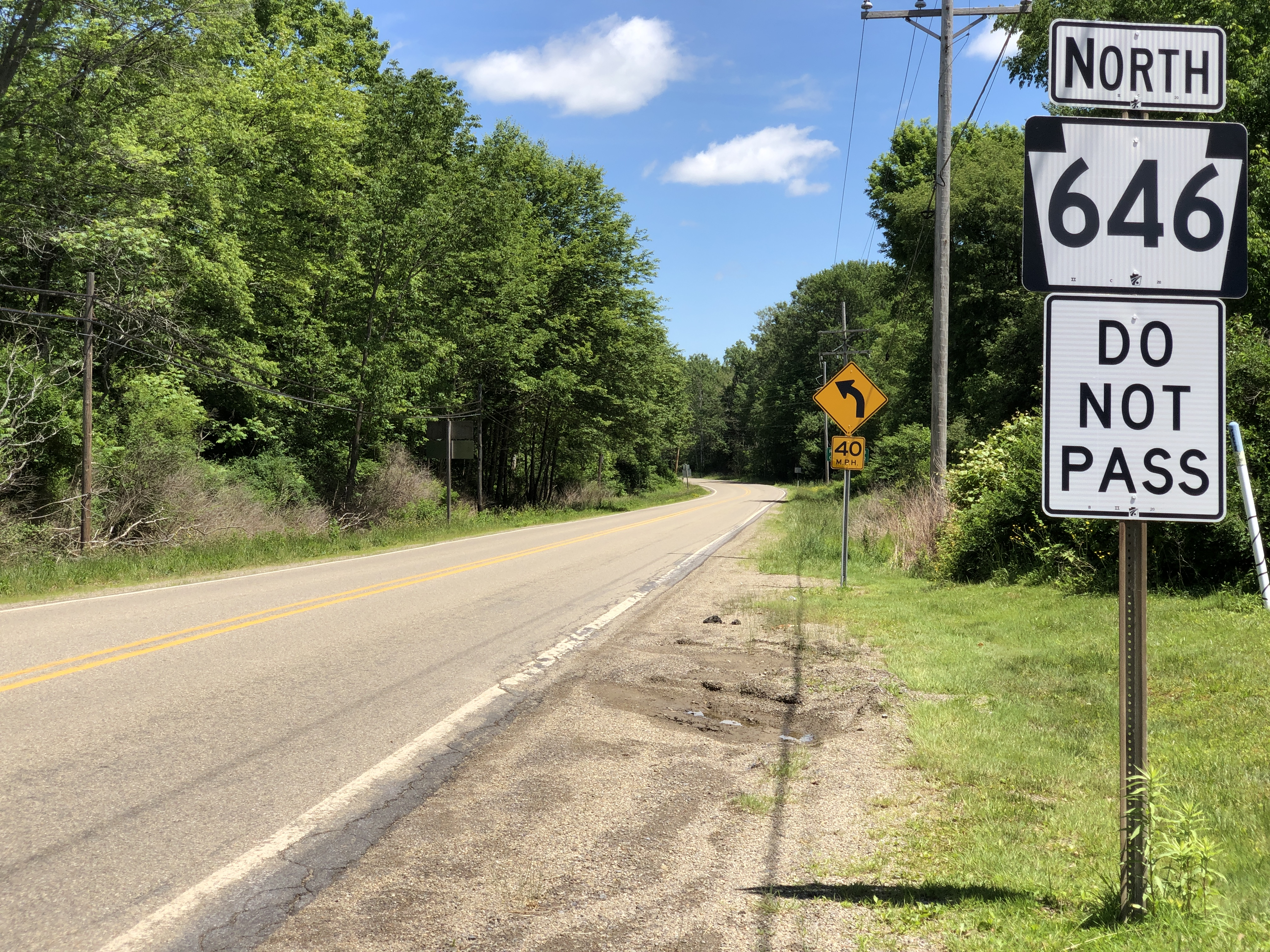
PA 646 northbound at PA 770 in Keating Township

=== Ormsby to Rew ===
PA 646 begins at an intersection with PA 59 in the small community of Ormsby. The highway, situated around several oil wells, progresses to the northwest through a moderately populated region of residential homes. PA 646 continues on this progression for several miles, parallelling a pipeline running through the Kinzua Valley. After an intersection with a local dirt road, the highway leaves Ormsby and continues into the under-populated forests in Keating Township. The route follows an old railroad grade, entering the small unincorporated place of McKean. When PA 646 turns to the north at a gradual bend, it crosses a second pipeline and enters the community of Cyclone.

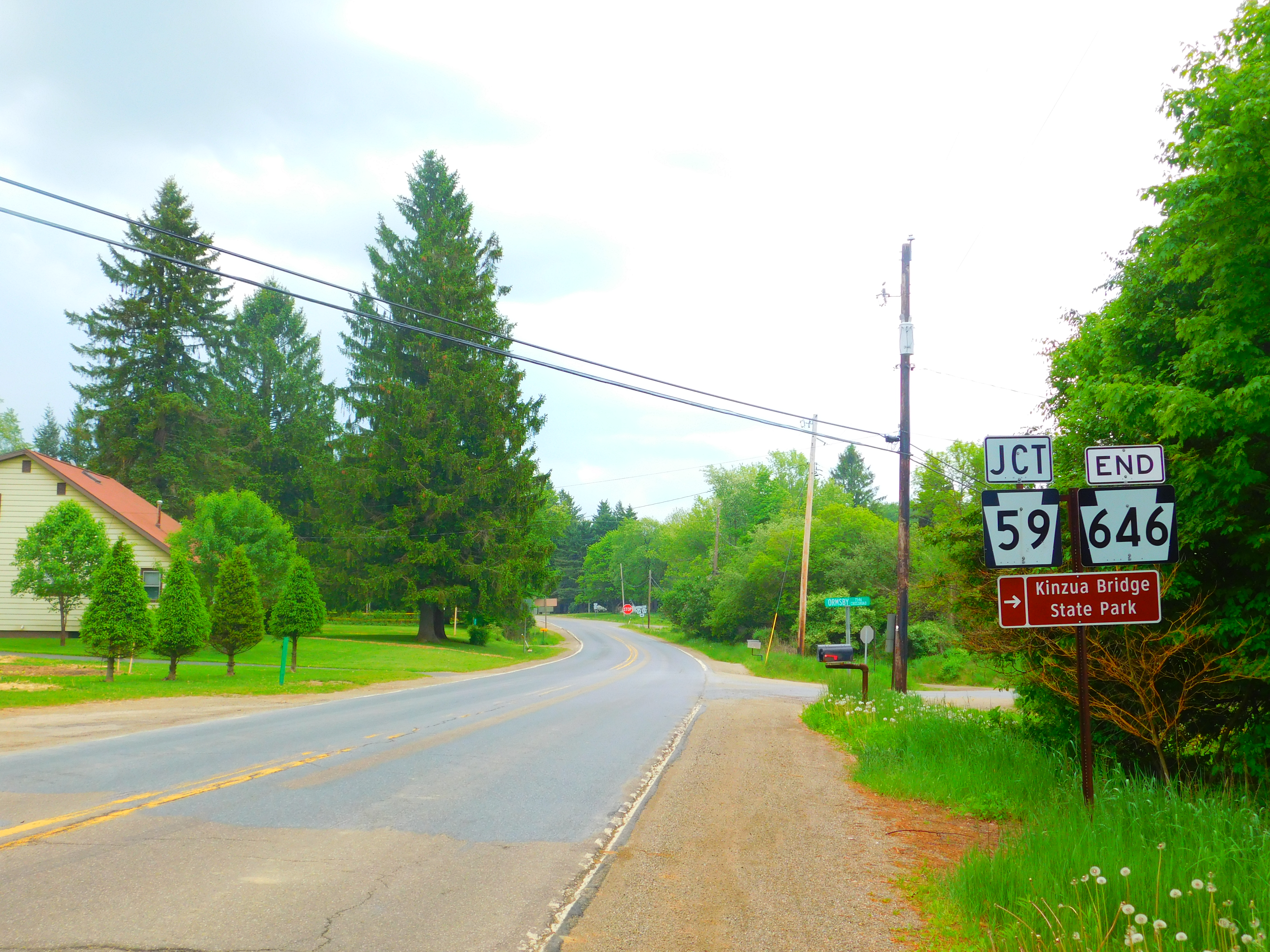
PA 646 at PA 59 in Ormsby

Upon entering Cyclone, PA 646 intersects with Pithole Road, which heads to the northeast and into McQuen Hollow, a local mountain range. The route itself heads to the northwest still, passing several residential homes in the area. After an intersection with Boyland Road, the highway turns to the north and leaves Cyclone for the woodlands in Keating Township once again. After leaving Cyclone, PA 646 enters the Bradford Oil Field, which includes the community of Cyclone and runs about two miles east of the Lafayette Township line. The route continues northbound for a couple miles, entering the community of Gifford, situated near the Lafayette Township line. The community is moderately developed, with most of the region contained by residential homes and local dirt roads. The major intersection in Gifford along PA 646 is the one with Alley Gifford and Droney Road. At a fork in the highway with Fairground Road, the highway turns northeastward, looping around on a gradual bend of the Bradford Oil Field.

A short distance after the bend, PA 646 continues to the northeast, entering the community of Aiken, where at another fork in the road, PA 770 begins. PA 646 continues to the northeast through Aiken, an under-developed community of residential homes. A short distance later, the highway crosses the township line into Bradford Township. The route continues for several miles, making a gradual bend in the woodlands into Foster Township. PA 646 continues, making an intersection with Wolf Run Road, which heads southward to the community of Middletown. At that intersection, PA 646 turns northeastward, entering the community of Rew. In Rew, the route becomes moderately developed once again, where it intersects with PA 46. After intersecting with Rew–Bradford Road, a highway that becomes a dirt road up Pratt Hollow, PA 646 progresses to the north and exits Rew.

=== Rew to Bells Camp ===
PA 646, after crossing out of Rew, enters the dense woodlands once again, where yet another pipeline is crossed. When the highway reaches this pipeline, the alignment of the highway turns, winding along Summit Road along the base of Pratt Hollow. The highway continues northward, winding around several mountains through the Bradford Oil Field, passing a large swamp before entering the small community of Summit. In Summit, PA 646 is partially developed, with most of the population situated at the intersection of PA 646 with PA 246. The route intersects with a Schimp Lane, a local road, before turning to the north and out of Summit. The route heads northward for a short distance, paralleling a grade right-of-way road, which heads eastward to Walkertown. A short distance later, PA 646 enters a small developed area, where the route intersects with PA 346.

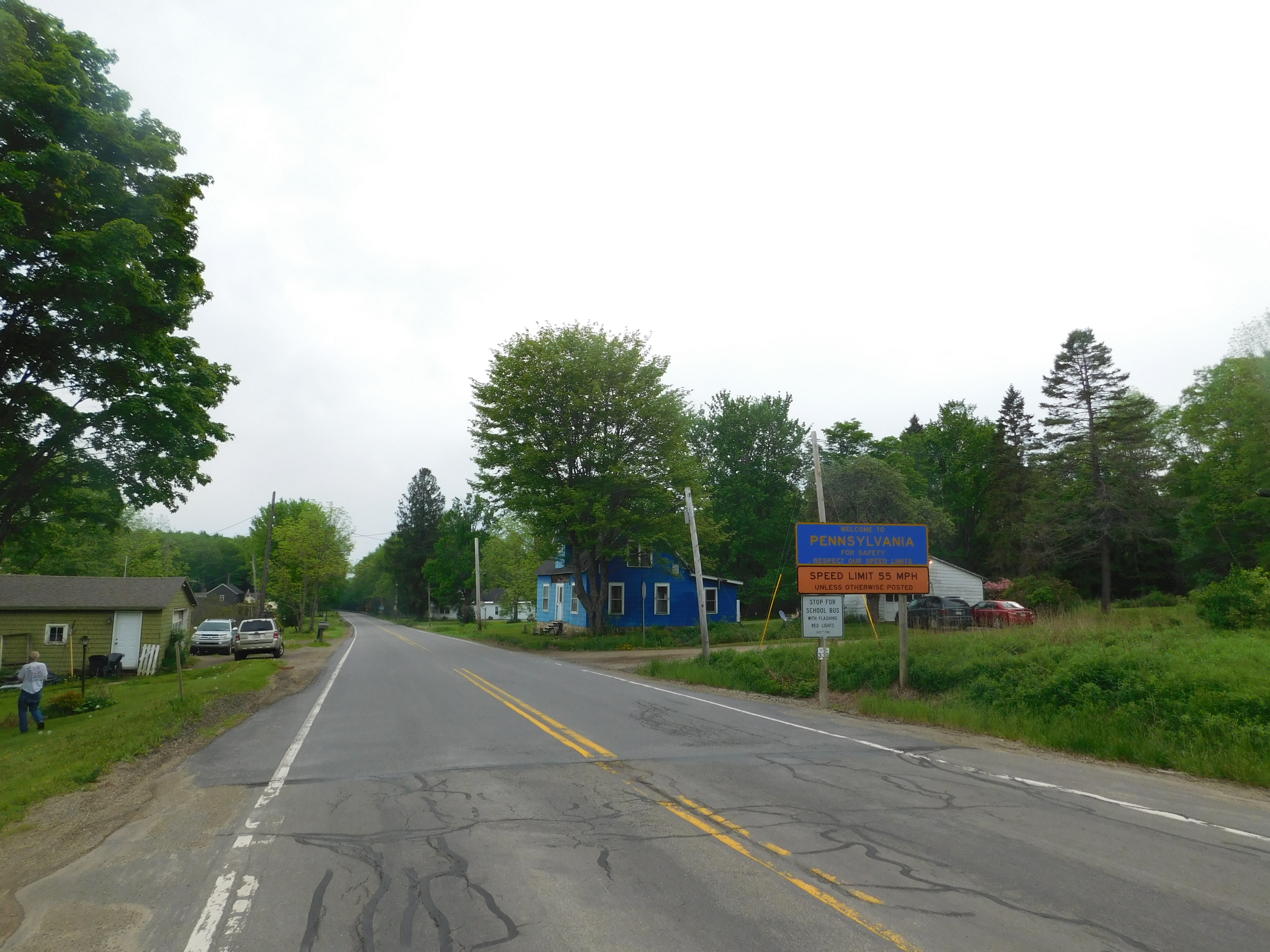
PA 646 from NY 16 in Foster Township at the state line

At the intersection with PA 346, PA 646 turns off its right-of-way, which continues along a pipeline as a dirt road, and onto a concurrency with the aforementioned touring route. PA 646 and PA 346 head eastward, intersecting with several dirt roads in a light woodland. The two highways continue eastward, entering the community of Red Rock. In Red Rock, most of the highway is unpopulated, until an intersection with Narrow Gauge Road, where most of the residential homes stand. When Narrow Gauge Road intersects with the two highways once again, PA 646 and PA 346 enter the community of Derrick City. In Derrick City, the highways pass along a stretch of residential houses before PA 646 turns off to the north on Olean Road. PA 346 continues ahead along Derrick Road towards Bradford.

After turning on Olean Road, PA 646 turns to the northeast, running along the Pennbrook Run for the entire stretch of highway. Along the highway several residential homes surround, while the road enters the community of Bells Camp. Bells Camp is moderately developed, and is the last designated community along PA 646. The highway forks off from Bells Camp Road, continuing further to the northeast along Olean Road. When the route turns to the east, PA 646 intersects with a connector street back to Bells Camp Road, which parallels to the north. The highway is undeveloped from this point, intersecting with Fullerton Road, which terminates at Olean Road. The route continues northward, paralleling PA 546 and Knapp Creek, before crossing the state line into New York a distance northwest of Fullerton. The right-of-way continues northward as NY 16 towards Olean.

== History ==
=== Designation ===
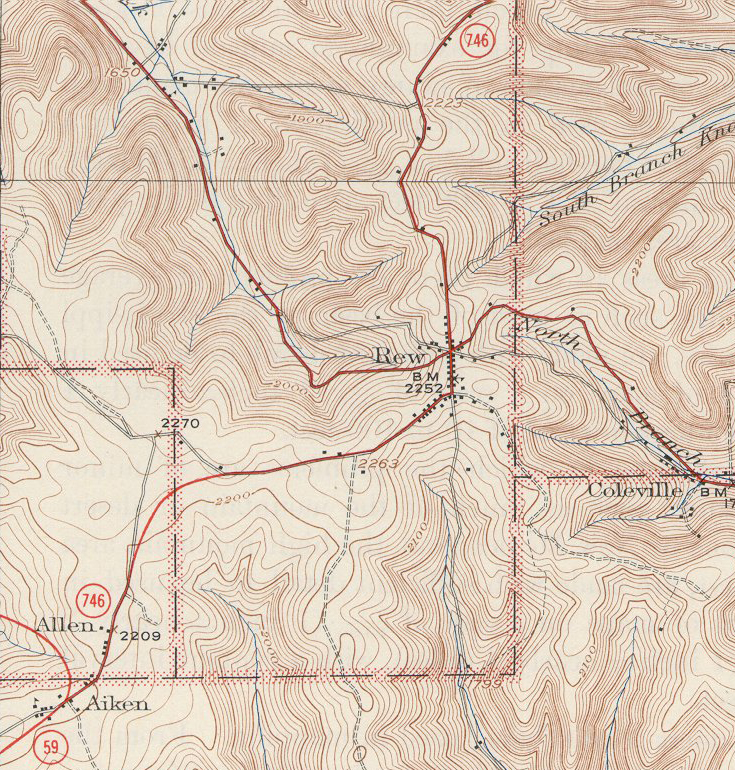
Southern terminus of PA 746 at Aiken

When the mass amount of state legislative routes were assigned in Pennsylvania in 1928, PA 646 consisted of only the stretch from PA 346 in Derrick City to the New York state line. There was no concurrency with PA 346 at that time. The stretch from PA 59 to PA 346 was not state-maintained. The rest of the current PA 646 was an alignment of PA 59. The entire alignment of PA 646 was paved in 1930. Also that year, the stretch from PA 59 in Aiken to PA 46 in Rew was designated as PA 746, a spur off PA 46.

This set of highways remained intact for over a decade, until 1946, when PA 746 was decommissioned in favor of extending PA 646 over its alignment. Now PA 646 continued along a concurrency with PA 346 and east of Red Rock, it went southward (away from PA 346) down to PA 59 in Aiken, where it ended. In 1952, PA 59 was realigned off its Ormbsy–Aiken alignment, and PA 646 was extended to Ormsby, where it ended at PA 59.

=== Historic bridges ===
There were three bridges constructed along PA 646 in 1930, when the alignment was designated as PA 59. The three bridges are in Gilmore, and all cross Pennbrook Run. The first one is 32.15 feet (9.80 m) long, and is a concrete tee beam bridge that handles an average of 957 people daily (2004). The bridge is structurally deficient and the cost to replace the bridge would amount to $591,000. The second bridge in Gilmore itself is a 40.20 feet (12.25 m) long concrete slab bridge across Pennbrook Run. This bridge is structurally deficient and would cost $656,000 to replace it completely.

The final bridge along PA 646 was constructed 1 mile (1.6 km) north of Gilmore over Pennbrook Run. Like the first bridge, it is a tee beam construction with a length of 32.15 feet (9.80 m). Like the previous two bridges, this one is also structurally deficient in its structure, having not been replaced since construction in 1930. To replace the bridge, it would cost $408,000.

== Major intersections ==
The entire route is in McKean County.

Location	mi	km	Destinations	Notes
Keating Township	0.000	0.000	PA 59 (Mount Alton Ormsby Road/Smethport Ormsby Road)	Southern terminus
Keating Township	6.412	10.319	PA 770 west (Minard Run Road)	Eastern terminus of PA 770
Foster Township	9.450	15.208	PA 46 (Rew Hill)	
Foster Township	12.647	20.353	PA 246 (Looker Mountain Trail)	
Foster Township	13.871	22.323	PA 346 east (Main Street)	Southern terminus of concurrency
Foster Township	15.826	25.469	PA 346 west (Derrick Road)	Northern terminus of concurrency
Foster Township	19.153	30.824	NY 16 north – Olean	New York state line; northern terminus
1.000 mi = 1.609 km; 1.000 km = 0.621 mi: Concurrency terminus
