= U.S. Route 219 in Pennsylvania =

Section of U.S. Route in Pennsylvania

U.S. Route 219
- US 219 highlighted in red

Route information
- Auxiliary route of US 19
- Maintained by PennDOT
- Length: 201 mi (323 km)

Major junctions
- South end: US 219 near Salisbury
- US 30 near Jennerstown; PA 56 in Johnstown; US 22 near Ebensburg; US 422 near Ebensburg; US 322 near DuBois; US 119 near DuBois; I-80 in Falls Creek; PA 28 in Brockway; US 6 near Mount Jewett
- North end: US 219 near Foster Brook

Location
- Country: United States
- State: Pennsylvania
- Counties: Somerset, Cambria, Indiana, Clearfield, Jefferson, Elk, McKean

Highway system
- United States Numbered Highway System; List; Special; Divided; Pennsylvania State Route System; Interstate; US; State; Scenic; Legislative
← PA 218	→ US 220
← US 6	→ US 6N

U.S. Route 219 (US 219) is a part of the U.S. Highway System that runs from Rich Creek, Virginia, to West Seneca, New York. From near Grantsville, Maryland north to Ebensburg, Pennsylvania, US 219 is Corridor N of the Appalachian Development Highway System. From Meyersdale, Pennsylvania to just south of Carrolltown, Pennsylvania, US 219 is a limited-access highway. From Carrolltown US 219 runs largely as a two-lane road to DuBois, Pennsylvania, through which it runs as Brady Street, and then returns to a two-lane road after a junction with Interstate 80. US 219 runs directly through the towns of Brockway, Ridgway, and Johnsonburg before reaching Wilcox, where PA Route 321 splits and heads for the town of Kane. US 219 continues north as a two-lane road until reaching Bradford, where it becomes a limited-access highway and remains so until reaching the New York border. On August 9, 2007, Pennsylvania State Transportation Secretary Allen D. Biehler unveiled four signs along US Route 219 that dedicated the portion of the route in Somerset County, Pennsylvania as the Flight 93 Memorial Highway.

== Route description ==
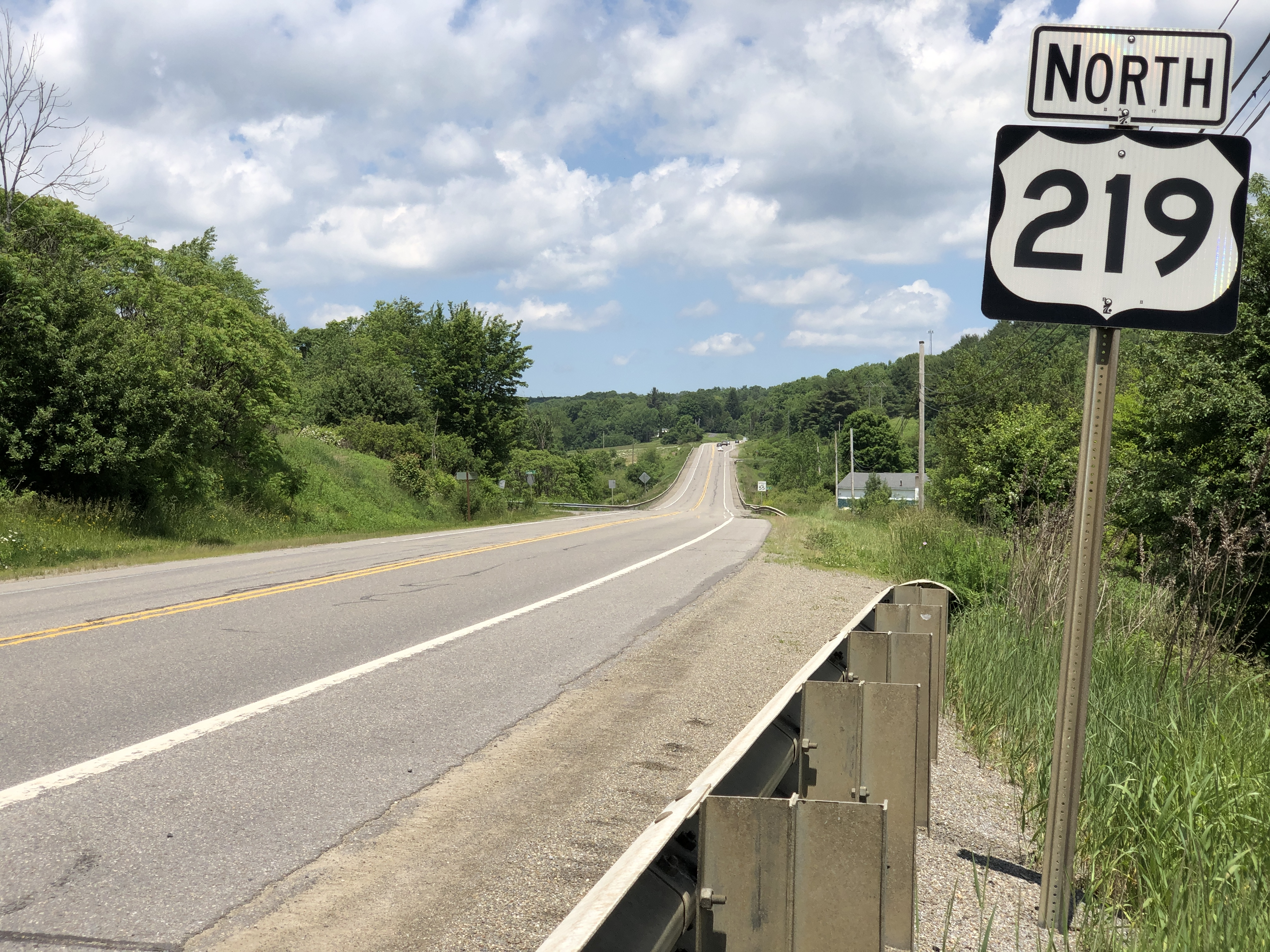
US 219 northbound in Horton Township

US 219 enters Pennsylvania from Maryland in Elk Lick Township, Somerset County, heading north as a two-lane undivided road through rural areas of farmland and woodland. The road intersects PA 669 in Salisbury before turning to the northeast. The route becomes a four-lane freeway and bypasses Meyersdale to the west, with US 219 Business serving the town. From here, US 219 continues north along the freeway toward Somerset. US 219 bypasses Somerset to the east and passes over the Pennsylvania Turnpike (I-70/I-76). The route interchanges with PA 281 before coming to a ramp with PA 601 that provides access to the Pennsylvania Turnpike. The road comes to the US 30 exit east of Jennerstown and heads through more areas of farms and woods, interchanging with PA 601 again followed by PA 403 northwest of Benson.

US 219 crosses the Stonycreek River into Cambria County and heads near suburban residential and commercial development southeast of Johnstown, coming to an interchange with PA 56. At this point, PA 56 forms a concurrency with US 219 and the road comes to an interchange with PA 756. PA 56 splits to the northwest onto a freeway at the next interchange and US 219 comes to an interchange with Galleria Drive, which provides access to The Johnstown Galleria shopping mall. The freeway heads into more rural areas of woods with some farms and reaches an interchange with PA 869 near the Johnstown Flood National Memorial. The next interchange along the US 219 freeway is with PA 53 in Summerhill. From this point, the road heads north through more rural areas, with a northbound exit and entrance at Tower Road. The route continues to the Ebensburg area, where it interchanges with US 22. From here, US 219 continues through wooded areas to the west of Ebensburg, coming to an interchange with the eastern terminus of the western segment of US 422. North of Ebensburg, the freeway segment of US 219 ends and the road heads north onto a two-lane undivided surface road, passing through more farmland and woodland. South of Carrolltown, the road intersects PA 553. After passing through Carrolltown, the route heads northwest, coming to an intersection with PA 271 in Northern Cambria. After this, US 219 begins to follow the West Branch Susquehanna River and curves to the north again, passing through forests and intersecting PA 240.

US 219 passes through Cherry Tree in Indiana County and intersects PA 580. US 219 continues into Clearfield County and passes through more forested areas, running through Burnside and coming to an intersection with PA 286. The road continues northeast alongside the West Branch Susquehanna River and comes to a junction with PA 36, heading east concurrent with that route. In Mahaffey, US 219 splits to the northeast and passes through more wooded areas while following the river, intersecting with PA 969 and splitting from the river. In Grampian, the route reaches an intersection with PA 729 and PA 879, where it turns to the northwest. US 219 curves to the north again and continues through more woodland with some farms, curving to the northwest. The route comes to an intersection with US 322 in Luthersburg and forms a concurrency with that route, coming to a junction with PA 410 a short distance later. South of DuBois, US 322 splits from US 219 by heading to the west and US 219 continues northwest to an intersection with the northern terminus of US 119, turning north at this point. The route heads into developed areas of homes and businesses in DuBois, widening into a five-lane road with a center left-turn lane as it approaches the intersection with PA 255. Here, US 219 turns west onto a three-lane road with a center left-turn lane and passes through more developed areas of the city. The road leaves DuBois and heads through more rural areas with some development, widening into a four-lane divided highway and intersecting PA 830 before coming to an interchange with I-80.

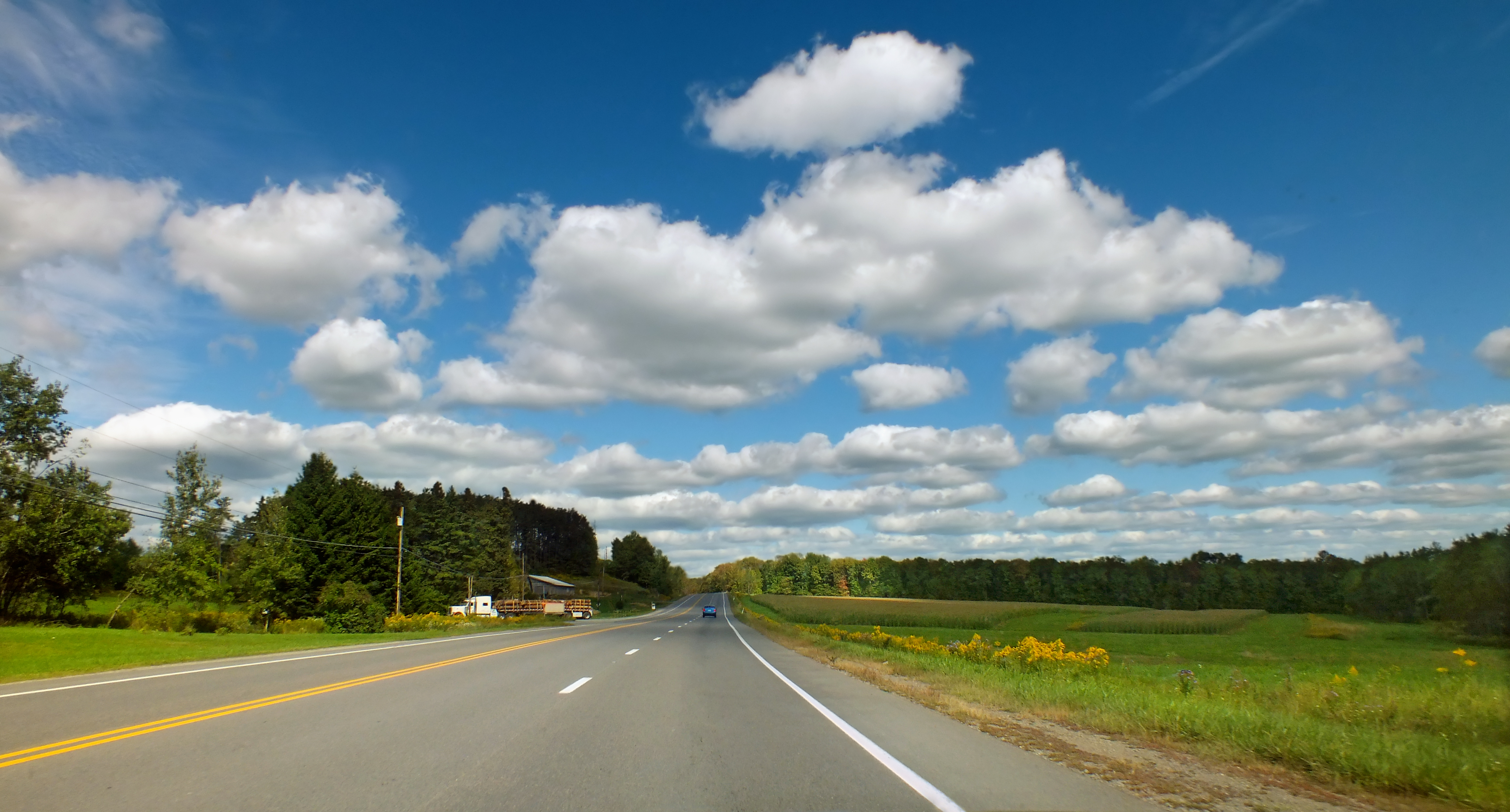
US 219 as seen in Horton Township in Elk County

US 219 heads north into Jefferson County and heads north through forests as a two-lane undivided road. The road heads into a mix of farmland and woodland, reaching Brockway. Here, the route intersects PA 28 and turns east, leaving the town and heading into more rural areas.

US 219 enters Elk County and continues northeast through more areas of woods and farms, intersecting PA 153. The road turns north and heads into more forested areas, coming to a junction with PA 948. At this point, PA 948 joins the route and the road heads northwest through more forests, descending a steep hill into Ridgway with US 219 Truck serving as a northbound truck bypass of the descent. In Ridgway, the road heads west and intersects PA 120 before US 219 splits from PA 948 by turning to the north. Past Ridgway, the route winds northeast through more forested areas alongside the Clarion River and reaches Johnsonburg, where it intersects PA 255 again. Past here, US 219 heads through more forested areas and comes to a junction with PA 321.

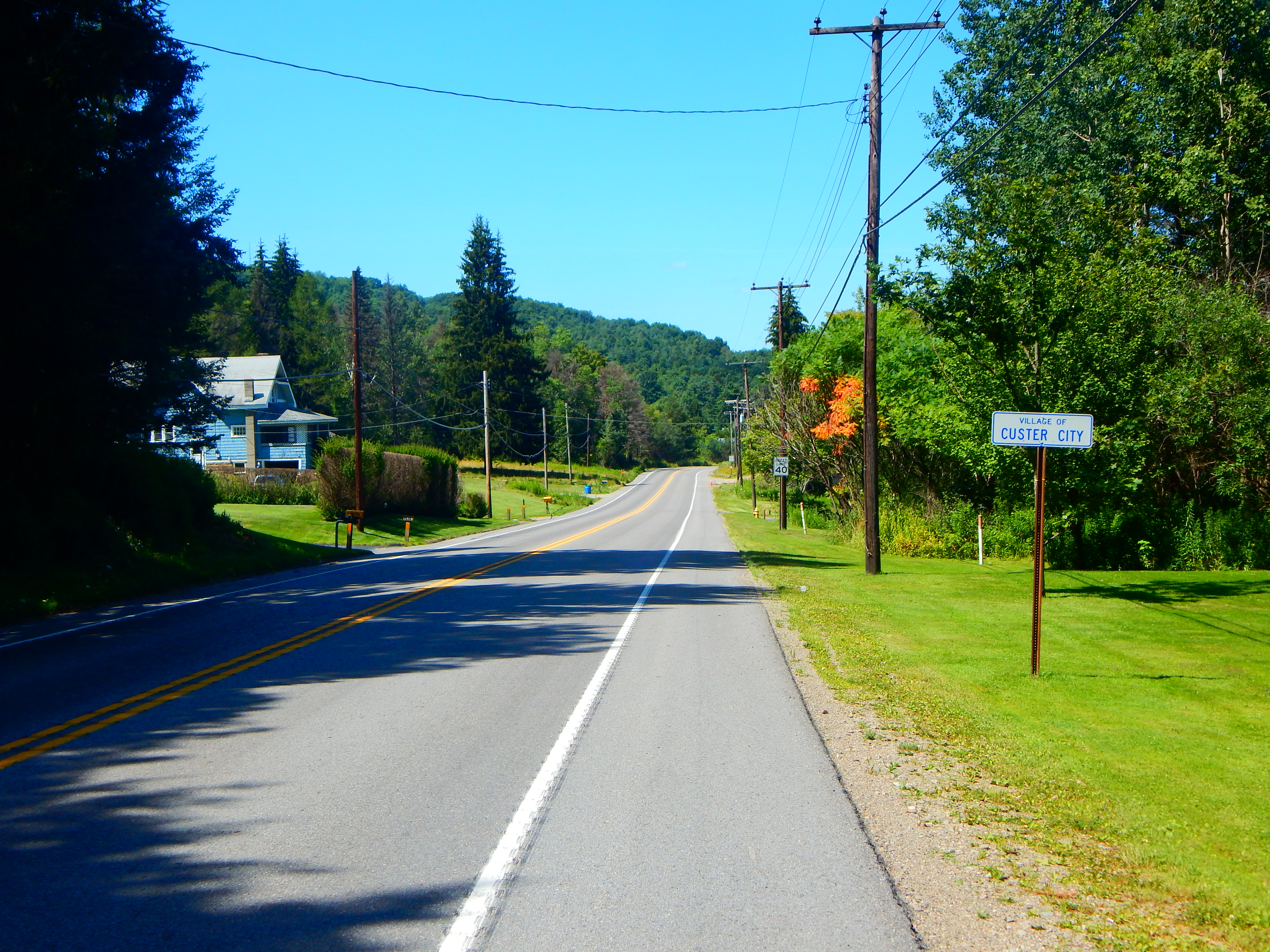
US 219 entering Custer City

US 219 continues into McKean County and runs through more dense forests, intersecting US 6 west of Mount Jewett. Past this, the road winds north through the Allegheny National Forest and reaches a junction with PA 59. US 219 heads northeast through more of the national forest before leaving it and passing through Lewis Run. From here, the road continues north through more rural areas, forming a short concurrency with PA 770. The route reaches the Bradford area, where it heads into developed areas of homes and businesses and becomes a four-lane divided freeway. The road reaches its first interchange with Owens Way to the south of Bradford. The freeway continues into Bradford, bypassing the center of town to the east and interchanging with PA 346, at which point that route joins the freeway. The road turns northeast and interchanges with PA 46 before PA 346 splits to the east at the next interchange. The US 219 freeway continues north through rural areas, with the freeway ending at the New York border. At this point, US 219 continues north into New York.

== History ==
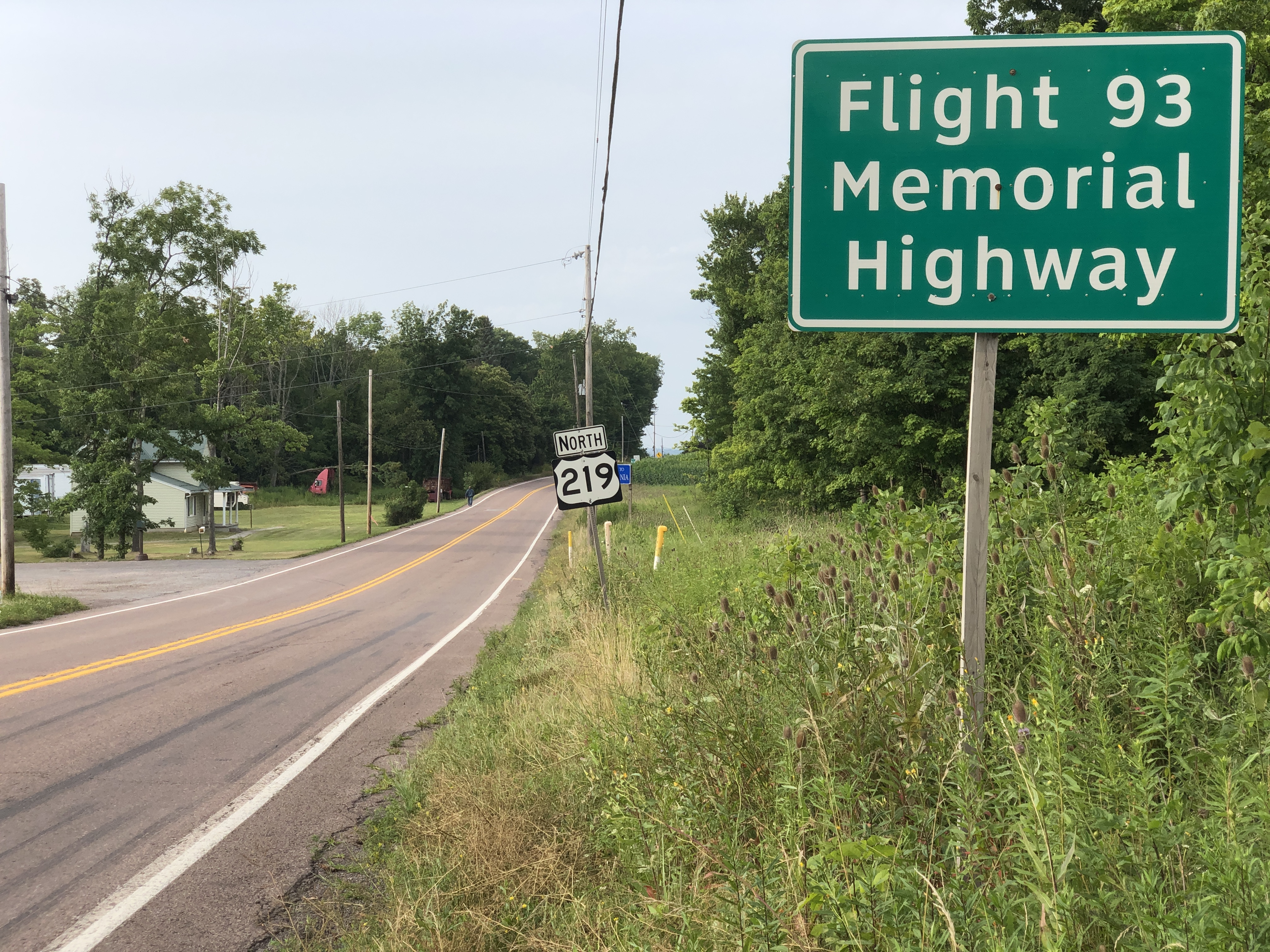
US 219 northbound past Maryland state line in Elk Lick Township, with sign dedicating route as the Flight 93 Memorial Highway

=== Potential Interstate designation ===
In the 1970s and 1980s, US 219 was upgraded to freeway status, with hopes that the highway eventually becomes part of the Interstate Highway System. Although the upgrades brought US 219 to contemporary Interstate Highway standards at the time, changes in engineering since would require US 219 to be further upgraded to modern Interstate standards. Until nearby Interstate 99 was signed in 1998 along the US 220 corridor, the nearest major north-south Interstate to US 219 was Interstate 79 82 miles (132 km) to the west, while Interstate 81 to the east was 163 miles (262 km) away.

In the 1990s and 2000s, U.S. Representative John Murtha advocated to Congress to get upgrades to US 219 to Interstate standards in order to receive an Interstate designation, with Murtha suggesting that US 219 receive the Interstate 67 designation. However, neighboring Representative Bud Shuster (and later his son Bill Shuster after the elder Shuster retired in 2001) argued against it due to the close proximity between US 219 and US 220, as well as wanting to secure funding for I-99. At the state level, there was a lack of interest to upgrade US 219 to Interstate status due to the Mon–Fayette Expressway to the west being under construction at the time, and the Pennsylvania Turnpike Commission fearing that an upgraded US 219 with Interstate status would divert toll revenues from the Mon–Fayette, even though the Mon–Fayette is being built to Interstate standards but isn't expected to receive an Interstate designation. By the time of Murtha's death in office in 2010, talks of upgrading US 219 to Interstate status had died off.

In 2013, with a larger allocation of Federal level funding, construction restarted on the US 219 Freeway starting between Meyersdale and Somerset. A $110.5 Million contract was awarded to the Joseph B. Fay Company by PennDOT. Construction on the new freeway section was completed in 2018, with the road opening on November 21. Between Meyersdale and Somerset, US 219 formerly followed a two-lane surface road. From Meyersdale, the road followed a winding path through rural areas, intersecting PA 653 in Garrett. The former portion of US 219 headed northeast from Garrett, turning to the northwest in Berlin. Southeast of Somerset, the old route heads north to the point at which it intersects the existing four-lane freeway.

If US 219 were to be upgraded to Interstate status, the designation would likely be a three-digit Interstate, as none of the two-digit designations available would fit into the proper Interstate grid, including I-67 and the aforementioned I-99. In addition, I-67 has since been proposed for a number of other north-south Interstate highways that would fit into the proper Interstate grid, and are more likely to receive upgrades to Interstate status than US 219.

== Major intersections ==
County	Location	mi	km	Destinations	Notes
Somerset	Elk Lick Township	0.0	0.0	US 219 south (Chestnut Ridge Road) – Grantsville	Maryland state line
Somerset	Salisbury	2.1	3.4	PA 669 south (Ord Street / SR 2010) – Springs, Pocahontas	Northern terminus of PA 669
Somerset	Summit Township			Southern end of freeway section	
Somerset	Summit Township			US 219 Bus. north – Meyersdale	Southern terminus of US 219 Bus.
Somerset	Summit Township			US 219 Bus. south – Meyersdale, Garrett	Northern terminus of US 219 Bus.; US 219 Bus./Meyersdale not signed northbound
Somerset	Black Township			Berlin, Rockwood	Access via East Mud Pike
Somerset	Somerset Township			Berlin, Somerset	Access via SR 3041
Somerset	Somerset Township	29.9	48.1	PA 281 – Somerset, Friedens	
Somerset	Somerset Township	32.1	51.7	To I-70 / I-76 / Penna Turnpike – Pittsburgh, Harrisburg	Access via PA 601
Somerset	Jenner Township	38.5	62.0	US 30 – Jennerstown, Stoystown	
Somerset	Conemaugh Township	43.7	70.3	PA 601 – Jerome	
Somerset	Conemaugh Township	46.0	74.0	PA 403 – Davidsville, Hollsopple	
Cambria	Richland Township	51.7	83.2	PA 56 east (Scalp Avenue) – Windber	Southern terminus of PA 56 concurrency
Cambria	Richland Township	52.5	84.5	PA 756 – Geistown, Elton	
Cambria	Richland Township	53.5	86.1	PA 56 west (Johnstown Expressway)	Northern terminus of PA 56 concurrency
Cambria	Richland Township			Galleria Drive	
Cambria	Adams Township	58.6	94.3	PA 869 east – St. Michael, Sidman	Western terminus of PA 869
Cambria	Croyle Township	60.6	97.5	PA 53 north – South Fork, Portage	Southern terminus of PA 53
Cambria	Croyle Township			New Germany	Northbound exit and entrance
Cambria	Cambria Township	67.6	108.8	US 22 – Blairsville, Hollidaysburg	
Cambria	Cambria Township	69.6	112.0	US 422 west – Indiana, Ebensburg	Eastern terminus of western segment of US 422
Cambria	East Carroll Township			Plank Road (SR 4031)	Proposed interchange
Cambria	East Carroll Township			Northern end of freeway section	
Cambria	East Carroll Township	76.7	123.4	PA 553 west (Ridge Road) – Indiana	Eastern terminus of PA 553
Cambria	Carrolltown			Sunset Road (SR 4013)	Future US 219 Alt. north (approved by AASHTO in 2009)
Cambria	Northern Cambria	83.7	134.7	PA 271 south (24th Street) – Nanty Glo	Northern terminus of PA 271
Cambria	Susquehanna Township	89.2	143.6	PA 240 west (Peg Run Road) – Clymer	Eastern terminus of PA 240
Indiana	Cherry Tree	90.6	145.8	PA 580 south (Cherry Street)	Northern terminus of PA 580
Clearfield	Burnside Township	99.1	159.5	PA 286 west (Dowler Highway) – Indiana	Eastern terminus of PA 286
Clearfield	McGees Mills	103.5	166.6	PA 36 north (Colonel Drake Highway) – Punxsutawney	Southern terminus of PA 36 concurrency
Clearfield	Mahaffey	105.7	170.1	PA 36 south (Market Street) – Altoona, Prince Gallitzin State Park	Northern terminus of PA 36 concurrency; future US 219 Alt. south (approved by AASHTO in 2009)
Clearfield	Bells Landing	111.7	179.8	PA 969 east (Lumber City Highway) – Lumber City	Western terminus of PA 969
Clearfield	Grampian	116.2	187.0	PA 729 south (Main Street) / PA 879 east (1st Street) – Curwensville, Clearfield, Glen Hope	Northern terminus of PA 729; western terminus of PA 879
Clearfield	Luthersburg	125.8	202.5	US 322 east (Luthersburg-Rockton Road) – Rockton, Clearfield	Southern terminus of US 322 concurrency
Clearfield	Luthersburg	126.0	202.8	PA 410 west (Shamokin Trail) – Punxsutawney	Eastern terminus of PA 410
Clearfield	Sandy Township	128.8	207.3	US 322 west (Behringer Highway) – Brookville	Northern terminus of US 322 concurrency
Clearfield	Sandy Township	130.0	209.2	US 119 south (Blinker Parkway) – Punxsutawney	Northern terminus of US 119
Clearfield	DuBois	132.7	213.6	PA 255 north (East DuBois Avenue) to I-80 east – St. Marys	Southern terminus of PA 255
Clearfield	Sandy Township	134.5	216.5	PA 830 west (Slab Run Road) – Falls Creek	Eastern terminus of PA 830
Clearfield	Sandy Township	135.1	217.4	I-80 – Sharon, Bellefonte, DuBois Regional Airport	I-80 exit 97
Jefferson	Brockway	142.6	229.5	PA 28 south (Main Street) – Brookville	Northern terminus of PA 28
Elk	Horton Township	148.3	238.7	PA 153 south (Penfield Road) – Penfield, Clearfield	Northern terminus of PA 153
Elk	Boot Jack	156.2	251.4	PA 948 south (Kersey Road) – Kersey	Southern terminus of PA 948 concurrency
Elk	Ridgway Township	158.7	255.4	US 219 Truck north	Southern terminus of US 219 Truck; northbound exit only
Elk	Ridgway	159.9	257.3	PA 120 east (Depot Street) – St. Marys, Emporium	Western terminus of PA 120; northern terminus of US 219 Truck (northbound only)
Elk	Ridgway	160.1	257.7	PA 948 north (Main Street) – Corsica, Warren	Northern terminus of PA 948 concurrency
Elk	Johnsonburg	167.3	269.2	PA 255 south (Powers Avenue) – St. Marys	Northern terminus of PA 255
Elk	Jones Township	174.0	280.0	PA 321 north (Buena Vista Highway) – Kane	Southern terminus of PA 321
McKean	Lantz Corners	184.1	296.3	US 6 (Grand Army of the Republic Highway) – Kane, Mount Jewett, Smethport, Kinzua Bridge State Park	
McKean	Timbuck	192.2	309.3	PA 59 / PA 770 Truck west (Mt. Alton Road) – Warren, Smethport, Bradford Regional Airport, Federal Correctional Institution	Southern terminus of PA 770 Truck concurrency
McKean	Custer City	200.1	322.0	PA 770 west (West Warren Road) – Warren	Northern terminus of PA 770 Truck concurrency; southern terminus of PA 770 concurrency
McKean	Degolia	200.8	323.2	PA 770 east (Minard Run Road) – Smethport	Northern terminus of PA 770 concurrency
McKean	Bradford Township			Southern end of freeway section	
McKean	Bradford Township			Owens Way	
McKean	Bradford			To PA 346 west / Elm Street	Northbound exit and southbound entrance
McKean	Bradford	203.8	328.0	PA 346 west (Forman Street)	Southern terminus of PA 346 concurrency
McKean	Bradford	204.9	329.8	PA 46 south (Kendall Avenue)	Northern terminus of PA 46
McKean	Foster Township	205.6	330.9	PA 346 east – Foster Brook	Northern terminus of PA 346 concurrency
McKean	Foster Township	207.1	333.3	US 219 north – Salamanca	New York state line
1.000 mi = 1.609 km; 1.000 km = 0.621 mi: Concurrency terminus; Incomplete access

== See also ==
U.S. Route 219
Previous state: Maryland	Pennsylvania	Next state: New York
