= Pennsylvania Route 770 =

State highway in McKean County, Pennsylvania, US

Pennsylvania Route 770
- PA 770 in red, and PA 770 Truck in blue

Route information
- Maintained by PennDOT
- Length: 12.2 mi (19.6 km)
- Existed: December 1962–present

Major junctions
- West end: PA 59 in Lafayette Township
- US 219 in Bradford Township
- East end: PA 646 in Keating Township

Location
- Country: United States
- State: Pennsylvania
- Counties: McKean

Highway system
- Pennsylvania State Route System; Interstate; US; State; Scenic; Legislative
← PA 766	→ PA 772

Pennsylvania Route 770 (PA 770) is a 12-mile-long (19 km), east–west state highway that is located in McKean County in Pennsylvania.

The western terminus is situated at PA 59 in Lafayette Township. The eastern terminus is located at PA 646 in Keating Township.

== Route description ==
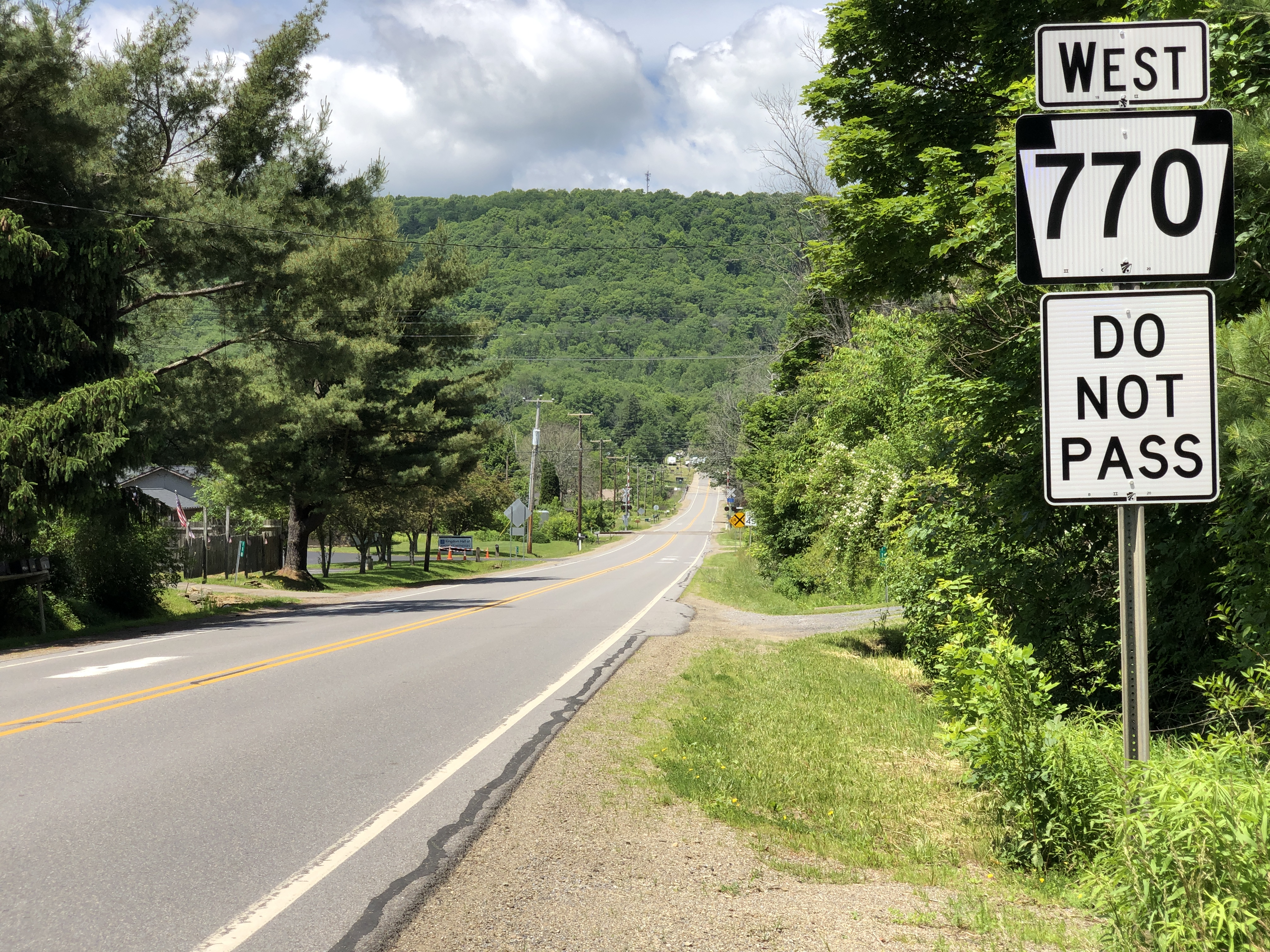
PA 770 westbound in Bradford Township

PA 770 begins in Lafayette Township at an intersection with PA 59. The route progresses east to the village of Custer City, where it has a short concurrency with US 219.

After the concurrency with US 219, the route continues southeast to its terminus at PA 646 in the village of Aiken. This route is known by three different names at various points: Warren Road, Buffalo–Pittsburgh Highway and Minard Run Road.

== History ==
The route was signed in December 1962 alongside the creation of PA 321, and has stayed on the same roads since its inception.

== Major intersections ==
The entire route is in McKean County.

Location	mi	km	Destinations	Notes
Lafayette Township	0.0	0.0	PA 59 – Warren, Smethport	Western terminus
Bradford Township	6.7	10.8	US 219 south – Ridgway	Western terminus of US 219 concurrency
Bradford Township	7.3	11.7	US 219 north – Bradford	Eastern terminus of US 219 concurrency
Keating Township	12.2	19.6	PA 646 – Smethport, Olean	Eastern terminus
1.000 mi = 1.609 km; 1.000 km = 0.621 mi: Concurrency terminus

== PA 770 Truck ==
Pennsylvania Route 770 Truck
- Location: Lafayette Township – Bradford Township
- Length: 13 mi (21 km)
- Existed: 1980–present

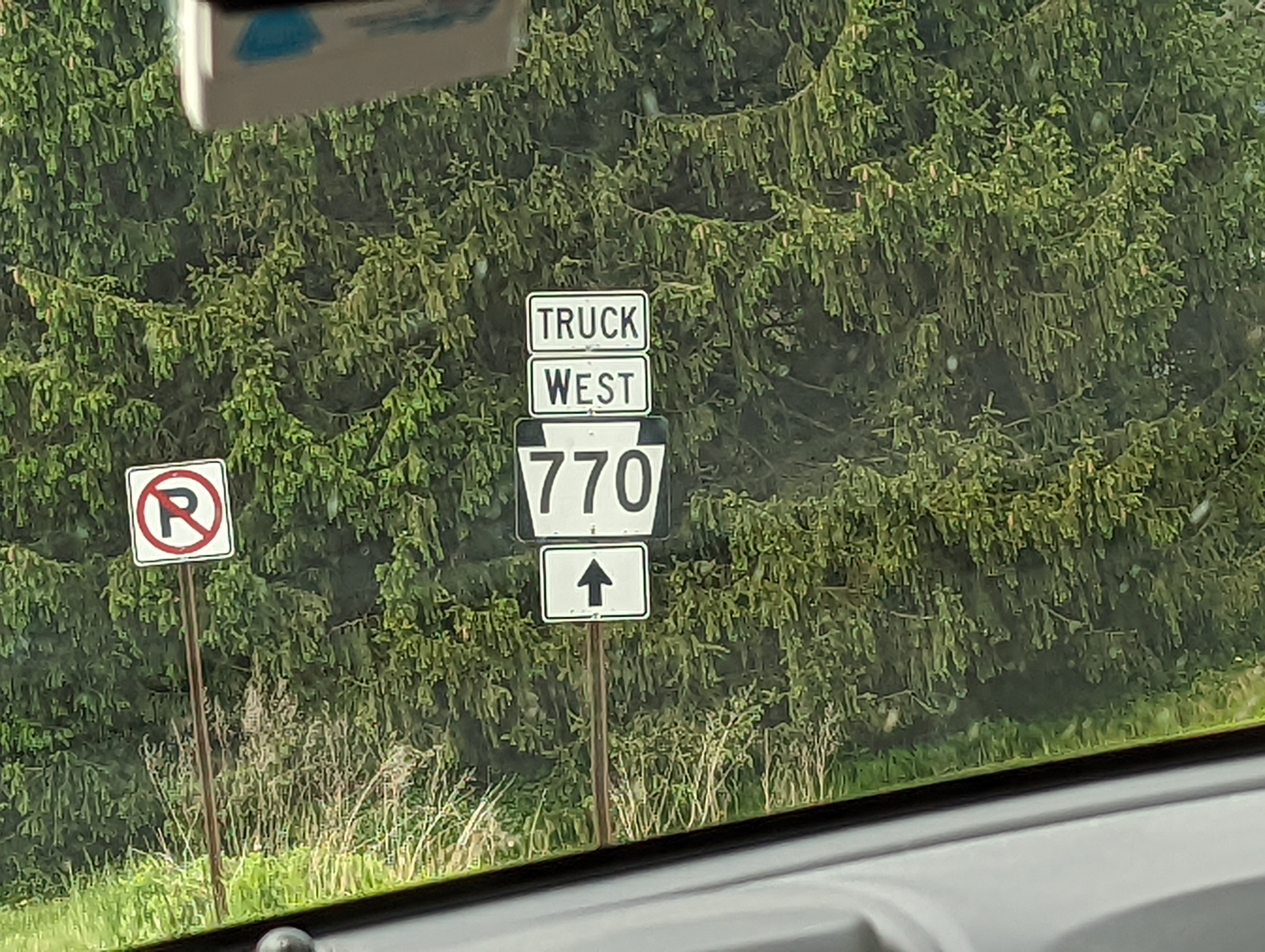
PA 770 Truck following PA 59 from its eastern terminus.

Pennsylvania Route 770 Truck is a 13-mile-long (21 km) truck route bypassing a segment of PA 770 where trucks over ten tons are prohibited in McKean County. It begins at the PA 770 terminus in Lafayette Township. It ends at PA 770 in Bradford Township.

The route is an oddity, as it is longer than its main route (PA 770) by one mile, and that its only signed as such westbound, instead of both directions. The entire route follows PA 59 on its western end, and US 219 on its eastern end.
