= Pennsylvania Route 346 =

State highway in Pennsylvania, US

Pennsylvania Route 346

Route information
- Maintained by PennDOT and City of Bradford
- Length: 34.177 mi (55.003 km)
- Existed: 1928–present

Major junctions
- West end: NY 280 at the New York state line in the Allegheny National Forest
- PA 321 in the Allegheny National Forest; US 219 in Bradford; PA 46 in Bradford
- East end: PA 446 in Eldred

Location
- Country: United States
- State: Pennsylvania
- Counties: Warren, McKean

Highway system
- Pennsylvania State Route System; Interstate; US; State; Scenic; Legislative
← PA 345	→ PA 347
← PA 158	→ PA 160

Pennsylvania Route 346 (PA 346) is a 34.177-mile (55.003 km) state highway located in Warren and McKean counties in Pennsylvania, United States The western terminus is at the New York state line in the Allegheny National Forest, where it becomes New York State Route 280 (NY 280). The eastern terminus is at an intersection with PA 446 in Eldred. The route is mostly a two-lane road that passes through rural areas in the northern part of McKean County. PA 346 passes through the city of Bradford, where it has a concurrency with the U.S. Route 219 (US 219) freeway.

PA 346 was designated in 1928 between Foster Brook and Eldred. The route was extended to PA 159 in Corydon in 1935 and south along the former PA 159 in 1946. PA 346 was rerouted to its current western terminus when the Allegheny Reservoir was created in the 1960s. The route was moved onto the US 219 freeway in Bradford in 1977.

== Route description ==
PA 346 begins at the Pennsylvania–New York state line in the Allegheny National Forest as a continuation of NY 280. The route runs southeast through the forest along Willow Bay of the Allegheny Reservoir. Soon the route runs east from Warren County to McKean County. Leaving Willow Bay, PA 346 turns southeast again through the National Forest. It passed Bradford Reservoir Marilla followed by the University of Pittsburgh at Bradford, both on the south side of the roadway. It then passes former St. Bernard Elementary and a cemetery before entering the city of Bradford just west of the Interstate Parkway. PA 321.

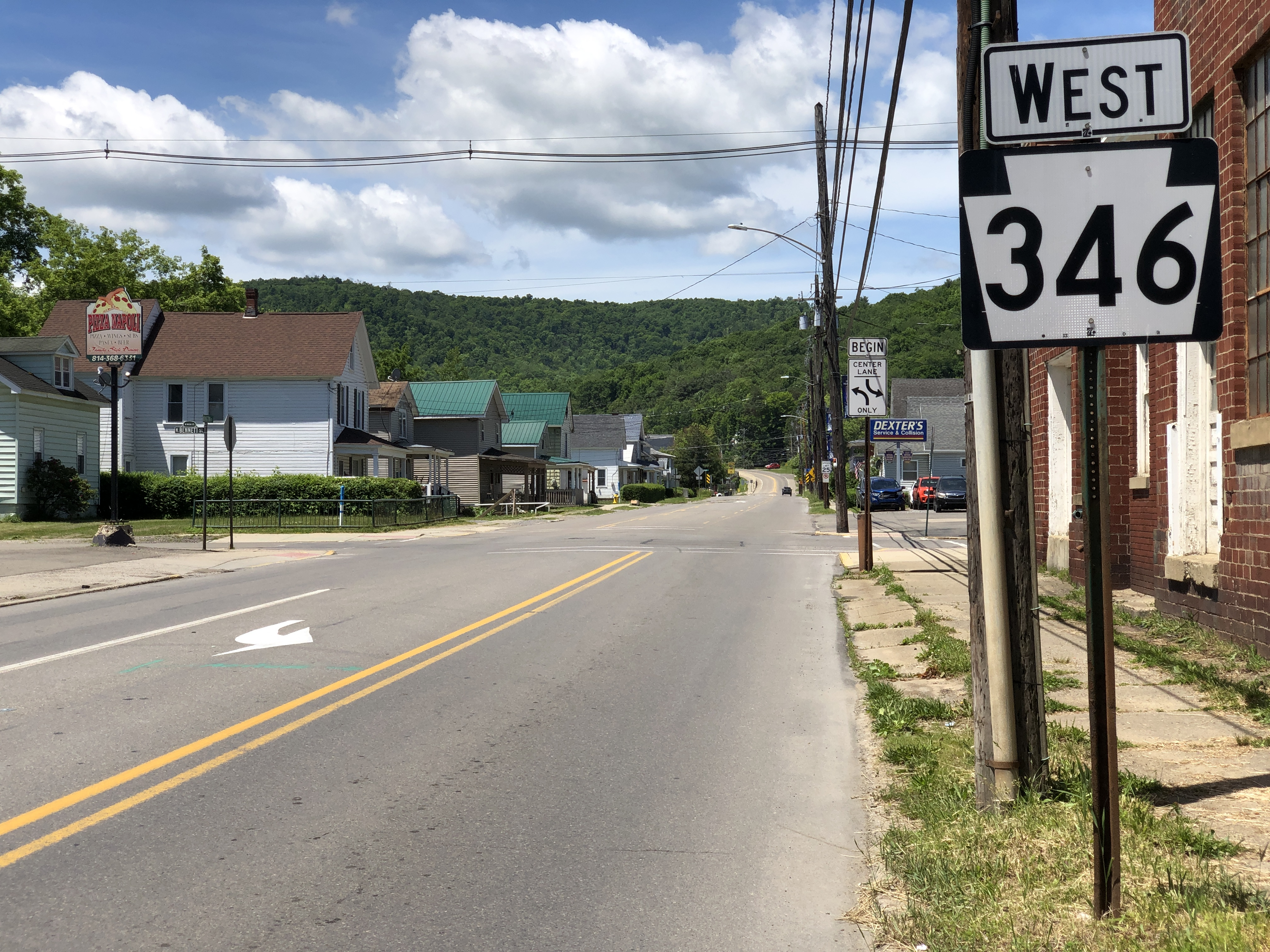
PA 346 westbound in Bradford near the junction with Interstate Parkway

After bending eastward again, PA 346 wanders east through the forest for several miles through The Willows and the route bends northwest and soon to the southeast. After numerous changes in direction, PA 346 reaches Hazelton Mills and leaves the dense forest for a suburb of Bradford. In Hazelton Mills, the route turns northeast and enters the city of Bradford as West Washington Street. A two-lane city street, PA 346 runs east and turns south at an intersection with Mechanic Street. PA 346 runs south on Mechanic Street for three blocks, turning east onto Main Street.

Running east along Main Street, PA 346 reaches the intersection with Davis Street, where it turns north on Davis. Two blocks north, the route turns east again, this time on Forman Street, and crosses the Buffalo and Pittsburgh Railroad's Bradford Industrial Track line. PA 346 reaches an interchange with US 219 and turns north to join the freeway. US 219 and PA 346 run northeast through Bradford, passing through the industrial sector of the city, where it heads over the Buffalo and Pittsburgh Railroad tracks. The highway comes to an interchange with PA 46 (North Kendall Street). The freeway continues northeast through Bradford until PA 346 turns off at an interchange with Bolivar Drive.

PA 346 now runs east along Bolivar Drive through East Bradford as a two-lane city street, crossing the Buffalo and Pittsburgh Railroad's B&P Main Line Subdivision line. After crossing East Main Street, the route leaves the city of Bradford and changes names to Derrick Road as it enters Foster Township. PA 346 wanders east and southeast through Foster Township, the route reaches the village of Derrick City, where it intersects with PA 646 (Olean Road). PA 346 and PA 646 become concurrent and wander southeast through rural Foster Township.

At the junction with Old Plank Road, PA 646 turns for the south while PA 346 continues east and northeast into Otto Township. After a bend to the southeast, the route reaches the village of Duke Center, where it reaches the southern terminus of PA 546. Running southeast from PA 546, PA 346 starts paralleling PA 246 before the two roads intersect in Otto Township. After PA 246, the route turns northeast once again and crosses into the borough of Eldred. In Eldred, PA 346 passes over the Allegheny River and the Buffalo Line railroad line, which is owned by Norfolk Southern and operated by the Western New York and Pennsylvania Railroad, before it ends at an intersection with PA 446.

== History ==
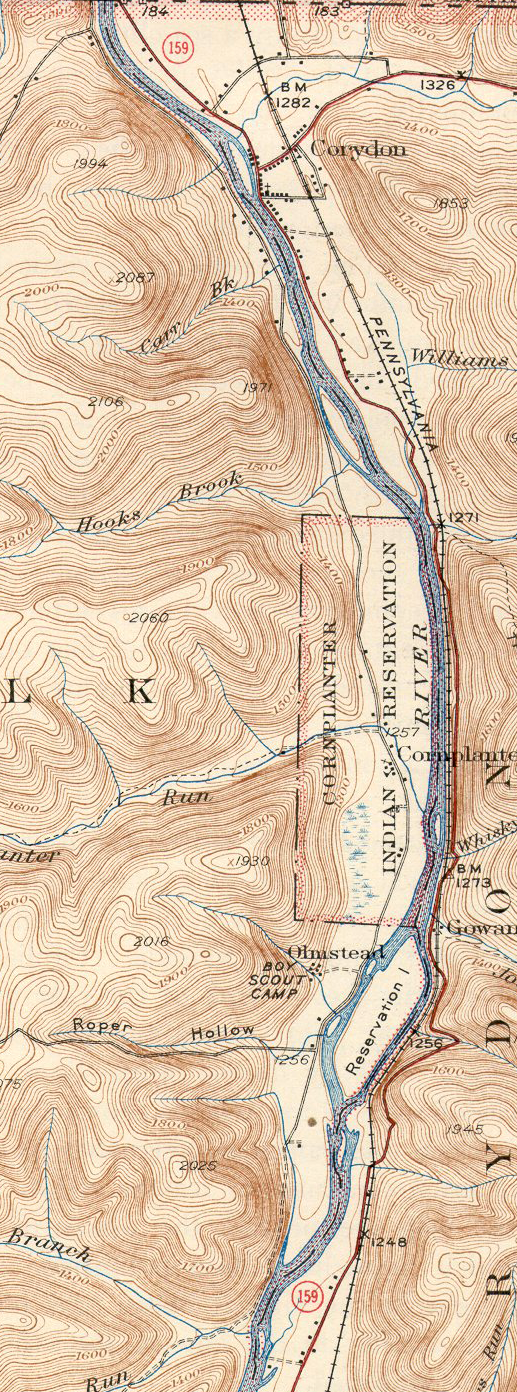
The routing of PA 159 along the Allegheny River in 1941

PA 346 was assigned in the original assignment of state highways in Pennsylvania in 1928. It originally began in Foster Brook, north of Bradford, and ended in Eldred. It was extended westward in 1935 to a new terminus at Corydon, where it ended at PA 159, a north–south route assigned in 1928 that began at PA 59 in Cornplanter and followed the Allegheny River north to the New York state line. This 10-mile (16 km) alignment of PA 159 remained in place until 1946, when all of PA 159 south of Corydon was replaced by an extended PA 346. The short segment of PA 159 between Corydon and the state line became unnumbered.

When the Allegheny Reservoir was completed in 1967, the portion of PA 346 near the Allegheny River was permanently inundated, with a new route, PA 321, constructed to replace it. As a result, PA 346 was rerouted slightly on its existing western end to head northwest to the state line, where it connected to the rebuilt NY 280. Originally, PA 346 followed East Main Street in Bradford and Foster Brook. When the Bradford Bypass (US 219) was finished in 1977, the Pennsylvania Department of Transportation realigned PA 346 onto the bypass as well.

== Major intersections ==
County	Location	mi	km	Destinations	Notes
Warren	Mead Township	0.000	0.000	NY 280 north	New York state line; western terminus of PA 346
McKean	Corydon Township	3.078	4.954	PA 321 south – Kane	Northern terminus of PA 321
McKean	Bradford	17.591	28.310	West end of freeway (on US 219)	
McKean	Bradford	17.591	28.310	US 219 south – Ridgway	West end of US 219 concurrency
McKean	Bradford	18.672	30.050	PA 46 south (Kendall Avenue)	Northern terminus of PA 46
McKean	Bradford	19.279	31.027	US 219 north – Salamanca	East end of US 219 concurrency
McKean	Bradford	19.279	31.027	East end of freeway (on US 219)	
McKean	Foster Township	22.434	36.104	PA 646 north (Olean Road) – Olean	West end of PA 646 concurrency
McKean	Foster Township	24.389	39.250	PA 646 south (Old Plank Road)	East end of PA 646 concurrency
McKean	Otto Township	27.738	44.640	PA 546 north	Southern terminus of PA 546
McKean	Otto Township	30.311	48.781	PA 246 west (Looker Mountain Trail) – Rixford	Eastern terminus of PA 246
McKean	Eldred	34.177	55.003	PA 446 – Olean, Eldred	Eastern terminus of PA 346
1.000 mi = 1.609 km; 1.000 km = 0.621 mi: Concurrency terminus
