= Pennsylvania Route 59 =

State highway in Pennsylvania, US

Pennsylvania Route 59

Route information
- Maintained by PennDOT
- Length: 39.03 mi (62.81 km)
- Tourist routes: Longhouse National Scenic Byway

Major junctions
- West end: US 6 in Warren
- PA 321 in Klondike; PA 770 in Marshburg; US 219 in Timbuck; PA 646 in Ormsby
- East end: US 6 in Smethport

Location
- Country: United States
- State: Pennsylvania
- Counties: Warren, McKean

Highway system
- Pennsylvania State Route System; Interstate; US; State; Scenic; Legislative
← PA 58	→ PA 60

Pennsylvania Route 59 (PA 59) is a 39-mile (63 km) long state highway located in northwest Pennsylvania. The route links Warren to Smethport, terminating at U.S. Route 6 (US 6) at both ends. PA 59 acts as a northerly bypass to US 6, directly connecting Warren and Smethport while US 6 dips south to serve Kane and Mount Jewett.

This highway also serves the U. S. Army Corps of Engineers' Kinzua Dam and LS Power's Seneca Pumped Storage Generating Station.

== Route description ==
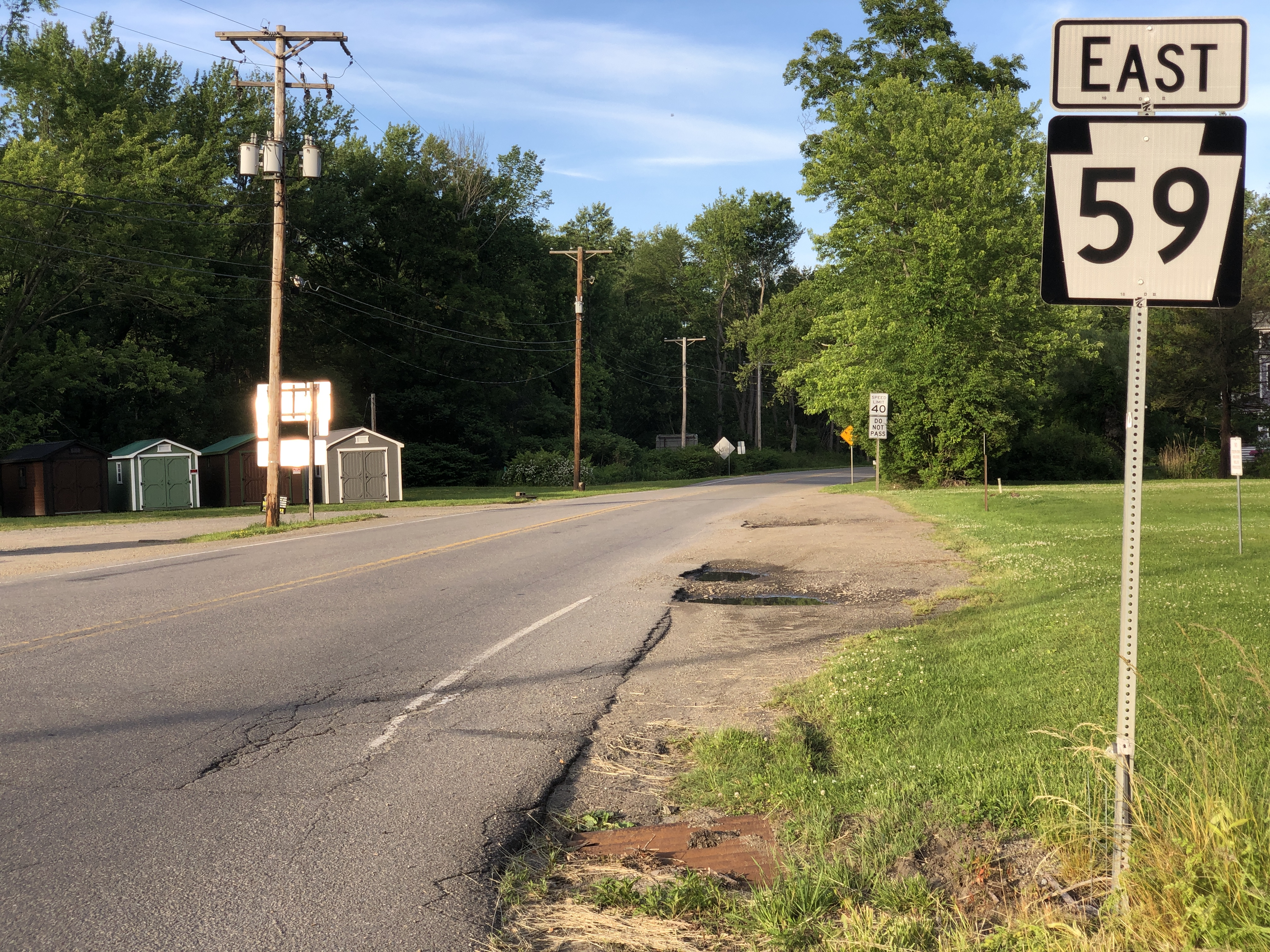
PA 59 eastbound at US 6 near Warren

PA 59 begins at an intersection with US 6 in Mead Township, Warren County, heading east on two-lane undivided Kinzua Road. The road passes through areas of woods and homes in the community of Rogertown, turning to the northeast. The route heads into the Allegheny National Forest, running along the southeastern bank of the Allegheny River. PA 59 turns east and passes south of the U. S. Army Corps of Engineers' Kinzua Dam, at which point it also passes north of LS Power's Seneca Pumped Storage Generating Station. The road curves north and northeast as it runs along the eastern shore of the Allegheny Reservoir. The route heads east and crosses Kinzua Bay near the Kinzua Point information center.

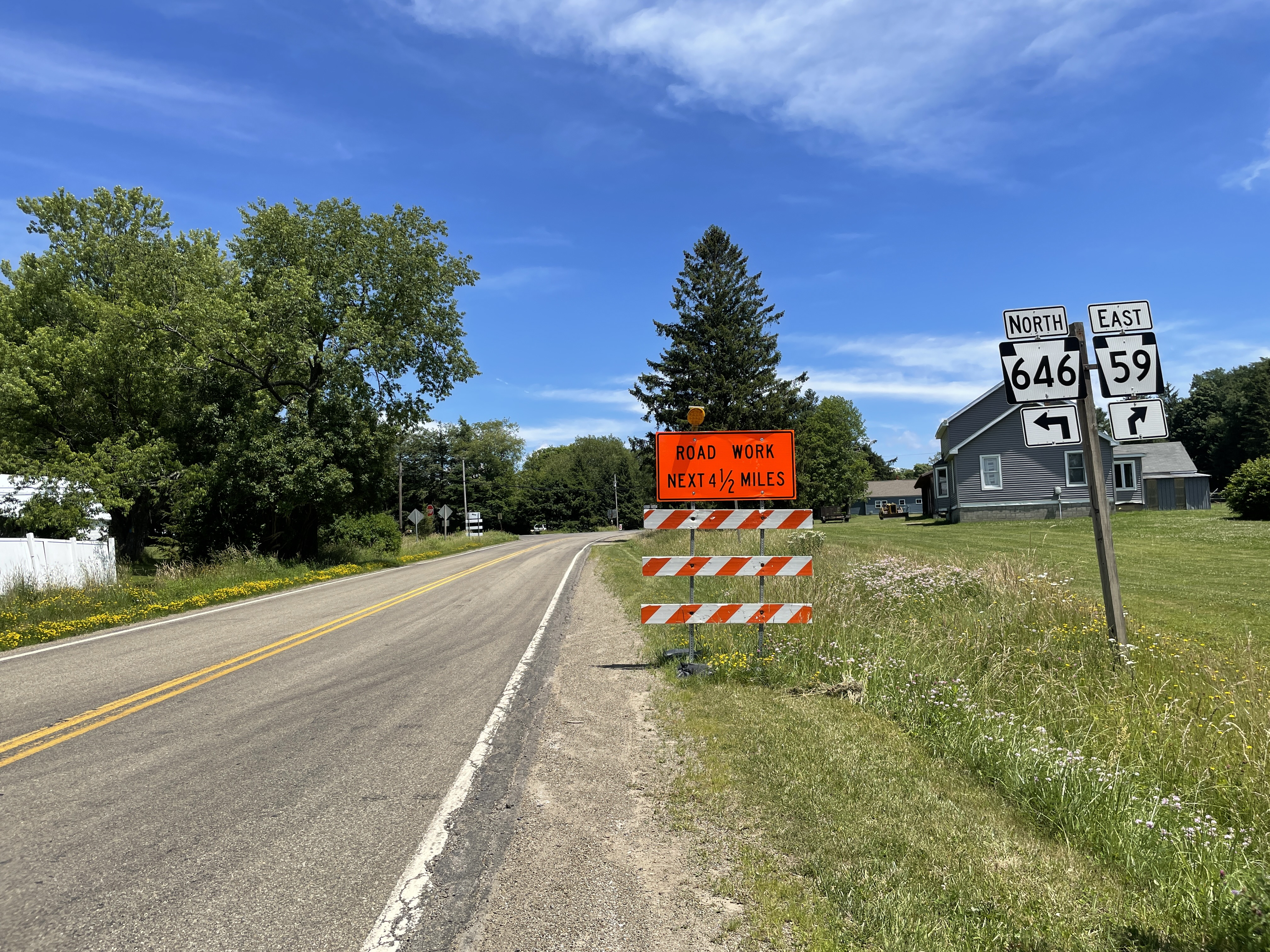
PA 59 eastbound approaching PA 646 in Ormsby

PA 59 enters Corydon Township in McKean County and continues east through more of the Allegheny National Forest as an unnamed road. The route comes to an intersection with PA 321, where that route turns east for a concurrency with PA 59 and the name becomes Kane-Marshburg Road. The road leaves the national forest and heads through more forested areas with scattered homes as PA 321 splits to the northwest as it crosses into Lafayette Township. PA 59 heads through more wooded areas with some fields and residences as an unnamed road, coming to a junction with the western terminus of PA 770 in Marshburg and turning southeast. The route runs through more forests, passing through a small tract of the Allegheny National Forest. Farther southeast, the road crosses US 219 in Timbuck and becomes Mt. Alton Road.

PA 59 passes southwest of Federal Correctional Institution, McKean and heads through more wooded areas with some fields and homes, passing through Lafayette. The route passes south of Bradford Regional Airport and runs through Mount Alton, heading through more forests. The road enters Keating Township and becomes Mt. Alton-Ormsby Road, passing through Backus and crossing under the Buffalo and Pittsburgh Railroad's B&P Main Line Subdivision line. PA 59 heads northeast and passes a few fields before intersecting the southern terminus of PA 646 in Ormsby. At this point, the route turns east as Smethport Ormsby Road and runs through more forests. The road passes a few farm fields before heading into the borough of Smethport and running past homes on West Main Street. PA 59 comes to its eastern terminus at another intersection with US 6, at which point West Main Street continues east as part of that route.

The portion of PA 59 between Longhouse Drive and PA 321 is part of the Longhouse National Scenic Byway, a Pennsylvania Scenic Byway and National Forest Scenic Byway.

== Major intersections ==
County	Location	mi	km	Destinations	Notes
Warren	Mead Township	0.00	0.00	US 6 (Grand Army of the Republic Highway) – Sheffield, Warren	Western terminus
McKean	Corydon Township	17.76	28.58	PA 321 south (Kane-Marshburg Road) – Kane	Western terminus of PA 321 overlap
McKean	Lafayette Township	19.80	31.87	PA 321 north (Sugar Run Road)	Eastern terminus of PA 321 overlap
McKean	Lafayette Township	21.07	33.91	PA 770 east (West Warren Road) – Bradford	Western terminus of PA 770
McKean	Lafayette Township	25.73	41.41	US 219 (Buffalo–Pittsburgh Highway) – Ridgway, Bradford	
McKean	Keating Township	34.28	55.17	PA 646 north (Ridge Road) – Olean	Southern terminus of PA 646
McKean	Smethport	39.03	62.81	US 6 (Main Street / Marvin Street) – Coudersport	Eastern terminus
1.000 mi = 1.609 km; 1.000 km = 0.621 mi: Concurrency terminus
