= Pennsylvania Route 46 =

State highway in Pennsylvania, US

Pennsylvania Route 46

Route information
- Maintained by PennDOT
- Length: 43.0 mi (69.2 km)

Major junctions
- South end: PA 120 in Emporium
- North end: US 219 / PA 346 in Bradford

Location
- Country: United States
- State: Pennsylvania
- Counties: Cameron, McKean

Highway system
- Pennsylvania State Route System; Interstate; US; State; Scenic; Legislative
← US 46	→ PA 47

Pennsylvania Route 46 (PA 46) is a 43-mile-long (69 km) state highway that is located in northern Pennsylvania in the United States.

The southern terminus of the route is situated at PA 120 in Emporium. The northern terminus is located at the Bradford Bypass, carrying U.S. Route 219 (US 219) and PA 346, in Bradford, roughly two miles south of the New York-Pennsylvania border.

== History ==
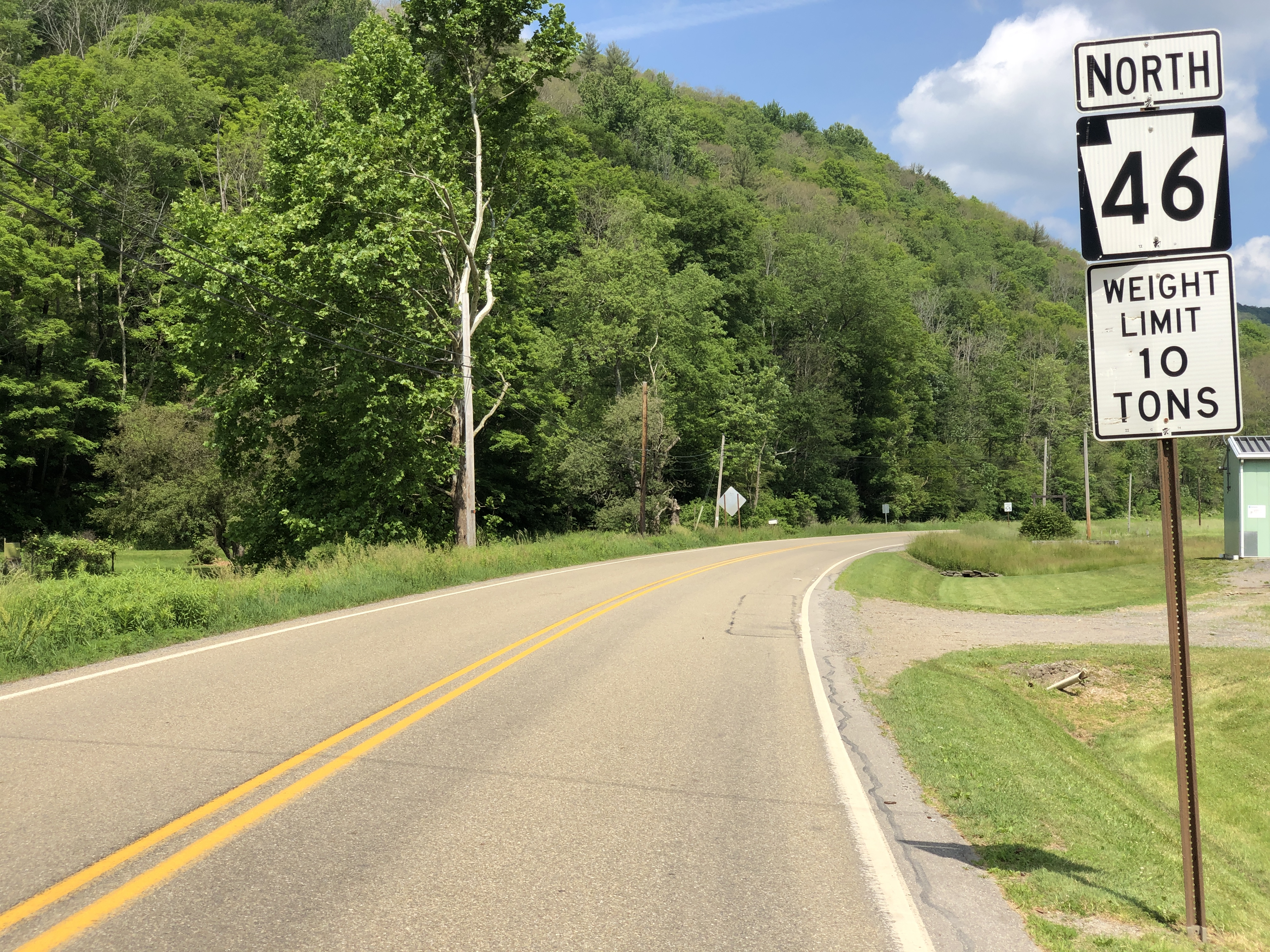
PA 46 northbound in Shippen Township

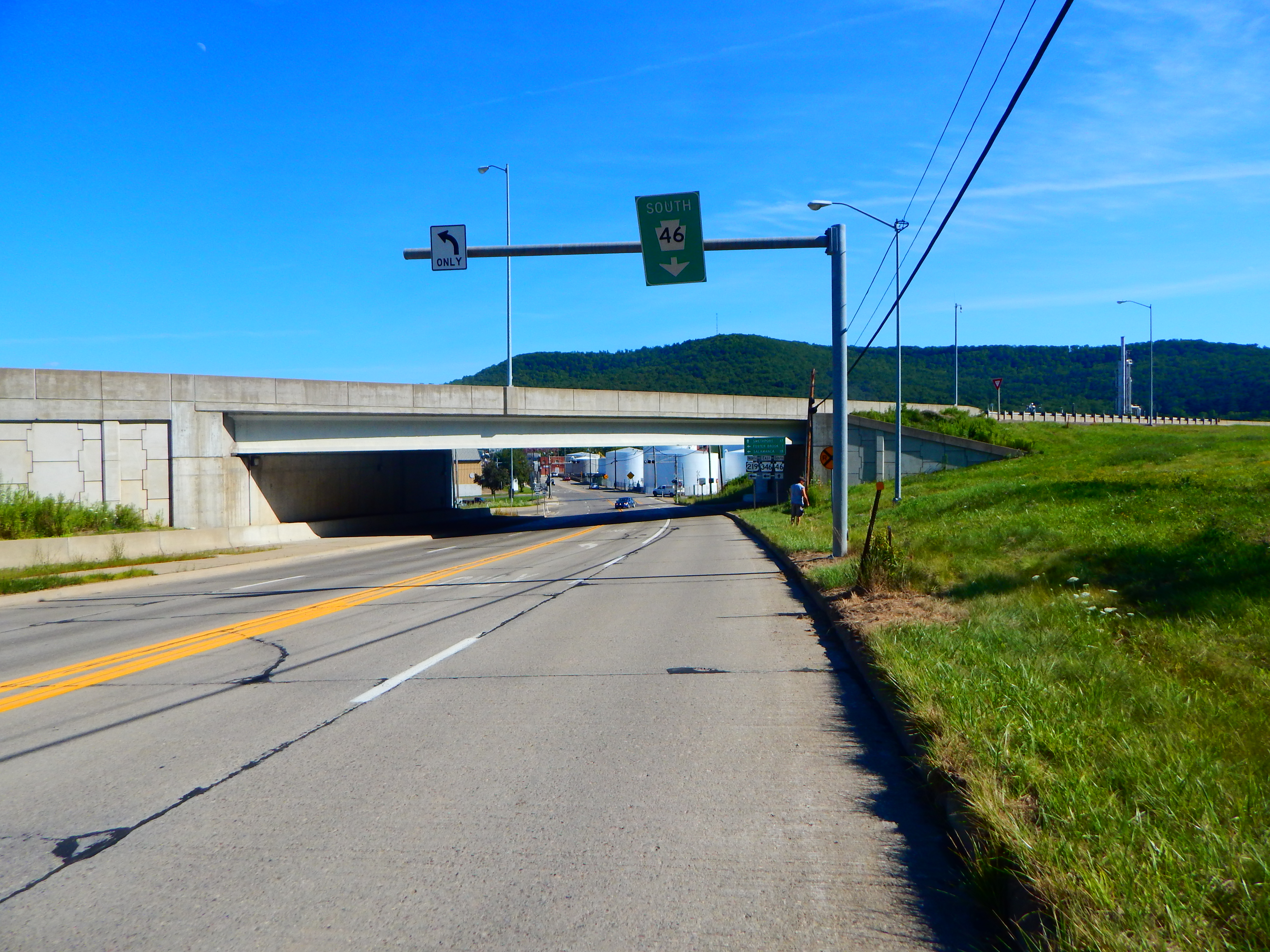
PA 46 from its northern terminus in Bradford

PA 46 was first signed in 1927, extending from U.S. Route 6 in Smethport north to US 219 in Bradford. The route was extended southward to Emporium in 1928, when the eastern segment of Pennsylvania Route 47, which ran along present-day PA 46 from PA 120 in Emporium to US 6 in Smethport, was decommissioned after only one year of service.

== Major intersections ==
County	Location	mi	km	Destinations	Notes
Cameron	Emporium	0.0	0.0	PA 120 (4th Street / Bucktail Trail Highway) – Renovo, St. Marys	Southern terminus
McKean	Norwich Township	17.7	28.5	PA 146 west – Clermont, Mt. Jewett	Eastern terminus of PA 146
McKean	Keating Township	25.0	40.2	US 6 east (East Street) – Coudersport	South end of US 6 concurrency
McKean	Smethport	25.8	41.5	US 6 west (East Street) – Kane	North end of US 6 concurrency
McKean	Keating Township	28.7	46.2	PA 446 north – Eldred	Southern terminus of PA 446
McKean	Foster Township	35.9	57.8	PA 646 (Main Street) – Aiken, Olean	
McKean	Foster Township	39.4	63.4	PA 246 east (Looker Mountain Trail) – Eldred	Western terminus of PA 246
McKean	Bradford	43.0	69.2	US 219 / PA 346 – Ridgway, Foster Brook, Salamanca	Interchange; northern terminus
1.000 mi = 1.609 km; 1.000 km = 0.621 mi: Concurrency terminus

== PA 46 Truck ==
Pennsylvania Route 46 Truck
- Location: Cameron County and McKean County
- Existed: 2013–present

Pennsylvania Route 46 Truck is a truck route that bypasses a weight-restricted bridge over the Pidgeon Hollow Run in Norwich Township, Pennsylvania. The route follows US 6, PA 155 and PA 120.

It was signed in 2013. The bridge was completely reconstructed in 2017, but the route is still signed as of May 2022.
