= Pennsylvania Route 47 =

Pennsylvania Route 47 was a state highway split into three segments in north Pennsylvania. The three segments were simultaneously assigned in 1927; two were decommissioned in 1928, and the last was decommissioned in 1930; however, the three segments were never connected.

The three segments are now part of other Pennsylvania state highways.

- The western segment, from Meadville to Pittsfield Township, became part of Pennsylvania Route 27 in 1928.
- The central segment, from Emporium to Smethport, became part of Pennsylvania Route 46 in 1928.
- The eastern segment, from Kingsley to Carbondale, was decommissioned in 1930 as it was already part of U.S. Route 106. This section is now Pennsylvania Route 106. (Pennsylvania Route Families 40-49 (PA 47) - Central PA/MD Roads - Timothy Reichard)

Browse numbered routes
← PA 46	PA	→ PA 48
