= Pennsylvania Route 246 =

State highway in McKean County, Pennsylvania, US

Pennsylvania Route 246

Route information
- Maintained by PennDOT
- Length: 8.456 mi (13.609 km)
- Existed: 1928–present

Major junctions
- West end: PA 46 in Corwins Corners
- PA 646 in Summit
- East end: PA 346 in Prentisvale

Location
- Country: United States
- State: Pennsylvania
- Counties: McKean

Highway system
- Pennsylvania State Route System; Interstate; US; State; Scenic; Legislative
← PA 245	→ PA 247

Pennsylvania Route 246 (PA 246) is an 8-mile-long (13 km) state highway located in McKean County in Pennsylvania. The western terminus is at PA 46 in Corwins Corners. The eastern terminus is at PA 346 in Prentisvale.

== Route description ==
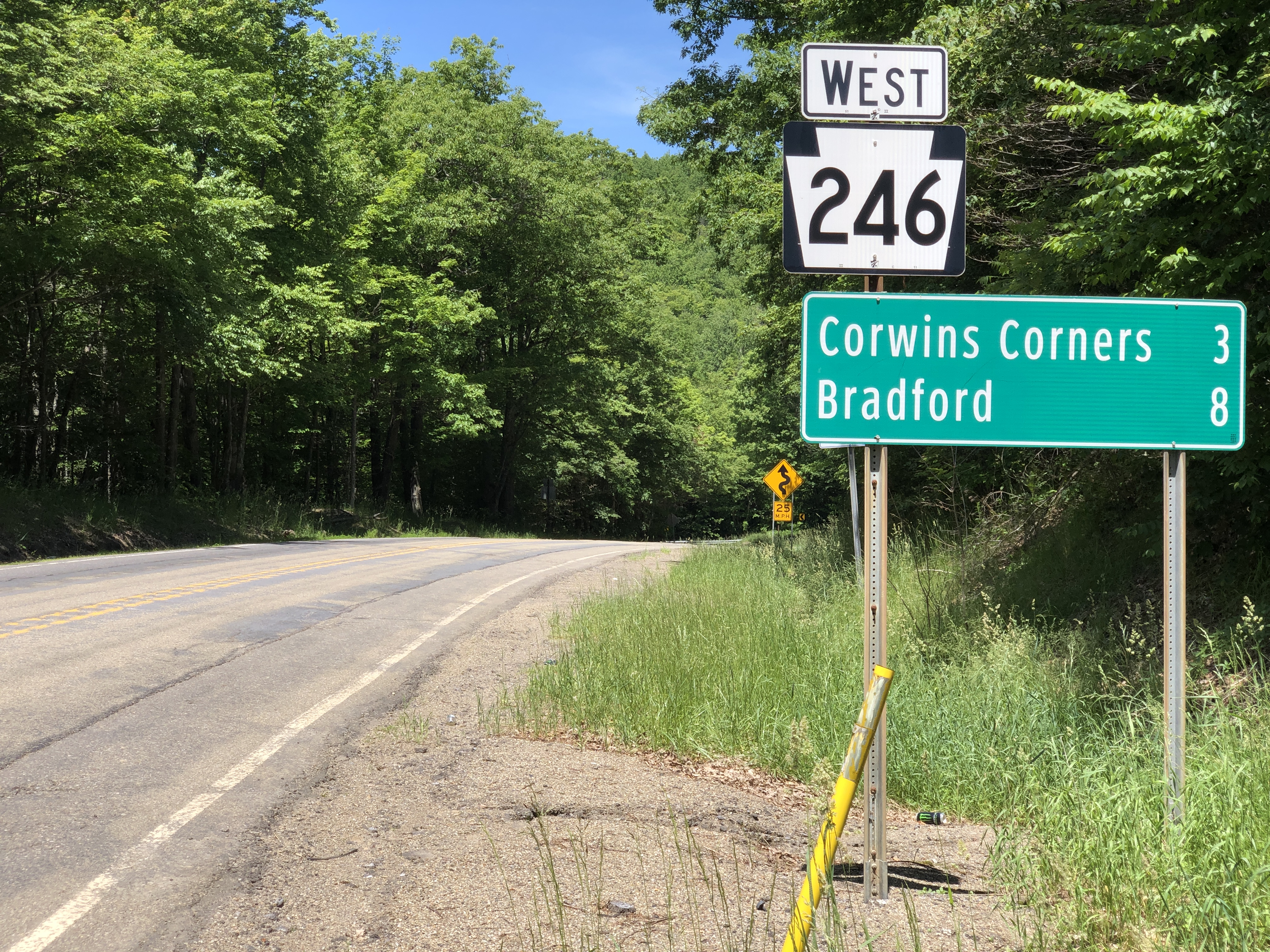
PA 246 westbound at PA 646 in Otto Township

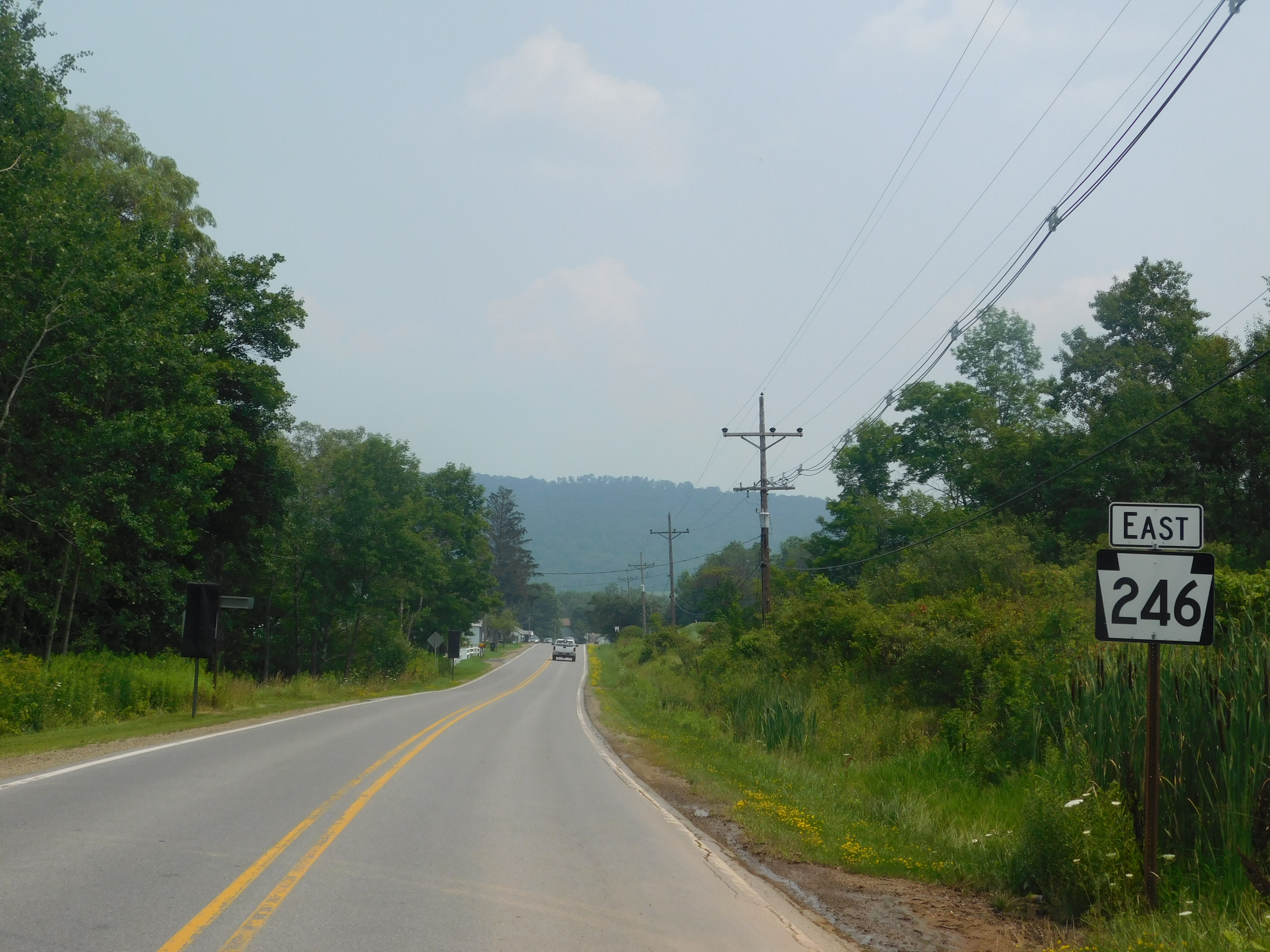
PA 246 eastbound in Otto Township

PA 246 begins at an intersection with PA 46 in the community of Corwins Corners in Foster Township, heading east-northeast on two-lane undivided Looker Mountain Trail. The road passes wooded homes surrounded by forested mountains, running through the community of Dallas City. The route winds east through more forested areas as it comes into Otto Township and crosses PA 646 in the community of Summit. Past this intersection, PA 246 continues southeast through more mountainous areas. Upon reaching the residential community of Rixford, the route makes a turn to the northeast and heads into a mix of farmland and rural homes. PA 246 continues east through more rural areas to its eastern terminus at PA 346 in the community of Prentisvale.

== Major intersections ==
The entire route is in McKean County.

Location	mi	km	Destinations	Notes
Foster Township	0.000	0.000	PA 46 (Kendall Avenue)	Western terminus of PA 246
Otto Township	2.911	4.685	PA 646 (Old Plank Road)	
Otto Township	8.456	13.609	PA 346 (Derrick Road)	Eastern terminus of PA 246
1.000 mi = 1.609 km; 1.000 km = 0.621 mi
