= Foster Brook, Pennsylvania =

Unincorporated community in Pennsylvania, US

Coordinates: 41°58′37″N 78°36′55″W

- census-designated place
- Interactive map of Foster Brook, Pennsylvania
- Country: United States
- State: Pennsylvania
- County: McKean

Area
  - Total: 3.17 sq mi (8.21 km^{2})
  - Land: 3.15 sq mi (8.16 km^{2})
  - Water: 0.019 sq mi (0.05 km^{2})

Population (2020)
  - Total: 1,127
  - Density: 357.6/sq mi (138.06/km^{2})
- Time zone: UTC-5 (Eastern (EST))
  - Summer (DST): UTC-4 (EDT)
- FIPS code: 42-26960

Foster Brook is a census-designated place in Foster Township, McKean County in the state of Pennsylvania, United States. The community is just north of Bradford, along Pennsylvania Route 346. As of the 2022 American Community Survey, Foster Brook was estimated to have 1,069 residents.

== Demographics ==
Historical population
Census	Pop.	Note	%±
2020	1,127		—
U.S. Decennial Census

== Education ==
It is in the Bradford Area School District.
