= Pennsylvania Route 546 =

State highway in McKean County, Pennsylvania, US

Pennsylvania Route 546

Route information
- Maintained by PennDOT
- Length: 3.586 mi (5.771 km)
- Existed: 1928–present

Major junctions
- South end: PA 346 in Otto Township
- North end: Duke Center Road at New York state line in Otto Township

Location
- Country: United States
- State: Pennsylvania
- Counties: McKean

Highway system
- Pennsylvania State Route System; Interstate; US; State; Scenic; Legislative
← PA 545	→ PA 547

Pennsylvania Route 546 (PA 546) is a 3.586-mile-long (5.771 km) state highway in the northernmost regions of McKean County, Pennsylvania. The route, known locally as Oil Valley Road, begins at an intersection with PA 346 in the community of Duke Center (located in Otto Township). The highway heads northward, through mountainous regions before crossing the state line and into New York.

PA 546 was designated in the 1928 numbering of state highways in the commonwealth. The route was under construction and unpaved for two years afterward, and by 1930, the route was complete and has remained virtually intact since.

== Route description ==
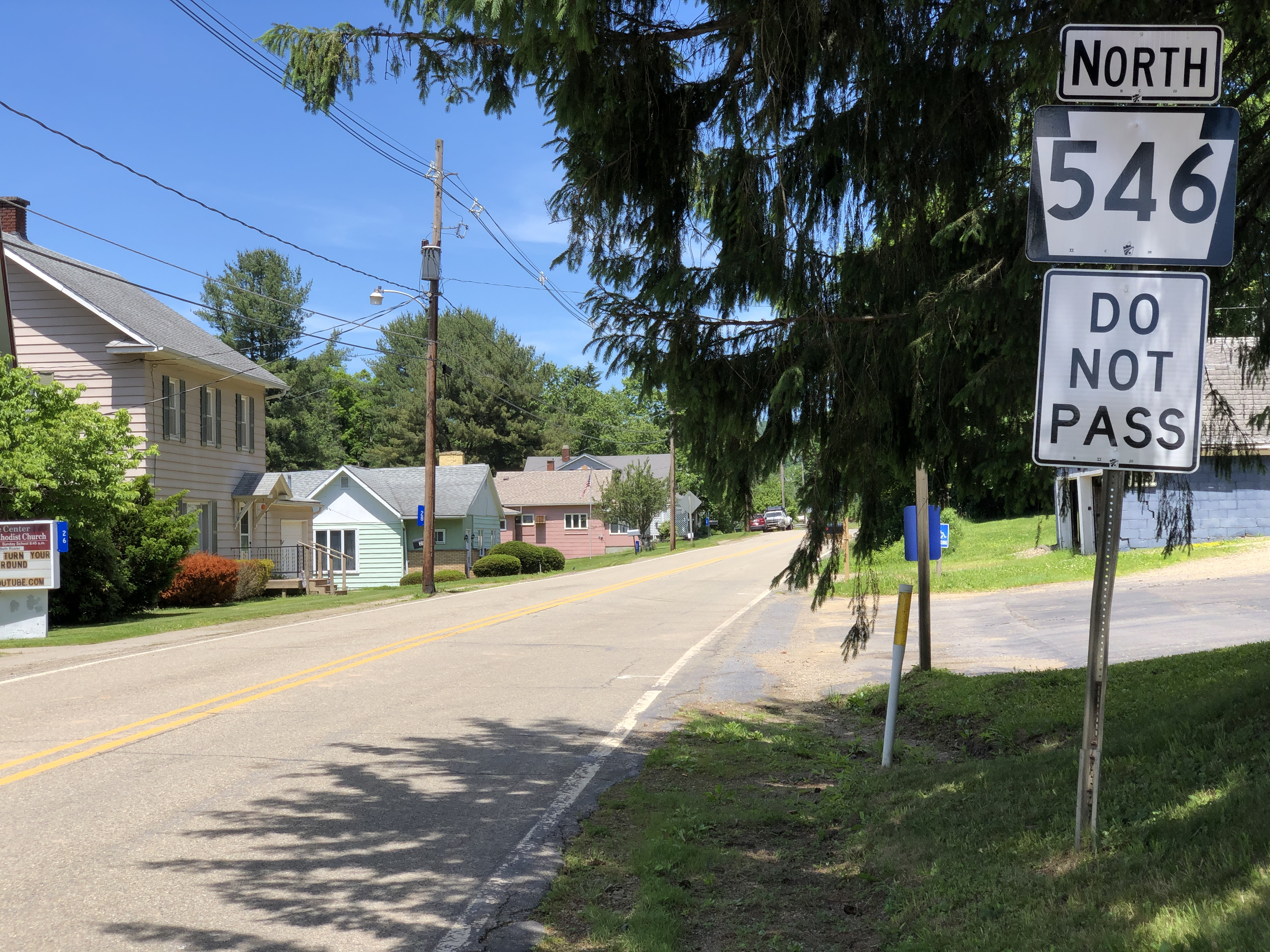
PA 546 heading northward from the PA 346 junction in Duke Center

PA 546 begins at an intersection with PA 346 in the community of Duke Center. The highway, known locally as Oil Valley Road, progresses to the northeast, intersecting with a short connector back to PA 346 (SR 9112). Duke Center is small and PA 546 runs along the center of the community. The community and PA 546 run along the base of the 2,000 feet (610 m) mountain. PA 546 parallels the Knapp Creek, and after an intersecting with Galespie Hollow Road, the highway leaves Duke Center.

Continuing northward, the highway enters the community of Oil Valley, which the road is named for. At an intersection with Bootleg Hollow, Knapp Creek turns off PA 546. A short distance later, the highway passes through several taller mountains, some reaching as high as 2,200 feet (670 m) in elevation. The route crosses the state line into New York and continues northward as the unnumbered Duke Center Road, which continues for about one half of a mile to an intersection with NY 16 in Knapp Creek, New York.

== History ==
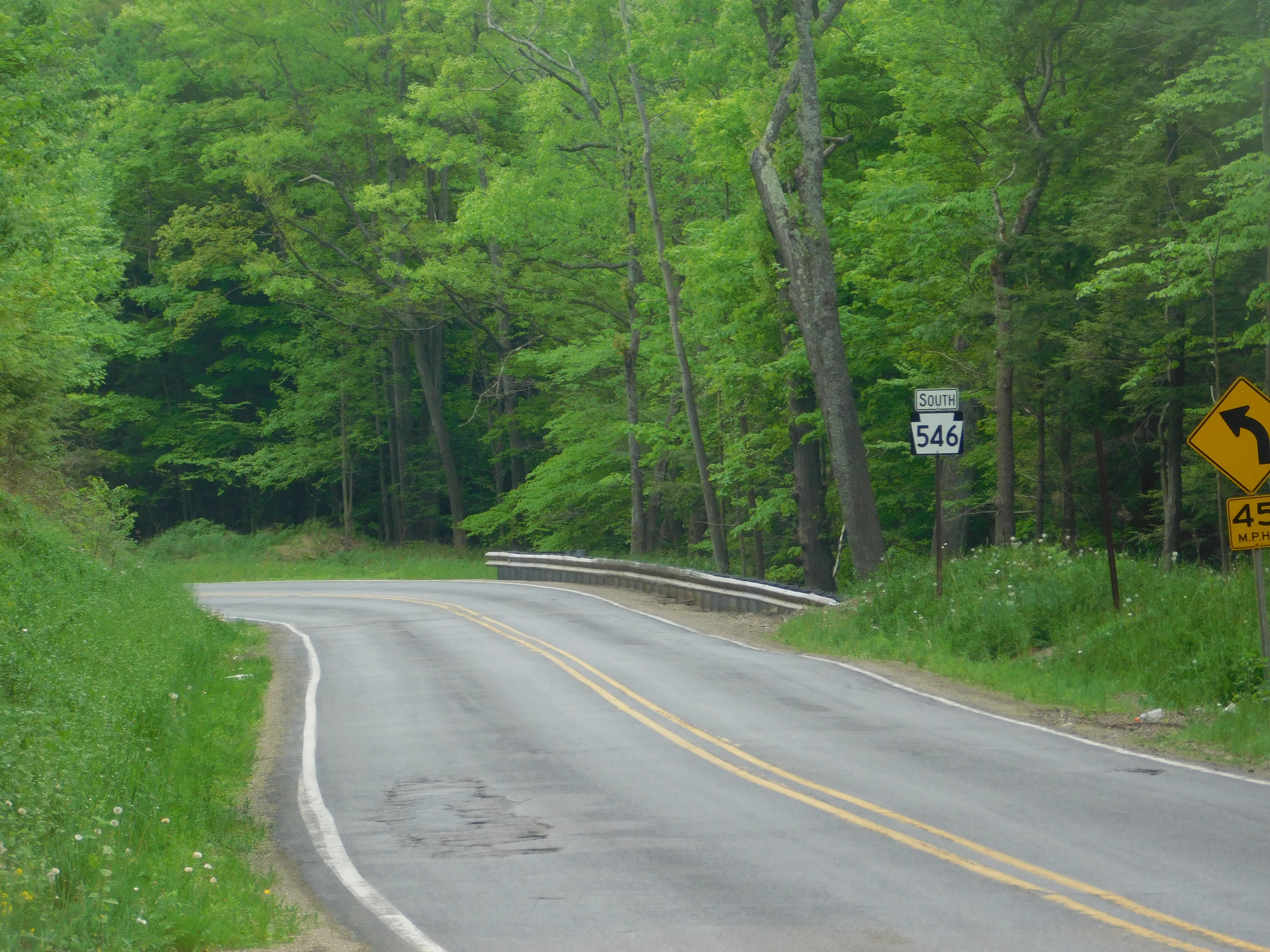
PA 546 heading south from the state line

PA 546 began in the 1928 numbering of state highways in the commonwealth of Pennsylvania. The route was assigned at the time on its current alignment, but the highway was not completely constructed. At the time, the sections of PA 546 from the community of Duke Center to a location 2 miles (3.2 km) north were incomplete. By 1929, this missing piece was completed, and was paved. However, the road was not complete, as there was an unpaved piece of PA 546 from that point This unpaved area was finished by the next year. PA 546, although, has remained intact in terms of alignment since its assignment in 1928.

Duke Center Road, the road that continues north into New York, was originally designated as County Route 45 in Cattaraugus County, but the designation was decommissioned and turned over to the town of Allegany.

== Major intersections ==
The entire route is in Otto Township, McKean County.

mi	km	Destinations	Notes
0.000	0.000	PA 346 (Main Street)	Southern terminus; village of Duke Center
3.586	5.771	Duke Center Road	New York state line; northern terminus
1.000 mi = 1.609 km; 1.000 km = 0.621 mi
