= Rixford, Pennsylvania =

Unincorporated community in Pennsylvania, US

- Unincorporated community
- Location within Pennsylvania Location within the United States
- Coordinates: 41°55′34″N 78°29′39″W
- Country: United States
- State: Pennsylvania
- County: McKean
- Township: Otto
- Elevation: 1,598 ft (487 m)
- Time zone: UTC-5 (Eastern (EST))
  - Summer (DST): UTC-4 (EDT)
- ZIP code: 16745
- Area code: 814
- GNIS feature ID: 1185154

Rixford is an unincorporated community in McKean County, Pennsylvania, United States. The community is located along Pennsylvania Route 246, 8.3 miles (13.4 km) east-southeast of Bradford. Rixford has a post office with ZIP code 16745.
