= Bradford Area School District =

School district in Pennsylvania

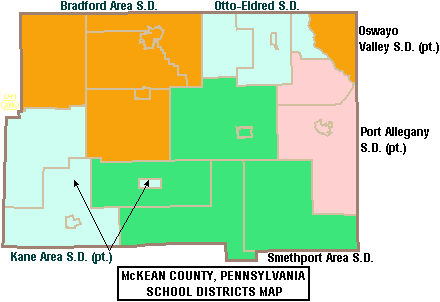

Address
- 150 Lorana Avenue Bradford, Pennsylvania, 16701; United States

District information
- Type: Public

Students and staff
- District mascot: Owl
- Colors: Black, Red, & White

Other information
- Website: http://www.bradfordareaschools.org/

The Bradford Area School District is a mid-sized, rural and suburban public school district in north central Pennsylvania, in the United States.

The district encompasses approximately 250 square miles (650 km^{2}). It serves the City of Bradford, Borough of Lewis Run and Bradford Township, Corydon Township, Foster Township and Lafayette Township in McKean County, Pennsylvania.

== Schools ==
The district operates four buildings:

=== Elementary schools (K-5) ===
School name	Address
George G. Blaisdell K-2 ES	265 Constitution Av. Bradford, PA 16701
School Street Elementary 3-5 ES	76 School Street; Bradford, PA 16701

=== Middle school (6-8) ===
Floyd C. Fretz Middle School
140 Lorana Av., Bradford, PA 16701

=== High school (9-12) ===
Bradford Area High School
81 Interstate Parkway, Bradford, PA 16701

== Extracurriculars ==
The district offers a variety of clubs, activities and sports.

=== Athletics ===
The district offers:

Fall sports:

- Boys Golf
- Boys Soccer
- Cross Country
- Football - Varsity, Junior Varsity and Freshmen
- Girls Golf
- Girls Soccer
- Girls Tennis
- Girls Volleyball

Winter sports:

- Boys Basketball - Varsity and Freshmen
- Girls Basketball - Varsity and Freshmen
- Swimming
- Wrestling

Spring sports:

- Baseball
- Softball
- Boys Tennis
- Track
