= Seneca Pumped Storage Generating Station =

Hydroelectric Power Plant

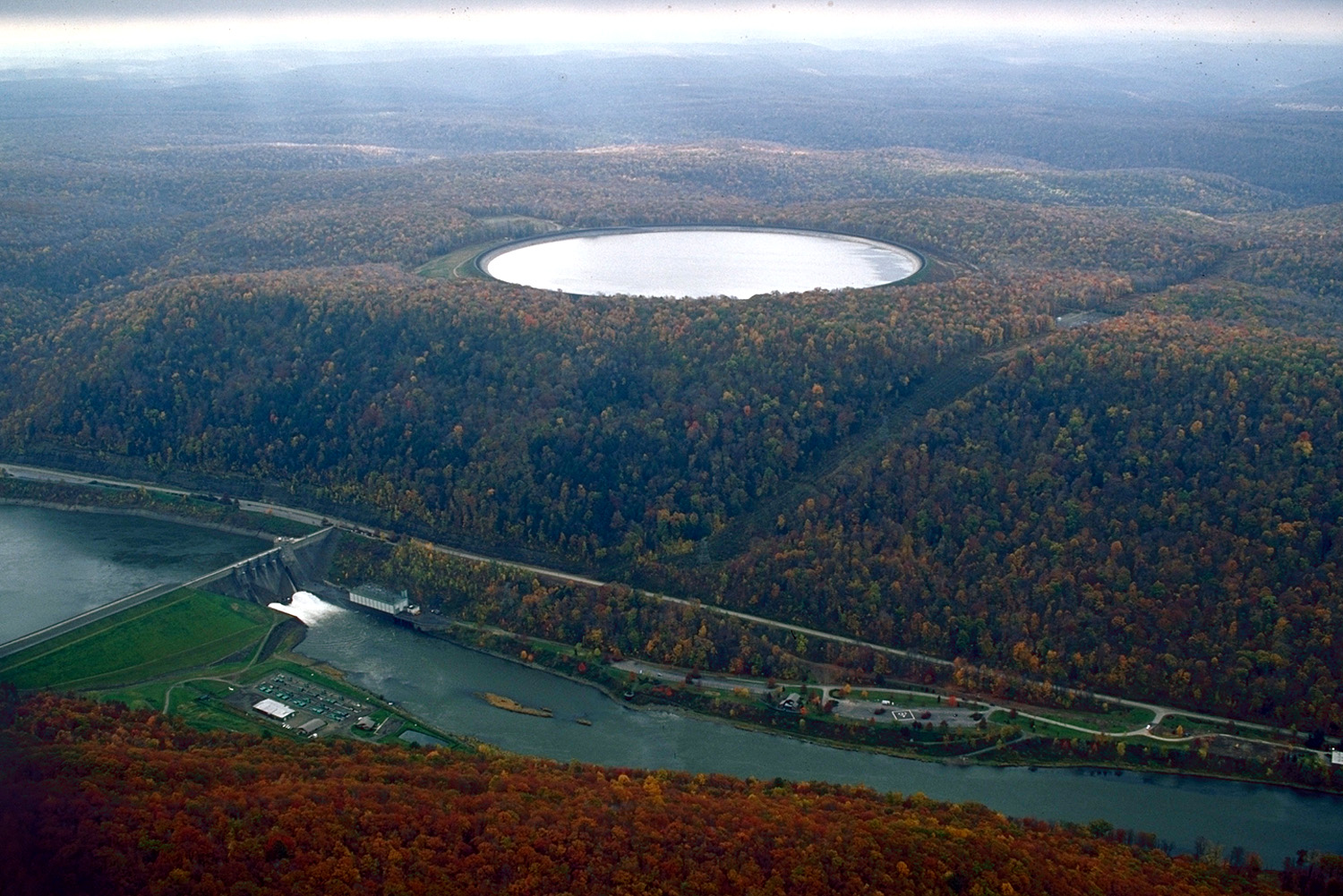
- Country: United States
- Location: Mead Township, Warren County, Pennsylvania
- Coordinates: 41°50′20.58″N 79°0′13.45″W
- Status: Operational
- Commission date: 1970
- Owner: LS Power
- Site area: 226.7 acres (91.7 ha)

Power generation
- Units operational: 1 × 26.1 MW; 1 × 205.9 MW
- Make and model: pump turbine (1) turbine (1)
- Nameplate capacity: 437.9 MW; 469 MW
- Annual net output: 559,059 MW h (2014)
- Adjacent to Kinzua Dam in the Allegheny National Forest

The Seneca Pumped Storage Generating Station is a hydroelectric power plant using pumped storage of water to generate electric power. It is located near Warren, Pennsylvania in Warren County.

Seneca Station is colocated with the Kinzua Dam. The dam was built by the United States Army Corps of Engineers to regulate the Allegheny River as part of a larger flood control project, and, as a secondary role, to generate hydroelectric power. It created the Allegheny Reservoir, a lake that stretches 25 miles (40 km) upriver, nearly to Salamanca, New York within the Allegany Reservation of the Seneca Nation of Indians. The station generates, on average, approximately 559 gigawatt hours of electric energy every year. It has generated hundreds of millions of dollars in profits for its operators since opening in 1970.

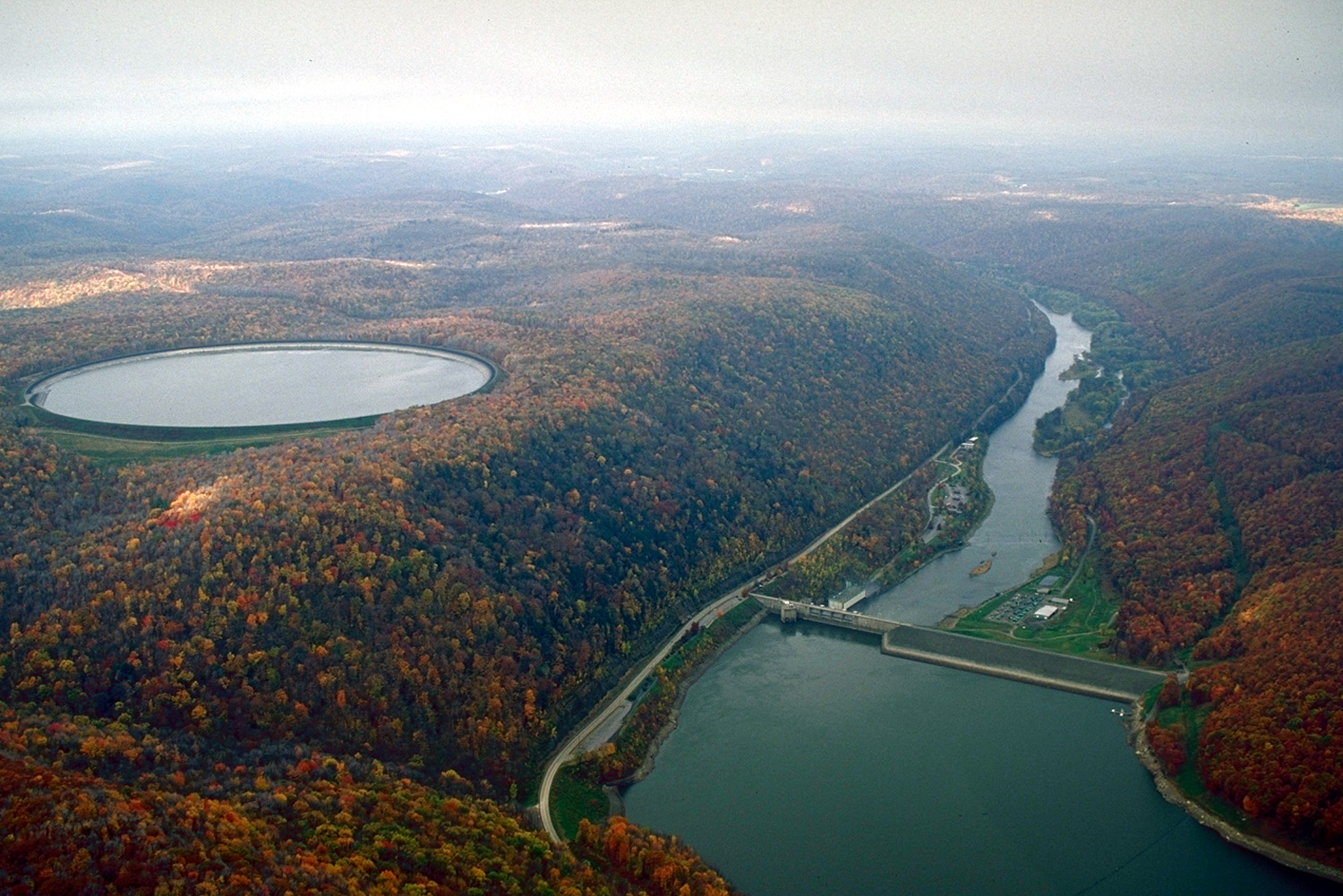
The Seneca Pumped Storage Generating Station reservoir. Kinzua Dam on the Allegheny River can be seen at lower right. View is downriver to the west.

The power plant, rated at 451 MW, was built by the Pennsylvania Electric Company and Cleveland Electric Illuminating Company. It began commercial operation in 1970. Through business mergers and acquisitions, the plant became owned by FirstEnergy, an operator of several base load (nuclear and coal-fired) power plants. Seneca was among 11 hydroelectric power stations that FirstEnergy agreed in 2013 to sell to LS Power of New York City.

Pumped storage plants function similarly to a storage battery; they absorb excess power generated by nearby power generators in off-peak hours, such as nighttime, using it to pump water into a reservoir. Later, when demand exceeds the base load, the flow of water from the reservoir generates additional electrical power to meet peak load demands. Like all storage schemes the facility is a net consumer of electricity due to losses in the cycle.
