= Bradford Township, McKean County, Pennsylvania =

Township in Pennsylvania, United States

Coordinates: 41°54′00″N 78°36′59″W

- Township
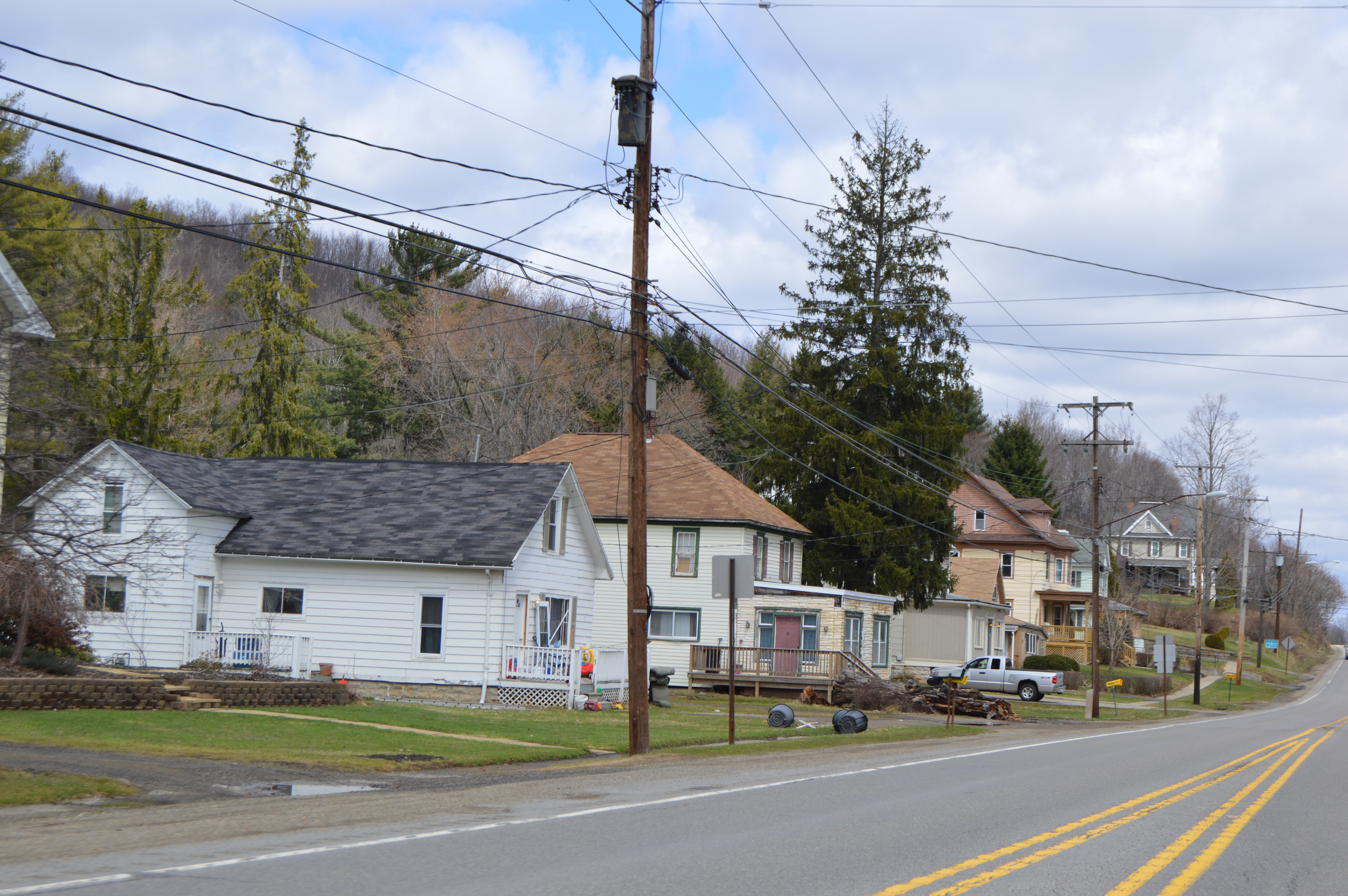
- Along U.S. Route 219 in Custer City

- Seal

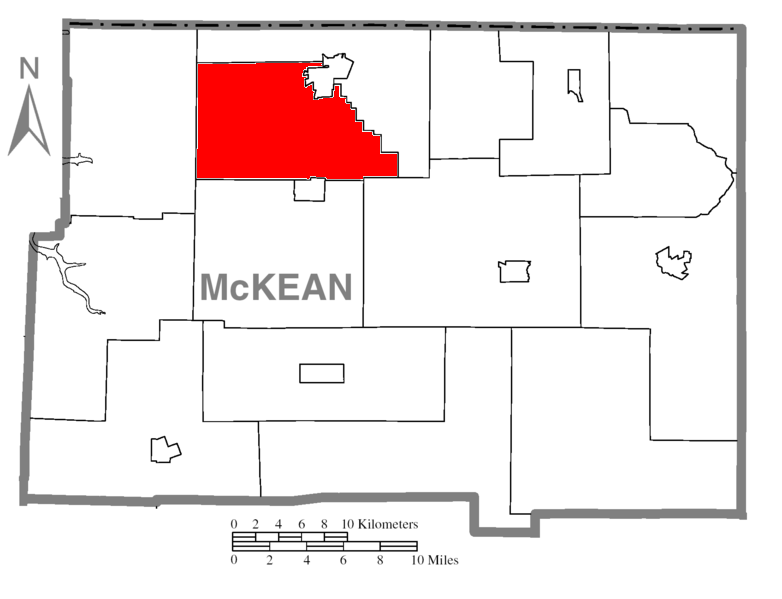
- Location in McKean County

- Location of McKean County in Pennsylvania
- Country: United States
- State: Pennsylvania
- County: McKean
- Settled: 1793
- Incorporated: 1828

Area
  - Total: 56.44 sq mi (146.19 km^{2})
  - Land: 56.09 sq mi (145.27 km^{2})
  - Water: 0.36 sq mi (0.92 km^{2})

Population (2020)
  - Total: 4,793
  - Density: 85.0/sq mi (32.81/km^{2})
- Time zone: UTC-5 (Eastern (EST))
  - Summer (DST): UTC-4 (EDT)
- ZIP Codes: 16701 (Bradford); 16725 (Custer City)
- Area code: 814
- FIPS code: 42-083-08048
- Website: bradfordtwpmckeancnty.jimdofree.com

Bradford Township is a township in McKean County, Pennsylvania, United States. The population was 4,793 at the 2020 census.

== Geography ==
The township is in northern McKean County. It is bordered to the north by the city of Bradford, to the north and east by Foster Township, to the southeast by Keating Township, to the south by Lafayette Township, and to the west by Corydon Township. The unincorporated communities of South Bradford, Degolia, and Custer City are in the central part of the township, along U.S. Route 219. Howard is in the southern part of the township.

According to the U.S. Census Bureau, Bradford Township has a total area of 56.0 square miles (145.0 km^{2}), of which 55.6 square miles (144.0 km^{2}) are land and 0.35 square miles (0.91 km^{2}), or 0.63%, are water. The township is drained by the East and West Branches of Tunungwant Creek, which flow north and join in the city of Bradford.

== Demographics ==
Historical population
Census	Pop.	Note	%±
2000	4,816		—
2010	4,805		−0.2%
2020	4,793		−0.2%
U.S. Decennial Census

As of the census of 2010, there were 4,805 people, 1,745 households, and 1,251 families residing in the township. The population density was 86.7 inhabitants per square mile (33.5/km^{2}). There were 1,826 housing units at an average density of 33.3 per square mile (12.9/km^{2}). The racial makeup of the township was 98.03% White, 0.58% African American, 0.52% Native American, 0.39% Asian, 0.17% from other races, and 0.31% from two or more races. Hispanic or Latino of any race were 0.62% of the population.

There were 1,745 households, out of which 27.6% had children under the age of 18 living with them, 60.9% were married couples living together, 7.4% had a female householder with no husband present, and 28.3% were non-families. 24.0% of all households were made up of individuals, and 12.7% had someone living alone who was 65 years of age or older. The average household size was 2.43 and the average family size was 2.88.

In the township the population was spread out, with 20.1% under the age of 18, 12.5% from 18 to 24, 23.0% from 25 to 44, 25.2% from 45 to 64, and 19.2% who were 65 years of age or older. The median age was 41 years. For every 100 females there were 90.4 males. For every 100 females age 18 and over, there were 87.6 males.

The median income for a household in the township was $44,302, and the median income for a family was $51,424. Males had a median income of $36,114 versus $24,386 for females. The per capita income for the township was $20,397. About 3.1% of families and 6.4% of the population were below the poverty line, including 8.6% of those under age 18 and 3.8% of those age 65 or over.

== Education ==
Its school district is Bradford Area School District.

University of Pittsburgh at Bradford is in the township.
