= Federal Correctional Institution, McKean =

Medium-security prison in Pennsylvania, US

Coordinates: 41°47′54″N 78°41′14″W

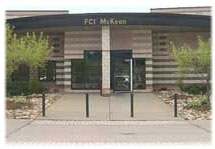
- Interactive map of Federal Correctional Institution, McKean
- Location: Lafayette Township, McKean County, near Lewis Run, Pennsylvania
- Status: Operational
- Security class: Medium-Security (with minimum-security prison camp)
- Population: 1,500 (330 in prison camp)
- Opened: 1989
- Managed by: Federal Bureau of Prisons

The Federal Correctional Institution, McKean (FCI McKean) is a medium-security United States federal prison for male inmates in Pennsylvania. It is operated by the Federal Bureau of Prisons, a division of the United States Department of Justice. An adjacent satellite prison camp houses minimum-security male offenders.

FCI McKean is located in Lafayette Township, in northwest Pennsylvania between the towns of Bradford and Kane, 90 miles south of Buffalo, New York.

== Notable incidents ==
=== 2013 escape ===
On August 21, 2013, Locksley Milwood, who was serving a sentence for participating in a drug ring that smuggled ecstasy, methamphetamine, and marijuana into the U.S. from Canada, escaped from the satellite prison camp adjacent to FCI McKean. The prison camp houses minimum-security inmates in dormitory housing, has a relatively low staff-to-inmate ratio and limited or no perimeter fencing. Officers from the Pennsylvania State Police and surrounding municipal departments were alerted and participated in the search. Several hours later, an officer from the Bradford Township Police Department stopped a vehicle and found Milwood inside. Milwood pleaded guilty to escape in December 2013 and was sentenced to two additional months in prison. He was then incarcerated at the Federal Medical Center, Lexington in Kentucky and was released in January 2017.

== Notable inmates ==
Inmate name	Register number	Photo	Status	Details
Alphonse Persico	05517-054		Serving a life sentence.	Soldier and former acting boss of the Colombo crime family; convicted for the murder of William Cutolo on December 28, 2007. On February 27, 2009, Persico was sentenced to life in prison without parole for the Cutolo murder.[19]
Chaka Fattah	72340-066		Currently in custody of RRM Philadelphia.	Philadelphia politician who served as a Democratic U.S. Representative from Pennsylvania from 1995–2016; sentenced to 10 years in imprisonment for racketeering.
Wesley Snipes	43355-018		Released from custody in 2013; served 2 years.	Actor, film producer and martial artist; convicted in 2008 of failing to file tax returns; Snipes was also ordered to pay $17 million in back taxes and IRS penalties.
Joseph P. Ganim	14466-014		Released from custody in 2010; served 7 years.	Democratic Mayor of Bridgeport, Connecticut from 1991 to 2003; convicted in 2003 of racketeering, conspiracy and other charges for receiving over $500,000 from private businesses in exchange for steering city contracts to them; reelected in 2015.
Denny McLain	04000-018		Released from custody in 2003; served 6 years.	Major League baseball pitcher and two-time Cy Young Award winner; convicted in 1996 of money laundering, conspiracy, theft and mail fraud for stealing $3 million from the pension fund of a company he owned.
Prabhu Ramamoorthy	56234-039		Serving a 9-year sentence; scheduled for release in 2026.	Sexually assaulted a woman on a plane while she was sleeping next to him.
Christopher Green	18486-050		Serving a life sentence	Killed four men, including two postal workers, and injuring another man while robbing a post office in Montclair, New Jersey in March 1995.

== See also ==
- List of U.S. federal prisons
- Federal Bureau of Prisons
- Incarceration in the United States
