= Lafayette Township, Pennsylvania =

Township in Pennsylvania, US

Coordinates: 41°52′36″N 78°37′35″W

- Township
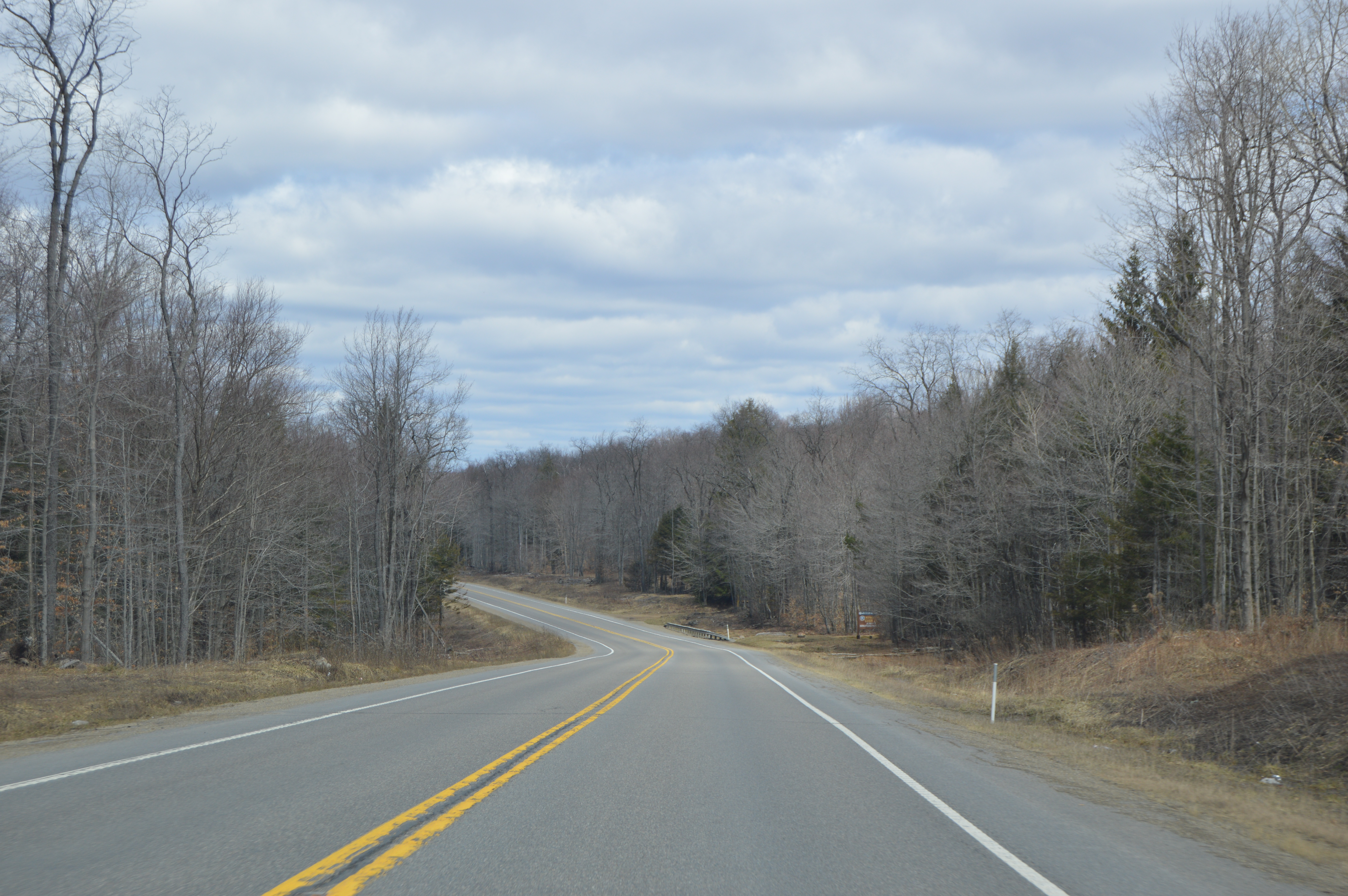
- Along U.S. Route 219 south of Lewis Run

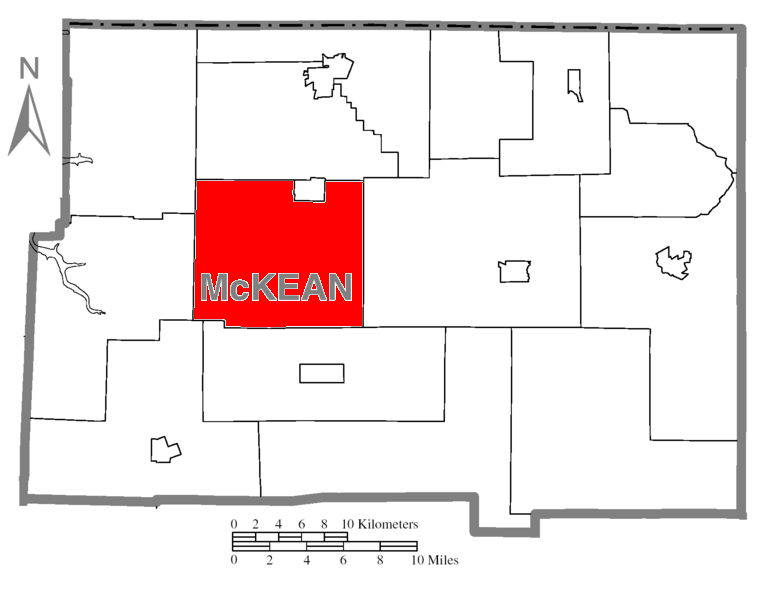
- Map of McKean County, Pennsylvania highlighting Lafayette Township

- Map of McKean County, Pennsylvania
- Country: United States
- State: Pennsylvania
- County: McKean
- Settled: 1823
- Incorporated: 1842

Area
  - Total: 71.50 sq mi (185.18 km^{2})
  - Land: 71.41 sq mi (184.95 km^{2})
  - Water: 0.089 sq mi (0.23 km^{2})

Population (2020)
  - Total: 1,766 ▼
  - Estimate (2022): 2,023
  - Density: 33.5/sq mi (12.93/km^{2})
- Time zone: UTC-5 (Eastern (EST))
  - Summer (DST): UTC-4 (EDT)
- Area code: 814
- FIPS code: 42-083-40808

Lafayette Township is a township in McKean County, Pennsylvania, United States. The population was 1,766 at the 2020 census.

== Geography ==
According to the United States Census Bureau, the township has a total area of 71.2 square miles (184 km^{2}), of which 71.2 square miles (184 km^{2}) is land and 0.01% is water.

=== Climate ===
According to the Köppen Climate Classification system, Lafayette Township has a humid continental climate, abbreviated "Dfb" on climate maps.

== Demographics ==
Historical population
Census	Pop.	Note	%±
2000	2,337		—
2010	2,350		0.6%
2020	1,766		−24.9%
2022 (est.)	2,023		14.6%
U.S. Decennial Census

As of the census of 2000, there were 2,337 people, 424 households, and 276 families residing in the township. The population includes inmates at the Federal Correctional Institution, McKean. The population density was 32.8 inhabitants per square mile (12.7/km^{2}). There were 673 housing units at an average density of 9.5/sq mi (3.7/km^{2}). The racial makeup of the township was 58.28% White, 31.88% African American, 1.20% Native American, 0.94% Asian, 4.92% from other races, and 2.78% from two or more races. Hispanic or Latino of any race were 10.53% of the population.

There were 424 households, out of which 26.4% had children under the age of 18 living with them, 56.8% were married couples living together, 5.0% had a female householder with no husband present, and 34.7% were non-families. 29.5% of all households were made up of individuals, and 11.6% had someone living alone who was 65 years of age or older. The average household size was 2.29 and the average family size was 2.83.

In the township the population was spread out, with 8.7% under the age of 18, 7.6% from 18 to 24, 53.6% from 25 to 44, 23.7% from 45 to 64, and 6.4% who were 65 years of age or older. The median age was 36 years. For every 100 females there were 393.0 males. For every 100 females age 18 and over, there were 476.8 males.

The median income for a household in the township was $36,736, and the median income for a family was $44,125. Males had a median income of $29,297 versus $23,355 for females. The per capita income for the township was $9,699. About 5.9% of families and 7.0% of the population were below the poverty line, including 13.3% of those under age 18 and 7.0% of those age 65 or over.

== Government and infrastructure ==
Federal Correctional Institution, McKean is in the township.

== Transportation ==
Bradford Regional Airport is in the township.

== Education ==
The school district for the township is Bradford Area School District.
