= Pennsylvania Route 146 =

State highway in McKean County, Pennsylvania, US

Pennsylvania Route 146
- PA 146 in red and PA 146 Truck in blue

Route information
- Maintained by PennDOT
- Length: 10.144 mi (16.325 km)
- Existed: 1928–present

Major junctions
- West end: US 6 in Hamlin Township
- East end: PA 46 in Norwich Township

Location
- Country: United States
- State: Pennsylvania
- Counties: McKean

Highway system
- Pennsylvania State Route System; Interstate; US; State; Scenic; Legislative
← PA 145	→ PA 147

Pennsylvania Route 146 (PA 146) is a 10-mile-long (16 km) state highway located entirely within McKean County in the U.S. state of Pennsylvania. The western terminus of the route is at U.S. Route 6 in the Hamlin Township community of Marvindale. The eastern terminus is at Pennsylvania Route 46 south of Colegrove in Norwich Township.

== Route description ==
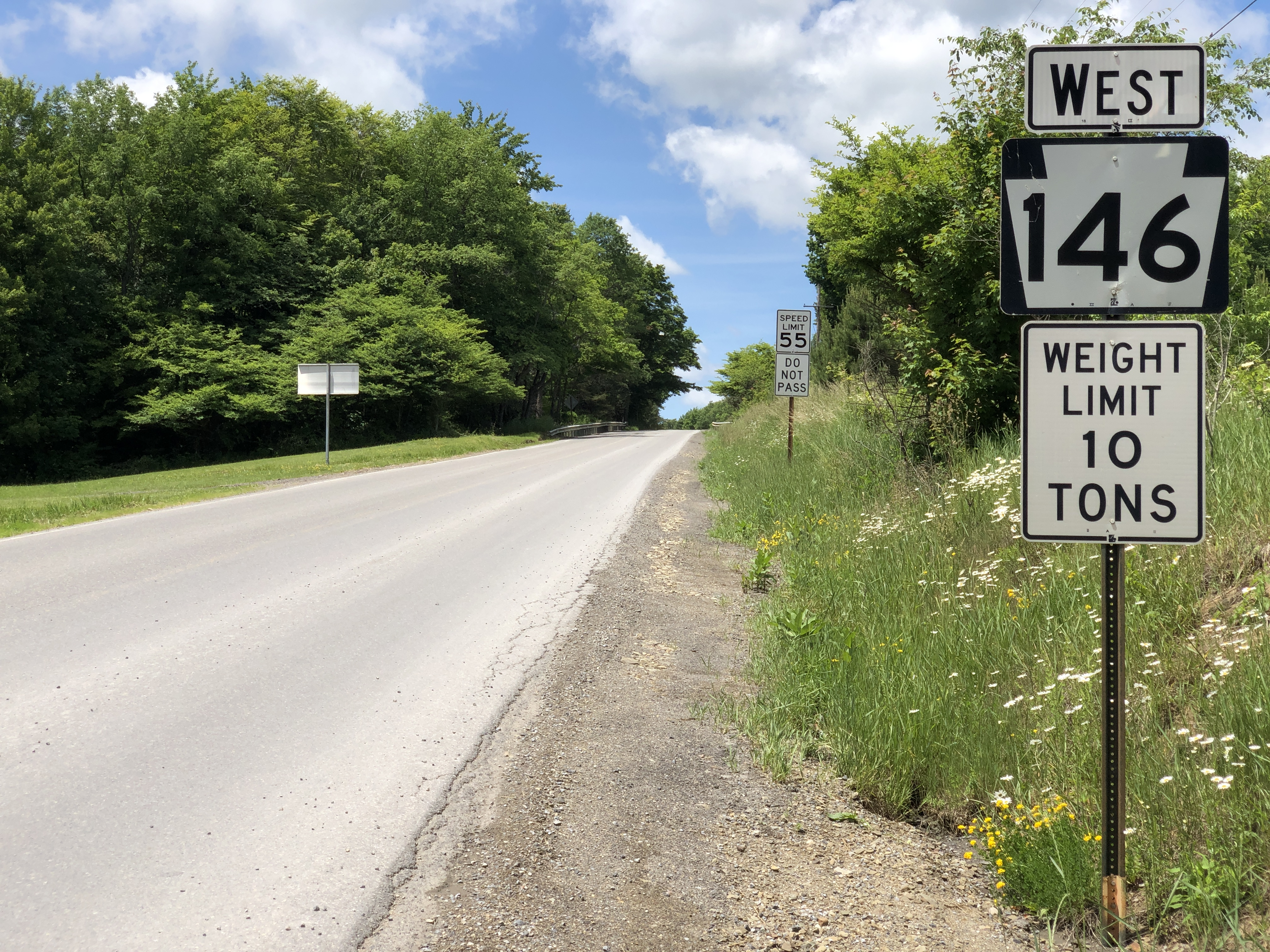
PA 146 westbound in Sergeant Township

PA 146 begins at an intersection with US 6 in the community of Marvindale in Hamlin Township, heading southeast on two-lane undivided Clermont Road. The road passes farm fields before heading into forested areas. The route crosses into Sergeant Township and becomes Red Mill Brook Road, continuing through woodland with a few patches of farms and rural homes. PA 146 makes a turn to the northeast to remain along Red Mill Brook Road as it continues through forests. The road curves to the east and enters Norwich Township. Here, the route heads into a mix of rural farms and residences, briefly turning south before turning east onto Berts Crossing. PA 146 continues past more farmland, crossing the Potato Creek before ending at PA 46.

== Major intersections ==
The entire route is in McKean County.

Location	mi	km	Destinations	Notes
Hamlin Township	0.000	0.000	US 6 (Grand Army of the Republic Highway) – Mount Jewett, Smethport	Western terminus
Norwich Township	10.144	16.325	PA 46 (Empourium Road) – Smethport, Emporium	Eastern terminus
1.000 mi = 1.609 km; 1.000 km = 0.621 mi

== PA 146 Truck ==
Pennsylvania Route 146 Truck
- Location: McKean County
- Existed: 2013–present

Pennsylvania Route 146 Truck is a truck route that bypasses PA 146 altogether, which prohibits trucks over 10 tons from traveling on the route. PA 146 also features a narrow bridge over the Potato Creek just west of its junction with PA 46. Because of these truck hazards along PA 146, a truck route was established in 2013 along US 6 and PA 46.
