= Rew, Pennsylvania =

Unincorporated community in Pennsylvania, US

Coordinates: 41°54′02″N 78°32′22″W

- CDP
- Interactive map of Rew, Pennsylvania
- Country: United States
- State: Pennsylvania
- County: McKean

Area
  - Total: 0.98 sq mi (2.54 km^{2})
  - Land: 0.98 sq mi (2.54 km^{2})
  - Water: 0 sq mi (0.00 km^{2})

Population (2020)
  - Total: 159
  - Density: 162.0/sq mi (62.56/km^{2})
- Time zone: UTC-5 (Eastern (EST))
  - Summer (DST): UTC-4 (EDT)
- ZIP codes: 16744
- FIPS code: 42-64296

Rew is a census-designated place (CDP) in McKean County in the U.S. state of Pennsylvania. The majority of the CDP, as defined in the 2020 U.S. Census, is in Foster Township. There are also portions in Otto Township and Keating Township.

The community is almost halfway between Bradford and the borough and county seat of Smethport.

A notable attraction in Rew is the Bradford Speedway, location of a 1958 NASCAR race won by Junior Johnson.

== Geography ==
Rew is located at the summit of a steep hill, where Pennsylvania Routes 46 and 646 intersect. It is located near the triple boundary of Foster, Otto and Keating Townships.

== Demographics ==
Historical population
Census	Pop.	Note	%±
2020	159		—
U.S. Decennial Census

As of the 2010 census, the population of Rew was 199, and was estimated 135 in the 2019 estimate. Every resident (100%) in the town was Caucasian. The median age and male ratio were also high, at 54.7 and 1:8:1, respectively.

== Education ==
The portion in Foster Township (the majority) is in the Bradford Area School District. The portion in Otto Township is in the Otto-Eldred School District. The portion in Keating Township is in the Smethport Area School District.
