= Lantz Corners, Pennsylvania =

Unincorporated community in Pennsylvania, US

- Unincorporated community
- Location within Pennsylvania Location within the United States
- Coordinates: 41°42′30″N 78°41′36″W
- Country: United States
- State: Pennsylvania
- County: McKean
- Township: Hamlin
- Elevation: 2,100 ft (640 m)
- Time zone: UTC-5 (Eastern (EST))
  - Summer (DST): UTC-4 (EDT)
- Area code: 814
- GNIS feature ID: 1209747

Lantz Corners is an unincorporated community in Hamlin Township in McKean County, Pennsylvania, United States. Lantz Corners is located at the intersection of U.S. Route 6 and U.S. Route 219 to the southwest of Mount Jewett.
