= East Smethport, Pennsylvania =

Unincorporated community in Pennsylvania, US

- Unincorporated community
- Location within Pennsylvania Location within the United States
- Coordinates: 41°48′31″N 78°25′10″W
- Country: United States
- State: Pennsylvania
- County: McKean
- Township: Keating
- Elevation: 1,512 ft (461 m)
- Time zone: UTC-5 (Eastern (EST))
  - Summer (DST): UTC-4 (EDT)
- ZIP code: 16730
- Area code: 814
- GNIS feature ID: 1173874

East Smethport is an unincorporated community in McKean County, Pennsylvania, United States. The community is located at the intersection of U.S. Route 6 and Pennsylvania Route 46 near the eastern border of Smethport. East Smethport has a post office with ZIP code 16730.
