= Hazel Hurst, Pennsylvania =

Unincorporated community in Pennsylvania, US

- Unincorporated community
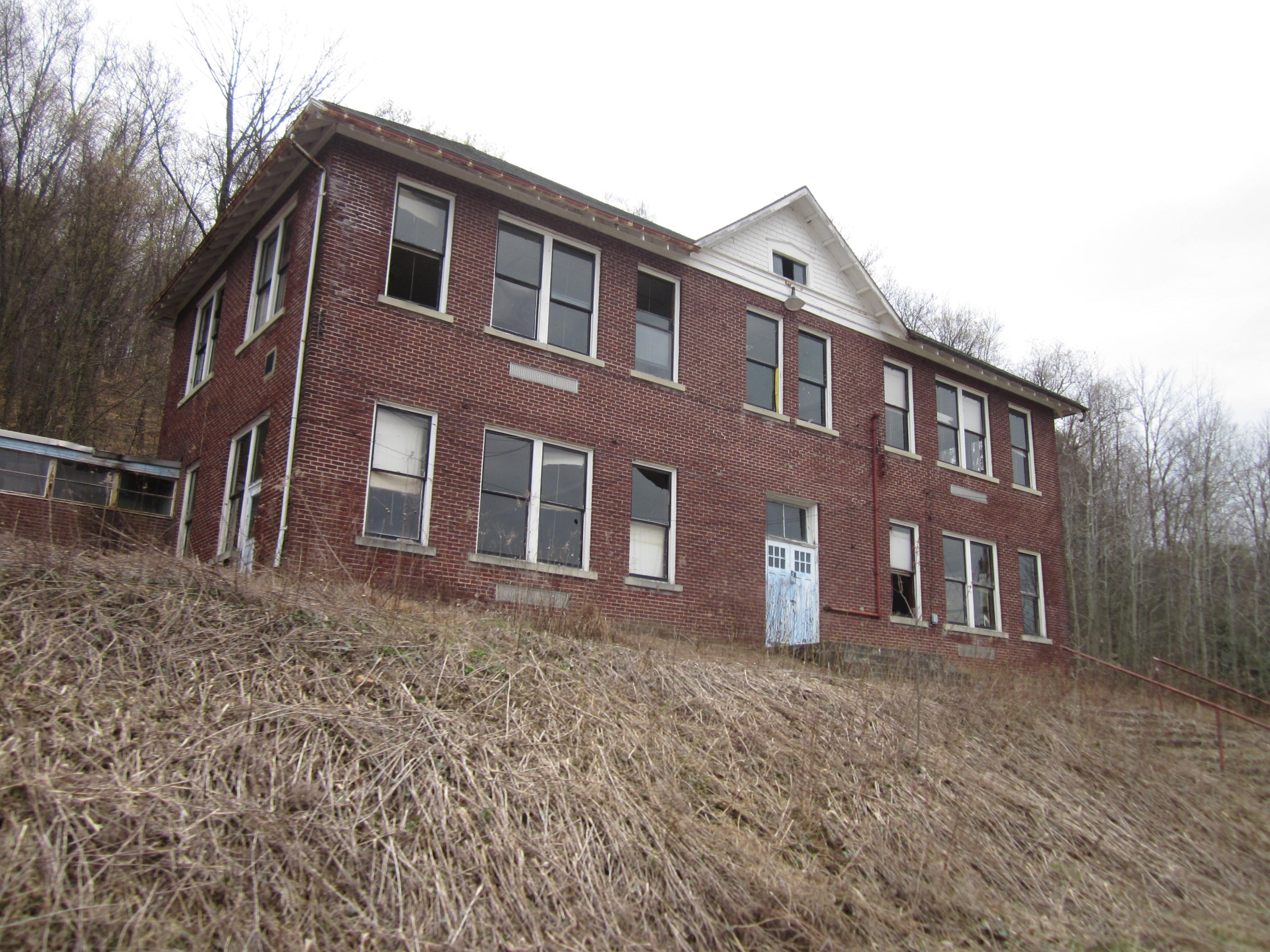
- Old high school building in Hazel Hurst, April 2012

- Location within Pennsylvania Location within the United States
- Coordinates: 41°42′21″N 78°34′57″W
- Country: United States
- State: Pennsylvania
- County: McKean
- Township: Hamlin
- Elevation: 1,729 ft (527 m)
- Time zone: UTC-5 (Eastern (EST))
  - Summer (DST): UTC-4 (EDT)
- ZIP code: 16733
- Area code: 814
- GNIS feature ID: 1176710

Hazel Hurst is an unincorporated community that is located near Marvin Creek in southern McKean County, Pennsylvania, United States.

== History and geography ==
The community is situated on U.S. Route 6 3.2 miles (5.1 km) east-southeast of Mount Jewett. Hazel Hurst has a post office with ZIP code 16733.

Hazel Hurst was once an important glass production town with multiple factories, all of which are now closed.

Due to the population drain, Hazel Hurst is sometimes considered a ghost town.

== See also ==
- List of ghost towns in Pennsylvania
