= Keating Township, McKean County, Pennsylvania =

Township in Pennsylvania, US

Coordinates: 41°53′00″N 78°28′59″W

- Township
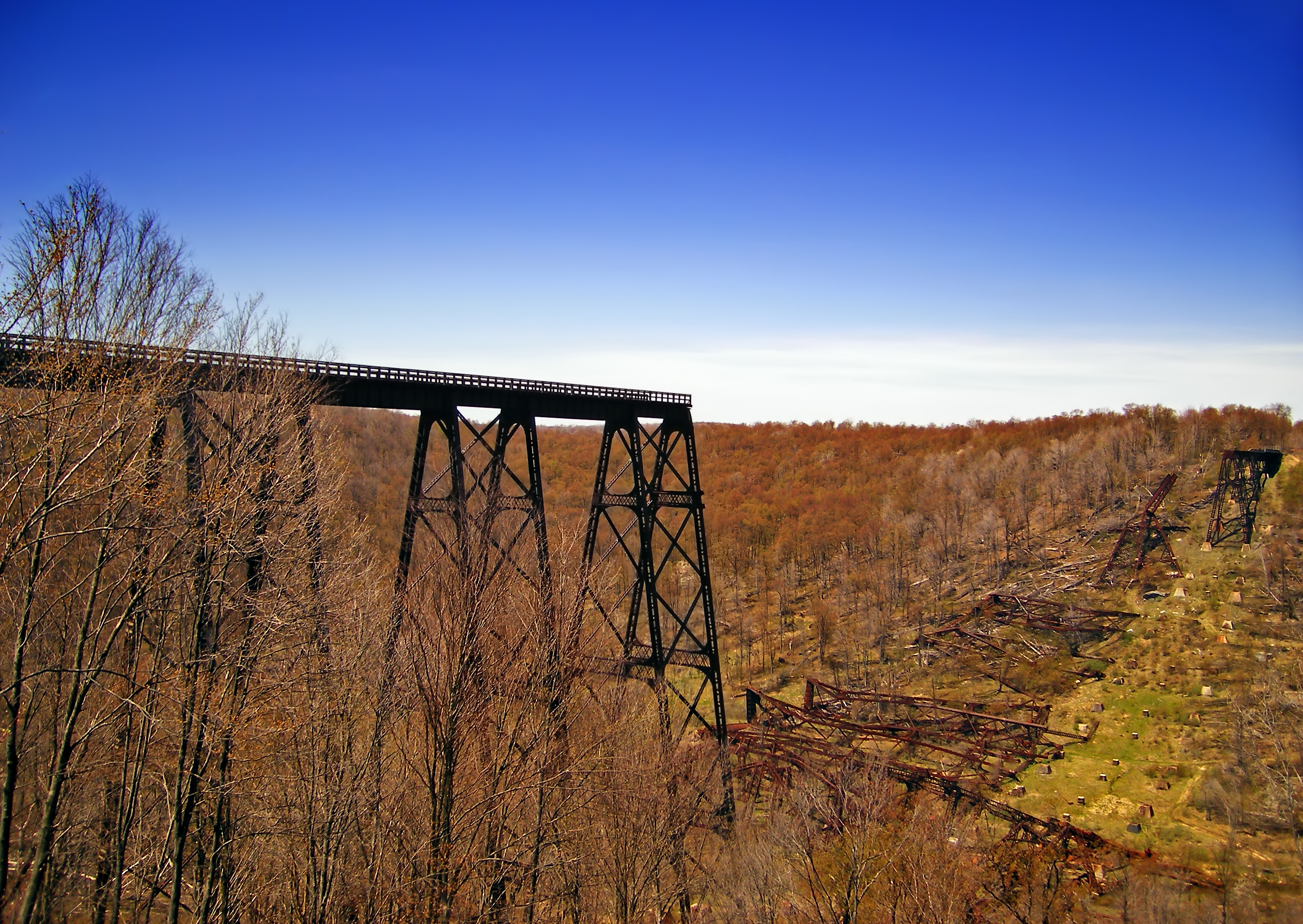
- Remains of the Kinzua Viaduct in Kinzua Bridge State Park

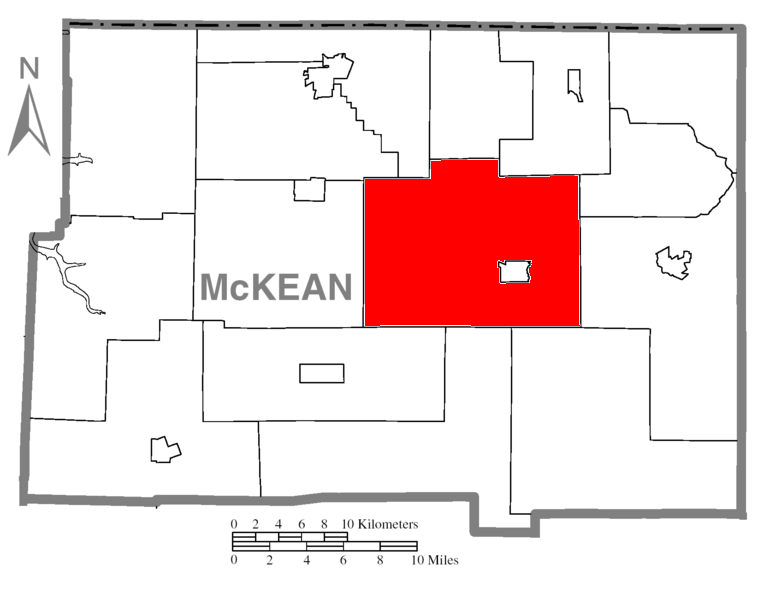
- Location in McKean County

- Location of McKean County in Pennsylvania
- Country: United States
- State: Pennsylvania
- County: McKean
- Settled: 1807
- Incorporated: 1824

Area
  - Total: 98.56 sq mi (255.3 km^{2})
  - Land: 98.25 sq mi (254.5 km^{2})
  - Water: 0.32 sq mi (0.83 km^{2})

Population (2020)
  - Total: 2,725 ▼
  - Estimate (2022): 2,684
  - Density: 27.32/sq mi (10.55/km^{2})
- Time zone: UTC-5 (Eastern (EST))
  - Summer (DST): UTC-4 (EDT)
- ZIP Codes: 16726 (Cyclone); 16730 (East Smethport); 16732 (Gifford); 16744 (Rew); 16749 (Smethport)
- Area code: 814
- FIPS code: 42-083-38912
- Website: https://keatingtwp.com/

Keating Township is a township in McKean County, Pennsylvania, United States. The population was 2,725 at the 2020 census.

== Origin ==
The township was named after John Keating, manager and trustee of the Ceres Company, which developed land in the area and sold it to settlers.

== Geography ==
Keating Township is in east-central McKean County and surrounds the borough of Smethport, a separate municipality and the county seat. U.S. Route 6 crosses the southern and eastern parts of the township, passing through Smethport, and leading east to Port Allegany and southwest to Mount Jewett. Pennsylvania Route 59 has its eastern terminus in Smethport and leads west to Warren. Pennsylvania Route 646 runs through the northwest part of the township, passing through the hamlets of Cyclone and Gifford.

According to the U.S. Census Bureau, Keating Township has a total area of 98.56 square miles (255.3 km^{2}), of which 98.25 square miles (254.5 km^{2}) are land and 0.32 square miles (0.83 km^{2}), or 0.32%, are water. Potato Creek, a tributary of the Allegheny River, crosses the eastern side of the township from south to north. Major tributaries of Potato Creek within the township include Marvin Creek, joining in Smethport, and Cole Creek, joining at Farmers Valley. The southwestern portion of the township is drained by Kinzua Creek, a west-flowing tributary of the Allegheny. The northern half of the former Kinzua Bridge, once the fourth-tallest railway bridge in the United States, is within the township.

== Demographics ==
Historical population
Census	Pop.	Note	%±
2000	3,087		—
2010	3,021		−2.1%
2020	2,725		−9.8%
2022 (est.)	2,684		−1.5%
U.S. Decennial Census

External videos
- The Keating Site : A prehistoric site, 5:30, Pennsylvania Historical and Museum Commission

As of the census of 2000, there were 3,087 people, 1,110 households, and 853 families residing in the township. The population density was 31.5 inhabitants per square mile (12.2/km^{2}). There were 1,293 housing units at an average density of 13.2/sq mi (5.1/km^{2}). The racial makeup of the township was 98.57% White, 0.13% African American, 0.13% Native American, 0.23% Asian, 0.03% from other races, and 0.91% from two or more races. Hispanic or Latino of any race were 0.55% of the population.

There were 1,110 households, out of which 33.7% had children under the age of 18 living with them, 65.1% were married couples living together, 7.2% had a female householder with no husband present, and 23.1% were non-families. 19.3% of all households were made up of individuals, and 9.5% had someone living alone who was 65 years of age or older. The average household size was 2.61 and the average family size was 2.97.

In the township the population was spread out, with 24.0% under the age of 18, 6.7% from 18 to 24, 27.1% from 25 to 44, 23.8% from 45 to 64, and 18.3% who were 65 years of age or older. The median age was 40 years. For every 100 females there were 102.2 males. For every 100 females age 18 and over, there were 99.5 males.

The median income for a household in the township was $32,798, and the median income for a family was $39,205. Males had a median income of $30,027 versus $21,992 for females. The per capita income for the township was $14,764. About 11.9% of families and 13.7% of the population were below the poverty line, including 20.3% of those under age 18 and 7.6% of those age 65 or over.
