= List of county seats in Pennsylvania =

The following is a list of the sixty-seven county seats of the Commonwealth of Pennsylvania. The list includes forty-two boroughs, twenty-four cities, and one town. The ranking is based on the populations of each county seat during the 2010 census.

| Rank | Photo | Seat name | Population (2010 census) | County | Municipal type |
|---|---|---|---|---|---|
| 1 | | Philadelphia | 1,526,006 | Philadelphia | City |
| 2 | | Pittsburgh | 305,704 | Allegheny | City |
| 3 | | Allentown | 118,032 | Lehigh | City |
| 4 | | Erie | 101,786 | Erie | City |
| 5 | | Reading | 88,082 | Berks | City |
| 6 | | Scranton | 76,089 | Lackawanna | City |
| 7 | | Lancaster | 59,322 | Lancaster | City |
| 8 | | Harrisburg | 49,528 | Dauphin | City |
| 9 | | York | 43,718 | York | City |
| 10 | | Wilkes-Barre | 41,498 | Luzerne | City |
| 11 | | Norristown | 34,324 | Montgomery | Borough |
| 12 | | Williamsport | 29,381 | Lycoming | City |
| 13 | | Easton | 26,800 | Northampton | City |
| 14 | | Lebanon | 25,477 | Lebanon | City |
| 15 | | New Castle | 23,273 | Lawrence | City |
| 16 | | Chambersburg | 20,268 | Franklin | Borough |
| 17 | | Carlisle | 18,682 | Cumberland | Borough |
| 18 | | West Chester | 18,461 | Chester | Borough |
| 19 | | Greensburg | 14,892 | Westmoreland | City |
| 20 | | Bloomsburg | 14,855 | Columbia | Town |
| 21 | | Pottsville | 14,324 | Schuylkill | City |
| 22 | | Indiana | 13,975 | Indiana | Borough |
| 23 | | Butler | 13,757 | Butler | City |
| 24 | | Washington | 13,663 | Washington | City |
| 25 | | Meadville | 13,388 | Crawford | City |
| 26 | | Uniontown | 10,372 | Fayette | City |
| 27 | | Sunbury | 9,905 | Northumberland | City |
| 28 | | Lock Haven | 9,772 | Clinton | City |
| 29 | | Warren | 9,710 | Warren | City |
| 30 | | Doylestown | 8,380 | Bucks | Borough |
| 31 | | Lewistown | 8,338 | Mifflin | Borough |
| 32 | | Gettysburg | 7,620 | Adams | Borough |
| 33 | | Huntingdon | 7,093 | Huntingdon | Borough |
| 34 | | Stroudsburg | 6,674 | Monroe | Borough |
| 35 | | Franklin | 6,545 | Venango | City |
| 36 | | Somerset | 6,277 | Somerset | Borough |
| 37 | | Clearfield | 6,215 | Clearfield | Borough |
| 38 | | Bellefonte | 6,187 | Centre | Borough |
| 39 | | Lewisburg | 5,792 | Union | Borough |
| 40 | | Hollidaysburg | 5,791 | Blair | Borough |
| 41 | | Media | 5,327 | Delaware | Borough |
| 42 | | Clarion | 5,276 | Clarion | Borough |
| 43 | | Jim Thorpe | 4,781 | Carbon | Borough |
| 44 | | Danville | 4,699 | Montour | Borough |
| 45 | | Beaver | 4,531 | Beaver | Borough |
| 46 | | Honesdale | 4,480 | Wayne | Borough |
| 47 | | Waynesburg | 4,176 | Greene | Borough |
| 48 | | Ridgway | 4,078 | Elk | Borough |
| 49 | | Kittanning | 4,044 | Armstrong | Borough |
| 50 | | Brookville | 3,924 | Jefferson | Borough |
| 51 | | Ebensburg | 3,351 | Cambria | Borough |
| 52 | | Wellsboro | 3,263 | Tioga | Borough |
| 53 | | Towanda | 2,919 | Bradford | Borough |
| 54 | | Bedford | 2,841 | Bedford | Borough |
| 55 | | Coudersport | 2,546 | Potter | Borough |
| 56 | | Emporium | 2,073 | Cameron | Borough |
| 57 | | Mercer | 2,002 | Mercer | Borough |
| 58 | | Tunkhannock | 1,836 | Wyoming | Borough |
| 59 | | Smethport | 1,655 | McKean | Borough |
| 60 | | Montrose | 1,617 | Susquehanna | Borough |
| 61 | | Middleburg | 1,309 | Snyder | Borough |
| 62 | | New Bloomfield | 1,247 | Perry | Borough |
| 63 | | McConnellsburg | 1,220 | Fulton | Borough |
| 64 | | Milford | 1,021 | Pike | Borough |
| 65 | | Mifflintown | 936 | Juniata | Borough |
| 66 | | Tionesta | 483 | Forest | Borough |
| 67 | | Laporte | 316 | Sullivan | Borough |

== See also ==
- List of municipalities in Pennsylvania
