= Smethport Area School District =

School district in Pennsylvania

Coordinates: 41.80399°N 78.44319°W

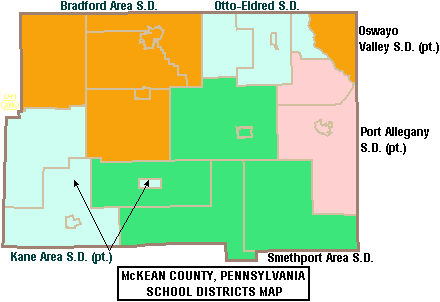

Address
- 414 South Mechanic Street Smethport, McKean County, Pennsylvania, 16749-1522; United States

District information
- Type: public school district

Other information
- Website: https://www.smethportschools.com/

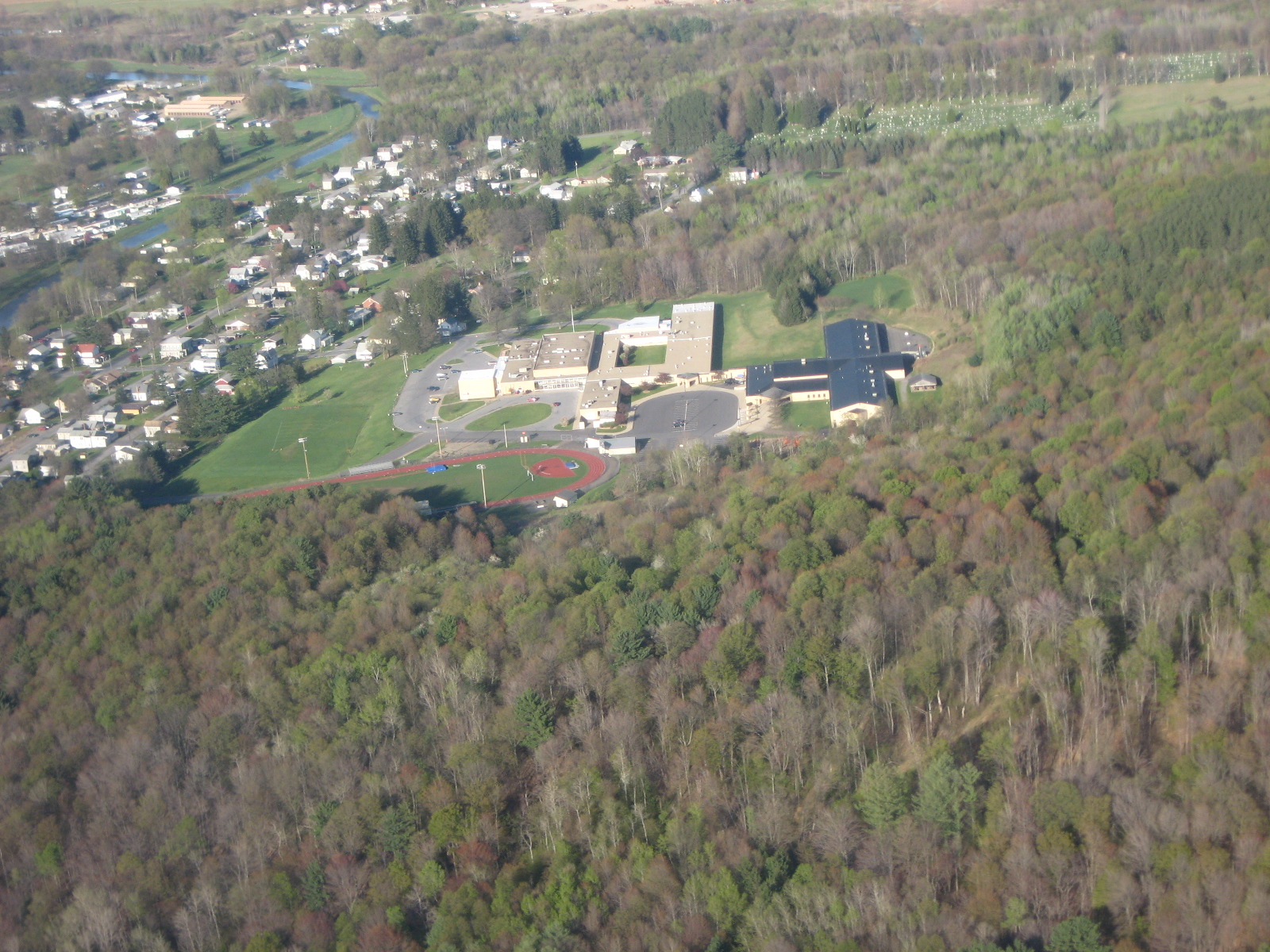
A Bird's eye view of Smethport Area Schools. The high school is on the left. The elementary school is on the right.

Smethport Area School District is a rural, public school district located in McKean County, Pennsylvania, United States. Situated in the north central part of the state, it overlooks the borough of Smethport, which serves as the county seat.

The District encompasses approximately 334 square miles (870 km^{2}). Smethport Area School District serves the residents of: Hamlin Township, Keating Township, Norwich Township and Sergeant Township. According to 2000 federal census data, it serves a resident population of 6,399. By 2010, the district's population declined to 6,121 people. In 2009, the district residents’ per capita income was $15,819, while the median family income was $39,809. In the Commonwealth, the median family income was $49,501 and the United States median family income was $49,445, in 2010. Smethport Area School District has its entire complex in the borough of Smethport. Smethport Area School District operates one elementary school for grades K–6. It is connected by tunnel to the Smethport Area Junior Senior High School, which houses grades 7–12. The superintendent's offices are in the elementary school.

== District athletics and activities ==
The district offers a variety of clubs, activities and an extensive sports program.

The school mascot is a wagon wheel, and they go by the name of "The Hubbers." The word "hubber" is symbolic of a wheel's hub—or center. The reason this is their name is because Smethport is the county seat—or the "hub" (center) of McKean County.

Students may participate in band, choir, National Honor Society, peer helpers, color guard, DECA, and student council.

=== Sports ===
The District funds:

==== High School ====
===== Boys =====
- Baseball – A
- Basketball – A
- Cross Country – A
- Football – A
- Golf – AA
- Soccer – A
- Track and Field – AA
- Wrestling – AA

===== Girls =====
- Basketball – A
- Cross Country – A
- Golf – AA
- Soccer (Fall) – A
- Softball – A
- Track and Field – AA
- Volleyball – A

==== Junior High School Sports ====
===== Boys =====
- Baseball
- Basketball
- Cross Country
- Football
- Golf
- Soccer
- Track and Field
- Wrestling

===== Girls =====
- Basketball
- Cheerleading
- Cross Country
- Golf
- Soccer
- Softball
- Track and Field
- Volleyball

According to PIAA directory, July 2012.
