= Crook Farm =

- U.S. National Register of Historic Places
- U.S. Historic district
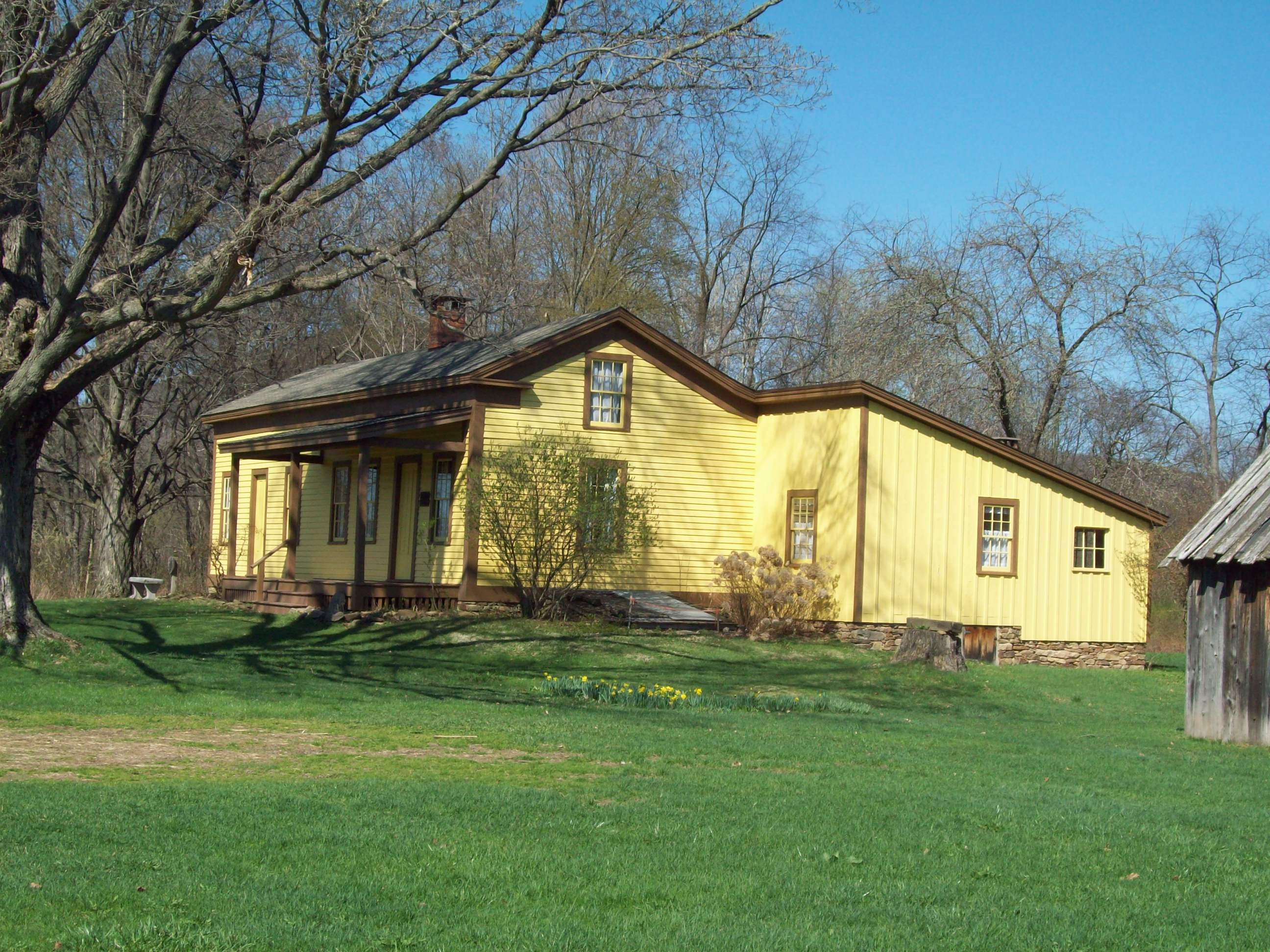
- Crook Farmhouse, April 2010

- Location within Pennsylvania
- Location: 476 Seaward Avenue; Foster Township, Pennsylvania
- Nearest city: Bradford, Pennsylvania
- Coordinates: 41°59′30″N 78°37′44″W
- Built: 1856
- Architectural style: Colonial Revival
- NRHP reference No.: 76002157
- Added to NRHP: March 26, 1976

The Crook Farm is an historic district in Foster Township near Bradford, McKean County, Pennsylvania, United States. It includes the Crook Farmhouse, constructed originally in 1856 and believed to be the oldest such structure in the area. It also includes the Olmstead Well Site, the first large producer of oil from the Bradford Oil Field.

It was listed on the National Register of Historic Places on March 26, 1976.

== See also ==
- National Register of Historic Places listings in McKean County, Pennsylvania
