= Burning Well, Pennsylvania =

Unincorporated community in Pennsylvania, US

- Unincorporated community
- Location within Pennsylvania Location within the United States
- Coordinates: 41°38′30″N 78°40′48″W
- Country: United States
- State: Pennsylvania
- County: McKean
- Township: Sergeant
- Elevation: 1,644 ft (501 m)
- Time zone: UTC-5 (Eastern (EST))
  - Summer (DST): UTC-4 (EDT)
- GNIS feature ID: 1209461

Burning Well is a village in Sergeant Township, McKean County, Pennsylvania, United States. Like Paradise, Pennsylvania, it attracts people because of its name. It is named after a local oil field.
