= Foster Township, McKean County, Pennsylvania =

Township in Pennsylvania, United States

Coordinates: 41°57′00″N 78°36′59″W

- Township
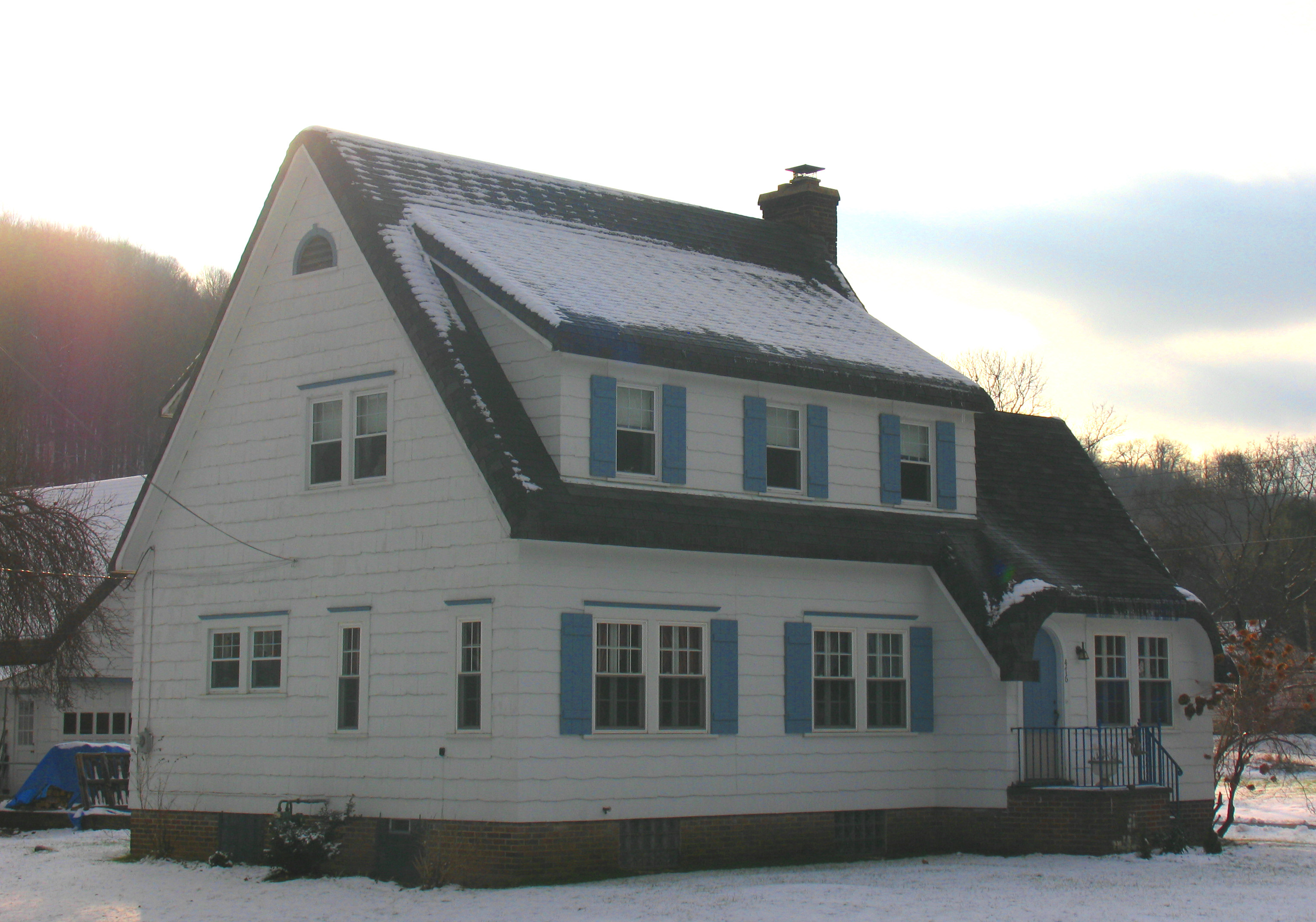
- A home on Derrick Road in Derrick City in Foster Township

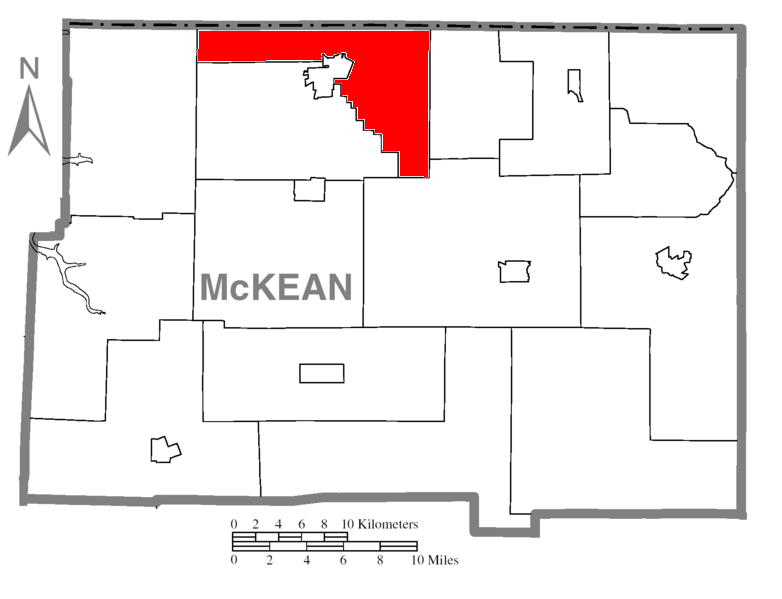
- Location in McKean County

- Location of McKean County in Pennsylvania
- Country: United States
- State: Pennsylvania
- County: McKean
- Settled: 1793
- Incorporated: 1880

Area
  - Total: 46.22 sq mi (119.7 km^{2})
  - Land: 46.17 sq mi (119.6 km^{2})
  - Water: 0.06 sq mi (0.16 km^{2})

Population (2020)
  - Total: 4,038 ▼
  - Estimate (2022): 3,947
  - Density: 85.4/sq mi (33.0/km^{2})
- Time zone: UTC-5 (Eastern (EST))
  - Summer (DST): UTC-4 (EDT)
- ZIP Codes: 16701 (Bradford); 16727 (Derrick City); 16744 (Rew); 16749 (Smethport)
- Area code: 814
- FIPS code: 42-083-26936
- Website: fostertownship.jimdofree.com

Foster Township is a township in McKean County, Pennsylvania, United States. The population was 4,038 at the 2020 census.

== History ==
The Crook Farm was listed on the National Register of Historic Places in 1976.

== Geography ==
The township is in northern McKean County and is bordered to the north by the state of New York. It sits on the north side of the city of Bradford. The hamlets of Foster Brook, Derrick City, and Rew are within the township.

According to the U.S. Census Bureau, Foster Township has a total area of 46.22 square miles (119.71 km^{2}), of which 46.17 square miles (119.58 km^{2}) are land and 0.06 square miles (0.16 km^{2}), or 0.12%, are water. Tunungwant Creek, a tributary of the Allegheny River, runs south-to-north across the center of the township.

== Demographics ==
Historical population
Census	Pop.	Note	%±
2000	4,566		—
2010	4,316		−5.5%
2020	4,038		−6.4%
2022 (est.)	3,947		−2.3%
U.S. Decennial Census

As of the census of 2010, there were 4,316 people, 1,829 households, and 1,305 families residing in the township. The population density was 98.4 inhabitants per square mile (38.0/km^{2}). There were 1,963 housing units at an average density of 41.9 per square mile (16.2/km^{2}). The racial makeup of the township was 98.51% White, 0.20% African American, 0.33% Native American, 0.48% Asian, 0.13% from other races, and 0.35% from two or more races. Hispanic or Latino of any race were 0.31% of the population.

There were 1,829 households, out of which 31.9% had children under the age of 18 living with them, 59.5% were married couples living together, 8.0% had a female householder with no husband present, and 28.6% were non-families. 23.8% of all households were made up of individuals, and 12.7% had someone living alone who was 65 years of age or older. The average household size was 2.48 and the average family size was 2.94. The median home cost in Foster township is $82,300.

In the township the population was spread out, with 24.7% under the age of 18, 6.1% from 18 to 24, 28.9% from 25 to 44, 23.1% from 45 to 64, and 17.2% who were 65 years of age or older. The median age was 40 years. For every 100 females, there were 96.0 males. For every 100 females age 18 and over, there were 92.8 males.

The median income for a household in the township was $40,341, and the median income for a family was $45,652. Males had a median income of $31,573 versus $22,428 for females. The per capita income for the township was $17,809. About 6.9% of families and 10.4% of the population were below the poverty line, including 15.1% of those under age 18 and 8.8% of those age 65 or over. Compared to the rest of the country, Foster township's cost of living is 13.30% Lower than the U.S. average. The unemployment rate in Foster township is 8.80 percent.
