= Blacksmith Run =

Stream in McKean County, Pennsylvania, U.S.

Coordinates: 41°48′24″N 78°27′13″W

Blacksmith Run is a stream in McKean County, Pennsylvania, in the United States. It is located outside of Smethport.

== History ==
Blacksmith Run was named for the fact an early blacksmith had a shop there.

In 1995, a bridge was built over Blacksmith Run. In 2018, a second bridge was built that is owned and maintained by the State Highway Agency.

== See also ==
- List of rivers of Pennsylvania
