= Otto-Eldred School District =

School district in Pennsylvania

Coordinates: 41.94363°N 78.40697°W

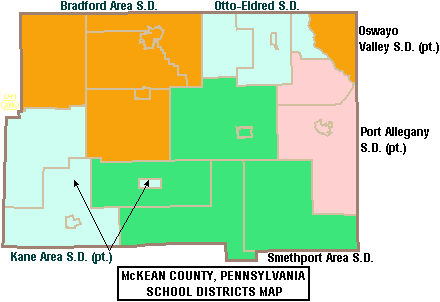

Address
- 143 Sweitzer Drive Duke Center, McKean County, Pennsylvania, 16729; United States

District information
- Type: Public

Other information
- Website: www.ottoeldred.org

The Otto-Eldred School District is a diminutive, rural, public school district located in McKean County, Pennsylvania. The school district is named after three of the four municipalities it serves: Eldred, Eldred Township, and Otto Township. A portion of Ceres Township is also within the district's taxation and attendance boundaries. Otto-Eldred School District encompasses approximately 86 square miles (220 km^{2}). According to 2000 federal census data, it serves a resident population of 4,493, while in 2010 the population had declined to 4,172 people. In 2009, Otto-Eldred School District residents' per capita income was $15,580, while the median family income was $38,393. In a hearing before the Pennsylvania House Appropriations Committee in 2009, then Superintendent Falk, reported that Otto-Eldred School District was the poorest in the Commonwealth.

Otto-Eldred School District operates two schools: Otto-Eldred Elementary School and Otto-Eldred Junior Senior High School.

== Extracurriculars ==
The district offers a variety of clubs, activities and an extensive sports program.

=== Sports ===
The district funds:

Boys

- Baseball - A
- Basketball- A
- Cross country - A
- Football - A
- Golf - AA
- Track and field - AA

Girls

- Basketball - A
- Cross country - A
- Golf - AA
- Softball - A
- Track and field - AA
- Volleyball

Junior high school sports

Boys

- Baseball
- Basketball
- Cross country
- Football
- Track and field

Girls

- Basketball
- Cross country
- Track and field
- Volleyball

According to PIAA directory July 2012
