= Gifford, Pennsylvania =

Unincorporated community in Pennsylvania, US

- Unincorporated community
- Location within Pennsylvania Location within the United States
- Coordinates: 41°51′30″N 78°35′47″W
- Country: United States
- State: Pennsylvania
- County: McKean
- Township: Keating
- Elevation: 2,221 ft (677 m)
- Time zone: UTC-5 (Eastern (EST))
  - Summer (DST): UTC-4 (EDT)
- GNIS feature ID: 1175596

Gifford is an unincorporated community in McKean County, Pennsylvania, United States. The ZIP code is 16732.

== Notable person ==
- Jim Owens, former Major League Baseball pitcher and long time pitching coach
