= Derrick City, Pennsylvania =

Unincorporated community in Pennsylvania, US

- Unincorporated community
- Location within Pennsylvania Location within the United States
- Coordinates: 41°58′14″N 78°34′17″W
- Country: United States
- State: Pennsylvania
- County: McKean
- Township: Foster
- Elevation: 1,562 ft (476 m)
- Time zone: UTC-5 (Eastern (EST))
  - Summer (DST): UTC-4 (EDT)
- ZIP code: 16727
- Area code: 814
- GNIS feature ID: 1173172

Derrick City is an unincorporated community in McKean County, Pennsylvania, United States. The community is located at the intersection of state routes 346 and 646, 4.1 miles (6.6 km) east-northeast of Bradford. Derrick City has a post office with ZIP code 16727.
