= Cyclone, Pennsylvania =

Unincorporated community in Pennsylvania, US

- Unincorporated community
- Location within Pennsylvania Location within the United States
- Coordinates: 41°49′56″N 78°35′9″W
- Country: United States
- State: Pennsylvania
- County: McKean
- Township: Keating
- Elevation: 2,198 ft (670 m)
- Time zone: UTC-5 (Eastern (EST))
  - Summer (DST): UTC-4 (EDT)
- ZIP code: 16726
- Area code: 814
- GNIS feature ID: 1172875

Cyclone is an unincorporated community in McKean County, Pennsylvania, United States.

The community was so named on account of a cyclone (tornado) which struck the area.
