= Potato Creek (Pennsylvania) =

River in the United States

Coordinates: 41°53′24″N 78°22′37″W

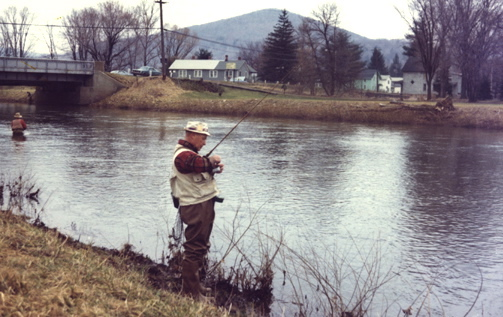
Trout fishing on Potato Creek, Smethport, PA

Potato Creek is a tributary of the Allegheny River that is located in McKean County, Pennsylvania in the United States.

== History ==
According to local history, Potato Creek was named from an incident when a group of Native Americans lost a supply of potatoes when their canoe capsized in the creek.

== Geography ==
Potato Creek joins the Allegheny River approximately 1.7 miles (2.7 km) downstream of the community of Coryville.

Potato Creek has many small tributaries, including Marvin Creek, which joins it in Smethport, and Cole Creek. Many smaller brooks and runs are also in this watershed.

At Smethport, the creek has a mean annual discharge of 308 cubic feet per second (8.7 cubic metres per second).

== See also ==
- List of rivers of Pennsylvania
- List of tributaries of the Allegheny River
