= Kinzua Bridge State Park =

State park in Pennsylvania, United States

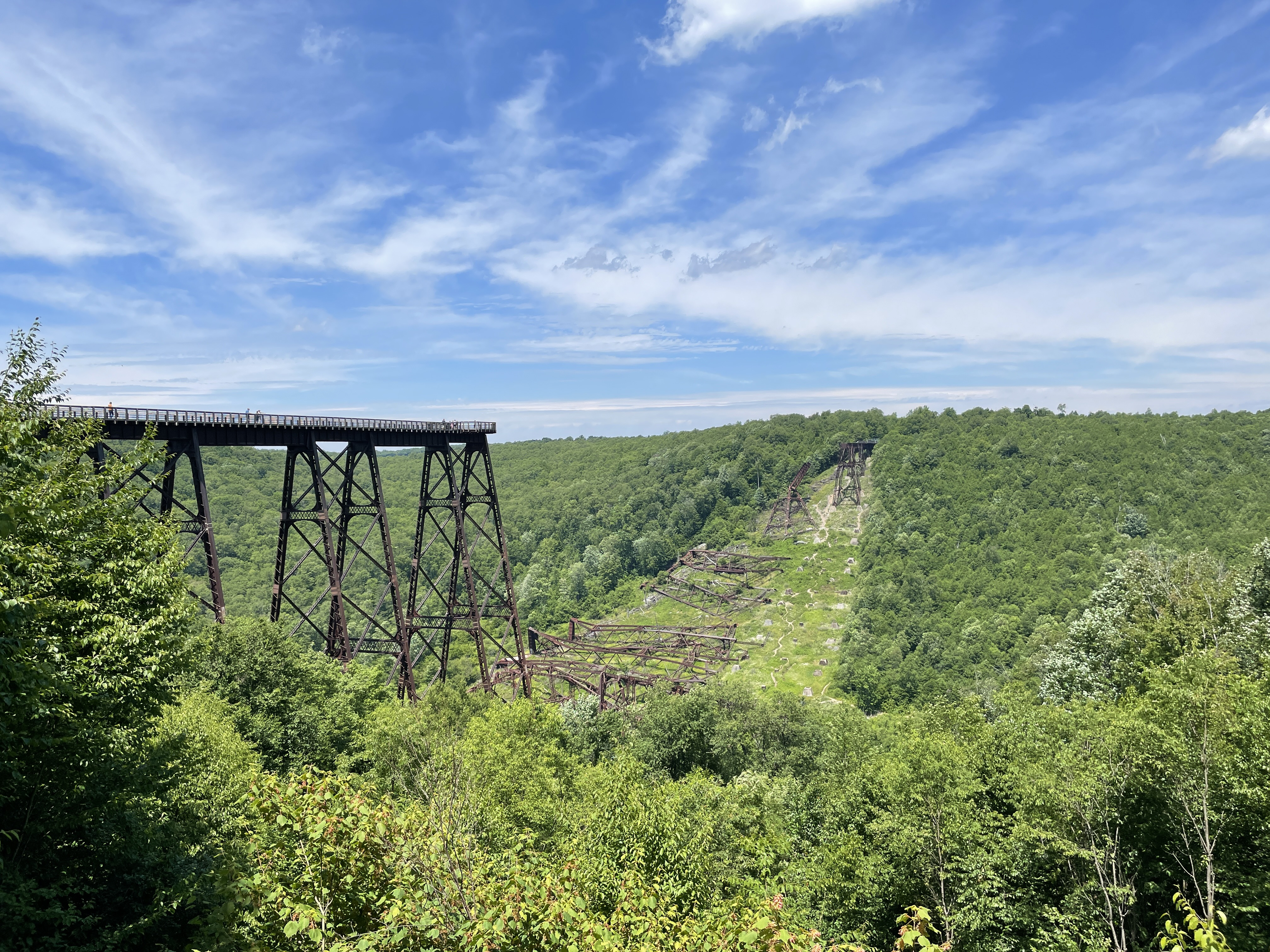

- Location within Pennsylvania Location within the United States
- Interactive map of Kinzua Bridge State Park
- Location: McKean County, Pennsylvania, United States
- Coordinates: 41°45′34″N 78°35′13″W
- Area: 339 acres (137 ha)
- Elevation: 2,136 feet (651 m)
- Established: 1963
- Administrator: Pennsylvania Department of Conservation and Natural Resources
- Website: Official website
- Pennsylvania State Parks

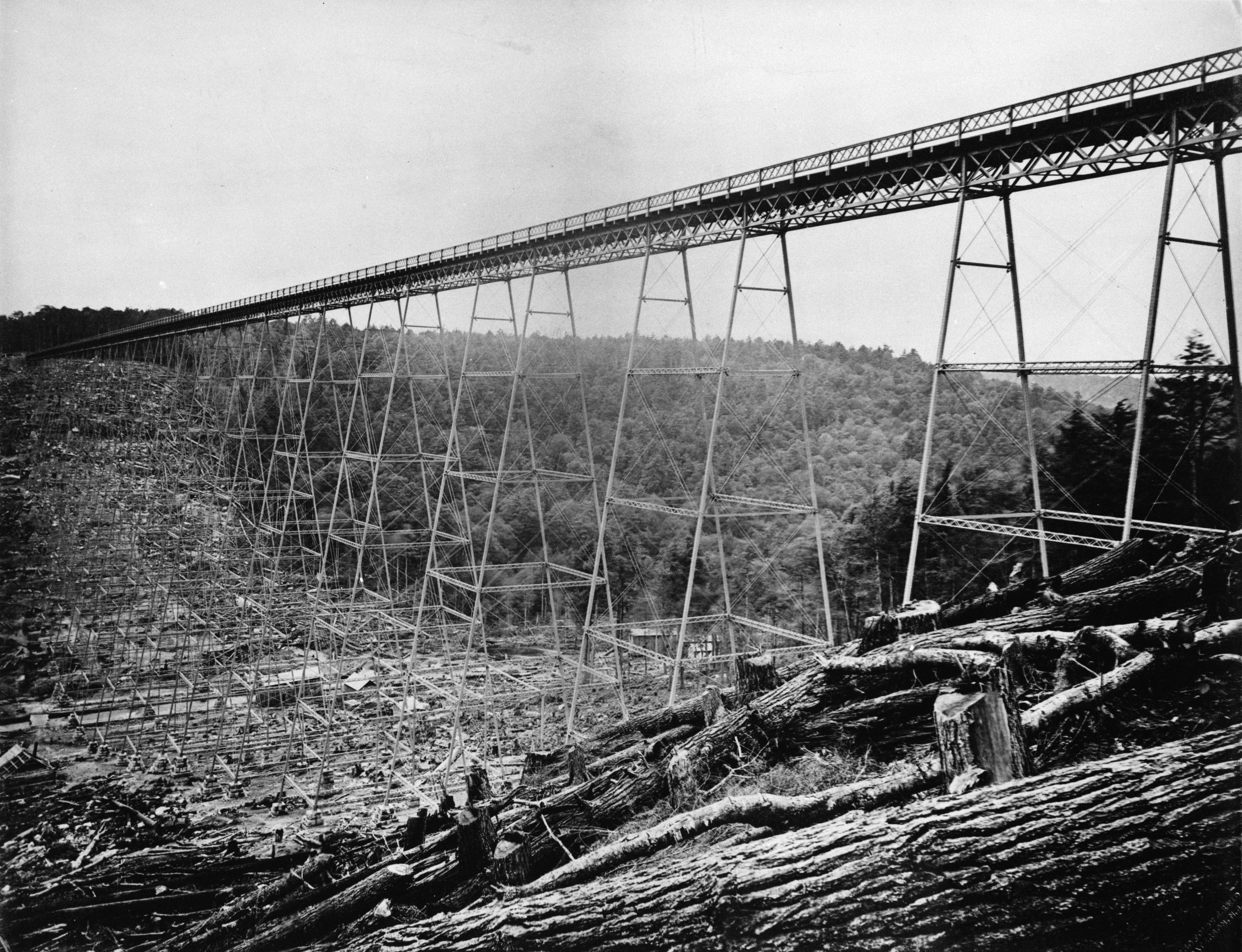
The original Kinzua bridge, c. 1900

Kinzua Bridge State Park is a 339-acre (137 ha) Pennsylvania state park near Mount Jewett, in Hamlin and Keating Townships, McKean County, Pennsylvania in the United States. The park lies between U.S. Route 6 and Pennsylvania Route 59, along State Route 3011 just east of the Allegheny National Forest.

Kinzua Bridge State Park was chosen by the Pennsylvania Department of Conservation and Natural Resources (DCNR) and its Bureau of Parks as one of "25 Must-See Pennsylvania State Parks".

The Kinzua Bridge Foundation, Inc. was formally incorporated in the State of Pennsylvania on November 1, 1993. It is a non-profit 501(c)3 which is a separate entity from the State Park. The Foundation is dedicated to the restoration and preservation of the Kinzua Bridge, the promotion of its historical and cultural significance, as well as the further development of the adjoining State Park.

== Kinzua Bridge ==
The park is noted as the site of the Kinzua Bridge spanning Kinzua Creek. The original bridge was built in 1882, and the current bridge was built in 1900 and destroyed in 2003 by a tornado. At the time it was built, the original (c. 1882) Kinzua Bridge was the highest, at 301 feet (92 m), railway bridge in the world, given the distinction of being listed as a Historic Civil Engineering Landmark (the listing was in 1977). The Erie Railroad company originally owned and operated the bridge.

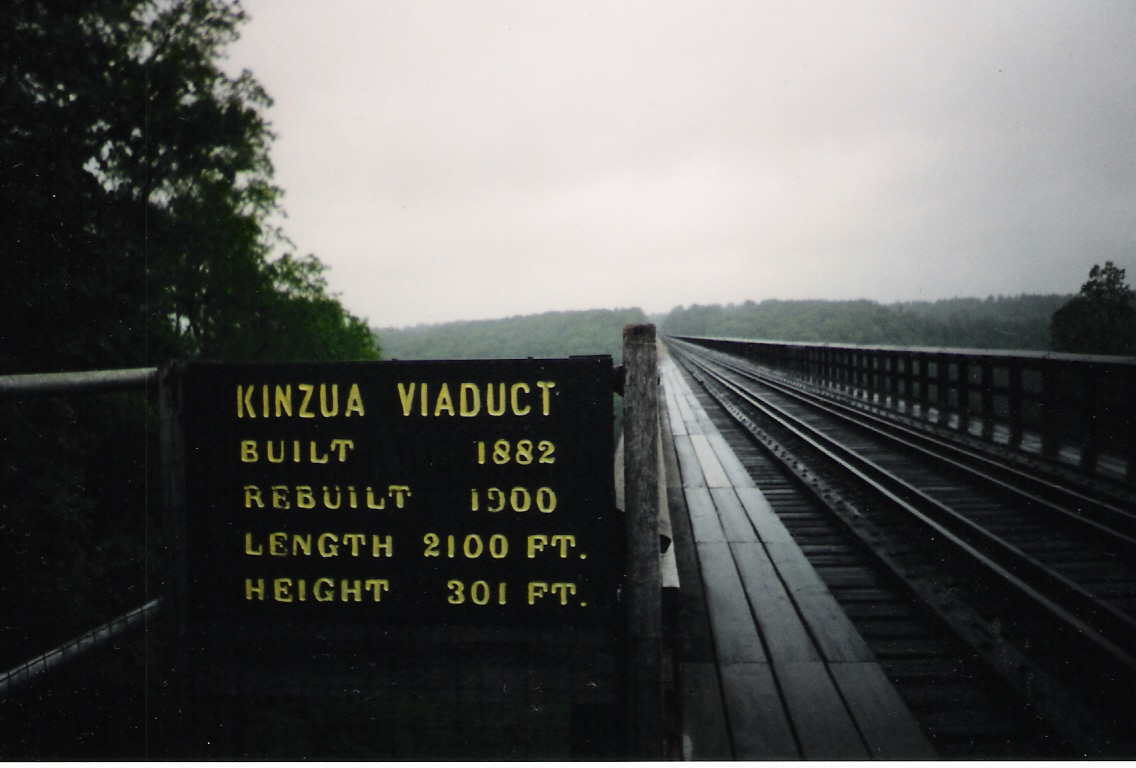
The Kinzua Bridge, in 2001, prior to its collapse.

William Scranton, then governor of Pennsylvania, signed legislation creating Kinzua Bridge State Park in 1963, although the park did not officially open until 1970. In 1987, excursion trains of the Knox and Kane Railroad again began running on the bridge. The trains traveled from Kane with a trip through the Allegheny National Forest and made a stop on the bridge before returning to Kane.

The Knox and Kane Railroad offered excursion rail trips across the bridge until June, 2002, when it was closed for restoration. At approximately 3:20 p.m., July 21, 2003, a tornado from the east touched down at the park. The storm, classified as F-1 on the Fujita scale, tore down 11 of the 20 structure spans and nearby trees were snapped and uprooted. The failure was caused by badly rusted bolts holding the bases of the towers. The investigation reckoned that the whole structure oscillated laterally 4-5 times before fatigue broke the base bolts. The towers fell intact in sections, and they suffered impact damage with the ground. They have been left as they fell, and it is intended to make the ruins a visitor attraction to show the forces of nature at work.

In 2011, the bridge was reinvented as the Kinzua Bridge Skywalk, a new pedestrian walkway where visitors can stroll 600 feet out on the remaining support towers, peer miles out into the Kinzua Gorge as well as peer down into the partial glass platform at the end of the walkway.

== Recreation ==
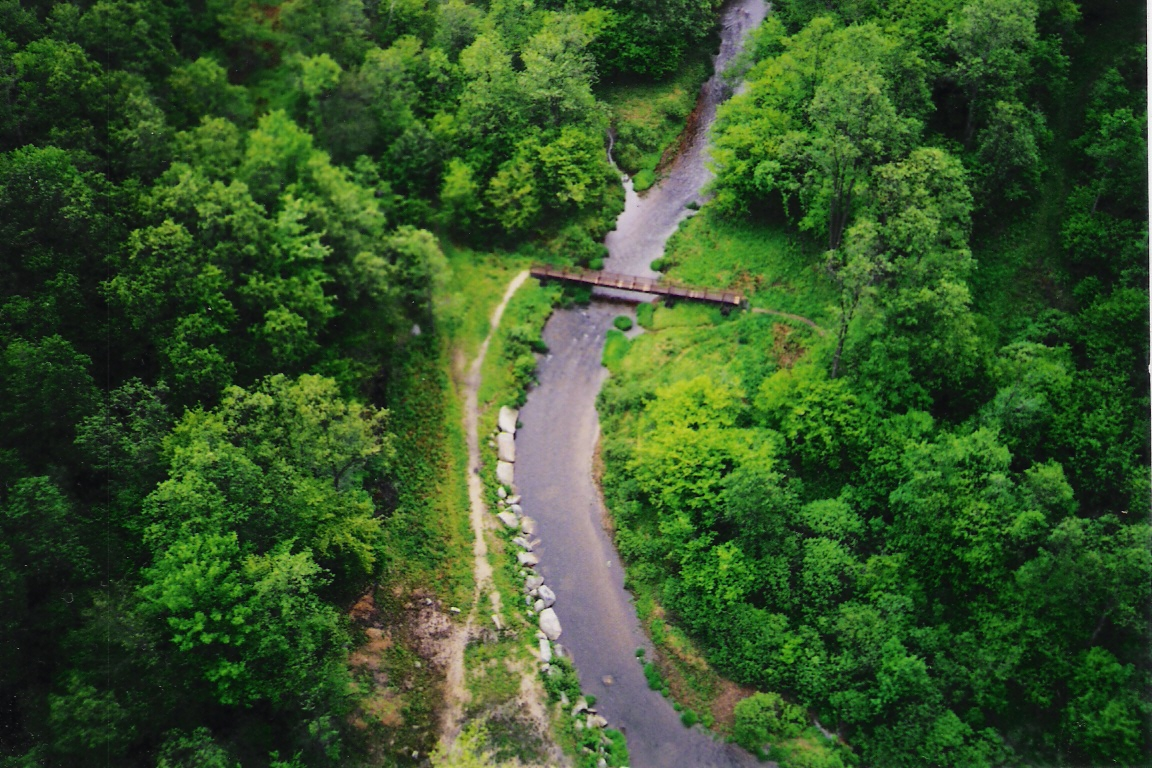
Kinzua Creek as seen from the bridge, Spring 2001.

A scenic view overlooks the fallen bridge and Kinzua Creek Valley. The overlook is also a prime location to view the fall foliage during the first two weeks of October. The park also has a shaded picnic area with a centrally located modern restroom.

There are 100 acres (40 ha) of woods open to hunting at Kinzua Bridge State Park. Hunters are expected to follow the rules and regulations of the Pennsylvania Game Commission. The common game species are black bears, eastern gray squirrel, white-tailed deer, and wild turkey. The hunting of groundhogs is prohibited.
