= Coryville, Pennsylvania =

Unincorporated village in Pennsylvania, US

Coordinates: 41°52′57″N 78°23′54″W

Coryville (also known as Frisbee) is an unincorporated village in McKean County, Pennsylvania, United States. It is along Pennsylvania Route 446 between the boroughs of Smethport and Eldred, on the border of Keating and Eldred townships. Coryville has a Baptist church and the Coryville Little League field.

== See also ==
Tide Water Pipe Company
