= Hamlin Township, McKean County, Pennsylvania =

Township in Pennsylvania, US

Coordinates: 41°43′00″N 78°34′59″W

Hamlin Township, Pennsylvania
- Township
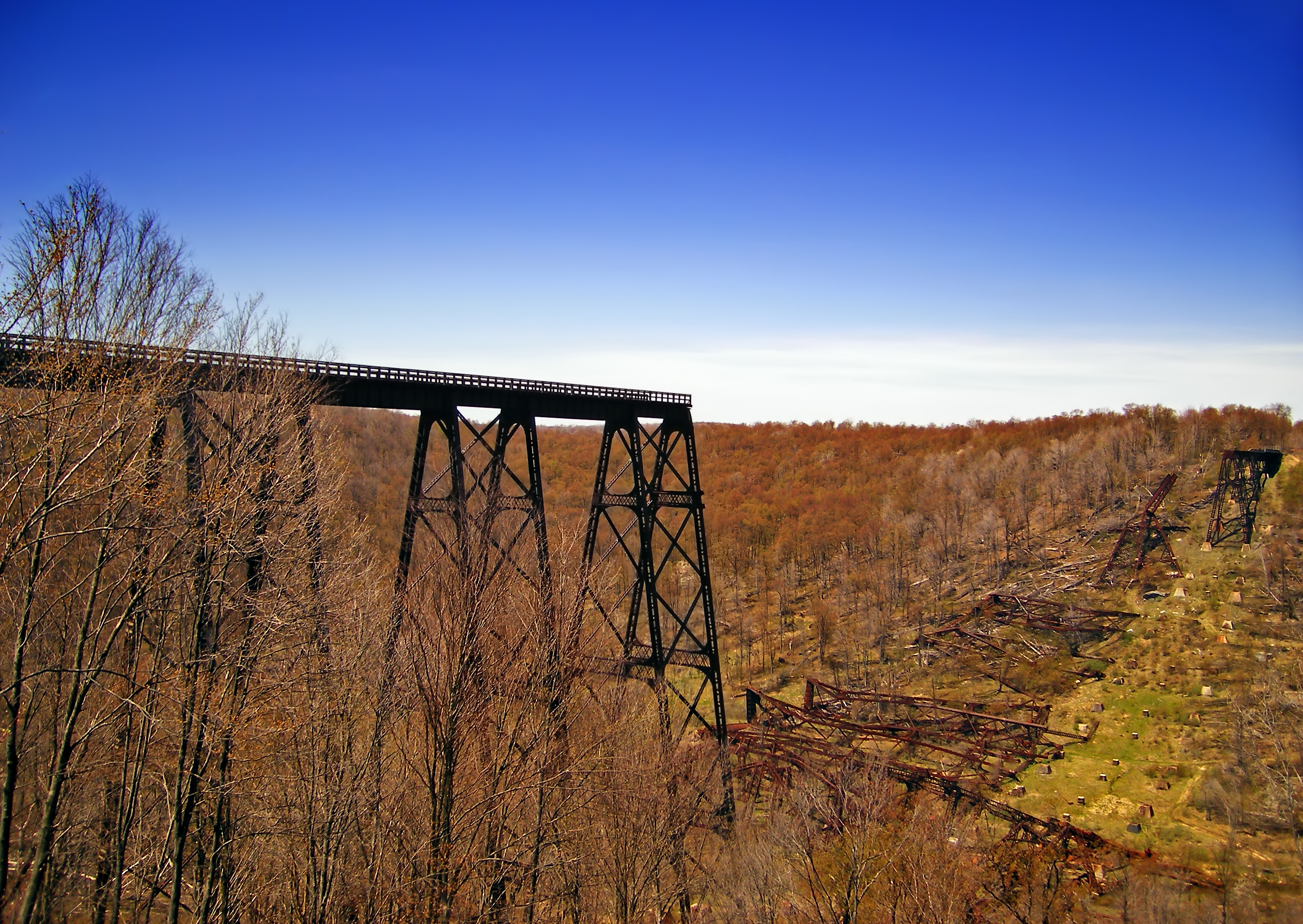
- The collapsed Kinzua Bridge at Kinzua Bridge State Park in Hamlin Township

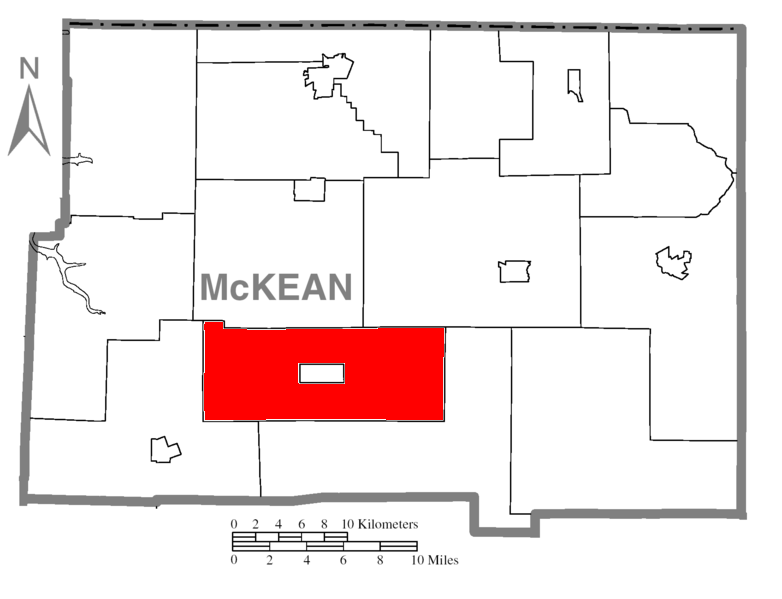
- Location in McKean County

- Location of McKean County in Pennsylvania
- Country: United States
- State: Pennsylvania
- County: McKean
- Settled: 1844
- Incorporated: 1844

Area
  - Total: 64.88 sq mi (168.0 km^{2})
  - Land: 64.81 sq mi (167.9 km^{2})
  - Water: 0.07 sq mi (0.18 km^{2})

Population (2020)
  - Total: 681 ▼
  - Estimate (2022): 670
  - Density: 10.34/sq mi (3.99/km^{2})
- Time zone: UTC-5 (Eastern (EST))
  - Summer (DST): UTC-4 (EDT)
- ZIP Codes: 16733 (Hazel Hurst); 16740 (Mount Jewett); 16735 (Kane); 16738 (Lewis Run); 16749 (Smethport)
- Area code: 814
- FIPS code: 42-083-32232
- Website: https://hamlintwp.com/

Hamlin Township is a township in McKean County, Pennsylvania, United States. The population was 681 at the 2020 census.

== Geography ==
The township is in south-central McKean County and surrounds the borough of Mount Jewett, a separate municipality. U.S. Route 6 crosses the township, passing through Mount Jewett and leading northeast to Smethport, the county seat, and southwest to Kane. U.S. Route 219 crosses the west side of the township, leading north to Bradford and south to Ridgway.

According to the U.S. Census Bureau, Hamlin Township has a total area of 64.9 square miles (168 km^{2}), of which 0.07 square miles (0.18 km^{2}), or 0.10%, are water. The northern part of the township is drained by Kinzua Creek, a west-flowing tributary of the Allegheny River. Kinzua Bridge State Park, the site of the former Kinzua railroad bridge, is in the northeast part of the township. The eastern portion of the township is drained by Marvin Creek, a northeast-flowing tributary of Potato Creek, which continues northeast to the Allegheny River. The western portion of the township is drained by tributaries of Kinzua Creek.

== Demographics ==
Historical population
Census	Pop.	Note	%±
2000	819		—
2010	734		−10.4%
2020	681		−7.2%
2022 (est.)	670		−1.6%
U.S. Decennial Census

As of the census of 2000, there were 819 people, 349 households, and 241 families residing in the township. The population density was 4.9 people/km^{2} (13 people/mi^{2}). There were 617 housing units at an average density of 3.7/km^{2} (9.6/mi^{2}). The racial makeup of the township was 99.63% White, 0.24% Asian, and 0.12% from two or more races. Hispanic or Latino of any race were 0.24% of the population.

There were 349 households, out of which 26.9% had children under the age of 18 living with them, 56.7% were married couples living together, 8.6% had a female householder with no husband present, and 30.9% were non-families. 26.1% of all households were made up of individuals, and 9.7% had someone living alone who was 65 years of age or older. The average household size was 2.35 and the average family size was 2.80.

In the township the population was spread out, with 80% under the age of 18, 6.7% from 18 to 24, 25.0% from 25 to 44, 31.1% from 45 to 64, and 15.1% who were 65 years of age or older. The median age was 43 years. For every 100 females, there were 105.3 males. For every 100 females age 18 and over, there were 100.3 males.

The median income for a household in the township was $34,219, and the median income for a family was $40,000. Males had a median income of $31,250 versus $21,328 for females. The per capita income for the township was $17,505. About 5.8% of families and 8.0% of the population were below the poverty line, including 8.5% of those under age 18 and 9.4% of those age 65 or over.
