= Otto Township, Pennsylvania =

Township in Pennsylvania, US

Coordinates: 41°57′00″N 78°27′59″W

- Township
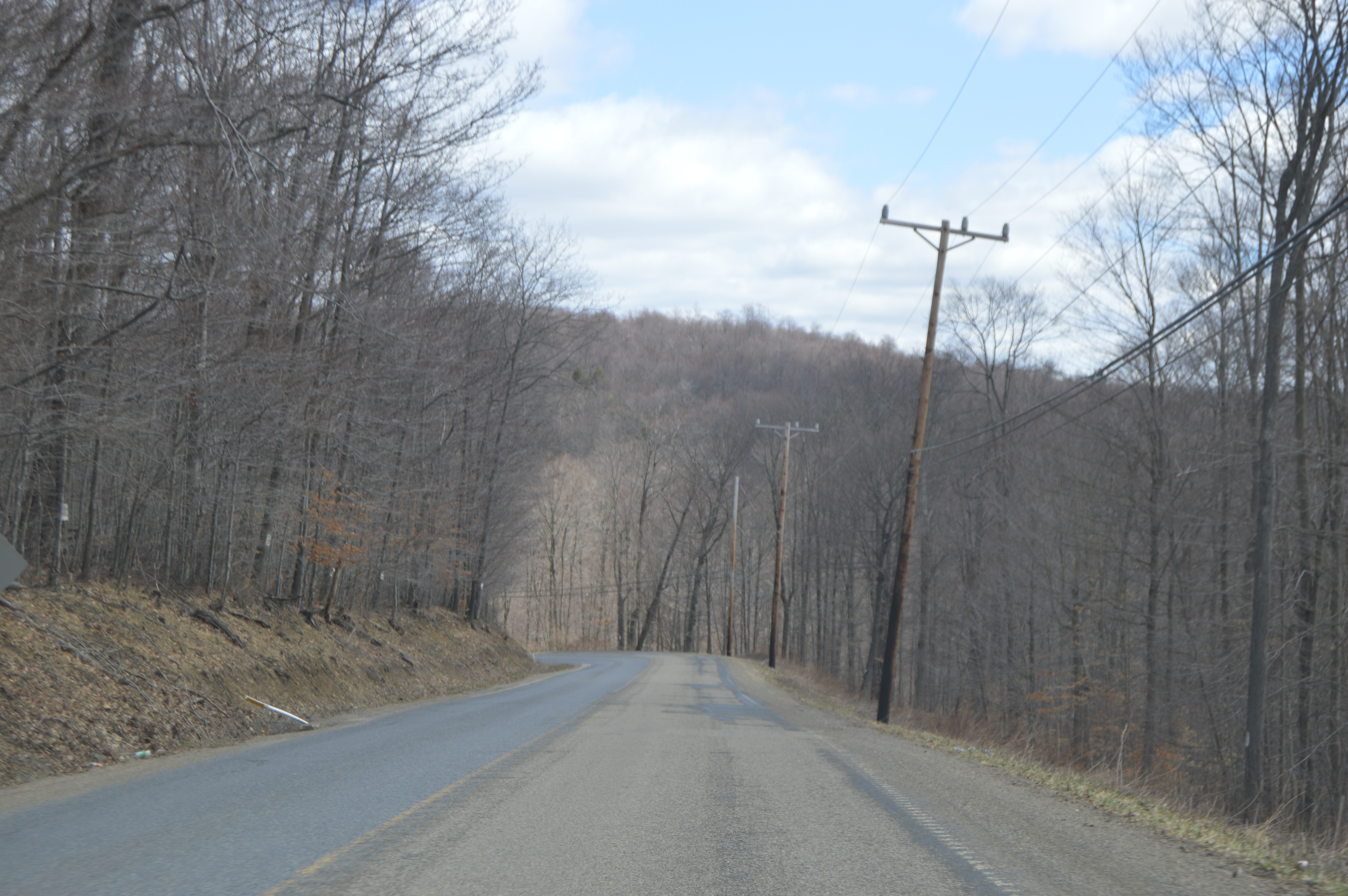
- Pennsylvania Route 46

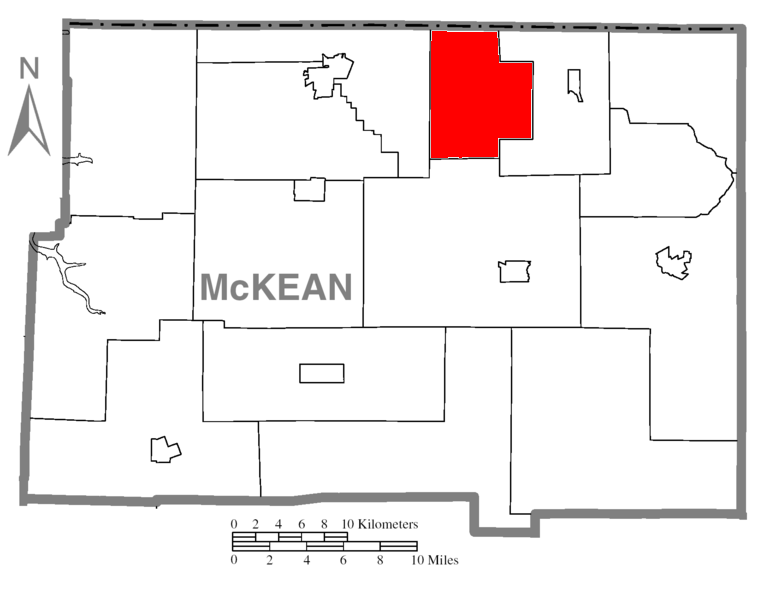
- Map of McKean County, Pennsylvania highlighting Otto Township

- Map of McKean County, Pennsylvania
- Country: United States
- State: Pennsylvania
- County: McKean
- Settled: 1842
- Incorporated: 1854

Area
  - Total: 34.43 sq mi (89.18 km^{2})
  - Land: 34.40 sq mi (89.09 km^{2})
  - Water: 0.035 sq mi (0.09 km^{2})

Population (2020)
  - Total: 1,518 ▼
  - Estimate (2022): 1,484
  - Density: 43.7/sq mi (16.89/km^{2})
- Time zone: UTC-5 (Eastern (EST))
  - Summer (DST): UTC-4 (EDT)
- Area code: 814
- FIPS code: 42-083-57312
- Website: https://ottotownship.net/

Otto Township is a township in McKean County, Pennsylvania, United States. The population was 1,518 at the time of the 2020 census.

== Geography ==
According to the United States Census Bureau, the township has a total area of 34.8 square miles (90.1 km^{2}), all land.

== Demographics ==
Historical population
Census	Pop.	Note	%±
2000	1,738		—
2010	1,556		−10.5%
2020	1,518		−2.4%
2022 (est.)	1,484		−2.2%
U.S. Decennial Census

As of the census of 2000, there were 1,738 people, 678 households, and 496 families residing in the township. The population density was 49.9 inhabitants per square mile (19.3/km^{2}). There were 742 housing units at an average density of 21.3/sq mi (8.2/km^{2}). The racial makeup of the township was 98.62% White, 0.29% African American, 0.40% Native American, 0.23% Asian, 0.06% from other races, and 0.40% from two or more races. Hispanic or Latino of any race were 0.23% of the population.

There were 678 households, out of which 32.6% had children under the age of 18 living with them, 58.7% were married couples living together, 9.4% had a female householder with no husband present, and 26.7% were non-families. 24.0% of all households were made up of individuals, and 10.0% had someone living alone who was 65 years of age or older. The average household size was 2.55 and the average family size was 3.00.

In the township the population was spread out, with 26.6% under the age of 18, 6.8% from 18 to 24, 27.0% from 25 to 44, 25.5% from 45 to 64, and 14.0% who were 65 years of age or older. The median age was 38 years. For every 100 females there were 92.9 males. For every 100 females age 18 and over, there were 92.6 males.

The median income for a household in the township was $32,037, and the median income for a family was $37,857. Males had a median income of $30,117 versus $23,667 for females. The per capita income for the township was $15,697. About 10.4% of families and 14.6% of the population were below the poverty line, including 25.3% of those under age 18 and 7.9% of those age 65 or over.

== Locations ==
There are three villages in Otto Township, which are signed as such. They are:

- Duke Center, the township's largest population center, located at the junction of Pennsylvania Routes 346 and 546
- Rixford, intermediate in size, located along Pennsylvania Route 246
- Prentisvale, the smallest, located near the junction of Pennsylvania Routes 246 and 346
