= Mount Jewett, Pennsylvania =

Borough in Pennsylvania, US

- Borough
- Birdseye view of Mt. Jewett

- Location in McKean County, Pennsylvania

- Location within Pennsylvania Location within the United States
- Coordinates: 41°43′29″N 78°38′37″W
- Country: United States
- State: Pennsylvania
- County: McKean
- Incorporated: 1893

Area
  - Total: 2.42 sq mi (6.28 km^{2})
  - Land: 2.41 sq mi (6.23 km^{2})
  - Water: 0.019 sq mi (0.05 km^{2})
- Elevation: 2,240 ft (680 m)

Population (2020)
  - Total: 858
  - Density: 356.7/sq mi (137.74/km^{2})
- Time zone: UTC-5 (Eastern (EST))
  - Summer (DST): UTC-4 (EDT)
- ZIP Codes: 16740 (Mount Jewett); 16735 (Kane)
- Area code: 814
- FIPS code: 42-51632
- Website: mtjewettpa.com

Mount Jewett is a borough in McKean County, Pennsylvania, United States. The population was 858 at the 2020 census. The current mayor is Kelly Barr Hughes. Mount Jewett is the closest borough to Kinzua Bridge State Park, which includes the Kinzua Bridge Sky Walk and Kinzua Viaduct.

== History ==
Mount Jewett is named for Hugh Judge Jewett, president of the New York, Lake Erie and Western Railroad when it brought rail service to the area. Previously it had been known as Howard Hill, after Howard, New York.

In February 2001 an explosion at the Temple Inland particle board plant in Mount Jewett killed three workers and injured at least five others.

== Geography ==
Mount Jewett is located in south-central McKean County at 41°43′29″N 78°38′37″W (41.724788, -78.643702). U.S. Route 6 passes through the borough as its Main Street, leading northeast 14 miles (23 km) to Smethport, the McKean county seat, and southwest 11 miles (18 km) to Kane. Bradford is 23 miles (37 km) to the north via US 6 and US 219.

According to the U.S. Census Bureau, the borough of Mount Jewett has a total area of 2.43 square miles (6.29 km^{2}), of which 0.02 square miles (0.05 km^{2}), or 0.82%, are water. The borough sits on a ridge which drains north toward Kinzua Creek, southwest toward the West Branch of the Clarion River, and southeast toward Marvin Creek. All three waterways are tributaries of the Allegheny River.

Mount Jewett is tied with Callimont for the title of being the fifth-highest, in elevation, of towns in Pennsylvania, at 2,240 feet (680 m).

=== Climate ===
The climatic region is typified by large seasonal temperature differences, with warm to hot (and often humid) summers and cold (sometimes severely cold) winters. According to the Köppen Climate Classification system, Mount Jewett has a humid continental climate, abbreviated "Dfb" on climate maps.

== Demographics ==
Historical population
Census	Pop.	Note	%±
1900	1,553		—
1910	1,771		14.0%
1920	1,494		−15.6%
1930	1,379		−7.7%
1940	1,445		4.8%
1950	1,415		−2.1%
1960	1,226		−13.4%
1970	1,060		−13.5%
1980	1,053		−0.7%
1990	1,029		−2.3%
2000	1,070		4.0%
2010	919		−14.1%
2020	858		−6.6%
2021 (est.)	837	▼	−2.4%

As of the census of 2000, there were 1,070 people, 444 households, and 305 families residing in the borough. The population density was 449.1 inhabitants per square mile (173.4/km^{2}). There were 504 housing units at an average density of 211.5 per square mile (81.7/km^{2}). The racial makeup of the borough was 99.53% White, 0.28% Native American, 0.09% Asian, and 0.09% from two or more races. Hispanic or Latino of any race were 0.19% of the population.

There were 444 households, out of which 34.7% had children under the age of 18 living with them, 50.7% were married couples living together, 12.8% had a female householder with no husband present, and 31.1% were non-families. 27.7% of all households were made up of individuals, and 12.6% had someone living alone who was 65 years of age or older. The average household size was 2.41 and the average family size was 2.90. In the borough the population was spread out, with 27.1% under the age of 18, 7.5% from 18 to 24, 30.2% from 25 to 44, 20.7% from 45 to 64, and 14.6% who were 65 years of age or older. The median age was 35 years. For every 100 females there were 95.6 males. For every 100 females age 18 and over, there were 90.7 males.

The median income for a household in the borough was $32,583, and the median income for a family was $40,147. Males had a median income of $30,189 versus $22,833 for females. The per capita income for the borough was $17,056. About 12.8% of families and 14.3% of the population were below the poverty line, including 20.5% of those under age 18 and 6.2% of those age 65 or over.

The population of Mount Jewett includes a significant number of people with Swedish ancestry. Every August the town celebrates this history with their well-known "Swedish Festival" The August 2010 celebration was the 40th annual Swedish Festival in Mount Jewett and the 2021 celebration was the 50th, after the 2020 event was cancelled due to the global COVID-19 pandemic.

== Kinzua Bridge ==
Kinzua Bridge State Park is located 4 miles (6 km) northeast of Mount Jewett. The bridge was used to carry trains across the valley of Kinzua Creek and overlooks the hamlet of Kushequa. Originally constructed in 1882, the structure was the highest iron bridge in the world. In 1900 it was turned into a steel structure. When the area became a state park, an independent company used the bridge to carry sightseers and tourists across the valley in an old steam locomotive. On July 21, 2003, a tornado destroyed a large portion of the bridge. Now all that remains is a portion of the bridge and a small section of railroad track at each end of the valley. In another devastating blow, on early Sunday March 16, 2008, the locomotives that had been used to carry sightseers across the bridge were severely damaged by a fire set by arsonists. The fire, which burned the Biddle Street building used to house the trains in Kane, Pennsylvania, caused $1 million in damage.

The state decided not to rebuild the Kinzua Bridge, which would have cost an estimated $45 million. Instead, the ruins were to become a visitor attraction used to show the forces of nature at work. Kinzua Bridge State Park had attracted 215,000 visitors annually before the bridge collapsed, and was one of twenty state parks chosen by the Pennsylvania Bureau of Parks for its list of "Twenty Must-See Pennsylvania State Parks". The viaduct and its collapse were featured in the History Channel's Life After People as an example of how corrosion and high winds would eventually lead to the collapse of any steel structure.

The Knox and Kane Railroad was forced to suspend operations in October 2004 after a 75 percent decline in the number of passengers, brought about by the collapse of the Kinzua Bridge. The Kovalchick Corporation bought the Knox and Kane's tracks and all other property owned by the railroad, including the locomotives and rolling stock. The Kovalchick Corporation also owns the East Broad Top Railroad and was the company that owned the Kinzua Bridge before selling it to the state in 1963.

Pennsylvania released $700,000 to design repairs on the remaining towers and plan development of new park facilities in June 2005. In late 2005, the Pennsylvania Department of Conservation and Natural Resources (DCNR) put forward an $8 million proposal for a new observation deck and visitors' center, with plans to allow access to the bridge and a hiking trail giving views of the fallen towers. The Kinzua Sky Walk was opened on September 15, 2011, in a ribbon-cutting ceremony. The Sky Walk consists of a pedestrian walkway to an observation deck with a glass floor at the end of the bridge that allows views of the bridge and the valley directly below. The walkway cost $4.3 million to construct, but is estimated to bring in $11.5 million in tourism revenue for the region.

== Education ==
The students of the borough attend school in the Kane Area School District, even though the borough is surrounded by Hamlin Township—belonging to neighboring Smethport Area School District.
