= Sergeant Township, Pennsylvania =

Township in Pennsylvania, US

Coordinates: 41°42′00″N 78°28′59″W

- Township
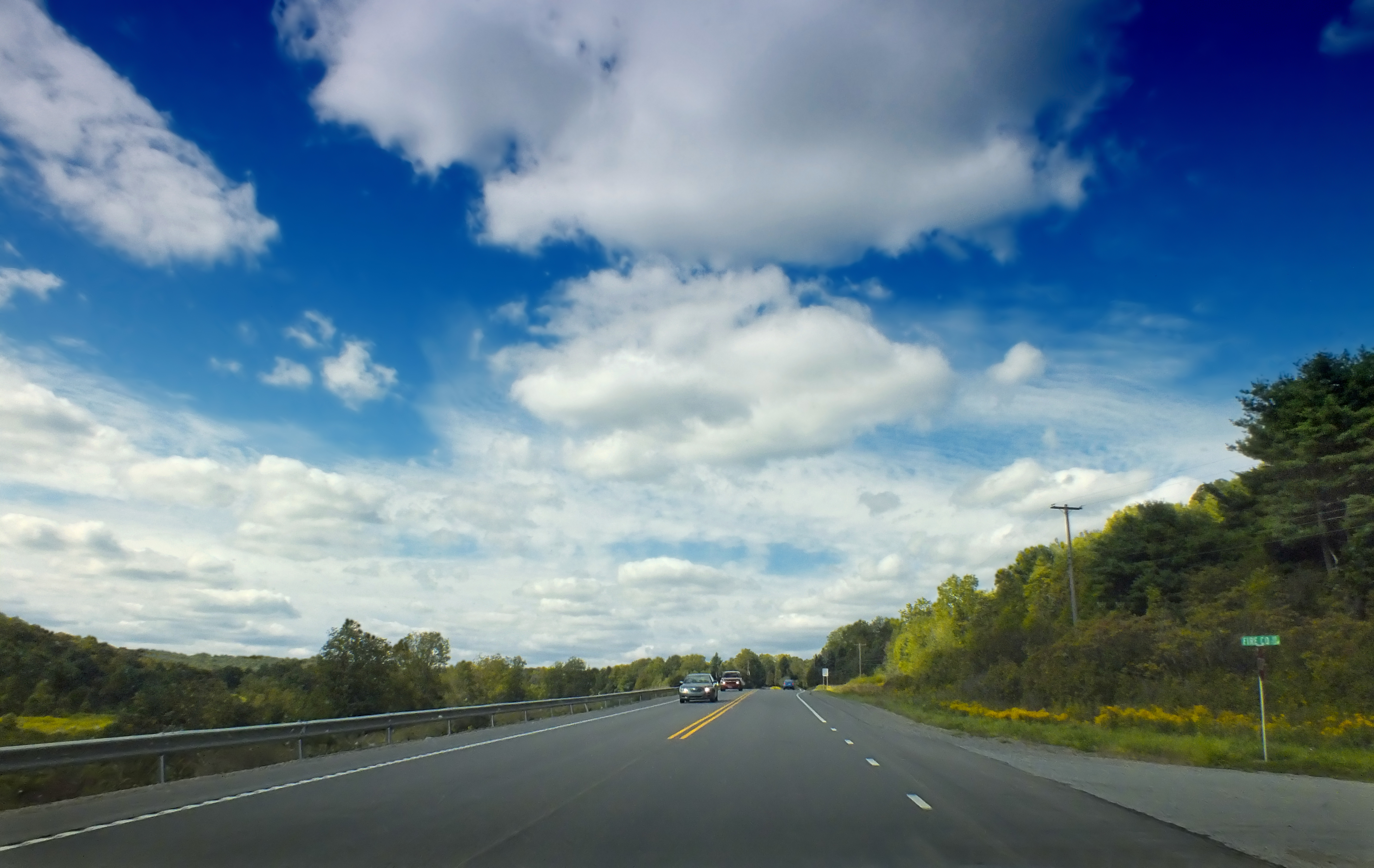
- U. S. Route 219 in the township

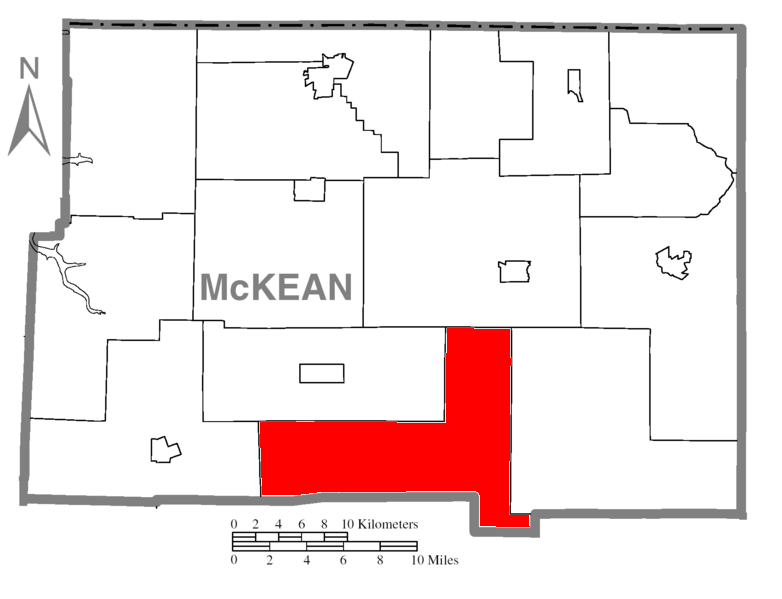
- Map of McKean County, Pennsylvania highlighting Sergeant Township

- Map of McKean County, Pennsylvania
- Country: United States
- State: Pennsylvania
- County: McKean
- Settled: 1809
- Incorporated: 1854

Area
  - Total: 80.18 sq mi (207.67 km^{2})
  - Land: 80.12 sq mi (207.50 km^{2})
  - Water: 0.066 sq mi (0.17 km^{2})

Population (2020)
  - Total: 147 ▲
  - Estimate (2022): 143
  - Density: 1.7/sq mi (0.65/km^{2})
- Time zone: UTC-5 (Eastern (EST))
  - Summer (DST): UTC-4 (EDT)
- Area code: 814
- FIPS code: 42-083-69304

Sergeant Township is a township in McKean County, Pennsylvania, United States. The population was 147 at the time of the 2020 census.

== Geography ==
According to the United States Census Bureau, the township has a total area of 80.3 square miles (208.0 km^{2}), of which 80.3 square miles (207.9 km^{2}) is land and 0.04 square mile (0.1 km^{2}) (0.05%) is water.

=== Climate ===
Clermont is a populated place within the Sergeant Township. Clermont has a humid continental climate (Köppen Dfb), with warm summers and cold, snowy winters.

Climate data for Clermont 1 NW, Pennsylvania, 1991–2020 normals: 2080ft (634m)
Month	Jan	Feb	Mar	Apr	May	Jun	Jul	Aug	Sep	Oct	Nov	Dec	Year
Record high °F (°C)	63 (17)	70 (21)	78 (26)	85 (29)	89 (32)	87 (31)	98 (37)	91 (33)	87 (31)	82 (28)	75 (24)	66 (19)	98 (37)
Mean maximum °F (°C)	53.0 (11.7)	52.8 (11.6)	63.6 (17.6)	77.8 (25.4)	83.1 (28.4)	84.4 (29.1)	85.8 (29.9)	83.7 (28.7)	81.0 (27.2)	75.2 (24.0)	66.3 (19.1)	53.2 (11.8)	86.1 (30.1)
Mean daily maximum °F (°C)	29.3 (−1.5)	32.0 (0.0)	41.2 (5.1)	55.1 (12.8)	66.1 (18.9)	73.0 (22.8)	76.4 (24.7)	74.4 (23.6)	66.8 (19.3)	56.6 (13.7)	44.1 (6.7)	33.6 (0.9)	54.1 (12.3)
Daily mean °F (°C)	21.3 (−5.9)	23.0 (−5.0)	31.0 (−0.6)	43.2 (6.2)	54.1 (12.3)	61.9 (16.6)	65.5 (18.6)	63.9 (17.7)	56.9 (13.8)	46.6 (8.1)	36.0 (2.2)	26.6 (−3.0)	44.2 (6.8)
Mean daily minimum °F (°C)	13.2 (−10.4)	14.0 (−10.0)	20.8 (−6.2)	31.3 (−0.4)	42.0 (5.6)	50.8 (10.4)	54.6 (12.6)	53.3 (11.8)	46.9 (8.3)	36.6 (2.6)	27.9 (−2.3)	19.6 (−6.9)	34.3 (1.3)
Mean minimum °F (°C)	−8.4 (−22.4)	−6.0 (−21.1)	0.4 (−17.6)	17.0 (−8.3)	27.2 (−2.7)	37.1 (2.8)	43.5 (6.4)	42.6 (5.9)	34.7 (1.5)	24.1 (−4.4)	13.0 (−10.6)	2.0 (−16.7)	−11.4 (−24.1)
Record low °F (°C)	−18 (−28)	−26 (−32)	−17 (−27)	10 (−12)	20 (−7)	31 (−1)	38 (3)	39 (4)	29 (−2)	17 (−8)	0 (−18)	−12 (−24)	−26 (−32)
Average precipitation inches (mm)	3.73 (95)	2.96 (75)	3.67 (93)	4.43 (113)	4.71 (120)	4.72 (120)	4.80 (122)	4.79 (122)	4.41 (112)	4.38 (111)	4.10 (104)	4.11 (104)	50.81 (1,291)
Average snowfall inches (cm)	18.40 (46.7)	19.10 (48.5)	10.80 (27.4)	4.00 (10.2)	0.40 (1.0)	0.00 (0.00)	0.00 (0.00)	0.00 (0.00)	0.00 (0.00)	1.50 (3.8)	7.10 (18.0)	18.20 (46.2)	79.5 (201.8)
Source 1: NOAA
Source 2: XMACIS (temp records & monthly max/mins)

== Demographics ==
Historical population
Census	Pop.	Note	%±
2000	176		—
2010	141		−19.9%
2020	147		4.3%
2022 (est.)	143		−2.7%
U.S. Decennial Census

As of the census of 2000, there were one hundred and seventy-six people, seventy-seven households and fifty-eight families residing in the township.

The population density was 2.2 people per square mile (0.8/km^{2}). There were three hundred and twenty-nine housing units at an average density of 4.1/sq mi (1.6/km^{2}).

The racial makeup of the township was 96.02% White, 0.57% African American, and 3.41% from two or more races. Hispanic or Latino of any race were 2.27% of the population.

There were seventy-seven households, out of which 24.7% had children under the age of eighteen living with them; 66.2% were married couples living together, 6.5% had a female householder with no husband present, and 23.4% were non-families. 22.1% of all households were made up of individuals, and 11.7% had someone living alone who was sixty-five years of age or older. The average household size was 2.29 and the average family size was 2.64.

In the township, the population was spread out, with 17.6% under the age of eighteen, 5.1% from eighteen to twenty-four, 22.7% from twenty-five to forty-four, 33.5% from forty-five to sixty-four, and 21.0% who were sixty-five years of age or older. The median age was forty-eight years.

For every one hundred females, there were 114.6 males. For every one hundred females aged eighteen and over, there were 113.2 males.

The median income for a household in the township was $33,438, and the median income for a family was $37,813. Males had a median income of $33,000 compared with $21,875 for females. The per capita income for the township was $16,063.

About 6.2% of families and 9.8% of the population were below the poverty line, including 8.5% of those under the age of 18 and 18.4% of those 65 or over.
