= Smethport, Pennsylvania =

Borough in Pennsylvania, US

- Borough
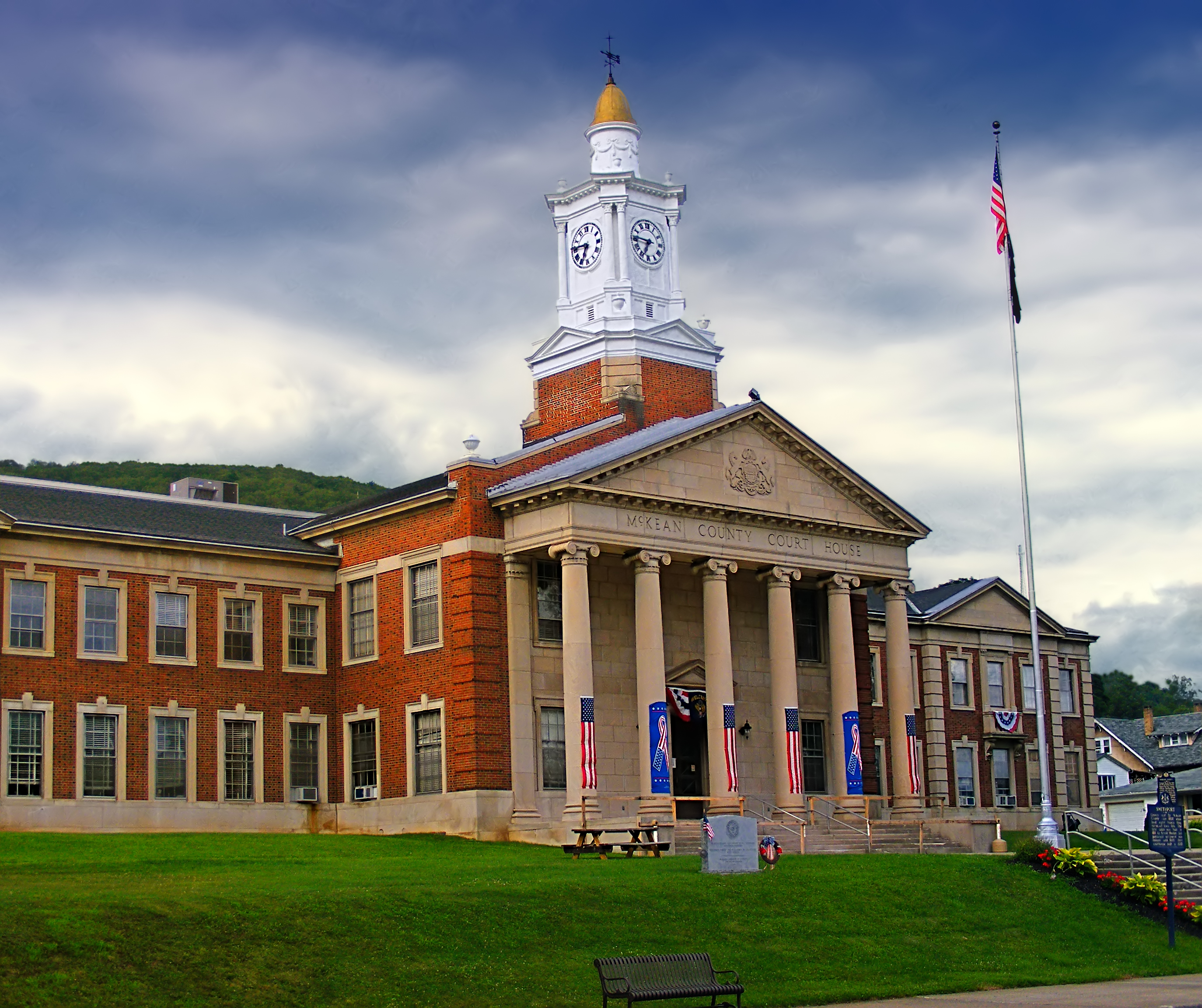
- McKean County Courthouse

- Location in McKean County, Pennsylvania
- Coordinates: 41°49′N 78°27′W
- Country: United States
- State: Pennsylvania
- County: McKean
- Settled: 1807
- Incorporated: 1853

Government
  - Type: Borough council
  - Mayor: Wayne V. Foltz

Area
  - Total: 1.74 sq mi (4.5 km^{2})
  - Land: 1.68 sq mi (4.4 km^{2})
  - Water: 0.06 sq mi (0.16 km^{2})

Population (2020)
  - Total: 1,436 ▼
  - Estimate (2021): 1,412
  - Density: 941.6/sq mi (363.54/km^{2})
- Time zone: UTC-5 (Eastern (EST))
  - Summer (DST): UTC-4 (EDT)
- ZIP Code: 16749
- Area code: 814
- FIPS code: 42-71248
- Website: www.smethportpa.org

Smethport is a borough in and the county seat of McKean County, Pennsylvania, United States. The mayor is Wayne V. Foltz. The population was 1,436 at the 2020 census. Smethport is part of the Bradford, PA micropolitan statistical area. Smethport holds the record of having had the coldest temperature ever recorded in Pennsylvania: −42 °F (−41 °C) on January 5, 1904.

== History ==
Smethport was founded in 1807 by Dutch land investors who were surveying a large tract of land they had purchased from the Commonwealth of Pennsylvania, and was named in honor of a Dutch banking family, the De Smeths, who financed the land investments. The town's first business was a water-powered sawmill built by John Applebee in 1822. Smethport became the McKean County seat in 1826 and was incorporated as a borough in 1853. The sawmill's artificial pond is now the centerpiece of Hamlin Park. Smethport has ties to General Thomas L. Kane who organized the Bucktail Regiment during the Civil War; the borough is home to an active group of Bucktail re-enactors.

The borough has been the location of offices for several forest industry firms. From the 1870s to the early 1900s, Smethport was an important center for the East Coast hardwoods industry and enjoyed a timber-fueled economic boom that allowed the construction of many mansions that today make up a historic architectural district.

The first magnetic toys in the country were invented in Smethport in 1908. The Wooly Willy toy, a hit in the 1950s and still in production, was created in Smethport by Donald and James Herzog of the Smethport Specialty Company. In 2004 Smethport was selected as Pennsylvania's first Route 6 Heritage Community, as a part of a heritage tourism development program.

== Geography ==
Smethport is situated in east-central McKean County, within the Pennsylvania Wilds region on the Allegheny Plateau. The borough is in a hilly area about 15 miles (24 km) east of Allegheny National Forest and 11 miles (18 km) northeast of Kinzua Bridge State Park. By road, Smethport is slightly over 100 miles (160 km) east of Erie (a two-hour drive) and 95 miles (153 km) south of Buffalo.

U.S. Route 6 passes through Smethport as its Main Street. It leads southwest 14 miles (23 km) to Mount Jewett and east 10 miles (16 km) to Port Allegany. Pennsylvania Route 59 has its eastern terminus in Smethport and leads west 42 miles (68 km) to Warren. Pennsylvania Route 46 passes through the northeast corner of Smethport, leading northwest 18 miles (29 km) to Bradford, the largest community in McKean County, and southeast 26 miles (42 km) to Emporium, passing over the Eastern Continental Divide along the way.

According to the U.S. Census Bureau, Smethport has a total area of 1.74 square miles (4.51 km^{2}), of which 1.68 square miles (4.35 km^{2}) are land and 0.06 square miles (0.16 km^{2}), or 3.45%, are water. Potato Creek, a north-flowing tributary of the Allegheny River, forms the eastern border of the borough. Marvin Creek, a tributary of Potato Creek, passes just south of the center of town, and Blacksmith Run joins it from the west.

Smethport's elevation is 1,560 feet (480 m) above sea level, within the valley of Potato Creek. Prospect Hill, elevation 2,438 feet (743 m), rises above the borough to the east.

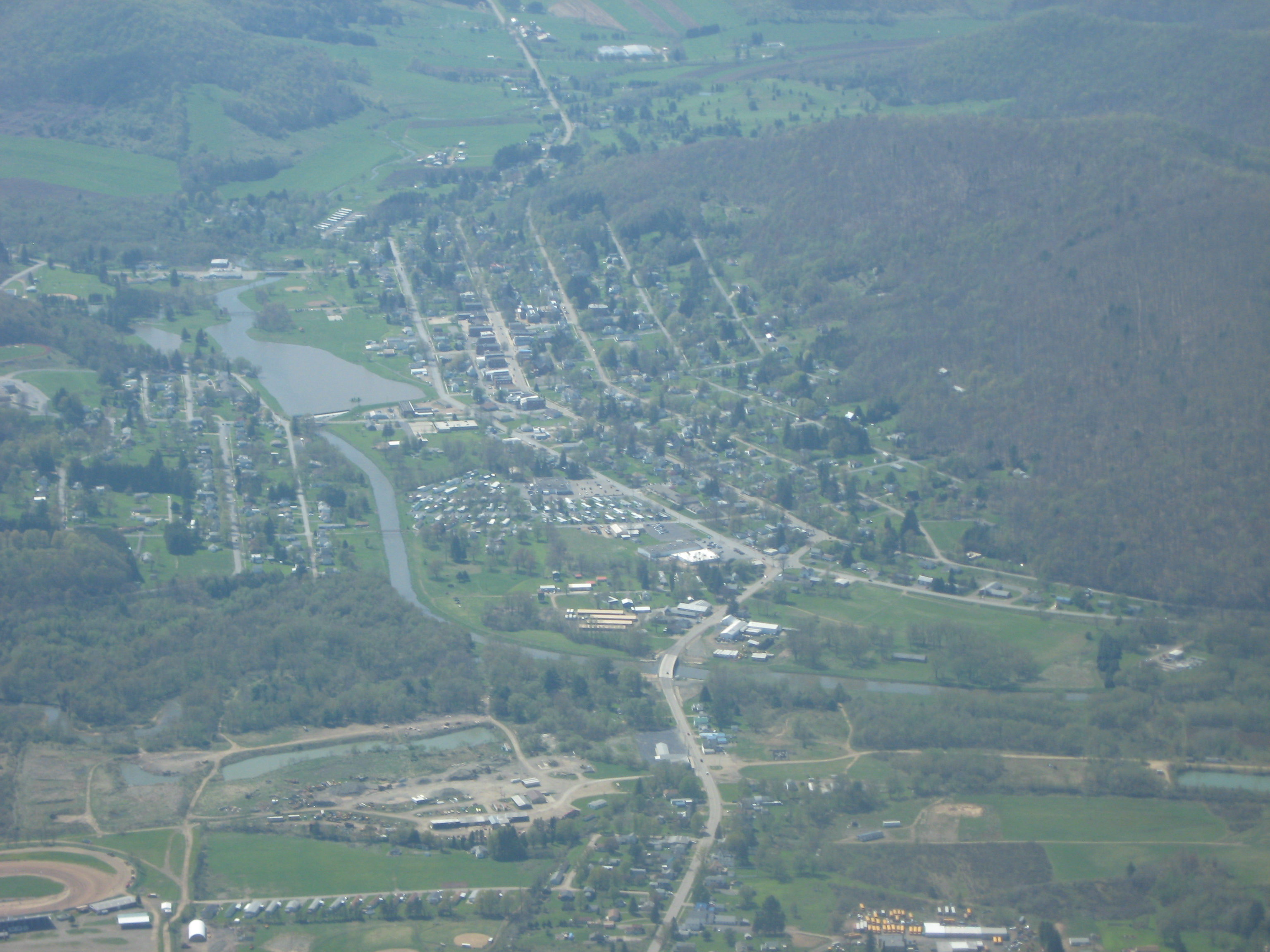
Aerial view of Smethport, looking west (May 2008)

=== Climate ===
This climatic region is typified by large seasonal temperature differences, with warm to hot (and often humid) summers and cold (sometimes severely cold) winters. According to the Köppen Climate Classification system, Smethport has a humid continental climate, abbreviated "Dfb" on climate maps.

The lowest temperature ever recorded in Pennsylvania, −42 °F (−41 °C), was at Smethport on January 5, 1904. Smethport is tied with Lawrenceville for the state February record minimum temperature of −39 °F (−39 °C).

The central Appalachian region has experienced some of the largest rainfall accumulations in the world at time intervals less than 6 hours, including the July 18, 1942, Smethport, Pennsylvania, storm that produced 780 mm (30.7 inches) in less than 5 hours.

Smethport is the location of one of the heaviest documented short-duration storms in world history.

== Demographics ==
Historical population
Census	Pop.	Note	%±
1860	313		—
1870	231		−26.2%
1880	872		277.5%
1890	1,150		31.9%
1900	1,704		48.2%
1910	1,817		6.6%
1920	1,568		−13.7%
1930	1,733		10.5%
1940	1,840		6.2%
1950	1,797		−2.3%
1960	1,725		−4.0%
1970	1,883		9.2%
1980	1,797		−4.6%
1990	1,734		−3.5%
2000	1,684		−2.9%
2010	1,655		−1.7%
2020	1,436		−13.2%
2021 (est.)	1,412	▼	−1.7%

As of the census of 2010, there were 1,655 people, 718 households, and 470 families residing in the borough. The population density was 1,009.5 inhabitants per square mile (389.8/km^{2}). There were 801 housing units at an average density of 443.0 per square mile (171.0/km^{2}). The racial makeup of the borough was 99.05% White, 0.00% African American, 0.00% Native American, 0.06% Asian, 0.12% from other races, and 0.18% from two or more races. Hispanic or Latino of any race were 0.59% of the population.

There were 686 households, out of which 33.1% had children under the age of 18 living with them, 52.8% were married couples living together, 10.6% had a female householder with no husband present, and 33.4% were non-families. 29.9% of all households were made up of individuals, and 15.3% had someone living alone who was 65 years of age or older. The average household size was 2.38 and the average family size was 2.94.

In the borough the population was spread out, with 26.0% under the age of 18, 6.7% from 18 to 24, 25.8% from 25 to 44, 22.7% from 45 to 64, and 18.9% who were 65 years of age or older. The median age was 40 years. For every 100 females there were 86.1 males. For every 100 females age 18 and over, there were 80.2 males.

The median income for a household in the borough was $34,934, and the median income for a family was $42,153. Males had a median income of $30,962 versus $22,159 for females. The per capita income for the borough was $17,297. About 7.6% of families and 8.0% of the population were below the poverty line, including 9.4% of those under age 18 and 8.2% of those age 65 or over.

== Notable businesses ==
Smethport Specialty Company, which manufactured Wooly Willy and other magnetic toys. (Sold to Patch Products, August 2008. Plant shut down February 2014.)

America's First Christmas Store, opened in 1935 and was the nation's first year-round yuletide shop. (closed 2005)

Hamlin Bank and Trust Company, a community bank founded by Henry Hamlin in 1863.

"Chef Specialties Company, founded in 1940, is America's first manufacturer and purveyor of pepper and spice mills.

Backus Company, a precision metal stamping manufacturer, founded in 1906.

== Education ==
Smethport is served by the Smethport Area School District. It operates one elementary school and one high school.

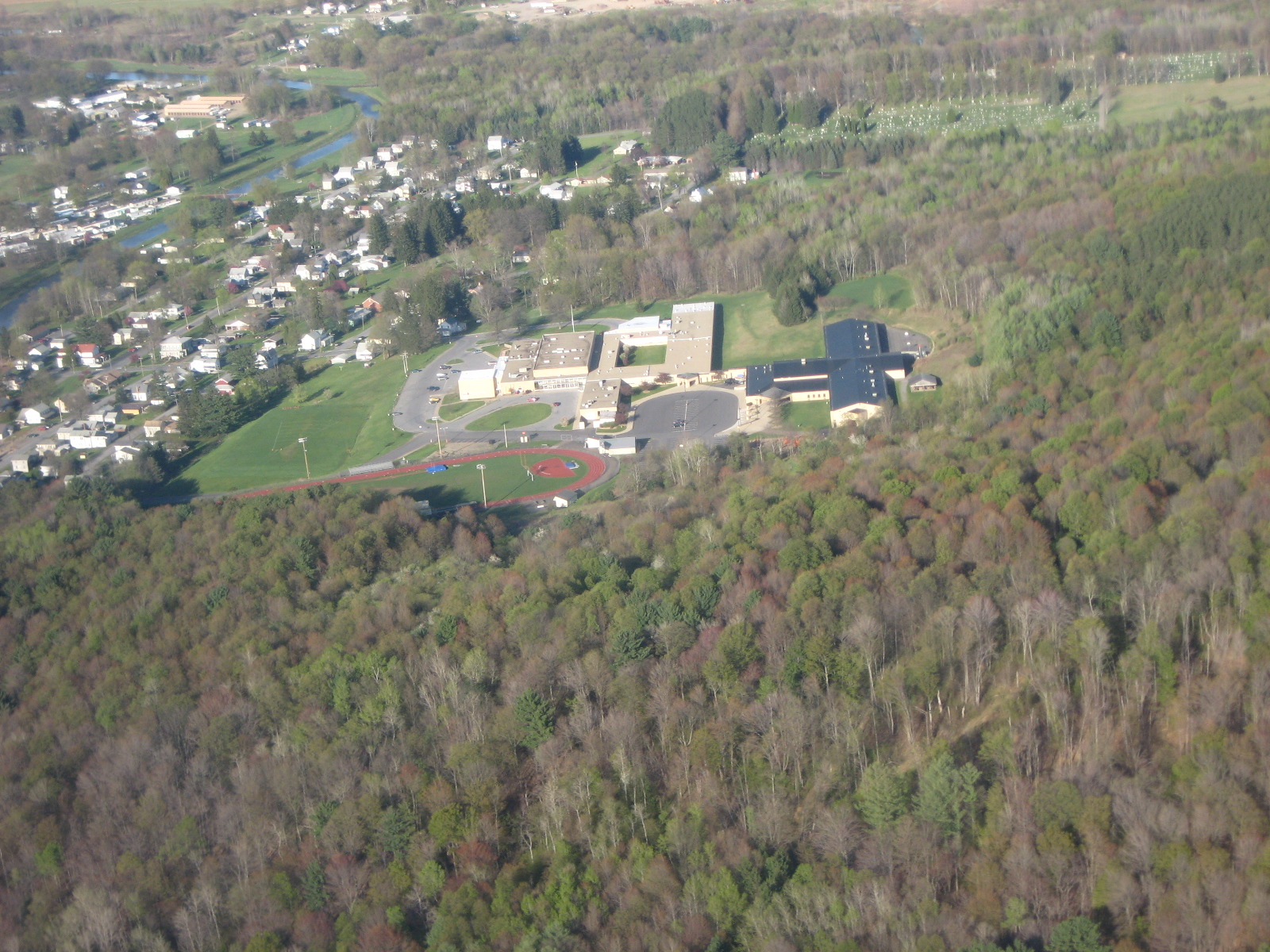
Smethport High School (left) and Elementary School (right). Click for a larger view.
