= McKean County, Pennsylvania =

County in Pennsylvania, United States

- County
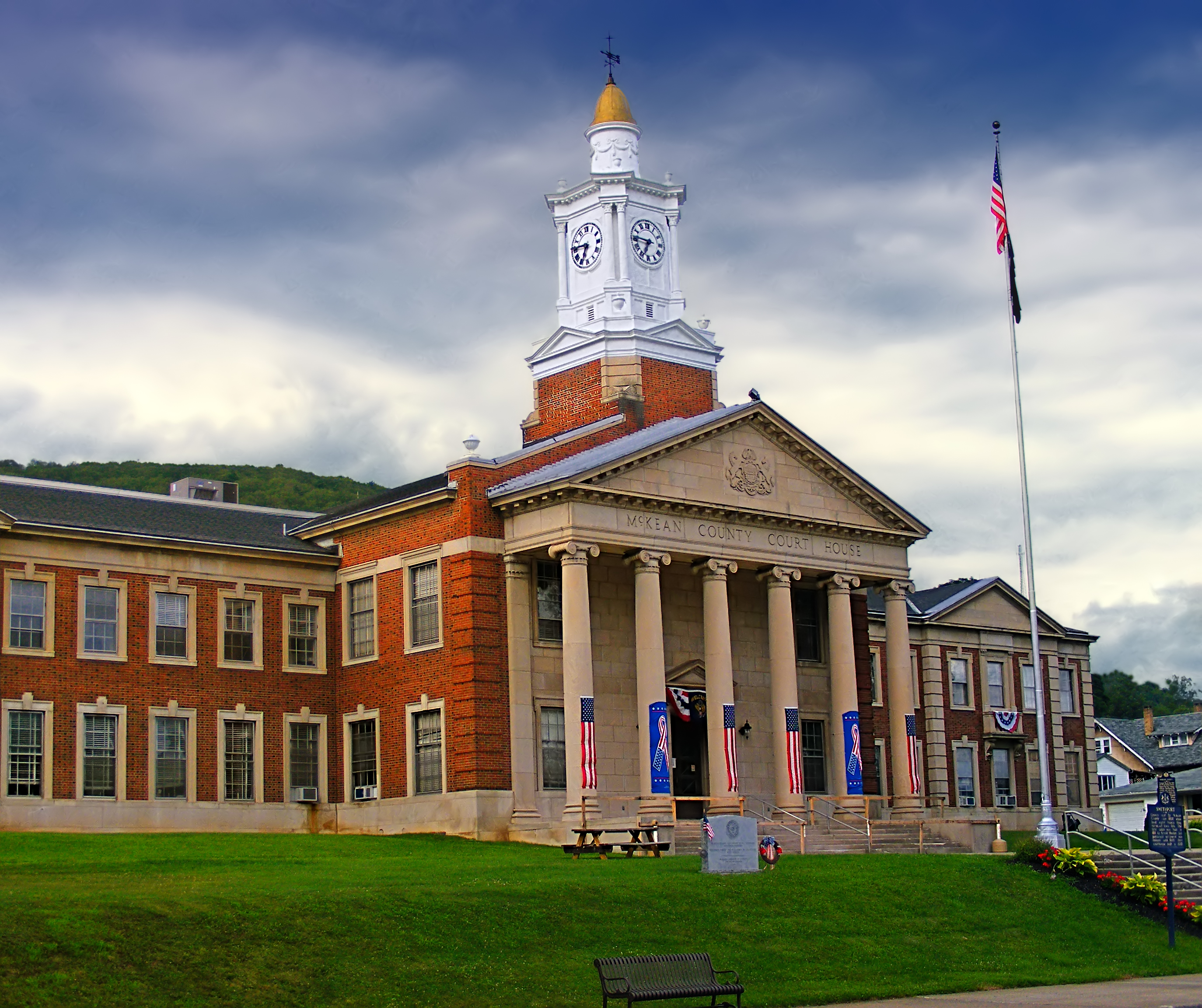
- McKean County Courthouse

- Seal

- Location within the U.S. state of Pennsylvania
- Coordinates: 41°48′40″N 78°26′41″W
- Country: United States
- State: Pennsylvania
- Founded: September 1, 1826
- Named for: Thomas McKean
- Seat: Smethport
- Largest city: Bradford

Area
  - Total: 984 sq mi (2,550 km^{2})
  - Land: 979 sq mi (2,540 km^{2})
  - Water: 5.0 sq mi (13 km^{2}) 0.5%

Population (2020)
  - Total: 40,432
  - Estimate (2025): 38,984 ▼
  - Density: 41/sq mi (16/km^{2})
- Time zone: UTC−5 (Eastern)
  - Summer (DST): UTC−4 (EDT)
- Congressional district: 15th
- Website: www.mckeancountypa.gov

McKean County is a rural county in the Commonwealth of Pennsylvania. As of the 2020 census, the population was 40,432. Its county seat is Smethport. The county was created in 1804 and organized in 1826. It was named in honor of former Pennsylvania Governor and Declaration of Independence signer Thomas McKean. The county is part of the North Central Pennsylvania region of the state. (Note: Includes Clearfield, Jefferson, Tioga, McKean, Warren, Clarion, Elk, Potter, Forest and Cameron Counties)

McKean County comprises the Bradford, Pennsylvania micropolitan statistical area. It includes the Allegheny National Forest and borders New York. The Allegheny River flows through much of the eastern portion of the county, and the Allegheny Reservoir is accessible on the county’s western border. McKean County boasts of being "The Black Cherry Capital of the World."

McKean County was settled because of its natural resources of oil and timber, both of which continue to provide significant input to the local economy. Today, a university, rural medical center, federal prison and numerous manufacturing companies balance the area's economy.

== Geography ==
According to the U.S. Census Bureau, the county has an area of 984 square miles (2,550 km^{2}), of which 979 square miles (2,540 km^{2}) is land and 5.0 square miles (13 km^{2}) (0.5%) is water. It has a warm-summer humid continental climate (Dfb) and average monthly temperatures in downtown Bradford range from 23.0 °F in January to 67.6 °F in July, while in Mount Jewett they range from 21.2 °F in January to 65.1 °F in July.

=== Adjacent counties ===
- Cattaraugus County, New York (north)
- Allegany County, New York (northeast)
- Potter County (east)
- Cameron County (southeast)
- Elk County (south)
- Forest County (southwest)
- Warren County (west)

=== Major highways ===
- US 6
- US 219
- PA 44
- PA 46
- PA 59
- PA 146
- PA 155
- PA 321
- PA 346
- PA 446
- PA 546
- PA 646
- PA 770

=== National protected area ===
- Allegheny National Forest (part)
- Allegheny National Recreation Area (part)

== Demographics ==
Historical population
Census	Pop.	Note	%±
1810	142		—
1820	728		412.7%
1830	1,439		97.7%
1840	2,975		106.7%
1850	5,254		76.6%
1860	8,859		68.6%
1870	8,825		−0.4%
1880	42,565		382.3%
1890	46,863		10.1%
1900	51,343		9.6%
1910	47,868		−6.8%
1920	48,934		2.2%
1930	55,167		12.7%
1940	56,673		2.7%
1950	56,607		−0.1%
1960	54,517		−3.7%
1970	51,915		−4.8%
1980	50,635		−2.5%
1990	47,131		−6.9%
2000	45,963		−2.5%
2010	43,450		−5.5%
2020	40,432		−6.9%
2025 (est.)	38,984	▼	−3.6%
U.S. Decennial Census; 1790–1960 1900–1990; 1990–2000 2010–2017

=== Racial and ethnic composition ===
McKean County, Pennsylvania – Racial and ethnic composition Note: the US Census treats Hispanic/Latino as an ethnic category. This table excludes Latinos from the racial categories and assigns them to a separate category. Hispanics/Latinos may be of any race.
Race / Ethnicity (NH = Non-Hispanic)	Pop 1980	Pop 1990	Pop 2000	Pop 2010	Pop 2020	% 1980	% 1990	% 2000	% 2010	% 2020
White alone (NH)	50,151	45,888	44,078	41,039	36,991	99.04%	97.36%	95.96%	94.45%	91.49%
Black or African American alone (NH)	94	460	829	1,008	849	0.19%	0.98%	1.80%	2.32%	2.10%
Native American or Alaska Native alone (NH)	92	106	132	83	102	0.18%	0.22%	0.29%	0.19%	0.25%
Asian alone (NH)	114	150	138	191	193	0.23%	0.32%	0.30%	0.44%	0.48%
Native Hawaiian or Pacific Islander alone (NH)	x	x	6	3	2	x	x	0.01%	0.01%	0.00%
Other race alone (NH)	24	16	29	13	82	0.05%	0.03%	0.06%	0.03%	0.20%
Mixed race or Multiracial (NH)	x	x	239	356	1,571	x	x	0.52%	0.82%	3.89%
Hispanic or Latino (any race)	160	511	485	757	642	0.32%	1.08%	1.06%	1.74%	1.59%
Total	50,635	47,131	45,936	43,450	40,432	100.00%	100.00%	100.00%	100.00%	100.00%

=== 2020 census ===
As of the 2020 census, the county had a population of 40,432. The median age was 44.0 years. 20.1% of residents were under the age of 18 and 20.7% of residents were 65 years of age or older. For every 100 females there were 103.2 males, and for every 100 females age 18 and over there were 102.1 males age 18 and over.

The racial makeup of the county was majority White, with smaller Black or African American, American Indian and Alaska Native, Asian, Pacific Islander, some other race, and multiracial populations, while Hispanic or Latino residents of any race comprised 1.6% of the population.

27.6% of residents lived in urban areas, while 72.4% lived in rural areas.

There were 16,470 households in the county, of which 25.7% had children under the age of 18 living in them. Of all households, 45.1% were married-couple households, 20.6% were households with a male householder and no spouse or partner present, and 25.4% were households with a female householder and no spouse or partner present. About 31.5% of all households were made up of individuals and 14.7% had someone living alone who was 65 years of age or older.

There were 19,416 housing units, of which 15.2% were vacant. Among occupied housing units, 74.2% were owner-occupied and 25.8% were renter-occupied. The homeowner vacancy rate was 1.9% and the rental vacancy rate was 9.4%.

=== 2000 census ===
As of the 2000 census, there were 45,936 people, 18,024 households, and 12,094 families residing in the county. The population density was 47 people per square mile (18 people/km^{2}). There were 21,644 housing units at an average density of 22 units per square mile (8.5/km^{2}). The racial makeup of the county was 96.46% White, 1.87% Black, 0.32% Native American, 0.30% Asian, 0.02% Pacific Islander, 0.40% from other races, and 0.61% from two or more races. 1.06% of the population were Hispanic or Latino of any race. 35.0% German, 22.2% Irish, 14.6% Italian, 12.3% English, 10.0% Swedish, 8.6% American, 5.8% Polish, and 3.7% French ancestry.

There were 18,024 households, out of which 30.50% had children under the age of 18 living with them, 52.50% were married couples living together, 10.10% had a female householder with no husband present, and 32.90% were non-families. 28.30% of all households were made up of individuals, and 13.30% had someone living alone who was 65 years of age or older. The average household size was 2.40 and the average family size was 2.93.

In the county, the age distribution of the population shows 23.70% under the age of 18, 7.90% from 18 to 24, 28.50% from 25 to 44, 23.20% from 45 to 64, and 16.70% who were 65 years of age or older. The median age was 39 years. For every 100 females there were 100.40 males. For every 100 females age 18 and over, there were 98.70 males.

== Micropolitan Statistical Area ==
The United States Office of Management and Budget has designated McKean County as the Bradford, PA micropolitan statistical area (USA). As of the 2010 U.S. census the micropolitan area ranked 13th most populous in Pennsylvania and the 277th most populous in the United States with a population of 43,450.

== Law and government ==
United States presidential election results for McKean County, Pennsylvania
Year	Republican		Democratic		Third party(ies)	
Year	No.	%	No.	%	No.	%
1888	4,066	52.74%	2,922	37.90%	721	9.35%
1892	3,594	50.01%	2,843	39.56%	750	10.44%
1896	5,077	59.59%	3,074	36.08%	369	4.33%
1900	6,319	61.39%	3,427	33.29%	547	5.31%
1904	5,719	67.48%	1,636	19.30%	1,120	13.22%
1908	5,073	58.01%	2,867	32.78%	805	9.21%
1912	1,345	16.81%	2,362	29.52%	4,294	53.67%
1916	4,300	51.81%	3,161	38.09%	838	10.10%
1920	7,830	68.65%	2,505	21.96%	1,071	9.39%
1924	9,072	68.99%	2,376	18.07%	1,701	12.94%
1928	14,012	73.49%	4,964	26.04%	90	0.47%
1932	9,970	65.01%	4,661	30.39%	704	4.59%
1936	11,837	53.37%	9,733	43.88%	611	2.75%
1940	14,822	67.58%	6,991	31.88%	119	0.54%
1944	11,988	64.45%	6,492	34.90%	121	0.65%
1948	10,218	66.91%	4,785	31.33%	269	1.76%
1952	15,256	73.43%	5,373	25.86%	147	0.71%
1956	14,725	73.81%	5,152	25.82%	73	0.37%
1960	13,699	63.62%	7,767	36.07%	66	0.31%
1964	7,948	41.82%	10,950	57.61%	109	0.57%
1968	10,506	59.67%	6,326	35.93%	775	4.40%
1972	11,958	71.72%	4,513	27.07%	202	1.21%
1976	10,305	60.88%	6,424	37.95%	197	1.16%
1980	9,229	60.85%	5,064	33.39%	873	5.76%
1984	10,963	69.22%	4,818	30.42%	58	0.37%
1988	9,323	63.22%	5,300	35.94%	124	0.84%
1992	6,965	42.47%	5,331	32.51%	4,104	25.02%
1996	6,838	45.99%	5,509	37.05%	2,522	16.96%
2000	9,661	61.12%	5,510	34.86%	635	4.02%
2004	10,941	62.79%	6,294	36.12%	191	1.10%
2008	9,224	57.61%	6,465	40.38%	321	2.00%
2012	9,545	62.99%	5,297	34.95%	312	2.06%
2016	11,635	70.67%	4,025	24.45%	804	4.88%
2020	14,083	72.18%	5,098	26.13%	329	1.69%
2024	14,401	72.92%	5,115	25.90%	234	1.18%

United States Senate election results for McKean County, Pennsylvania1
Year	Republican		Democratic		Third party(ies)	
Year	No.	%	No.	%	No.	%
1994	7,579	67.98%	3,285	29.46%	285	2.56%
2000	9,804	68.09%	4,304	29.89%	290	2.01%
2006	5,928	54.23%	5,003	45.77%	0	0.00%
2012	9,250	61.99%	5,355	35.89%	316	2.12%
2018	8,285	66.52%	3,972	31.89%	197	1.58%
2024	13,799	70.51%	5,231	26.73%	541	2.76%

United States Senate election results for McKean County, Pennsylvania3
Year	Republican		Democratic		Third party(ies)	
Year	No.	%	No.	%	No.	%
1992	7,768	51.90%	6,455	43.13%	744	4.97%
1998	6,332	69.15%	2,505	27.36%	320	3.49%
2004	10,931	67.93%	4,275	26.57%	886	5.51%
2010	6,801	68.64%	3,107	31.36%	0	0.00%
2016	11,530	71.52%	3,987	24.73%	605	3.75%
2022	10,076	68.77%	4,135	28.22%	440	3.00%

Pennsylvania Gubernatorial election results for McKean County
Year	Republican		Democratic		Third party(ies)	
Year	No.	%	No.	%	No.	%
1970	7,297	57.31%	5,284	41.50%	152	1.19%
1974	7,883	61.60%	4,774	37.31%	140	1.09%
1978	7,106	65.69%	3,586	33.15%	126	1.16%
1982	7,352	62.46%	4,335	36.83%	84	0.71%
1986	6,976	59.79%	4,579	39.24%	113	0.97%
1990	3,893	43.05%	5,151	56.95%	0	0.00%
1994	6,359	54.67%	2,925	25.15%	2,348	20.19%
1998	6,742	68.43%	2,086	21.17%	1,024	10.39%
2002	6,373	64.94%	3,215	32.76%	225	2.29%
2006	5,890	53.87%	5,044	46.13%	0	0.00%
2010	7,117	72.03%	2,763	27.97%	0	0.00%
2014	5,311	64.33%	2,945	35.67%	0	0.00%
2018	8,512	67.59%	3,899	30.96%	182	1.45%
2022	10,082	68.53%	4,392	29.85%	238	1.62%

=== Voter registration ===
As of February 21, 2022, there are 24,893 registered voters in McKean County.

Chart of Voter Registration
1. Republican (61.7%)
2. Democratic (24.2%)
3. Independent (9.22%)
4. Third Party (4.83%)
- Democratic: 6,037 (24.25%)
- Republican: 15,357 (61.69%)
- Independent: 2,296 (9.22%)
- Third Party: 1,203 (4.83%)

=== State Senate ===
- Cris Dush, Republican, Pennsylvania's 25th Senatorial District

=== State House of Representatives ===
- Martin T. Causer, Republican, Pennsylvania's 67th Representative District

=== United States House of Representatives ===
- Glenn Thompson, Republican, Pennsylvania's 15th congressional district

=== United States Senate ===
- John Fetterman, Democrat
- Dave McCormick, Republican

== Education ==
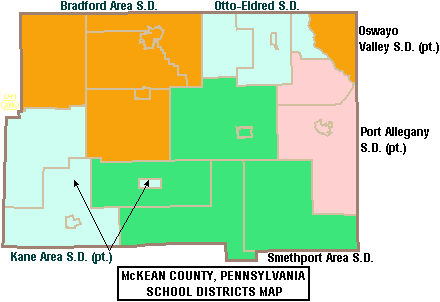
Map of McKean County, Pennsylvania School Districts

=== Public school districts ===
School districts include:

- Bradford Area School District
- Kane Area School District (also covers part of Elk County)
- Oswayo Valley School District (majority of which is in Potter County, covers small portion in McKean County)
- Otto-Eldred School District
- Port Allegany School District (also covers part of Potter County)
- Smethport Area School District

=== Private schools ===
As reported by EdNA, Pennsylvania Department of Education, June 2010.

- Bradford Area Christian Academy, Bradford
- Custer City Private School
- Learning Center Inc, Bradford
- United Christian Academy, Smethport

=== Libraries ===
- Bradford Area Public Library
- Friends Memorial Public Library - Kane
- Hamlin Memorial Library - Smethport
- Mount Jewett Memorial Library
- Samuel W Smith Memorial Public Library - Port Allegany

=== Other education entities ===
- Beacon Light Behavioral Health Systems - Custer City
- McKean County Historical Society's Museum at the Old Jail - Smethport
- Seneca Highlands Career and Technical Center - Port Allegany
- Seneca Highlands IU 9 - Smethport
- University of Pittsburgh at Bradford

== Recreation ==
There is one Pennsylvania state park in McKean County. Kinzua Bridge State Park is between U.S. Route 6 and Pennsylvania Route 59, just east of the Allegheny National Forest near Mount Jewett. When it was built, it was the highest and longest railroad bridge in the world. It was chosen by the Pennsylvania Department of Conservation and Natural Resources (DCNR) and its Bureau of Parks as one of "Twenty Must-See Pennsylvania State Parks" and is a Historic Civil Engineering Landmark. A tornado destroyed much of the bridge in 2003, and a skywalk and viewing platform have since been installed on its remnants.

== Communities ==
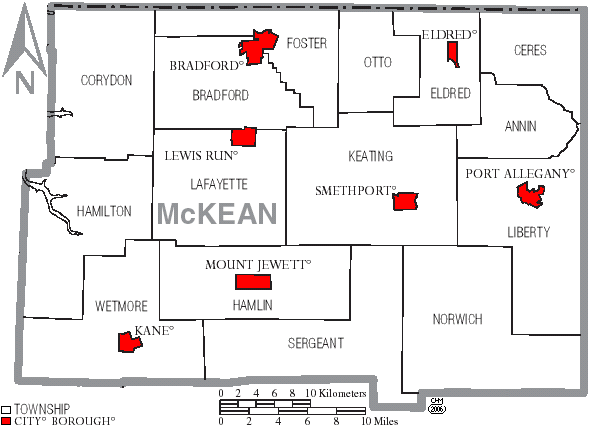
Map of McKean County, Pennsylvania with Municipal Labels showing Cities and Boroughs (red) and Townships (white).

Under Pennsylvania law, there are four types of incorporated municipalities: cities, boroughs, townships, and, in at most two cases, towns. The following cities, boroughs and townships are located in McKean County:

=== City ===
- Bradford

=== Boroughs ===
- Eldred
- Kane
- Lewis Run
- Mount Jewett
- Port Allegany
- Smethport (county seat)

=== Townships ===
- Annin
- Bradford
- Ceres
- Corydon
- Eldred
- Foster
- Hamilton
- Hamlin
- Keating
- Lafayette
- Liberty
- Norwich
- Otto
- Sergeant
- Wetmore

=== Census-designated places ===
- Foster Brook
- Rew
- University of Pittsburgh Bradford

=== Unincorporated communities ===
- Burning Well
- Coryville
- Cyclone
- Derrick City
- Farmers Valley
- Gifford
- Ludlow

=== Population ranking ===
The population ranking of the following table is based on the 2010 census of McKean County.

† county seat

Rank	City/Town/etc.	Municipal type	Population (2010 Census)
1	Bradford	City	8,770
2	Kane	Borough	3,730
3	Port Allegany	Borough	2,157
4	† Smethport	Borough	1,655
5	Foster Brook	CDP	1,251
6	Mount Jewett	Borough	919
7	Eldred	Borough	875
8	Lewis Run	Borough	617
9	Rew	CDP	199

== See also ==
- National Register of Historic Places listings in McKean County, Pennsylvania
