= Former state routes in Pennsylvania =

Obsolete highway numbers in the US

The following is a list of former state routes in Pennsylvania. These roads are now either parts of other routes or no longer carry a traffic route number. This list also includes original routes of numbers that were decommissioned and later reactivated in other locations in which most of these are still active today.

== PA 1 (1920s) ==
Pennsylvania Route 1
- Location: Hookstown–Morrisville
- Existed: 1924–1928

Pennsylvania Route 1 was the designation for the Lincoln Highway in Pennsylvania between 1924 and 1928. It is now US 30 west of Philadelphia and US 1 east of Philadelphia.

== PA 2 ==
Pennsylvania Route 2
- Location: Philadelphia–Great Bend
- Length: 163 mi (262 km)
- Existed: 1924–1928

The former Pennsylvania Route 2 was the designation for the Lackawanna Trail and was formed in 1924, running south to north from Philadelphia to the New York state line for a distance of 163 miles (262 km). The route passed through Philadelphia, Montgomery, Bucks, Northampton, Monroe, Wayne, Lackawanna, Wyoming, and Susquehanna Counties.

The origins of the highway lie in 1918, when the Motor Club of Lackawanna County petitioned to have the former road bed of the Delaware, Lackawanna and Western Railroad from Clark's Summit to Hallstead rebuilt as a highway. Construction of the highway from the New York state line to Scranton in 1919, and by 1920 the Lackawanna Trail was listed on auto trail maps. At the time of construction, the highway in Pennsylvania only extended to Darlington's Bridge, while the Gap Way extended from this point to Philadelphia. Rand McNally lists an extension of the Lackawanna Trail to Hackettstown, New Jersey, where it met the William Penn Highway. In 1924, Pennsylvania incorporated the Gap Way into the Lackawanna Trail, completing the cross-state route.

Deleted in 1928, PA 2 followed the former U.S. Route 611 from Philadelphia to Scranton (now Pennsylvania Route 611 between Philadelphia and Tobyhanna and Pennsylvania Route 435 between Gouldsboro and Dunmore), and the current U.S. Route 11 from there to the New York state line near Great Bend. The route originally continued as New York State Route 2 (now US 11).

Browse numbered routes
← PA 1	PA	→ PA 3

== PA 3 ==
Pennsylvania Route 3
- Location: Hanover Township–Easton
- Existed: 1924–1930

The original Pennsylvania Route 3 was the designation for the William Penn Highway running from Hanover Township to Easton. After its decommissioning in 1930, PA 3 was renumbered in several areas to extend active routes, including US 22 from the WV/PA state line to Harrisburg, PA 60 from Robinson Township to Pittsburgh, US 322 from Harrisburg to Hershey, US 422 from Hershey to Wyomissing, US 422 Business from Wyomissing to Reading, US 222 Business from Reading to Laureldale, US 222 from Laureldale to Dorneyville (except the Kutztown and Trexlertown/Wescosville bypasses), and PA 222 from Dorneyville to Allentown.

PA 3 was reactivated in 1936 to its current alignment from West Chester to downtown Philadelphia.

== PA 4 ==
Pennsylvania Route 4
- Location: Shrewsbury–Lawrenceville
- Length: 209 mi (336 km)
- Existed: 1924–1930

The former Pennsylvania Route 4 was formed in 1924, and ran south to north from the Maryland state line near Shrewsbury to the New York state line near Lawrenceville for a distance of 209 miles (336 km). The route passed through York, Cumberland, Dauphin, Perry, Juniata, Snyder, Northumberland, Lycoming, and Tioga Counties.

Deleted in 1930, PA Route 4 followed the former US 111 alignment from Maryland state line to Harrisburg; US 22 from Harrisburg to Amity Hall; US 11 along with the former US 111 from Amity Hall to Northumberland; the former US 120 from Northumberland to Williamsport; and again the former US 111 from Williamsport to the New York state line.

Browse numbered routes
← PA 3	PA	→ PA 5

== PA 5 ==
Pennsylvania Route 5
- Location: Erie–Philadelphia
- Length: 376 mi (605 km)
- Existed: 1924–1936

The original Pennsylvania Route 5 was the designation for the Lakes-to-Sea Highway running from Erie to Philadelphia. It is now US 19, US 322, and PA 3.

== PA 6 ==
Pennsylvania Route 6
- Location: Salisbury–Bradford
- Existed: 1924–1928

Pennsylvania Route 6 is the former designation for what is now US 219.

== PA 7 ==
Pennsylvania Route 7
- Location: Erie – Matamoras
- Existed: 1924–1930

Pennsylvania Route 7 is the former designation for what became US 6 between Erie and Matamoras.

== PA 9 (1920s) ==
Pennsylvania Route 9
- Location: West Springfield–North East
- Existed: 1924–1930

Pennsylvania Route 9 is the former designation for what is now US 20 in Erie County.

== PA 9 (1980s) ==
Pennsylvania Route 9
- Location: Plymouth Meeting–Clarks Summit
- Existed: 1974–1996

Pennsylvania Route 9 was the designation for the Northeast Extension of the Pennsylvania Turnpike from 1974 to 1996, when it was replaced by I-476.

== PA 10 ==
Pennsylvania Route 10
- Location: Blairsville–DuBois
- Length: 58.0 mi (93.3 km)
- Existed: 1924–1930

The original Pennsylvania Route 10 was designated on the current segment of US 119 between Blairsville/Indiana County and DuBois/Clearfield County. In the 1928 renumbering, PA 10 extended north on the current segment of US 219 to New York, replacing part of PA 6. The route number was reactivated in 1956 and applied to the route now aligned through Chester, Lancaster, and Berks Counties.

== PA 11 ==
Pennsylvania Route 11
- Location: West Alexander–Addison
- Existed: 1924–1928

Pennsylvania Route 11 is the former designation for what is now US 40 in Pennsylvania.

== PA 12 (1920s) ==
Pennsylvania Route 12
- Location: Center Valley–Bartonsville
- Existed: 1924–1961

Pennsylvania Route 12 is the former designation for the Baltimore Pike from Nottingham to Philadelphia. In 1926, US 1 was overlaid on PA 12. In 1927, PA 12 extended north concurrent with US 309 (now PA 309) to Center Valley, and further north on what became PA 378 to Bethlehem. By 1928, PA 12 extended further north on what became PA 191 between Center Valley and Stockertown and a now-unnumbered road between Stockertown and Bartonsville that parallels the PA 33 freeway. In 1930, the sections that overlapped US 1 and US 309 were decommissioned, truncating the south end to Center Valley.

== PA 13 ==
Pennsylvania Route 13
- Location: State Line–Chestnut Hill
- Length: 169 mi (272 km)
- Existed: 1926–1928

Pennsylvania Route 13 was a 169-mile-long (272 km) state highway that ran through Franklin, Cumberland, Dauphin, Lebanon, Berks, Montgomery, and Philadelphia Counties. The western terminus was at the Maryland state line in State Line and the eastern terminus was at US 309 in Chestnut Hill. The route was replaced by US 11, US 22 and US 120.

Browse numbered routes
← US 13	PA	→ PA 14

== PA 15 ==
Pennsylvania Route 15
- Location: Wilkes-Barre–Mount Pocono
- Existed: 1927–1928

Pennsylvania Route 15 is the former designation for what became PA 115 between Wilkes-Barre and Mount Pocono.

== PA 17 ==
Pennsylvania Route 17
- Location: North East–NY 17 at New York state line
- Length: 6.999 mi (11.264 km)
- Existed: 1987–1999

The defunct Pennsylvania Route 17 in Erie County was the former designation of what is now I-86. It ran from I-90 to New York State Route 17 at the PA-NY state line. Do not confuse with the still-in-use PA 17 in Perry County, which was designated in 1928.

== PA 19 ==
Pennsylvania Route 19
- Location: Lewistown–Darbytown
- Length: 174.0 mi (280.0 km)
- Existed: 1926–1928

Pennsylvania Route 19 ran through eight Pennsylvania counties from Lewistown northeast to the Delaware River across from Narrowsburg, New York, and became parts of U.S. Route 522, U.S. Route 11, and U.S. Route 106 in the 1928 renumbering.

Part of the road was renumbered as PA 39; PA 139, PA 239, PA 339, PA 439, PA 539, and PA 639 are spurs of PA 39; several three-digit numbers ending in 19 were already used by U.S. Routes (US 119 and US 219).

Browse numbered routes
← US 19	PA	→ US 20

== PA 22 ==
Pennsylvania Route 22
- Location: Allentown–Wilkes-Barre
- Length: 60 mi (97 km)
- Existed: 1927–1930

Pennsylvania Route 22 was a 60-mile-long (97 km) state highway that ran through Lehigh, Carbon, and Luzerne Counties. The southern terminus was at PA 3 in Allentown and the northern terminus was at PA 19 in Wilkes-Barre. The route was decommissioned in 1930 and renumbered as an alignment of US 309 which was decommissioned and changed in February 1968 to its current designation of PA 309.

== PA 37 ==
Pennsylvania Route 37
- Location: Greeley–Shohola
- Existed: 1928–1967

Pennsylvania Route 37 is the former designation for what is now PA 434 between Greeley and Shohola.

== PA 43 (1920s) ==
Pennsylvania Route 43
- Location: Harrisburg–Bethlehem
- Length: 87.41 mi (140.67 km)
- Existed: 1927–1946

The original Pennsylvania Route 43 ran from U.S. Route 22, U.S. Route 11, and Pennsylvania Route 5 in Harrisburg to Pennsylvania Route 12 in Bethlehem. When the highway was truncated in 1932 along Susquehanna Street from Allentown to Bethlehem, its previous alignment was designated as U.S. Route 22.

== PA 43 (1950s) ==
Pennsylvania Route 43
- Location: King of Prussia–Philadelphia
- Length: 27.5 mi (44.3 km)
- Existed: 1952–1964

Pennsylvania Route 43 was reactivated in 1952 and reassigned along the Schuylkill Expressway (which was already designated as then-I-80S, thus forming a concurrency) from King of Prussia (at the Pennsylvania Turnpike) to the PA/NJ state line midway across the Walt Whitman Bridge. In 1964, both designations were dropped and the expressway was renumbered as an extension of I-76.

PA 43's third and current activation came in the 1980s as construction of the Mon-Fayette Expressway began.

== PA 47 (west) ==
Pennsylvania Route 47
- Location: Meadville–Pittsfield Township
- Existed: 1927–1928

Pennsylvania Route 47 is the former designation for what became PA 27 between Meadville and Pittsfield Township.

== PA 47 (central) ==
Pennsylvania Route 47
- Location: Emporium–Smethport
- Existed: 1927–1928

Pennsylvania Route 47 is the former designation for what became PA 46 between Emporium and Smethport.

== PA 47 (east) ==
Pennsylvania Route 47
- Location: Kingsley–Carbondale
- Existed: 1927–1930

Pennsylvania Route 47 is the former designation for what would become US 106 between Kingsley and Carbondale.

== PA 55 (west) ==
Pennsylvania Route 55
- Location: Sharon–Franklin
- Length: 41 mi (66 km)
- Existed: 1927–1928

Pennsylvania Route 55 was the designation for what became PA 65 (now US 62) between Sharon and Franklin.

== PA 55 (east) ==
Pennsylvania Route 55
- Location: Ridgway–Clinton County
- Existed: 1927–1930

Pennsylvania Route 55 was the designation for what would become US 120 between Ridgway and Clinton County.

== PA 57 ==
Pennsylvania Route 57
- Location: Oil City–Fryburg
- Existed: 1927–1932

Pennsylvania Route 57 was the designation for what became US 62 (now PA 157) between Oil City and Fryburg.

== PA 62 ==
Pennsylvania Route 62
- Location: Chadds Ford–Pleasant Corners
- Existed: 1927–1932

Pennsylvania Route 62 was the designation for what became PA 100 between Chadds Ford and Pleasant Corners.

== PA 65 ==
Pennsylvania Route 65
- Location: Sharon–Franklin
- Length: 43.0 mi (69.2 km)
- Existed: 1928–1932

The original Pennsylvania Route 65 was designated on the current U.S. 62 segment from the OH/PA state line outside of Sharon/Mercer County to PA 8 in Franklin/Venango County. PA 65 was reactivated and assigned in 1961 to its current Allegheny/Beaver/Lawrence County alignment.

== PA 67 (west) ==
Pennsylvania Route 67
- Location: Meadville–Riceville
- Existed: 1927–1928

Pennsylvania Route 67 was the designation for what became PA 77 between Meadville and Riceville.

== PA 67 (east) ==
Pennsylvania Route 67
- Location: Wyalusing–Milford
- Existed: 1927–1930

Pennsylvania Route 67 was the designation for what became US 106 (now PA 706) between Wyalusing and Milford.

== PA 70 ==
Pennsylvania Route 70
- Location: Carbondale–Great Bend
- Existed: 1928–1961

Pennsylvania Route 70 was the designation for what is now PA 171.

== PA 71 ==
Pennsylvania Route 71
- Location: North Bethlehem Township–Greensburg
- Length: 40 mi (64 km)
- Existed: 1928–1964

Pennsylvania Route 71 in Washington and Westmoreland Counties served the Washington-Greensburg corridor that Interstate 70 now serves. The western terminus of the route was at U.S. Route 40 in North Bethlehem Township and the eastern terminus was at U.S. Route 30 in Greensburg.

The freeway portion of the road was replaced with the opening of the replacement Pennsylvania Turnpike new station Interchange in 1964. The non freeway routing became Pennsylvania Route 917 from US 40 to then-Interstate 70S (now Interstate 70) in Bentleyville, I-70S from Bentleyville to Pennsylvania Route 201 near North Belle Vernon, PA 201 from I-70S to Pennsylvania Route 136 near West Newton, and PA 136 from PA 201 to US 30.

PA 71 had an alternate route, PA 71 Alternate, which was assigned in 1957 as the temporary designation for the four-lane divided highway between PA 519 near Washington and New Stanton that was known as the "Express Highway"; this road would be designated as I-70S (now I-70) following the completion of additional connecting roads in the Interstate Highway System.

In 1948, a drive-in theater was built on PA 71 in Rostraver Township, just off of I-70, and was named after its route: Super 71 Drive-In. This name was kept throughout its entire existence (1948–1995), even after the stretch of PA 71 it was located on was decommissioned and renumbered PA 201.

Browse numbered routes
← PA 70	PA	→ PA 72

== PA 76 (1920s) ==
Pennsylvania Route 76
- Location: Blairsville–DuBois
- Existed: 1927–1928

The original Pennsylvania Route 76 ran along the current U.S. 119 designation from Blairsville/Indiana County to DuBois/Clearfield County.

== PA 76 (1930s) ==
Pennsylvania Route 76
- Location: Warfordsburg–Reedsville
- Length: 80.0 mi (128.7 km)
- Existed: 1930–1964

The second Pennsylvania Route 76 designation ran from the Maryland state line near Warfordsburg/Fulton County to U.S. 322 in Reedsville/Mifflin County. PA 76 was decommissioned in 1964 and reassigned as current PA 655. SR 0076 was later assigned to its current designation on Interstate 76.

== PA 78 ==
Pennsylvania Route 78
- Location: Brady Township–Richmond Township
- Length: 55 mi (89 km)
- Existed: 1928–1961

Pennsylvania Route 78 was a 55-mile-long (89 km) north–south state highway located in western Pennsylvania. The southern terminus of the route was at Pennsylvania Route 8 in Brady Township/Butler County. The northern terminus was at Pennsylvania Route 408 in Richmond Township/Crawford County.

The route was deleted in 1961 and replaced with Pennsylvania Route 173 from PA 8 to Pennsylvania Route 27 and Pennsylvania Route 198 from PA 27 to Gilbert Road four miles (6 km) south of PA 408.

Browse numbered routes
← I-78	PA	→ I-79

== PA 79 ==
Pennsylvania Route 79
- Location: Concord Township–Union City
- Existed: 1928–1961

Pennsylvania Route 79 was the designation for what is now Pennsylvania Route 2010, a Quadrant Route located in southeastern Erie County, Pennsylvania. The southern terminus of the route is at Pennsylvania Route 89 in the Concord Township hamlet of Concord Corners. The northern terminus is at U.S. Route 6 and Pennsylvania Route 8 in Union City. PA 79, designated in 1928, was replaced by PA 178 in 1961. That same year, construction began on Interstate 79 which now bears the SR 0079 designation.

Browse numbered routes
← I-79	PA	→ I-80

== PA 80 ==
Pennsylvania Route 80
- Location: Pittsburgh–Glen Campbell
- Length: 96 mi (154 km)
- Existed: 1928–1961

Pennsylvania Route 80 was a 96-mile-long (154 km) east–west state highway in western Pennsylvania, running through Allegheny, Westmoreland, Indiana and Clearfield Counties. The western terminus of the route was at Interstate 70, U.S. Route 22, and U.S. Route 30 in Pittsburgh. The eastern terminus was at U.S. Route 219 northeast of Glen Campbell.

The route was deleted in 1961 and replaced by Pennsylvania Route 380 from US 22/US 30 to Dallas Avenue in Pittsburgh, Pennsylvania Route 8 from Dallas Avenue to US 22 exit 8 in Wilkinsburg, US 22 from Wilkinsburg to Pennsylvania Route 286 and PA 286 from US 22 to US 219. This designation change was made to reduce the number of concurrent routes in Pittsburgh. The changes took effect a few months later and signs were changed by spring 1961.

SR 0080 is now the designation for I-80.

Browse numbered routes
← I-80	PA	→ I-81

== PA 81 ==
Pennsylvania Route 81
- Location: West Alexander–Addison
- Length: 82.0 mi (132.0 km)
- Existed: 1926–1930

Pennsylvania Route 81 was the unsigned designation for the entire Pennsylvania segment of US 40 (National Road) between 1926 and 1930. In 1958, SR 0081 was assigned upon beginning of the construction of Interstate 81.

== PA 83 ==
Pennsylvania Route 83
- Location: Wyola–Connor
- Length: 71 mi (114 km)
- Existed: 1928–1961

Pennsylvania Route 83 was a 71-mile-long (114 km) east–west state highway located in east central Pennsylvania. The original eastern terminus of the route was at Pennsylvania Route 252 in Wyola. The western terminus was at U.S. Route 122 (originally U.S. Route 120), locally called Connor or Connor's Crossing, between Cressona and Schuylkill Haven in North Manheim Township.

In 1961 the route was split and renumbered to avoid duplication with Interstate 83. The route is now Pennsylvania Route 183 from Reading to Connor and Pennsylvania Route 724 from approximately Interstate 176 in Ridgewood (southeast of Reading) to Pennsylvania Route 23 near Phoenixville. The section from Reading to Ridgewood was downgraded to local roads. The section between Wyola and PA 23 reverted to local roads as well, though the segment between PA 23 and Swedesford Road north of Devon is now part of a realigned PA 252.

== PA 84 ==
Pennsylvania Route 84
- Location: Piatt Township–Wells Township
- Length: 68 mi (109 km)
- Existed: 1928–1961

Pennsylvania Route 84 was a 64-mile-long (103 km) north–south state highway located in northern central Pennsylvania. The southern terminus of the route was at U.S. Route 220 in the Piatt Township hamlet of Larrys Creek. The northern terminus was at Pennsylvania Route 549 a half-mile south of the New York-Pennsylvania border in Wells Township.

The route is now Pennsylvania Route 287 from Larrys Creek to U.S. Route 15 northeast of Tioga and Pennsylvania Route 328 from US 15 to PA 549.

== PA 90 ==
Pennsylvania Route 90
- Location: Easton–Hancock, New York
- Existed: 1928–1961

Pennsylvania Route 90 was the designation for Sullivan Trail between Easton and Stockertown (concurrent with PA 115) and PA 191 between Stockertown and Hancock, New York.

== PA 91 ==
Pennsylvania Route 91
- Location: Honesdale–West Damascus
- Length: 11 mi (18 km)
- Existed: 1936–1946

Pennsylvania Route 91 was an 11-mile-long (18 km) state highway located in Wayne County. The southern terminus was at US 6/US 106 in Honesdale. The northern terminus was at PA 371 in West Damascus. No state route replaced the road.

Browse numbered routes
← I-90	PA	→ PA 92

== PA 95 ==
Pennsylvania Route 95
- Location: Centre Hall–Lewisburg
- Existed: 1928–1961

Pennsylvania Route 95 was the designation for what is now PA 192.

== PA 101 ==
Pennsylvania Route 101
- Location: Bristol–South Langhorne
- Length: 5 mi (8.0 km)
- Existed: 1928–1946

Pennsylvania Route 101 was a 5-mile-long (8.0 km) state highway located in Bucks County. The southern terminus was at US 13 in Bristol. The northern terminus was at US 1 in South Langhorne. The route was replaced with PA 413.

== PA 105 ==
Pennsylvania Route 105
- Location: Havertown–Ardmore
- Length: 2 mi (3.2 km)
- Existed: 1928–1946

Pennsylvania Route 105 in Delaware County ran from PA 3 in Havertown to US 30/former PA 201 in Ardmore. It was decommissioned in 1946 and renumbered as quadrant SR 1005.

== PA 112 ==
Pennsylvania Route 112
- Location: Markham–Tanguy
- Length: 4.75 mi (7.64 km)
- Existed: 1928–1946

Pennsylvania Route 112 was the former designation for Cheyney Road from 1928 to 1946.

== PA 118 ==
Pennsylvania Route 118
- Location: Hookstown–Shippingport
- Existed: 1928–1946

The original Pennsylvania Route 118 was located in Beaver County and ran from Pine Street in Hookstown to PA 18 (Frankfort Road) near Shippingport. The route was designated in 1928 and decommissioned in 1946. The old segment from Pine Street to Cooks Ferry became a realignment of PA 168 in 1951. Cooks Ferry was used to cross the Ohio River and join PA 168 northbound in Midland until 1964 when it was replaced by the Shippingport Bridge.

PA 118 was reactivated to its current northeastern Pennsylvania location in 1967.

== PA 121 ==
Pennsylvania Route 121
- Location: Point Marion–East Waynesburg
- Length: 20.8 mi (33.5 km)
- Existed: 1928–1950

The original Pennsylvania Route 121 ran entirely in Greene County from the WV/PA state line near Point Marion to PA 21 in East Waynesburg. The route was decommissioned in 1950 and the number was reactivated in 1961 to its current location in Allegheny County.

== PA 123 ==
Pennsylvania Route 123
- Location: Gulph–Bridgeport
- Length: 4 mi (6.4 km)
- Existed: 1928–1946

Pennsylvania Route 123 was a 4-mile-long (6.4 km) state highway located in Montgomery County. The southern terminus was at PA 23 in Gulph and the northern terminus was at US 202 in Bridgeport. PA 123 was decommissioned in 1946 and was not renumbered.

Browse numbered routes
← US 122	PA	→ PA 124

== PA 126 ==
Pennsylvania Route 126
- Location: Warfordsburg–Breezewood
- Length: 23 mi (37 km)
- Existed: 1928–1964

Pennsylvania Route 126 was a 23-mile-long (37 km) state highway located in Fulton and Bedford Counties, running from US 522 in Warfordsburg to US 30 in Breezewood. In 1963, PA 126 was moved to run concurrently with the recently opened segment of I-70 that paralleled the old road. The following year, I-70 became the sole designation as PA 126 was decommissioned.

== PA 129 ==
Pennsylvania Route 129
- Location: Markham–Gradyville
- Length: 5 mi (8.0 km)
- Existed: 1928–1946

Pennsylvania Route 129 in Delaware County was a 5-mile (8.0 km) route, running from US 202 in Markham to PA 352 in Gradyville. It was decommissioned in 1946 and not renumbered or reassigned to any other routes.

Browse numbered routes
← PA 128	PA	→ PA 130

== PA 131 ==
Pennsylvania Route 131
- Location: New Buena Vista–Schellsburg
- Length: 3 mi (4.8 km)
- Existed: 1928–1946

Pennsylvania Route 131 was a 3-mile-long (4.8 km) state highway located in Bedford county in Pennsylvania. The southern terminus was at PA 31 in New Buena Vista. The northern terminus was at US 30 near Schellsburg. It was not replaced by any route.

Browse numbered routes
← PA 130	PA	→ PA 132

== PA 133 ==
Pennsylvania Route 133
- Location: Port Carbon–St. Clair
- Length: 2 mi (3.2 km)
- Existed: 1928–1946

Pennsylvania Route 133 was a 2-mile-long (3.2 km) state highway located in Schuylkill county in Pennsylvania. The southern terminus was at US 209 in Port Carbon. The northern terminus was at US 122 in St. Clair. It was not replaced by any route.

Browse numbered routes
← PA 132	PA	→ PA 134

== PA 135 ==
Pennsylvania Route 135
- Location: Thompsontown–Cocolamus
- Length: 7 mi (11 km)
- Existed: 1928–1946

Pennsylvania Route 135 was a 7-mile-long (11 km) state highway located in Juniata county in Pennsylvania. The southern terminus was at US 22/US 322 in Thompsontown. The northern terminus was at PA 35 near Cocolamus. It was not replaced by any route.

Browse numbered routes
← PA 134	PA	→ PA 136

== PA 137 ==
Pennsylvania Route 137
- Location: Greeley–Shohola
- Existed: 1928–1946

Pennsylvania Route 137 was the designation for what became PA 37 (now PA 434) between Greeley and Shohola.

== PA 139 ==
Pennsylvania Route 139
- Location: West Nanticoke–Silkworth
- Length: 8 mi (13 km)
- Existed: 1928–1946

Pennsylvania Route 139 was a 8-mile-long (13 km) state highway located in Luzerne county in Pennsylvania. The southern terminus was at US 11 in West Nanticoke. The northern terminus was at PA Route 29 in Silkworth. It was replaced by PA 29.

== PA 141 ==
Pennsylvania Route 141
- Location: Marietta–Mount Joy
- Length: 4 mi (6.4 km)
- Existed: 1928–1984

Pennsylvania Route 141 was a 4-mile-long (6.4 km) state highway located in Lancaster county in Pennsylvania. The southern terminus was at PA 441 in Marietta. The northern terminus was at PA 230 in Mount Joy. It was replaced by PA 772.

== PA 142 ==
Pennsylvania Route 142
- Location: Frackville–Zions Grove
- Length: 14 mi (23 km)
- Existed: 1928–1946

Pennsylvania Route 142 was a 14-mile-long (23 km) state highway located in Schuylkill county in Pennsylvania. The southern terminus was at US 122 in Frackville. The northern terminus was at PA 44 in Zions Grove. Part of the route was replaced by PA 924, while the other part was not replaced by any route.

Browse numbered routes
← PA 141	PA	→ PA 143

== PA 149 ==
Pennsylvania Route 149
- Location: Knoxville–Austinburg
- Length: 4 mi (6.4 km)
- Existed: 1928–1946

Pennsylvania Route 149 was a 4-mile-long (6.4 km) state highway located in Tioga county in Pennsylvania. The southern terminus was at PA 49 in Knoxville. The northern terminus was the New York state line near Austinburg. It was replaced by PA 249.

== PA 159 ==
Pennsylvania Route 159
- Location: Cornplanter–Corydon
- Length: 10 mi (16 km)
- Existed: 1928–1946

Pennsylvania Route 159 was a 10-mile-long (16 km) state highway located in Warren county in Pennsylvania. The southern terminus was at PA 59 in Cornplanter. The northern terminus was the New York state line in Corydon. It was replaced by PA 346.

== PA 161 ==
Pennsylvania Route 161
- Location: Linwood–Chelsea
- Length: 4 mi (6.4 km)
- Existed: 1928–1954

Pennsylvania Route 161 was a 4-mile-long (6.4 km) state highway that ran along Chichester Avenue in Delaware County, Pennsylvania. The southern terminus was at PA 452 in Linwood. The northern terminus was at US 322 in Chelsea. It was not replaced by any route.

Browse numbered routes
← PA 160	PA	→ PA 162

== PA 163 ==
Pennsylvania Route 163
- Location: Willow Grove–Bethayres
- Existed: 1928–1940s

Pennsylvania Route 163 is the former designation for Edge Hill Road and Terwood Road, running from PA 63 in Willow Grove east to PA 63 in Bethayres in Montgomery County. The route was first designated in 1928 to run from PA 73 in Philadelphia north to PA 63/PA 232 in Bethayres. In 1937, PA 163 was redesignated onto Edge Hill and Terwood roads between Willow Grove and Bethayres, with PA 232 extended south along the former alignment between Philadelphia and Bethayres. The PA 163 designation was removed in the 1940s.

== PA 171 (1928–1946) ==
Pennsylvania Route 171
- Location: Westmoreland County
- Length: 2.2 mi (3.5 km)
- Existed: 1928–1946

The original Pennsylvania Route 171 was situated along Fells Church Road, running from PA 51 to former PA 71 (now PA 201) in Rostraver Township, Westmoreland County. PA 171 was decommissioned in 1946 and reactivated in 1961 to its current alignment in Northeastern Pennsylvania.

== PA 172 ==
Pennsylvania Route 172
- Location: Wrightsdale–Unicorn
- Length: 8 mi (13 km)
- Existed: 1928–1946

Pennsylvania Route 172 was an 8-mile-long (13 km) state highway located in Lancaster county in Pennsylvania. The southern terminus was at US 222 near Wrightsdale. The northern terminus was at US 222 in Unicorn. It was not replaced by any route. Today it is signed as Little Britain Road.

Browse numbered routes
← PA 171	PA	→ PA 173

== PA 176 ==
Pennsylvania Route 176
- Location: Fort Littleton–Orbisonia
- Length: 20 mi (32 km)
- Existed: 1928–1964

Pennsylvania Route 176 was a 20-mile-long (32 km) state highway located in Fulton and Huntingdon counties in Pennsylvania. The southern terminus was at US 522 near Fort Littleton. The northern terminus was at US 522 in Orbisonia. It was replaced by PA 475.

== PA 178 ==
Pennsylvania Route 178
- Location: Concord Township–Union City
- Length: 8 mi (13 km)
- Existed: 1961–1983

Pennsylvania Route 178 was the designation for what is now State Route 2010, a Quadrant Route located in southeastern Erie County, Pennsylvania. The southern terminus of the route is at Pennsylvania Route 89 in the Concord Township hamlet of Concord Corners. The northern terminus is at U.S. Route 6 and Pennsylvania Route 8 in Union City. PA 178, designated in 1961 to replace PA 79, was decommissioned in 1983.

Browse numbered routes
← I-178	PA	→ I-179

== PA 180 ==
Pennsylvania Route 180
- Location: Penn Hills–Kregar
- Length: 40 mi (64 km)
- Existed: 1928–1961

Pennsylvania Route 180 was a 40-mile-long (64 km) state highway located in Allegheny and Westmoreland counties in Pennsylvania. The western terminus was at PA 380 in Penn Hills. The eastern terminus was at PA 381 near Kregar. In 1961, the route was renumbered PA 130.

== PA 181 ==
Pennsylvania Route 181
- Location: Addison Township
- Length: 3.2 mi (5.1 km)
- Existed: 1928–1946

The original Pennsylvania Route 181 ran for approximately 3 miles along the Somerset County side of the Youghiogheny River from the MD/PA state line to U.S. 40 in Addison Township. In 1944, the Youghiogheny River Lake by formed by damming its river upstream in nearby Confluence. This widened the river from Confluence to the state line, sinking the designated PA 181 road in the process and calling for its decommissioning by 1946. PA 181 was reactivated and assigned to its current York County alignment in 1961.

== PA 186 ==
Pennsylvania Route 186
- Location: Penn Hills–Turtle Creek
- Length: 4.0 mi (6.4 km)
- Existed: 1936–1941

In 1936, the segment of PA 180 in Allegheny County from its western terminus at PA 80 (now PA 380) in Penn Hills to Tri-Boro Avenue (now Tri-Boro Expressway) in Turtle Creek was renumbered Pennsylvania Route 186. Five years later, PA 186 was decommissioned and renumbered back to PA 180.

== PA 189 ==
Pennsylvania Route 189
- Location: Corry–Wayne Township
- Length: 5.0 mi (8.0 km)
- Existed: 1930–1946

Pennsylvania Route 189 in Erie County (a/k/a Hare Creek Road) was the designation for what became an alignment of PA 426 (southern segment) from U.S. 6 in Corry to the PA/NY state line in Wayne Township.

== PA 199 ==
Pennsylvania Route 199
- Location: Millcreek Township
- Length: 0.9 mi (1,400 m)
- Existed: 1928–1964

The original Pennsylvania Route 199 was the designation for the segment of Asbury Road from US 20 north to the intersection of PA 5 and PA 5 Alt. in Millcreek Township, Erie County just outside Erie. The route was first designated in 1928 between US 20 and PA 99 (now PA 5) along an unpaved road. The entire length of PA 199 was paved in the 1930s. PA 199 was decommissioned in the 1960s and reactivated in 1974 to its current alignment in Bradford County.

== PA 202 ==
Pennsylvania Route 202
- Location: Wind Gap–Bangor
- Existed: 1928–1932

Pennsylvania Route 202 was the designation for what became PA 702 (now PA 512) between Wind Gap and Bangor.

== PA 215 ==
Pennsylvania Route 215
- Location: Tobyhanna Township-Dupont
- Length: 20.0 mi (32.2 km)
- Existed: 1928–1946

The original Pennsylvania Route 215 ran from PA 940 in Tobyhanna Township/Monroe County to PA 315 in Dupont/Luzerne County. PA 215 was decommissioned in 1946 and reactivated in 1962 to its current alignment in Erie County.

== PA 218 ==
Pennsylvania Route 218
- Location: West Middlesex–New Wilmington
- Length: 9.0 mi (14.5 km)
- Existed: 1928–1929

The original Pennsylvania Route 218 was a short-lived Lawrence/Mercer County route that ran from the intersection of PA 18 and PA 318 West Middlesex to PA 18 in New Wilmington. Less than a year after its commissioning, the entire route was decommissioned and renumbered as PA 278 (described below). PA 218 was reactivated in 1936 to its current 13-mile alignment in Greene County.

== PA 221 ==
Pennsylvania Route 221
- Location: Dunkard Township
- Length: 1.5 mi (2.4 km)
- Existed: 1930 or earlier–1946

Before the current Pennsylvania Route 221 was commissioned in 1936, a short 1 1/2-mile segment between then-PA 121 and PA 88 in Dunkard Township/Greene County was originally assigned that route number as early as 1930. From 1936 to the original route's decommissioning in 1946, there were two separate PA 221 designations with a gap of 21 miles between them. The decommissioned segment is now known as Holbert Stretch Road.

== PA 223 (1930s) ==
Pennsylvania Route 223
- Location: Montgomery County
- Existed: 1936–1941

The original Pennsylvania Route 223 was commissioned in 1936 as a short route that ran between PA 23 through Valley Forge National Historical Park in Montgomery County. The route was marked as Gulph Road and was decommissioned in 1941 when its alignment was redesignated as PA 23. The former route is designated today as SR 3031 and SR 1012.

== PA 223 (1960s) ==
Pennsylvania Route 223
- Location: Indiana County
- Length: 23.0 mi (37.0 km)
- Existed: 1961–1965

Pennsylvania Route 223 was reactivated in 1961 and ran on the former PA 480 alignment from US 422 in Strongstown to US 119 in Marion Center. The route was decommissioned in 1965, and parts of the route run today on PA 403 and PA 553.

== PA 229 ==
Pennsylvania Route 229
- Location: Emmaus–Wennersville
- Existed: 1928–1940s

Pennsylvania Route 229 was the designation for Cedar Crest Boulevard between Walbert Avenue (US 309/PA 29) in Wennersville and Chestnut Street (PA 29) in Emmaus.

== PA 237 ==
Pennsylvania Route 237
- Location: Lackawaxen–Shohola Township
- Length: 3.88 mi (6.24 km)
- Existed: 1928–1946

Pennsylvania Route 237 ran from PA 37 and PA 590 in Lackawaxen to PA 137 (now PA 434) in Shohola Township from 1928 to 1946.

== PA 245 ==
Pennsylvania Route 245
- Location: Slatington–Berlinsville
- Length: 2.10 mi (3.38 km)
- Existed: 1928–1946

Pennsylvania Route 245 (PA 245) ran from US 309 in Slatington and PA 45 in Berlinsville between 1928 and 1946.

== PA 256 ==
Pennsylvania Route 256
- Location: Leechburg
- Length: 1.0 mi (1.6 km)
- Existed: 1929–1946

The one-mile Pennsylvania Route 256 in Westmoreland County ran from PA 56 to PA 66 in Leechburg.

Browse numbered routes
← PA 255	PA	→ PA 257

== PA 260 ==
Pennsylvania Route 260
- Location: Johnstown–Berlinsville
- Length: 5.0 mi (8.0 km)
- Existed: 1928–1960

Pennsylvania Route 260 in Cambria County ran from PA 403 in Johnstown to a former alignment of U.S. 219 in Jackson Township; it was renumbered in 1960 as an extended alignment of PA 271.

== PA 266 ==
Pennsylvania Route 266
- Location: Morrisville–Smithfield
- Length: 24.0 mi (38.6 km)
- Existed: 1928–1955

Pennsylvania Route 266 started out as a 5 1/2-mile route in Fayette County, running from PA 166 near New Geneva to U.S. 119 in Smithfield. In 1950, the original PA Route 121 across the Monongahela River in Greene County was decommissioned and the segment from PA 88 in Greensboro to PA 21 in East Waynesburg was renumbered PA 266. As a result, a ferry was provided as a connector for the two designations across the Monongahela between Greensboro and New Geneva. PA 266 was decommissioned in 1955 and the route was not renumbered or realigned with any other active routes.

Browse numbered routes
← PA 264	PA	→ PA 267

== PA 276 ==
Pennsylvania Route 276
- Location: Three Springs–Mount Union
- Existed: 1928–1964

Pennsylvania Route 276 ran from PA 76 (now PA 655) south of Three Springs north to US 522 in Mount Union in Huntingdon County. The designation was decommissioned in 1964 and replaced with part of PA 994 between PA 655 and Three Springs and PA 747 between Three Springs and Mount Union due to the designation of I-276 in Pennsylvania.

Browse numbered routes
← I-276	PA	→ PA 277

== PA 278 ==
Pennsylvania Route 278
- Location: Pulaski Township–Washington Township
- Length: 17.0 mi (27.4 km)
- Existed: 1929–1959

Pennsylvania Route 278 was originally designated in 1928 as PA 218, a 9-mile "L-shaped" Mercer/Lawrence County route that ran from the intersection of PA 18 and PA 318 in West Middlesex to PA 18 in New Wilmington. Shortly after its renumbering to PA 278 the following year, the eastern terminus was extended to U.S. 19 in Washington Township. In 1936, the western terminus was moved to U.S. 422 in Pulaski Township near the PA/OH state line, thus situating the route entirely in Lawrence County; the former segment from West Middlesex from Pulaski Township was renumbered as an alignment of PA 551. In 1959, PA 278 was decommissioned and the segment from its western terminus to PA 168 was renumbered as a realignment of current PA 208. The remaining eastern segment from PA 168 to U.S. 19 was not renumbered.

== PA 280 ==
Pennsylvania Route 280
- Location: Wilkins Township–Penn Hills
- Length: 3.6 mi (5.8 km)
- Existed: 1928–1946

Pennsylvania Route 280 in Allegheny County ran entirely along Rodi Road from Thompson Run Road (formerly PA 503) in Wilkins Township to its northern terminus at former PA 80 (now PA 380) in Penn Hills from 1928 to its decommissioning in 1946. In 1963, the 2.10-mile segment from US 22 Business in Churchill to said northern terminus was assigned its current route, PA 791.

== PA 319 ==
Pennsylvania Route 319
- Location: Lake Lynn–Hopwood
- Length: 12.0 mi (19.3 km)
- Existed: 1936–1946

Pennsylvania Route 319 in Fayette County ran from the WV/PA state line in Lake Lynn to U.S. 40 in Hopwood. It was decommissioned in 1946 and the southern portion was reassigned in 1967 as its current designation of PA 857.

Browse numbered routes
← PA 318	PA	→ PA 320

== PA 336 ==
Pennsylvania Route 336
- Location: Glen Campbell–Rossiter
- Length: 12.0 mi (19.3 km)
- Existed: 1928–1984

Pennsylvania Route 336 ran from PA 286 in Glen Campbell/Indiana County to former PA 236 near Rossiter/Jefferson County. It was one of the longer lasting former routes, having been decommissioned in 1984 and separated into four quadrant state routes.

Browse numbered routes
← PA 335	PA	→ PA 337

== PA 337 ==
Pennsylvania Route 337
- Location: Tidioute–Warren
- Length: 22.0 mi (35.4 km)
- Existed: 1936–1984

Pennsylvania Route 337 was the designation for what is now State Route 3005 running for 22 miles from its southern terminus US Route 62 in Tidioute to its northern terminus at US Route 62/US Route 6 in Warren, Pennsylvania. It serves as a primary rural road serving the Allegheny National Forest. It was superseded by the nearby US 62.

Although the designation and signs were officially removed in 1984, the road retains Route 337 on its road signs from the terminus at Tidioute to the Hearts Content section of the Allegheny National Forest. A small shield can be found (although in the shield shape of a US Route) where it marks its former designation at the southern terminus at Tidioute.

Browse numbered routes
← PA 336	PA	→ PA 338

== PA 359 ==
Pennsylvania Route 359
- Location: Kiskieminetas Township-Manor Township
- Length: 16.0 mi (25.7 km)
- Existed: 1936–1981

Pennsylvania Route 359 in Armstrong County ran from PA 56 in Kiskiminetas Township to PA 66 in Manor Township. It was one of the longer lasting former routes, having been decommissioned in 1981 and reassigned as SR 2025.

Browse numbered routes
← PA 358	PA	→ PA 360

== PA 451 ==
Pennsylvania Route 451
- Location: New Galilee-Koppel
- Length: 4 mi (6.4 km)
- Existed: 1928–1936

Pennsylvania Route 451 ran along the northern edge of Beaver Country from the then-eastern terminus of PA 351 to PA 18 in Koppel. In 1936, PA 351 extended its eastern segment with the decommissioning of PA 451 and the opening of the last segment from Koppel to its current terminus at PA 65/PA 288 in Ellwood City.

== PA 458 ==
Pennsylvania Route 458
- Location: Greene Township-Jamestown
- Length: 3 mi (4.8 km)
- Existed: 1930–1946

Pennsylvania Route 458 in Mercer County started at the intersection of PA 322 and PA 58's then-western terminus in Jamestown (near the Mercer/Crawford County line) and ran for three miles westbound to the Ohio/Pennsylvania state line in Greene Township. In 1946, PA 458 was decommissioned and became the westernmost segment of PA 58.

== PA 466 ==
Pennsylvania Route 466
- Location: Allegheny Township-Washington Township
- Length: 5 mi (8.0 km)
- Existed: 1928–1946

Pennsylvania Route 466 was a Westmoreland County route that ran from PA 56/PA 356 in Allegheny Township to PA 66 in Washington Township. It was decommissioned and renumbered in 1946, extending PA 356 to its current southern terminus.

== PA 503 ==
Pennsylvania Route 503
- Location: Turtle Creek-Penn Hills
- Length: 6.0 mi (9.7 km)
- Existed: 1928–1946

Pennsylvania Route 503 was a 6-mile Allegheny County route that ran from former PA 180 (which became concurrent with PA 993 in 1941 and is now solely PA 130) in Turtle Creek to former PA 80 (now PA 380) in Penn Hills.

Browse numbered routes
← PA 502	PA	→ PA 504

== PA 527 ==
Pennsylvania Route 527
- Location: Harmony Township
- Length: 1.0 mi (1.6 km)
- Existed: 1928–1946

Pennsylvania Route 527 in Forest County was first signed in Pleasantville. Two years later, it was moved east near the Allegheny River, running along Preacher Hill Road from McArthur Run Road to PA 127 (Fleming Hill Road) in Harmony Township.

Browse numbered routes
← PA 524	PA	→ PA 528

== PA 543 ==
Pennsylvania Route 543
- Location: Paxtang–Linglestown
- Length: 5.23 mi (8.42 km)
- Existed: 1928–1955

Pennsylvania Route 543 was the designation for Progress Avenue between US 22 in Paxtang and PA 39 in Linglestown between 1928 and 1955. The route is now SR 3015.

== PA 566 ==
Pennsylvania Route 566
- Location: North Vandergrift-Bethel Township
- Length: 8.0 mi (12.9 km)
- Existed: 1928–1938

Pennsylvania Route 566 ran through Armstrong County from the intersection of the PA 56/PA 66 concurrency/split in North Vandergrift to PA 66 in Bethel Township. In 1938, PA 566 was replaced with its current designation of Alternate PA 66 which was then extended into Westmoreland County to the current southern terminus at its parent route in Washington Township.

== PA 582 ==
Pennsylvania Route 582
- Location: Blairsville-Black Lick
- Length: 5.0 mi (8.0 km)
- Existed: 1930–1946

Pennsylvania Route 582 in Indiana County ran from U.S. 22/U.S. 119 in Blairsville to U.S. 119 in Black Lick.

Browse numbered routes
← PA 581	PA	→ PA 588

== PA 602 ==
Pennsylvania Route 602
- Location: Hallstead
- Existed: 1928–1946

Pennsylvania Route 602 in Susquehanna County ran from U.S. 11 in Hallstead to the PA/NY state line six miles north. This was renumbered in 1946 as a realignment of PA 70. When PA 70 was renumbered PA 171 in 1961, the northern terminus was truncated from the state line to its current location at I-81 in Great Bend. The decommissioned segment, which was the former PA 602, was renumbered as Quadrant SR 1033.

== PA 651 ==
Pennsylvania Route 651
- Location: Darlington Township-Homewood
- Length: 12.0 mi (19.3 km)
- Existed: 1928–1946

Pennsylvania Route 651 in Beaver County started at the OH/PA state line in Darlington Township and ran eastbound through Darlington Borough, back into the township of the same name, Big Beaver and to its eastern terminus at PA 18 in Homewood.

In 1936, PA 168 was extended northbound from its previous terminus in Beaver. As a result, 1.2 miles of its new designation ran concurrently with PA 651 from Market Street in Darlington Borough to Ashwood Road in Big Beaver.

Browse numbered routes
← PA 647	PA	→ PA 652

== PA 672 ==
Pennsylvania Route 672
- Location: Lancaster–Manheim
- Length: 9 mi (14 km)
- Existed: 1929–1946

Pennsylvania Route 672 was a 9-mile-long (14 km) state highway located in Lancaster County, Pennsylvania. The southern terminus was at PA 72 in Lancaster. The northern terminus was at PA 72 in Manheim. The road is now known as its name, Fruitville Pike, and is designated as State Route 4011, an unsigned quadrant route.

Browse numbered routes
← PA 670	PA	→ I-676

== PA 680 ==
Pennsylvania Route 680
- Location: Unity Township–Black Lick Township
- Length: 21.5 mi (34.6 km)
- Existed: 1930–1961

Pennsylvania Route 680 was the original designation of current PA 217. PA 680 originally terminated southbound at U.S. 22 in Blairsville/Indiana County; it was extended in 1936 to its current southern terminus at U.S. 30 on the border of Unity and Derry Townships in Westmoreland County. In 1961, PA 680 was renumbered as PA 217 to avoid numerical duplication with I-680 in Philadelphia. Despite this, I-680 was changed to I-676 in 1964 when its parent I-80S (Pennsylvania Turnpike) was changed to I-76.

== PA 692 ==
Pennsylvania Route 692
- Location: Oakland–Great Bend
- Existed: 1928–1946

Pennsylvania Route 692 was the designation for what became PA 70 (now PA 171) between Oakland and Great Bend.

== PA 702 ==
Pennsylvania Route 702
- Location: Wind Gap–Bangor
- Existed: 1932–1946

Pennsylvania Route 702 was the designation for what became PA 512 between Wind Gap and Bangor.

== PA 709 ==
Pennsylvania Route 709
- Location: Riverton-Martins Creek
- Existed: 1940–1946

Pennsylvania Route 709 was the designation for the road linking the Riverton–Belvidere Bridge in Riverton to US 611 east of Martins Creek.

== PA 746 ==
Pennsylvania Route 746
- Location: Aiken–Rew
- Existed: 1930–1946

Pennsylvania Route 746 was the designation for what became PA 646 between Aiken and Rew.

== PA 752 ==
Pennsylvania Route 752
- Location: Horsham
- Length: 1.8 mi (2.9 km)
- Existed: 1930–1940

Pennsylvania Route 752 was a state highway located in Montgomery County, Pennsylvania. The route connected PA 63 to US 611 in Horsham between 1930 and 1940. The route is today known as Dresher Road.

== PA 763 ==
Pennsylvania Route 763
- Location: Hatboro–Lower Moreland Township
- Existed: 1930–1940

Pennsylvania Route 763 was a route that ran from PA 263 in Hatboro southeast to PA 232 in Lower Moreland Township in Montgomery County, following Byberry Road. It was created by 1930 with the designation removed by 1940.

Browse numbered routes
← PA 760	PA	→ PA 764

== PA 766 ==
Pennsylvania Route 766
- Location: Greensburg-Jeannette
- Existed: 1930–1946

Running entirely in Westmoreland County, Pennsylvania Route 766 was designated on the entire stretch of Oakford Park Road. Its southern terminus was at former PA 180 (now PA 130, Harrison Avenue) in Jeannette and its northern terminus at former PA 66 (now Business PA 66, Sheridan Road) in Greensburg.

Browse numbered routes
← PA 764	PA	→ PA 770

== PA 780 ==
Pennsylvania Route 780
- Location: Lamar-Loganton
- Length: 15.1 mi (24.3 km)
- Existed: 1930–1967

Pennsylvania Route 780 was one of the few state numbers to have two active routes in two different counties at the same time. The original PA 780 was commissioned in 1930; it was located in Clinton County and ran from a segment of U.S. 220 that was later "swapped" with parallel PA 64 in Lamar to PA 880 in Loganton. Six years later, PA 780's second (and currently active) designation was assigned in Westmoreland County. After the original PA 780 was decommissioned in 1967, the segment from the eastern terminus at North Mill Road to Narrows Road was renumbered as a realignment of PA 880.

== PA 790 ==
Pennsylvania Route 790
- Location: Hemlock Grove–Greentown
- Length: 1.62 mi< (2.61 km)
- Existed: 1930–1946

Pennsylvania Route 790 ran from PA 290 near Hemlock Grove to PA 507 in Greentown between 1930 and 1946.

== PA 802 ==
Pennsylvania Route 802
- Location: Heidelberg–Pittsburgh/West End
- Length: 5.7 mi (9.2 km)
- Existed: 1940–1946

Pennsylvania Route 802 in Allegheny County ran from the former concurrency of PA 28/PA 519 (now PA 50, Washington Avenue) in Heidelberg to the former multiple concurrency of US 19/US 22/US 30/PA 28/PA 51/PA 88 (now PA 60, South Main Street) in the West End neighborhood of Pittsburgh. In 1961, with the opening of a new interchange to the Penn Lincoln Parkway in Green Tree, the former PA 802 segment from the intersection of Greentree and Cochran Roads to the intersection of Greentree Road and Mansfield Avenue was reassigned as a part of the new PA 121, having been decommissioned from its original route in 1950.

Browse numbered routes
← PA 796	PA	→ PA 805

== PA 805 ==
Pennsylvania Route 805
- Location: Millvale-Pittsburgh
- Length: 7.0 mi (11.3 km)
- Existed: 1940–1946

Pennsylvania Route 805 in Allegheny County was a "horseshoe" route that began and ended at two different points of former PA 8/PA 28 (now solely PA 28). From the northern terminus, PA 805 ran up through Millvale, Shaler Township and Ross Township, then wound back down through the Pittsburgh neighborhoods of Summer Hill, Northview Heights, Spring Hill/City View and East Allegheny to its southern terminus.

Browse numbered routes
← PA 802	PA	→ PA 808

== PA 808 ==
Pennsylvania Route 808
- Location: Sharpsburg-O'Hara Township
- Length: 2.0 mi (3.2 km)
- Existed: 1940–1946

Pennsylvania Route 808 in Allegheny County ran for 2 short miles from the original PA 28 (Main Street) in Sharpsburg to former PA 836 (Dorseyville Road) in O'Hara Township.

Browse numbered routes
← PA 805	PA	→ PA 813

== PA 823 ==
Pennsylvania Route 823
- Location: Big Shanty–Lewis Run
- Length: 3.47 mi (5.58 km)
- Existed: 1929–1932

Pennsylvania Route 823 ran from Big Shanty to US 219 in Lewis Run between 1929 and 1932.

== PA 825 ==
Pennsylvania Route 825
- Location: Janesville
- Existed: 1930s–early 1940s

Pennsylvania Route 825 was the designation for what became PA 729 in Janesville.

== PA 835 ==
Pennsylvania Route 835
- Location: Hampton Township-West Deer Township
- Length: 4.0 mi (6.4 km)
- Existed: 1928–1946

Pennsylvania Route 835 in Allegheny County ran from PA 8 in Hampton Township to PA 910 in West Deer Township.

Browse numbered routes
← PA 834	PA	→ PA 836

== PA 836 ==
Pennsylvania Route 836
- Location: Indiana Township-Hampton Township
- Length: 14.0 mi (22.5 km)
- Existed: 1928–1946

Pennsylvania Route 836 in Allegheny County was a "U-shaped" route located in Pittsburgh's North Hills. Beginning on Saxonburg Boulevard at PA 910 in Indiana Township, the route ran south through Fox Chapel, O'Hara Township, Shaler Township and Etna. Crossing over PA 8 in Etna, PA 836 continued northbound back into Shaler Township and ran concurrently with Mount Royal Boulevard to its northern terminus at PA 8 in Hampton Township.

Browse numbered routes
← PA 835	PA	→ PA 837

== PA 844 ==
Pennsylvania Route 844
- Location: Saltsburg
- Length: 6.4 mi (10.3 km)
- Existed: 1928–1946

The original Pennsylvania Route 844 was located in Indiana County and ran from former PA 80 (now PA 286) to West Lebanon Road in Saltsburg. It was decommissioned in 1946 and the route number was reactivated to its current Washington County location in 1964.

== PA 854 ==
Pennsylvania Route 854
- Location: Leatherwood-Elk City
- Length: 20.0 mi (32.2 km)
- Existed: 1928–1984

Pennsylvania Route 854 in Clarion County ran from PA 861 in Leatherwood to U.S. 322 near Elk City. It was one of the longer lasting former routes, having been decommissioned in 1984.

Browse numbered routes
← PA 853	PA	→ PA 855

== PA 855 ==
Pennsylvania Route 855
- Location: Mars–Evans City
- Length: 6 mi (9.7 km)
- Existed: 1928–1946

Pennsylvania Route 855 in Butler County ran from the borough of Mars to PA 68 in Evans City. It was decommissioned in 1946 and later assigned as quadrant SR 3015 (Mars-Evans City Road).

A local attraction along this route was feeding tame fish in a small pond near a gas station in Callery.

Browse numbered routes
← PA 854	PA	→ PA 856

== PA 856 ==
Pennsylvania Route 856
- Location: Freedom–Emsworth
- Existed: 1928–1976

Pennsylvania Route 856 (PA 856) was a state route that ran from PA 65 in Freedom in Beaver County southeast to another intersection with PA 65 in Emsworth in Allegheny County. PA 856 headed east from PA 65 in Freedom and had an intersection with PA 989 before it left Beaver County for Allegheny County. At this point, the route curved southeast and then south before it passed through Franklin Park. PA 856 continued south to its end at PA 65 in Emsworth.

The route was designated in 1928 to run from PA 857 (now PA 65) in Freedom east to Knob along an unpaved road. PA 856 was paved by 1930. In the 1930s, the route was extended from Knob southeast to PA 88 (now PA 65) in Emsworth, with a portion of road north of Emsworth replacing PA 989. PA 856 was decommissioned in 1976 due to the completion of the parallel I-79 in the area. The state continued to maintain the former alignment of PA 856. Two years after the route was decommissioned, local residents complained about lack of snow removal and felt that PennDOT had abandoned the road when they removed the PA 856 designation. However, the state reminded the residents that they still maintain the road and that snow removal along the former route was secondary to more important routes, in addition to suggesting local municipalities can take over snow removal.

Browse numbered routes
← PA 855	PA	→ PA 857

== PA 862 ==
Pennsylvania Route 862
- Location: Pine Township-Boggs Township
- Length: 7.0 mi (11.3 km)
- Existed: 1928–1946

Pennsylvania Route 862 in Armstrong County ran from Pine Township's unincorporated community of Templeton to PA 28/PA 66 in Boggs Township.

Browse numbered routes
← PA 861	PA	→ PA 863

== PA 877 ==
Pennsylvania Route 877
- Location: Lower Turkeyfoot Township
- Length: 3.0 mi (4.8 km)
- Existed: 1928–1946

Pennsylvania Route 877 in Lower Turkeyfoot Township/Somerset County ran from a former alignment of PA 53 (now PA 281) to an unmarked road.

Browse numbered routes
← PA 876	PA	→ PA 879

== PA 881 ==
Pennsylvania Route 881
- Location: Versailles-East Pittsburgh
- Length: 3.5 mi (5.6 km)
- Existed: 1928–1946

PA Routes 881-886 were all situated throughout southeast Allegheny County. Only PA 885 remains active today.

Pennsylvania Route 881 began at the intersection of Walnut Street and Long Run Road in Versailles and ran northbound to U.S. 30 in East Pittsburgh. After PA 881 was decommissioned in 1946, nearby PA 148 was realigned to include two separate segments of the former route.

Browse numbered routes
← PA 880	PA	→ PA 882

== PA 882 ==
Pennsylvania Route 882
- Location: Lincoln-Elizabeth Township
- Length: 5.2 mi (8.4 km)
- Existed: 1928–1946

Pennsylvania Route 882 began at the intersection of Lovedale and Mill Hill Roads (which was the PA 884 junction at the time) in Lincoln and ran north along winding roads before entering Elizabeth Township and reaching the northern terminus at PA 48 as part of a five-way intersection before the Boston Bridge (PA 883 also terminated at this intersection from the south before its decommissioning in 1932).

Browse numbered routes
← PA 881	PA	→ PA 883

== PA 883 ==
Pennsylvania Route 883
- Location: Elizabeth Township
- Length: 3.5 mi (5.6 km)
- Existed: 1928–1932

Pennsylvania Route 883 was situated entirely in Elizabeth Township, beginning on Broadlawn Road at PA 48 and running northbound along Broadlawn, Greenock Buena Vista and Renzie Roads before terminating back onto PA 48 at a 5-way intersection before the Boston Bridge (PA 882 also terminated at this intersection from the west).

Browse numbered routes
← PA 882	PA	→ PA 884

== PA 884 ==
Pennsylvania Route 884
- Location: Elizabeth Township-Elizabeth Borough
- Length: 6.0 mi (9.7 km)
- Existed: 1928–1946

Pennsylvania Route 884 started on Long Hollow Road at a former segment of PA 31 (now PA 136) in Elizabeth Borough (right near the Allegheny/Westmoreland County border) and ran northbound to its terminus at PA 51 in Elizabeth Borough.

Browse numbered routes
← PA 883	PA	→ PA 885

== PA 886 ==
Pennsylvania Route 886
- Location: Elizabeth Township
- Length: 2.0 mi (3.2 km)
- Existed: 1928–1946

Pennsylvania Route 886 began on Mill Hill Road at PA 48 and ran westbound, straddling along the border of Elizabeth Township and Lincoln before reaching the western terminus at then-PA 884 (McKeesport Road). In 1999, PA 86 in Crawford County was reassigned SR 0886 (but not as that route as the PA 86 signage has been kept intact) when Interstate 86 opened in Erie County and was given the SR 0086 designation.

Browse numbered routes
← PA 885	PA	→ PA 888

== PA 894 ==
Pennsylvania Route 894
- Location: Paxtonia–Piketown
- Length: 7 mi (11 km)
- Existed: 1928–1946

Pennsylvania Route 894 (PA 894) in Dauphin County originally ran from former PA 43 (now U.S. 22) in Paxtonia to Linglestown, Pennsylvania. In 1936, PA 894's northern end was extended, terminating at PA 443 in Piketown.

== PA 905 ==
Pennsylvania Route 905
- Location: Forward Township–Elizabeth
- Length: 7.0 mi (11.3 km)
- Existed: 1928–1946

Pennsylvania Route 905 (PA 905), situated in the southernmost area of Allegheny County, ran from a former alignment of PA 31 (now PA 136) in Forward Township to PA 51 in Elizabeth. PA 905 was first designated in 1928 as a short unpaved spur off PA 31 to the east of Monongahela. In 1930, the route was constructed as a concrete road serving as a shortcut between Monongahela and Elizabeth. The road connected farmland in Forward Township with Elizabeth and PA 31 and formed part of an outer beltline of Allegheny County. The PA 905 designation was removed in 1946.

Browse numbered routes
← PA 904	PA	→ PA 906

== PA 908 ==
Pennsylvania Route 908
- Location: Harmar–Harrison Township
- Length: 16.0 mi (25.7 km)
- Existed: 1928–1946

Pennsylvania Route 908 (PA 894) in Allegheny County ran from Harmar to the northeastern corner of the county in Natrona Heights, beginning and ending at different points of a former (pre-Allegheny Valley Expressway) alignment of PA 28 (Freeport Road).

Browse numbered routes
← PA 907	PA	→ PA 909

== PA 909 ==
Pennsylvania Route 909
- Location: Harmar–New Kensington/Lower Burrell
- Length: 6 mi (9.7 km)
- Existed: 1928–1946

Pennsylvania Route 909 (PA 909) was a 6-mile state road that ran across and parallel to the Allegheny River through Oakmont, Plum, New Kensington and Lower Burrell, northeast of Pittsburgh. From its southern terminus at the Freeport Road (Old PA 28) end of the Hulton Bridge in Harmar/Allegheny County, PA 909 ran across the bridge along Hulton Road, Coxcomb Hill Road and Logan's Ferry Road and into Westmoreland County where the northern terminus at PA 366 straddles between New Kensington and Lower Burrell. Although officially decommissioned in 1946, a signpost at the intersection of Logan's Ferry and Coxcomb Hill Roads shows the latter road as ROUTE 909.

Two of the Allegheny County's Belt System routes run concurrently with this former route:
: From the southern terminus at Freeport Road (Old PA 28) to the intersection of Hulton and Coxcomb Hill Roads
: From the intersection of Coxcomb Hill and Logan's Ferry Roads to the northern terminus at PA 366.

Browse numbered routes
← PA 908	PA	→ PA 910

== PA 911 ==
Pennsylvania Route 911
- Location: South Fayette Township–Collier Township
- Length: 3.0 mi (4.8 km)
- Existed: 1928–1946

Pennsylvania Route 911 in Allegheny County ran from an old segment of PA 50 (formerly PA 28) in South Fayette Township to PA 50 (formerly PA 519) in Collier Township.

Browse numbered routes
← PA 910	PA	→ PA 913

== PA 918 ==
Pennsylvania Route 918
- Location: Southampton Township
- Length: 4.5 mi (7.2 km)
- Existed: 1928–1946

Pennsylvania Route 918 in Bedford County first ran from the MD/PA state line to PA 326 in Southampton Township. In 1936, PA 918 was truncated down to 4 1/2 miles when it was "swapped" with the segment of PA 326 from Chaneysville to PA 26.

Browse numbered routes
← PA 917	PA	→ PA 919

== PA 930 ==
Pennsylvania Route 930
- Location: Moon Township-Ohioville
- Length: 25.0 mi (40.2 km)
- Existed: 1928–1946

Pennsylvania Route 930 was first commissioned for 1 1/2 miles on Galilee Road between Moravia and West Pittsburg in Beaver County; it was moved and extended to a 2-county route in 1936, running from PA 51 in Moon Township/Allegheny County to PA 168 in Ohioville/Beaver County until its decommissioning in 1946. Thirty years later, the segment of PA 51 from Narrows Run Road (now University Boulevard) in Moon Township to its then-concurrency with PA 18 in Monaca was moved to its current alignment on former PA 930. The original route on Galilee Road is now an alignment of PA 168.

Browse numbered routes
← PA 929	PA	→ PA 931

== PA 931 ==
Pennsylvania Route 931
- Location: Frankfort Springs–Findlay Township
- Length: 6.0 mi (9.7 km)
- Existed: 1928–1946

Pennsylvania Route 931 (Clinton Frankfort Road) ran from PA 18 in Frankfort Springs to U.S. 30 in the Clinton neighborhood of Findlay Township and was situated along the Beaver, Washington and Allegheny County lines.

Browse numbered routes
← PA 930	PA	→ PA 932

== PA 932 ==
Pennsylvania Route 932
- Location: Pulaski Township–Shenango Township
- Length: 6.0 mi (9.7 km)
- Existed: 1928–1985

Pennsylvania Route 932 ran from US 422 in Pulaski Township/Lawrence County to PA 318 near the PA/OH state line in Shenango Township/Mercer County. This is one of the very few defunct routes that lasted longer than most that were commissioned in 1928. It was downgraded in 1985 with two SR route numbers that changed at the county line: SR 4001 in Lawrence County and SR 3001 in Mercer County.

Browse numbered routes
← PA 931	PA	→ PA 933

== PA 933 ==
Pennsylvania Route 933
- Location: Mundys Corner–Northern Cambria
- Existed: 1928–1967

Pennsylvania Route 933 in Cambria County was the designation for what is now the segment of PA 271 from U.S. 22 in Jackson Township to U.S. 219 in Northern Cambria.

== PA 945 ==
Pennsylvania Route 945
- Location: Smithfield Township–Middle Smithfield Township
- Length: 6 mi (9.7 km)
- Existed: 1928–1946

Pennsylvania Route 945 ran from PA 402 in Smithfield Township to US 209 in Middle Smithfield Township between 1928 and 1946.

== PA 951 ==
Pennsylvania Route 951
- Location: Prescottville–Luthersburg
- Length: 10 mi (16 km)
- Existed: 1928–1946

Pennsylvania Route 951 began at the concurrency of U.S. 219/U.S.322 in Luthersburg/Clearfield County and ran for 10 miles to U.S. 322 in Prescottville/Jefferson County.

Browse numbered routes
← PA 950	PA	→ PA 952

== PA 962 ==
Pennsylvania Route 962
- Location: Silver Spring–Milford
- Length: 3.0 mi (4.8 km)
- Existed: 1928–1946

Pennsylvania Route 962 in Pike County ran from U.S. 6 in Milford to the borough of Silver Spring. It was decommissioned in 1946 and was later reassigned as its current designation of quadrant SR 2001.

== PA 963 ==
Pennsylvania Route 963
- Location: Matamoras–Millrift
- Length: 3.95 mi (6.36 km)
- Existed: 1928–1946

Pennsylvania Route 963 ran from US 6 and US 209 in Matamoras to Millrift between 1928 and 1946.

== PA 964 ==
Pennsylvania Route 964
- Location: Frenchcreek Township–Canal Township
- Length: 6.0 mi (9.7 km)
- Existed: 1928–1966

Pennsylvania Route 964 in Venango County first ran from the borough of Utica to U.S. 322 in Canal Township. In 1936, the route was extended and its southern terminus moved to a former alignment of PA 285 in Frenchcreek Township.

Browse numbered routes
← PA 963	PA	→ PA 965

== PA 966 ==
Pennsylvania Route 966
- Location: Clarion–Scotch Hill
- Length: 11.0 mi (17.7 km)
- Existed: 1928–1969

Pennsylvania Route 966 in Clarion County first ran from U.S. 322/PA 66 in Clarion to an unnumbered road in Miola; this was extended in 1936 to PA 36 in Scotch Hill. PA 966 was decommissioned in 1969 and renumbered as a realignment of PA 68 which was truncated the following year to its current northern terminus at U.S. 322.

Browse numbered routes
← PA 965	PA	→ PA 967

== PA 968 ==
Pennsylvania Route 968
- Location: Brookville–Polk Township
- Length: 15.0 mi (24.1 km)
- Existed: 1928–1984

Pennsylvania Route 968 in Jefferson County first ran from U.S. 322 in Brookville to an unnumbered road in Warsaw Township. It was extended in 1936 with its new northern terminus at PA 949 in Polk Township. PA 968 is one of the longer lasting routes that were assigned in 1928; it was decommissioned in 1984 and reassigned as quadrant SR 4005.

PA 968 served as the northern terminus of PA 830 prior to 1984.

Browse numbered routes
← PA 967	PA	→ PA 969

== PA 979 ==
Pennsylvania Route 979
- Location: Robinson Township (Washington County)–North Fayette Township
- Length: 4.0 mi (6.4 km)
- Existed: 1928–1946

Pennsylvania Route 979 ran entirely along North Branch Road from PA 980 in Robinson Township, Washington County to PA 978 in North Fayette Township, Allegheny County.

Browse numbered routes
← PA 978	PA	→ PA 980

== PA 990 ==
Pennsylvania Route 990
- Location: North Versailles
- Length: 0.3 mi (480 m)
- Existed: 1928–1946

One of the shortest state routes ever commissioned, Pennsylvania Route 990 in Allegheny County ran from then-PA 881 (East Pittsburgh-McKeesport Boulevard) to U.S. 30 in North Versailles. This road is now known as Navy-Marine Corps Way.

Browse numbered routes
← PA 989	PA	→ PA 991

== PA 991 ==
Pennsylvania Route 991
- Location: North Versailles-East McKeesport
- Length: 2.0 mi (3.2 km)
- Existed: 1928–1946

Pennsylvania Route 991 (Fifth Avenue) in Allegheny County ran from Westinghouse Avenue (at the junction of then-PA 881) in North Versailles to U.S. 30 in East McKeesport. After its decommissioning in 1946, PA 991 was reassigned as a realignment of current PA 148.

Browse numbered routes
← PA 990	PA	→ PA 992

== PA 992 ==
Pennsylvania Route 992
- Location: Adamsburg-Harrison City
- Length: 4.0 mi (6.4 km)
- Existed: 1928–1946

Pennsylvania Route 992 in Westmoreland County ran from U.S. 30 in Adamsburg to former PA 180 (now PA 130) in Harrison City

Browse numbered routes
← PA 991	PA	→ PA 993

== PA 996 ==
Pennsylvania Route 996
- Location: Guilford-Scotland
- Length: 3.0 mi (4.8 km)
- Existed: 1928–1946

Pennsylvania Route 996 in Franklin County ran from U.S. 30 in Guilford to PA 997 in Scotland.

Browse numbered routes
← PA 995	PA	→ PA 997

== PA 998 ==
Pennsylvania Route 998
- Location: Paradise Township
- Length: 4.0 mi (6.4 km)
- Existed: 1928–1946

Pennsylvania Route 998 ran along the segment of West Canal Road from U.S. 30 northbound to PA 234 in Paradise Township/York County.

Browse numbered routes
← PA 997	PA	→ PA 999

== See also ==
- List of state routes in Pennsylvania
