= South Penn Run =

Stream in Pennsylvania, USA

South Penn Run Tributary to West Branch Tunungwant Creek
- Location of South Penn Run mouth South Penn Run (the United States)

Location
- Country: United States
- State: Pennsylvania
- County: McKean

Physical characteristics
- Source: Fuller Brook divide
  - location: about 4 miles northwest of Lewis Run, Pennsylvania
  - coordinates: 41°54′26.00″N 078°44′28.00″W
  - elevation: 2,080 ft (630 m)
- Mouth: West Branch Tunungwant Creek
  - location: about 3 miles northwest of Lewis Run, Pennsylvania
  - coordinates: 41°54′12.22″N 078°42′50.11″W
  - elevation: 1,627 ft (496 m)
- Length: 1.24 mi (2.00 km)
- Basin size: 0.69 square miles (1.8 km^{2})
- Discharge
  - location: West Branch Tunungwant Creek
  - average: 1.59 cu ft/s (0.045 m^{3}/s) at mouth with West Branch Tunungwant Creek

Basin features
- Progression: West Branch Tunungwant Creek → Tunungwant Creek → Allegheny River → Ohio River → Mississippi River → Gulf of Mexico
- River system: Allegheny River
- Tributaries
  - left: unnamed tributaries
  - right: unnamed tributaries
- Bridges: none

South Penn Run is a 1.24 mi (2.00 km) long first-order tributary to West Branch Tunungwant Creek. This is the only stream of this name in the United States.

== Course ==
South Penn Run rises about 4 miles (6.4 km) northwest of Lewis Run, Pennsylvania, and then flows east-southeast to meet West Branch Tunungwant Creek about 3 miles (4.8 km) northwest of Lewis Run, Pennsylvania.

== Watershed ==
South Penn Run drains 0.69 square miles (1.8 km^{2}) of area, receives about 47.1 in/year (120 cm/year) of precipitation, and is about 69.41% forested.

== See also ==
- List of rivers of Pennsylvania
