= Foster Run (East Branch Tunungwant Creek tributary) =

Stream in Pennsylvania, USA

Foster Run Tributary to East Branch Tunungwant Creek
- Location of Foster Run mouth Foster Run (East Branch Tunungwant Creek tributary) (the United States)

Location
- Country: United States
- State: Pennsylvania
- County: McKean
- Borough: Lewis Run

Physical characteristics
- Source: Kissem Run divide
  - location: about 1.5 miles northwest of Lewis Run, Pennsylvania
  - coordinates: 41°52′52.00″N 078°41′9.00″W
  - elevation: 2,180 ft (660 m)
- Mouth: East Branch Tunungwant Creek
  - location: Lewis Run, Pennsylvania
  - coordinates: 41°52′36.23″N 078°39′32.10″W
  - elevation: 1,532 ft (467 m)
- Length: 1.78 mi (2.86 km)
- Basin size: 0.88 square miles (2.3 km^{2})
- Discharge
  - location: East Branch Tunungwant Creek
  - average: 2.00 cu ft/s (0.057 m^{3}/s) at mouth with East Branch Tunungwant Creek

Basin features
- Progression: East Branch Tunungwant Creek → Tunungwant Creek → Allegheny River → Ohio River → Mississippi River → Gulf of Mexico
- River system: Allegheny River
- Tributaries
  - left: unnamed tributaries
  - right: unnamed tributaries
- Bridges: unnamed road (x2), US 219, Cam-Hay Drive

Foster Run is a 1.78 mi (2.86 km) long first-order tributary to East Branch Tunungwant Creek.

== Course ==
Foster Run rises about 1.5 miles (2.4 km) northwest of Lewis Run, Pennsylvania, and then flows east-southeast to meet East Branch Tunungwant Creek at Lewis Run.

== Watershed ==
Foster Run drains 0.88 square miles (2.3 km^{2}) of area, receives about 46.8 in/year (119 cm/year) of precipitation, and is about 85.27% forested.

== See also ==
- List of rivers of Pennsylvania
