= Watrous Run =

Stream in Pennsylvania, USA

Watrous Run Tributary to East Branch Tunungwant Creek
- Location of Watrous Run mouth Watrous Run (the United States)

Location
- Country: United States
- State: Pennsylvania
- County: McKean
- Borough: Lewis Run

Physical characteristics
- Source: Kissem Run divide
  - location: about 1-mile northwest of Lewis Run, Pennsylvania
  - coordinates: 41°53′6.00″N 078°40′43.00″W
  - elevation: 2,000 ft (610 m)
- Mouth: East Branch Tunungwant Creek
  - location: Lewis Run, Pennsylvania
  - coordinates: 41°52′48.23″N 078°39′30.10″W
  - elevation: 1,516 ft (462 m)
- Length: 1.00 mi (1.61 km)
- Basin size: 0.44 square miles (1.1 km^{2})
- Discharge
  - location: East Branch Tunungwant Creek
  - average: 1.01 cu ft/s (0.029 m^{3}/s) at mouth with East Branch Tunungwant Creek

Basin features
- Progression: East Branch Tunungwant Creek → Tunungwant Creek → Allegheny River → Ohio River → Mississippi River → Gulf of Mexico
- River system: Allegheny River
- Tributaries
  - left: unnamed tributaries
  - right: unnamed tributaries
- Bridges: US 219

Watrous Run is a 1.00 mi (1.61 km) long first-order tributary to East Branch Tunungwant Creek. This is the only stream of this name in the United States.

== Course ==
Watrous Run rises about 1 mile (1.6 km) northwest of Lewis Run, Pennsylvania, and then flows southeast to meet East Branch Tunungwant Creek at Lewis Run.

== Watershed ==
Watrous Run drains 0.44 square miles (1.1 km^{2}) of area, receives about 46.4 in/year (118 cm/year) of precipitation, and is about 91.36% forested.

== See also ==
- List of rivers of Pennsylvania
