= Sheppard Run (East Branch Tunungwant Creek tributary) =

Stream in Pennsylvania, USA

Sheppard Run Tributary to East Branch Tunungwant Creek
- Location of Sheppard Run mouth Sheppard Run (East Branch Tunungwant Creek tributary) (the United States)

Location
- Country: United States
- State: Pennsylvania
- County: McKean

Physical characteristics
- Source: Kissem Run divide
  - location: about 1-mile west of Howard, Pennsylvania
  - coordinates: 41°53′6.60″N 078°41′20.00″W
  - elevation: 2,180 ft (660 m)
- Mouth: East Branch Tunungwant Creek
  - location: Custer City, Pennsylvania
  - coordinates: 41°54′32.23″N 078°38′47.10″W
  - elevation: 1,480 ft (450 m)
- Length: 2.92 mi (4.70 km)
- Basin size: 2.72 square miles (7.0 km^{2})
- Discharge
  - location: East Branch Tunungwant Creek
  - average: 5.87 cu ft/s (0.166 m^{3}/s) at mouth with East Branch Tunungwant Creek

Basin features
- Progression: East Branch Tunungwant Creek → Tunungwant Creek → Allegheny River → Ohio River → Mississippi River → Gulf of Mexico
- River system: Allegheny River
- Tributaries
  - left: unnamed tributaries
  - right: unnamed tributaries
- Bridges: PA 770 (x2), US 219

Sheppard Run is a 2.92 mi (4.70 km) long first-order tributary to East Branch Tunungwant Creek.

== Variant names ==
According to the Geographic Names Information System, it has also been known historically as:

- Shepard Run

== Course ==
Sheppard Run rises about 1 mile (1.6 km) west of Howard, Pennsylvania, and then flows northeast to meet East Branch Tunungwant Creek at Custer City, Pennsylvania.

== Watershed ==
Sheppard Run drains 2.72 square miles (7.0 km^{2}) of area, receives about 46.3 in/year (118 cm/year) of precipitation, and is about 90.47% forested.

== See also ==
- List of rivers of Pennsylvania
