= Two Mile Run (West Branch Tunungwant Creek tributary) =

Stream in Pennsylvania, USA

Two Mile Run Tributary to West Branch Tunungwant Creek
- Location of Two Mile Run mouth Two Mile Run (West Branch Tunungwant Creek tributary) (the United States)

Location
- Country: United States
- State: Pennsylvania
- County: McKean

Physical characteristics
- Source: Maim Run divide
  - location: about 3 miles west-southwest of Lewis Run, Pennsylvania
  - coordinates: 41°52′9.22″N 078°43′4.11″W
  - elevation: 2,140 ft (650 m)
- Mouth: West Branch Tunungwant Creek
  - location: about 4 miles west-northwest of Lewis Run, Pennsylvania
  - coordinates: 41°52′50.22″N 078°44′4.11″W
  - elevation: 1,762 ft (537 m)
- Length: 1.41 mi (2.27 km)
- Basin size: 0.9 square miles (2.3 km^{2})
- Discharge
  - location: West Branch Tunungwant Creek
  - average: 2.10 cu ft/s (0.059 m^{3}/s) at mouth with West Branch Tunungwant Creek

Basin features
- Progression: West Branch Tunungwant Creek → Tunungwant Creek → Allegheny River → Ohio River → Mississippi River → Gulf of Mexico
- River system: Allegheny River
- Tributaries
  - left: unnamed tributaries
  - right: unnamed tributaries
- Bridges: none

Two Mile Run is a 1.41 mi (2.27 km) long first-order tributary to West Branch Tunungwant Creek.

== Course ==
Two Mile Run rises about 3 miles (4.8 km) west-southwest of Lewis Run, Pennsylvania, and then flows northwest to meet West Branch Tunungwant Creek about 4 miles (6.4 km) west-northwest of Lewis Run, Pennsylvania.

== Watershed ==
Two Mile Run drains 0.9 square miles (2.3 km^{2}) of area, receives about 47.6 in/year (121 cm/year) of precipitation, and is about 91.79% forested.

== See also ==
- List of rivers of Pennsylvania
