= Langmade Brook =

Stream in Pennsylvania, USA

Langmade Brook Tributary to West Branch Tunungwant Creek
- Location of Langmade Brook mouth Langmade Brook (the United States)

Location
- Country: United States
- State: Pennsylvania
- County: McKean

Physical characteristics
- Source: Marilla Brook divide
  - location: about 5 miles southwest of Bradford, Pennsylvania
  - coordinates: 41°56′19.00″N 078°44′15.00″W
  - elevation: 2,130 ft (650 m)
- Mouth: West Branch Tunungwant Creek
  - location: about 3 miles southwest of Bradford, Pennsylvania
  - coordinates: 41°55′30.23″N 078°41′58.11″W
  - elevation: 1,536 ft (468 m)
- Length: 2.21 mi (3.56 km)
- Basin size: 2.07 square miles (5.4 km^{2})
- Discharge
  - location: West Branch Tunungwant Creek
  - average: 4.49 cu ft/s (0.127 m^{3}/s) at mouth with West Branch Tunungwant Creek

Basin features
- Progression: West Branch Tunungwant Creek → Tunungwant Creek → Allegheny River → Ohio River → Mississippi River → Gulf of Mexico
- River system: Allegheny River
- Tributaries
  - left: unnamed tributaries
  - right: unnamed tributaries
- Bridges: Crookerhouse Lane

Langmade Brook is a 2.21 mi (3.56 km) long first-order tributary to West Branch Tunungwant Creek. This is the only stream of this name in the United States.

== Variant names ==
According to the Geographic Names Information System, it has also been known historically as:

- Cramer Brook

== Course ==
Langmade Brook rises about 5 miles (8.0 km) southwest of Bradford, Pennsylvania, and then flows southeast to meet West Branch Tunungwant Creek about 3 miles southwest of Bradford, Pennsylvania.

== Watershed ==
Langmade Brook drains 2.07 square miles (5.4 km^{2}) of area, receives about 46.2 in/year (117 cm/year) of precipitation, and is about 84.80% forested.

== See also ==
- List of rivers of Pennsylvania
