= Gilbert Run (Marilla Brook tributary) =

Stream in Pennsylvania, USA

Gilbert Run Tributary to Marilla Brook
- Location of Gilbert Run mouth Gilbert Run (Marilla Brook tributary) (the United States)

Location
- Country: United States
- State: Pennsylvania
- County: McKean

Physical characteristics
- Source: Quaker Run divide
  - location: about 5 miles northwest of Bradford, Pennsylvania
  - coordinates: 41°59′51.00″N 078°44′31.00″W
  - elevation: 2,270 ft (690 m)
- Mouth: Marilla Brook
  - location: about 3 miles west of Bradford, Pennsylvania
  - coordinates: 41°57′14.23″N 078°42′59.11″W
  - elevation: 1,618 ft (493 m)
- Length: 3.43 mi (5.52 km)
- Basin size: 5.02 square miles (13.0 km^{2})
- Discharge
  - location: Marilla Brook
  - average: 10.76 cu ft/s (0.305 m^{3}/s) at mouth with Marilla Brook

Basin features
- Progression: Marilla Brook → West Branch Tunungwant Creek → Tunungwant Creek → Allegheny River → Ohio River → Mississippi River → Gulf of Mexico
- River system: Allegheny River
- Tributaries
  - left: unnamed tributaries
  - right: unnamed tributaries
- Waterbodies: Bradford City Number 2 Reservoir
- Bridges: none

Gilbert Run is a 3.43 mi (5.52 km) long second-order tributary to Marilla Brook.

== Course ==
Gilbert Run rises about 5 miles (8.0 km) northwest of Bradford, Pennsylvania, and then flows south-southeast to meet Marilla Brook about 3 miles west of Bradford, Pennsylvania.

== Watershed ==
Gilbert Run drains 5.02 square miles (13.0 km^{2}) of area, receives about 46.9 in/year (119 cm/year) of precipitation, and is about 87.51% forested.

== See also ==
- List of rivers of Pennsylvania
