= Wyola =

Wyola may refer to:

== Inhabited localities ==
- Wyola, Arkansas, USA
- Wyola, Montana, USA
- Wyola, Pennsylvania, USA

== Other ==
- Lake Wyola, Massachusetts, USA
- SS Wyola, Australian ship
