= Minard Run =

Stream in Pennsylvania, USA

Minard Run Tributary to East Branch Tunungwant Creek
- Location of Minard Run mouth Minard Run (the United States)

Location
- Country: United States
- State: Pennsylvania
- County: McKean

Physical characteristics
- Source: Railroad Run divide
  - location: about 2 miles east-southeast of Lewis Run, Pennsylvania
  - coordinates: 41°52′6.00″N 078°41′20.00″W
  - elevation: 2,200 ft (670 m)
- Mouth: East Branch Tunungwant Creek
  - location: Degolia, Pennsylvania
  - coordinates: 41°54′39.23″N 078°38′45.10″W
  - elevation: 1,478 ft (450 m)
- Length: 3.59 mi (5.78 km)
- Basin size: 8.48 square miles (22.0 km^{2})
- Discharge
  - location: East Branch Tunungwant Creek
  - average: 19.71 cu ft/s (0.558 m^{3}/s) at mouth with East Branch Tunungwant Creek

Basin features
- Progression: East Branch Tunungwant Creek → Tunungwant Creek → Allegheny River → Ohio River → Mississippi River → Gulf of Mexico
- River system: Allegheny River
- Tributaries
  - left: unnamed tributaries
  - right: unnamed tributaries
- Bridges: Minard Run Road (x2), Langley Drive, Pennhills Drive, Fuller Road, High Street

Minard Run is a 3.59 mi (5.78 km) long third-order tributary to East Branch Tunungwant Creek. This is the only stream of this name in the United States.

== Course ==
Minard Run rises about 2 miles (3.2 km) east-southeast of Lewis Run, Pennsylvania, and then flows northeast and turns northwest to meet East Branch Tunungwant Creek at Degolia.

== Watershed ==
Minard Run drains 8.48 square miles (22.0 km^{2}) of area, receives about 46.5 in/year (118 cm/year) of precipitation, and is about 81.97% forested.

== See also ==
- List of rivers of Pennsylvania
