= Bennett Brook =

Bennett Brook may refer to the following rivers:

- Bennett Brook (Australia)
- Bennett Brook (West Branch Oswegatchie River tributary), in New York
- Bennett Brook (West Kill tributary), in New York
- Bennett Brook (West Branch Tunungwant Creek tributary), in McKean County, Pennsylvania
