= West Branch Tunungwant Creek =

Stream in Pennsylvania, USA

West Branch Tunungwant Creek Tributary to Tunungwant Creek
- Location of West Branch Tunungwant Creek mouth West Branch Tunungwant Creek (the United States)

Location
- Country: United States
- State: Pennsylvania
- County: McKean
- City: Bradford

Physical characteristics
- Source: Chappel Fork divide
  - location: about 5 miles west-southwest of Lewis Run, Pennsylvania
  - coordinates: 41°51′43.22″N 078°44′55.11″W
  - elevation: 2,180 ft (660 m)
- Mouth: Tunungwant Creek
  - location: Bradford, Pennsylvania
  - coordinates: 41°57′29.23″N 078°38′29.10″W
  - elevation: 1,421 ft (433 m)
- Length: 9.80 mi (15.77 km)
- Basin size: 42.10 square miles (109.0 km^{2})
- Discharge
  - location: Tunungwant Creek
  - average: 84.40 cu ft/s (2.390 m^{3}/s) at mouth with Tunungwant Creek

Basin features
- Progression: Tunungwant Creek → Allegheny River → Ohio River → Mississippi River → Gulf of Mexico
- River system: Allegheny River
- Tributaries
  - left: South Penn Run; Fuller Brook; Langmade Brook; Marilla Brook; Bennett Brook
  - right: Two Mile Run; Kissem Run
- Waterbodies: Bradford City Number 5 Reservoir
- Bridges: Glendorn Drive, Crookerhouse Lane, Clarks Lane, Dorothy Lane, Barbour Street, Mechanic Street, Kennedy Street, Davis Street, Forman Street, US 219

West Branch Tunungwant Creek is a 9.80 mi (15.77 km) long fourth-order tributary to Tunungwant Creek. This is the only stream of this name in the United States.

== Course ==
West Branch Tunungwant Creek rises about 5 miles (8.0 km) west-southwest of Lewis Run, Pennsylvania, and then flows northeast to meet Tunungwant Creek at Bradford, Pennsylvania to form Tunungwant Creek with East Branch Tunungwant Creek.

== Watershed ==
West Branch Tunungwant Creek drains 42.90 square miles (111.1 km^{2}) of area, receives about 46.6 in/year (118 cm/year) of precipitation, and is about 84.55% forested.

== See also ==
- List of rivers of Pennsylvania
