= Pennsylvania Route 963 =

Former state highway in Pennsylvania, United States

Pennsylvania Route 963

Route information
- Maintained by Pennsylvania Department of Highways
- Length: 3.95 mi (6.36 km)
- Existed: 1928–1946

Major junctions
- South end: US 6 / US 209 in Matamoras
- North end: End of designation at the community of Millrift

Location
- Country: United States
- State: Pennsylvania
- Counties: Pike

Highway system
- Pennsylvania State Route System; Interstate; US; State; Scenic; Legislative
← PA 962	→ PA 964

Pennsylvania Route 963 was a 3.95-mile (6.36 km) long state highway located in Pike County. The route began at an intersection with U.S. Route 6 and U.S. Route 209 in the Borough of Matamoras, which is settled on the New York state line. PA 963 continued northward for the length of Mill Rift Road up to the community of Millrift, Pennsylvania, where the designation ended. The route was assigned in the 1928 numbering of state highways in the commonwealth and was decommissioned eighteen years later. The designation was later replaced by Pike County Quadrant Route 1017, which heads along the same alignment as PA 963. Geographically, PA 963 and current day 1017 are the easternmost state highways in Pennsylvania.

== Route description ==
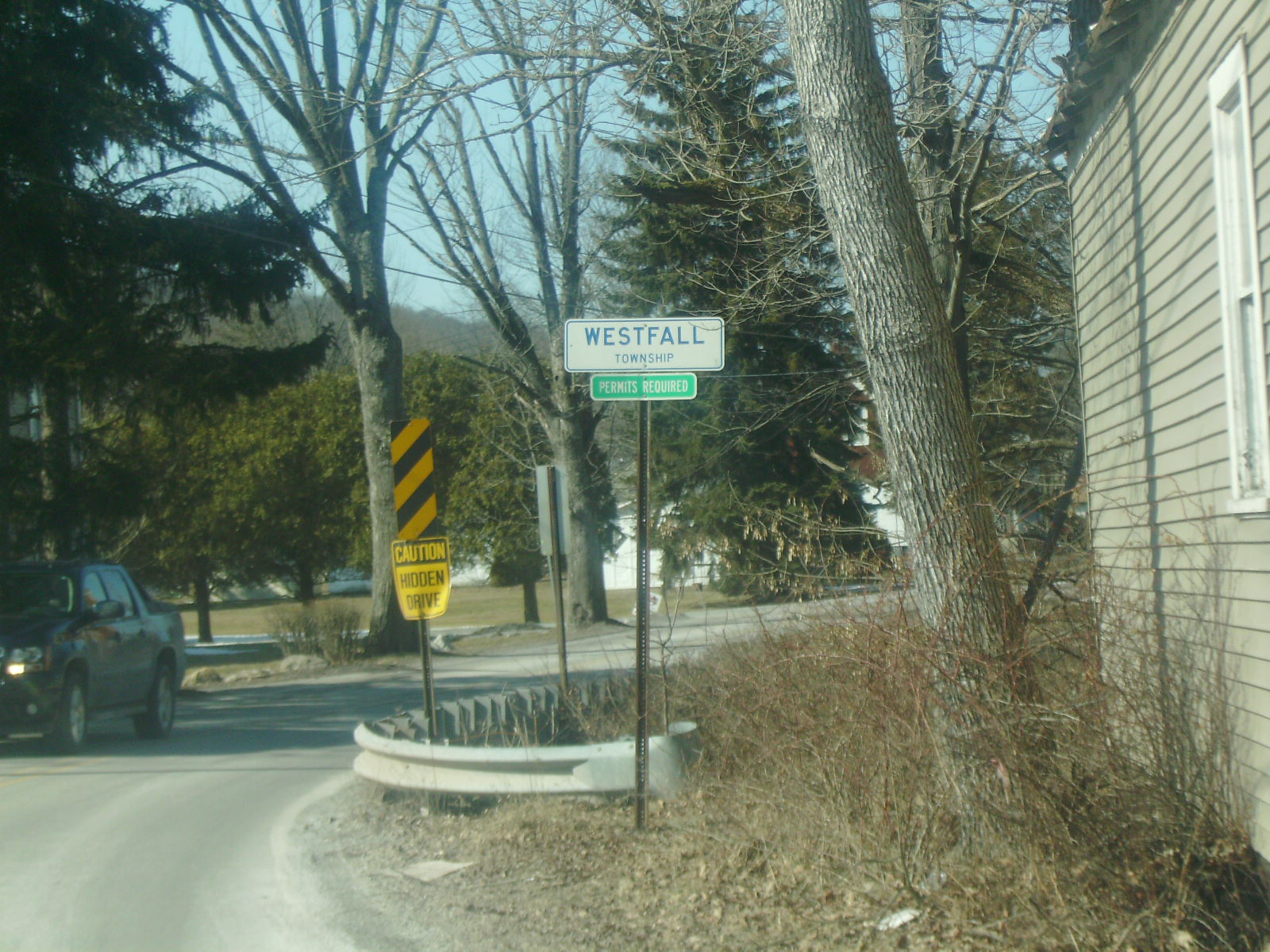
Delaware Drive entering Westfall Township

- Note: This route description is written as the highway that currently runs along this alignment.

The alignment of Pennsylvania Route 963 began at an intersection with U.S. Route 6 and U.S. Route 209 (Pennsylvania Avenue) at the Mid-Delaware Bridge in the Borough of Matamoras. The current designation, Quadrant Route 1017, heads northward along Mill Rift Road (known in Matamoras as Delaware Drive), intersecting with several local roads. The route is mainly residential while in Matamoras itself, and after the intersection with Avenue C, the route turns out of Matamoras and enters Westfall Township, following the shores of the Delaware River. The route continues northward, intersecting with Quadrant Route 1015, which heads eastward.

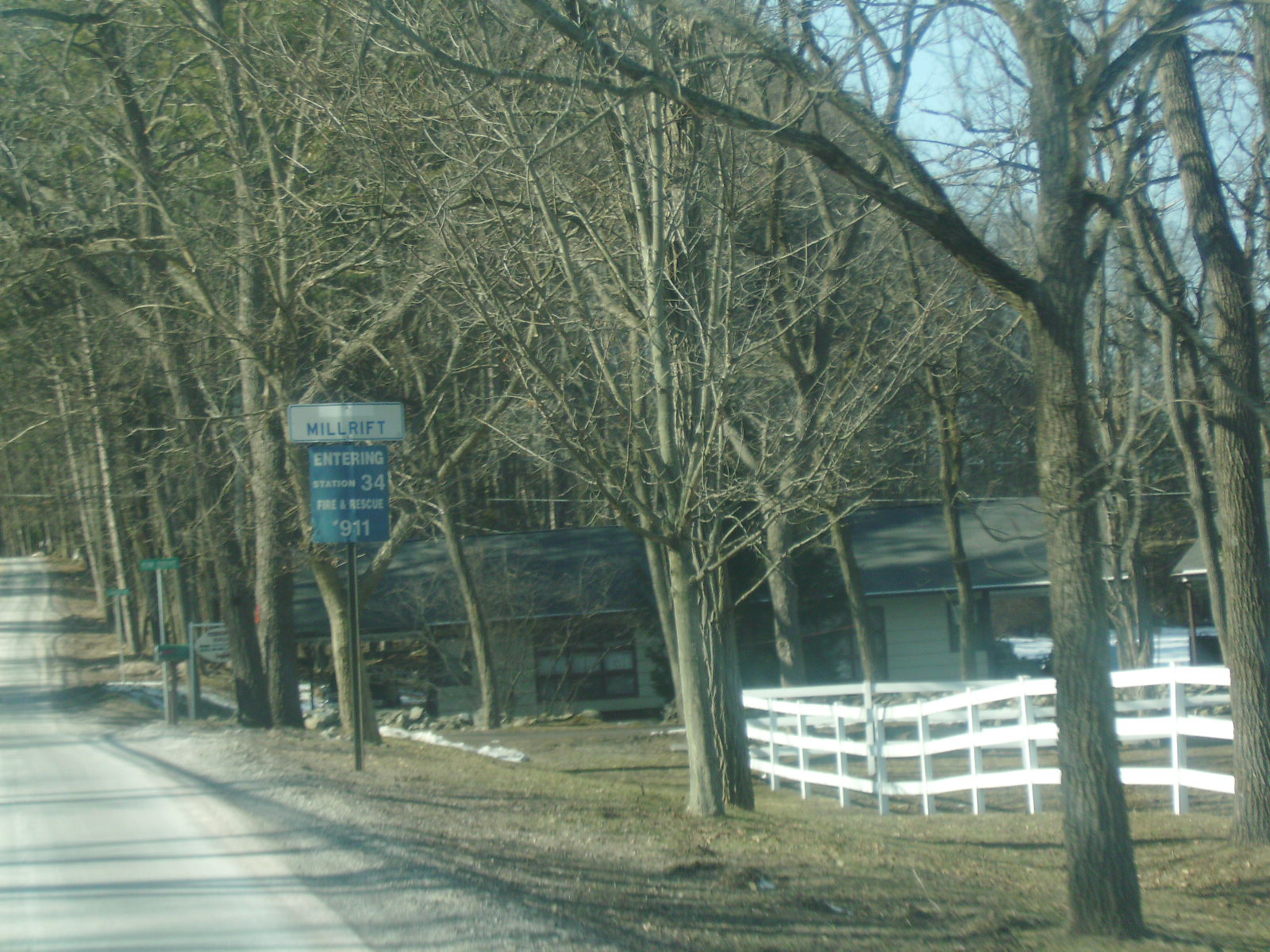
Delaware Drive entering the community of Millrift

Along the shores of the Delaware, QR 1017 passes through a moderate development. At an intersection with Decker Lane, the highway turns to the north, and the development along the highway begins to lessen. After LaBarr Lane, Route 1017 turns northward, and at a bend on the Delaware, the highway turns westward. The development lessens further, and the route begins to head through the nearby hills. Along the base of the mountain, the route continues northward and into the community of Millrift, where the PA 963 designation terminated. The current day designation, Quadrant Route 1017, continues into the community itself.

== History ==
Pennsylvania Route 963 was assigned onto the Matamoras–Mill Rift alignment of Mill Rift Road in the 1928 mass commissioning of state highways in the commonwealth. The route was, at the time, the easternmost traffic route in the entire state. However, the route, like many of its kind, was decommissioned after eighteen years, when the Pennsylvania Department of Highways removed the PA 963 designation from the highway. Currently, the alignment of PA 963 is an alignment of Pike County Quadrant Route 1017 from Matamoras to the designation end north of Millrift. The route continues northward as Bluestone Boulevard, a.k.a. Westfall Township Road 446.

== Major intersections ==
The entire route was in Pike County.

Location	mi	km	Destinations	Notes
Matamoras	0.00	0.00	US 6 / US 209	
Millrift	3.95	6.36		Designation ends at the borough
1.000 mi = 1.609 km; 1.000 km = 0.621 mi

== See also ==
- Pennsylvania Route 237
- Pennsylvania Route 962
