= Pennsylvania Route 823 =

Former state highway in Pennsylvania, United States

Pennsylvania Route 823

Route information
- Maintained by Pennsylvania Department of Highways
- Length: 3.4 mi (5.5 km)
- Existed: 1929–1932

Major junctions
- South end: Community of Big Shanty
- North end: US 219 in Lewis Run

Location
- Country: United States
- State: Pennsylvania
- Counties: McKean

Highway system
- Pennsylvania State Route System; Interstate; US; State; Scenic; Legislative
← PA 821	→ PA 824

Pennsylvania Route 823 (PA 823) was a short-lived state highway in the western Pennsylvania county of McKean. PA 823 went northward from the community of Big Shanty along Big Shanty Road and Laffayette Avenue for 3.4 miles (5.5 km), terminating at an intersection with U.S. Route 219 (US 219) in nearby Lewis Run. The route was commissioned by the Department of Highways (now Pennsylvania Department of Transportation) in 1929 and was decommissioned in 1932.

== Route description ==
PA 823 began at the community of Big Shanty. The route went northward then turned to the southeast just north of Big Shanty. The route intersected with Toothman Road, a dead-end highway, beyond which it became known as Big Shanty Road, named after the nearby borough. State Route 823 then curved to the northeast, making a gradual, smooth turn to the north. The route then intersected with Lineman Road, another nearby dead-end highway. From here, a set of railroad tracks parallelled nearby, following PA 823 for most of its length. After that, there was an intersection with Droney Road, which headed out to the paralleling railroad tracks.

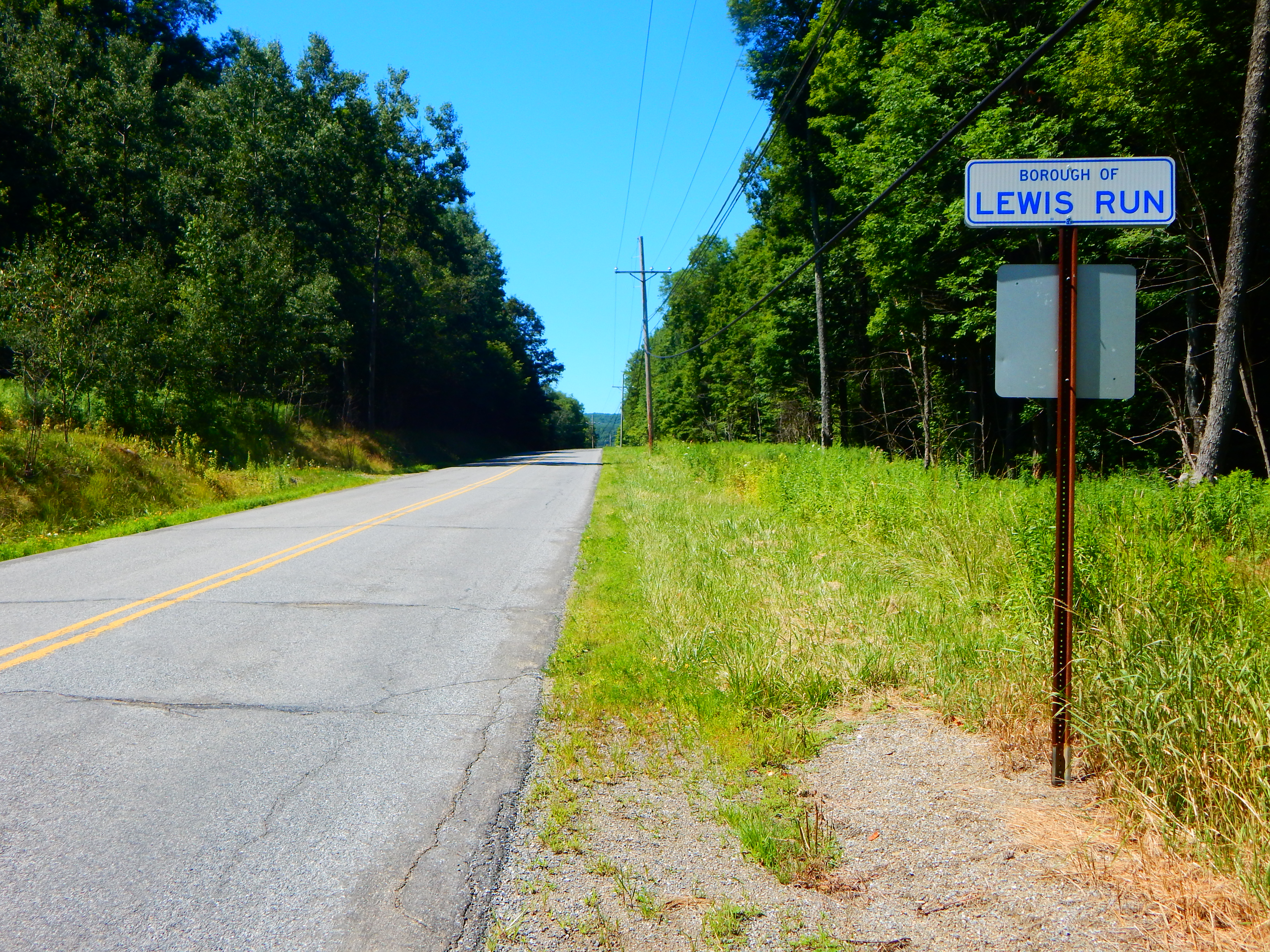
Former PA 823, modern SR 4001, entering Lewis Run

Just north of Droney Road, PA 823 continued northward into the limits of the borough of Lewis Run. The highway then headed to the northwest, changing its name to Laffayette Avenue. After crossing into Lewis Run, there was an intersection with an unnamed loop road and with Valley Hunt Road, a dead-end highway. The route then turned to the northeast, intersecting with a few more local roads, and terminated at an intersection with US 219 in the northern borough limits of Lewis Run.

== History ==
PA 823 was designated as a state route in 1929, a year after the mass commissioning of state traffic routes in Pennsylvania. The route served as a spur off US 219. The state route designation, however, did not last long, being decommissioned just three years after its assignment in 1932. The route is now designated and signed by PennDOT as State Route 4001, which extended the state designation from Big Shanty down to nearby PA 59.

== Major intersections ==
The entire route was in McKean County.

Location	mi	km	Destinations	Notes
Big Shanty	0.0	0.0		
Lewis Run	3.4	5.5	US 219	
1.000 mi = 1.609 km; 1.000 km = 0.621 mi
