= State Route 2001 (Pike County, Pennsylvania) =

State highway in Pennsylvania, United States

State Route 2001
- Map of Pike County in northeastern Pennsylvania with SR 2001 highlighted in red

Route information
- Maintained by PennDOT
- Length: 22 mi (35 km)
- Existed: 1993–present

Major junctions
- South end: US 209 in Lehman Township
- North end: US 6 in Milford

Location
- Country: United States
- State: Pennsylvania
- Counties: Pike

Highway system
- Pennsylvania State Route System; Interstate; US; State; Scenic; Legislative
← PA 961	→ PA 963

State Quadrant Route 2001 in Pike County, Pennsylvania is a 22-mile (35 km) road in Dingman, Lehman, Delaware and Milford Townships. Formerly Pennsylvania Route 962 in part, the road stretches from U.S. Route 209 in Lehman Township to West Harford Street in downtown Milford. There are very few notable roads that intersect with SR 2001, the main three being Pennsylvania Route 739, Log Tavern Road (SR 2006) and Raymondskill Road (SR 2009).

== Route description ==
State Route 2001 begins at a blinker in Lehman Township, about 1-mile (1.6 km) north of the Monroe/Pike County border. The road moves westward for a bit, turning towards the north to Milford at about 1-mile (1.6 km). Bushkill Falls Road becomes SR 2003, which goes on past Bushkill Falls, the Pocmont Resort and ending at Pennsylvania Route 402. A small local road, Broadhead Road, leaves to a sharp right soon after. Broadhead Road takes you to U.S. 209 going eastward. At this point, SR 2001 is in the Delaware Water Gap National Recreation Area, which is on the right side most of the route. Little Egypt Road leaves to the right a little later towards the Tom's Creek Picnic Area and U.S. 209. Big Egypt Road, the twin to Little Egypt, leaves to the right later heading for the same area. Briscoe Mountain Road comes in from the right and becomes Sunset Road.

Chesnut Ridge Road leaves to the right for U.S. 209 near Dingmans Ferry. Wilson Hill Road, Quadrant Route 2002, leaves to the right for U.S. 209. A short time after the intersection with Johnny Bee Road, SR 2001 leaves the Delaware Water Gap and moves towards Milford. Quadrant Route 2004, Silver Lake Road, crosses and extends to Pennsylvania Route 739 and Childs Park. Pennsylvania Route 739 crosses at a traffic light in the Dingmans Ferry Business District. A long time later, SR 2001 begins to traverse the border of the Delaware Water Gap. Quadrant Route 2006, Log Tavern Road, begins to the right soon after. Raymondskill Road, Quadrant Route 2009, crosses just southeast of Milford. After Christian Hill Road, SR 2001 becomes known as Water Street and soon Mill Street. SR 2001 ends at U.S. Route 6 in downtown Milford, 22 miles (35 km) from Bushkill.

== History ==
PA 962

A portion of State Route 2001 was formerly known as Pennsylvania Route 962. The route followed the present SR 2001 southwest from US 6, but did not reach US 209 in Bushkill. In the 1993 Pike County maps, the road was given its current designation, State Route 2001. Route 2001 is only one of two roads in Pike County to be part of a former traffic route. The other route is Quadrant Route 1017, which was formerly Pennsylvania Route 963.

== Major repaving of SR 2001 ==
From 1999 to 2007, the Pennsylvania Department of Transportation worked on the whole 22-mile (35 km) stretch of SR 2001. The construction was split into four parts. Part one was from U.S. Route 6 in Milford to Quadrant Route 2006 (Log Tavern Road). This section was completed in 1999. The second was from Log Tavern Road to State Route 739. Completed in 2003, the project cost $4.5 million and was opened on July 19, 2003. The third improvement area was begun in 2004 from US 209 in Bushkill to due north of Briscoe Mountain Road. This 7.7-mile (12.4 km) part of the project took one year to complete. The fourth and final section, Briscoe Mountain Road to PA 739 began in 2005 and is projected to end in fall of 2007.

== Major junctions ==
The entire route is in Pike County.

Location	mi	km	Destinations	Notes
Lehman Township	0.00	0.00	US 209 (Federal Road)	
Lehman Township			Bushkill Falls Road (SR 2003)	SR 2001 changes from Bushkill Falls Road to Milford Road.
Lehman Township			Briscoe Mountain Road	To Pocono Environmental Education Center
Delaware Township			Wilson Hill Road (SR 2002)	To US 209
Delaware Township			Silver Lake Road (SR 2004)	To PA 739
Delaware Township			PA 739 (Dingman's Pike)	
Milford Township			Log Tavern Road (SR 2006)	
Milford Township			Raymondskill Road (SR 2009)	To Raymondskill Falls
Milford Township			Sawkill Road (SR 2011)	
Milford Township			US 6 (West Harford Street)	
1.000 mi = 1.609 km; 1.000 km = 0.621 mi

== See also ==
- Quadrant route
