= Rutherford Run =

Stream in Pennsylvania, USA

Rutherford Run Tributary to East Branch Tunungwant Creek
- Location of Rutherford Run mouth Rutherford Run (the United States)

Location
- Country: United States
- State: Pennsylvania
- County: McKean

Physical characteristics
- Source: Minard Run divide
  - location: about 2 miles southeast of South Bradford, Pennsylvania
  - coordinates: 41°55′9.23″N 078°36′53.09″W
  - elevation: 1,890 ft (580 m)
- Mouth: East Branch Tunungwant Creek
  - location: South Bradford, Pennsylvania
  - coordinates: 41°56′7.23″N 078°38′59.10″W
  - elevation: 1,458 ft (444 m)
- Length: 2.03 mi (3.27 km)
- Basin size: 1.75 square miles (4.5 km^{2})
- Discharge
  - location: East Branch Tunungwant Creek
  - average: 3.52 cu ft/s (0.100 m^{3}/s) at mouth with East Branch Tunungwant Creek

Basin features
- Progression: East Branch Tunungwant Creek → Tunungwant Creek → Allegheny River → Ohio River → Mississippi River → Gulf of Mexico
- River system: Allegheny River
- Tributaries
  - left: unnamed tributaries
  - right: unnamed tributaries
- Bridges: Rutherford Run Road, High Street

Rutherford Run is a 2.03 mi (3.27 km) long first-order tributary to East Branch Tunungwant Creek. This is the only stream of this name in the United States.

== Course ==
Rutherford Run rises about 2 miles (3.2 km) southeast of South Bradford, Pennsylvania, and then flows northwest to meet East Branch Tunungwant Creek at South Bradford, Pennsylvania.

== Watershed ==
Rutherford Run drains 1.75 square miles (4.5 km^{2}) of area, receives about 44.7 in/year (114 cm/year) of precipitation, and is about 89.88% forested.

== See also ==
- List of rivers of Pennsylvania
