= East Branch Tunungwant Creek =

Stream in Pennsylvania, USA

East Branch Tunungwant Creek Tributary to Tunungwant Creek
- Location of East Branch Tunungwant Creek mouth East Branch Tunungwant Creek (the United States)

Location
- Country: United States
- State: Pennsylvania
- County: McKean
- City: Bradford

Physical characteristics
- Source: Panther Run divide
  - location: about 0.5 miles west-southwest of Cyclone, Pennsylvania
  - coordinates: 41°49′43.33″N 078°35′40.09″W
  - elevation: 2,158 ft (658 m)
- Mouth: Tunungwant Creek
  - location: Bradford, Pennsylvania
  - coordinates: 41°57′28.23″N 078°38′29.10″W
  - elevation: 1,421 ft (433 m)
- Length: 12.30 mi (19.79 km)
- Basin size: 58.05 square miles (150.3 km^{2})
- Discharge
  - location: Tunungwant Creek
  - average: 115.57 cu ft/s (3.273 m^{3}/s) at mouth with Tunungwant Creek

Basin features
- Progression: Tunungwant Creek → Allegheny River → Ohio River → Mississippi River → Gulf of Mexico
- River system: Allegheny River
- Tributaries
  - left: Bear Run; Lewis Run; Foster Run; Watrous Run; Sheppard Run
  - right: Railroad Run; Minard Run; Rutherford Run
- Bridges: Droney Road, Main Street, Browntown Road, E Warren Road, Minard Run Road, Owens Way, Elm Street, Main Street

East Branch Tunungwant Creek is a 12.30 mi (19.79 km) long fourth-order tributary to Tunungwant Creek. This is the only stream of this name in the United States.

== Course ==
East Branch Tunungwant Creek rises about 0.5 miles (0.80 km) southwest of Cyclone, Pennsylvania, and then flows generally north to meet Tunungwant Creek at Bradford, Pennsylvania to form Tunungwant Creek with West Branch Tunungwant Creek.

== Watershed ==
East Branch Tunungwant Creek drains 58.05 square miles (150.3 km^{2}) of area, receives about 46.6 in/year (118 cm/year) of precipitation, and is about 81.18% forested.

== See also ==
- List of rivers of Pennsylvania
