= Big Shanty, Pennsylvania =

Unincorporated community in Pennsylvania, US

- Unincorporated community
- Location within Pennsylvania Location within the United States
- Coordinates: 41°50′15″N 78°39′17″W
- Country: United States
- State: Pennsylvania
- County: McKean
- Township: Lafayette
- Elevation: 2,096 ft (639 m)
- Time zone: UTC-5 (Eastern (EST))
  - Summer (DST): UTC-4 (EDT)
- Area code: 814
- GNIS feature ID: 1209422

Big Shanty is an unincorporated community in Lafayette Township, McKean County, Pennsylvania, United States. The community is 2.3 miles (3.7 km) south of Lewis Run; it was once connected to Lewis Run by Pennsylvania Route 823, which is now a county road.
