= Shohola, Pennsylvania =

Unincorporated community in Pennsylvania, US

- Unincorporated community
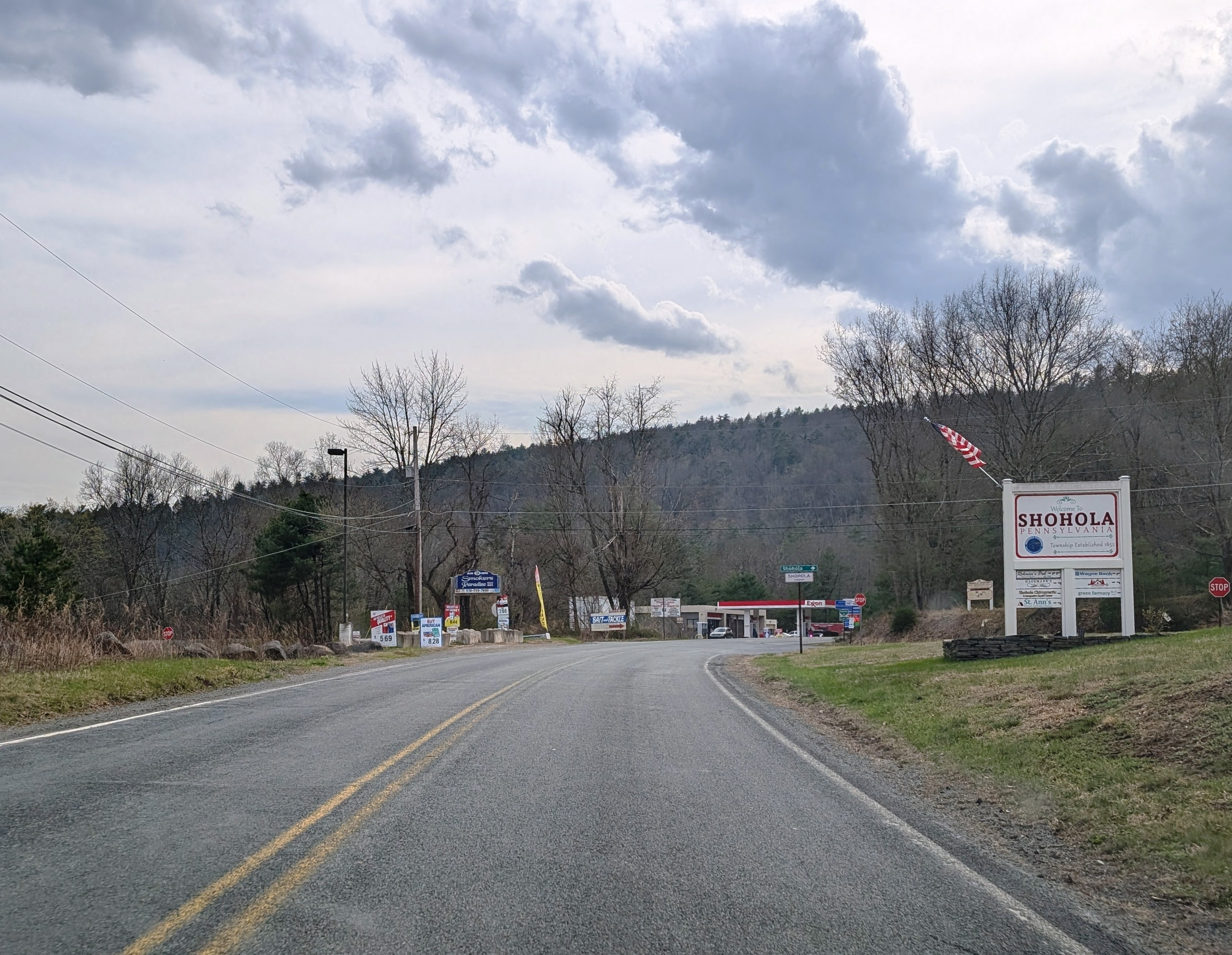
- PA 434 southbound in Shohola

- Location within Pennsylvania
- Coordinates: 41°28′30″N 74°54′55″W
- Country: United States
- State: Pennsylvania
- County: Pike
- Elevation: 636 ft (194 m)
- Time zone: UTC-5 (Eastern (EST))
  - Summer (DST): UTC-4 (EDT)
- ZIP code: 18458
- Area codes: 272 & 570
- GNIS feature ID: 1199528

Shohola is an unincorporated community in Pike County, Pennsylvania, United States. The community is located along Pennsylvania Route 434 at the Delaware River, which forms the state line with New York; Barryville is across the river. Shohola has a post office with ZIP code 18458.
