= Custer City, Pennsylvania =

Unincorporated community in Pennsylvania, US

- Unincorporated community
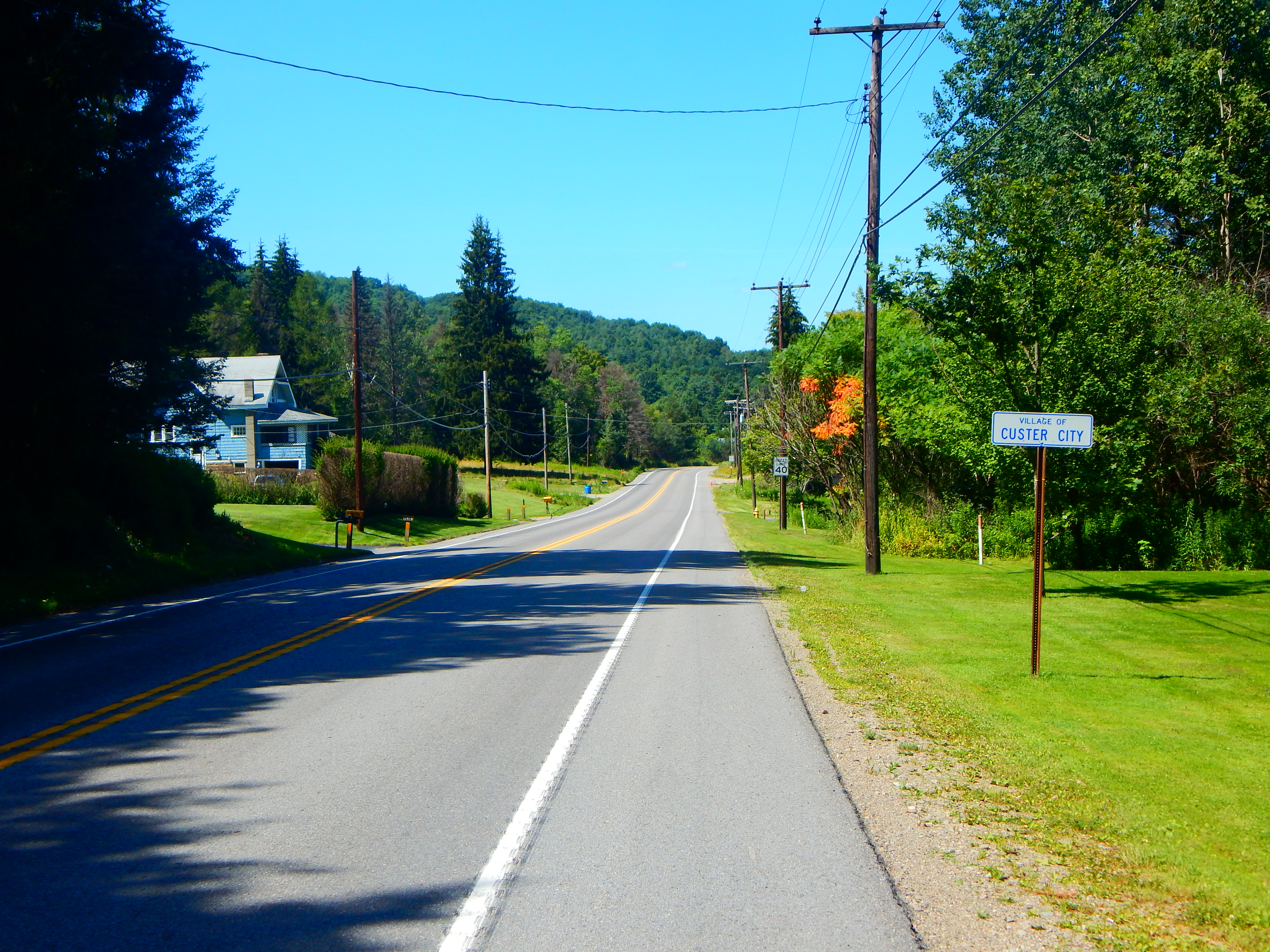
- US 219 entering Custer City

- Location within Pennsylvania Location within the United States
- Coordinates: 41°54′21″N 78°39′06″W
- Country: United States
- State: Pennsylvania
- County: McKean
- Township: Bradford
- Elevation: 1,516 ft (462 m)
- Time zone: UTC-5 (Eastern (EST))
  - Summer (DST): UTC-4 (EDT)
- ZIP code: 16725
- Area code: 814
- GNIS feature ID: 1209541

Custer City is an unincorporated community in McKean County, Pennsylvania, United States. The community is located at the intersection of U.S. Route 219 and Pennsylvania Route 770, 3.6 miles (5.8 km) south of Bradford. Custer City has a post office with ZIP code 16725.
