= Scotch Hill, Pennsylvania =

Unincorporated community in Pennsylvania, US

- Unincorporated community
- Location within Pennsylvania
- Coordinates: 41°19′36″N 79°15′55″W
- Country: United States
- State: Pennsylvania
- County: Clarion
- Township: Farmington

Government
- Elevation: 1,516 ft (462 m)
- Time zone: UTC-5 (Eastern (EST))
  - Summer (DST): UTC-4 (EDT)
- 16233: 16233
- Area code: 814
- GNIS feature ID: 1187152

Scotch Hill is a community that is located in Clarion County, Pennsylvania, United States. It was founded in the nineteenth century by James J. Scotch and William F. Hill.

== History ==
Per The History of Clarion County Pennsylvania, which was edited by A.J. Davis:

"In 1836 George Alsbach, a native of Union county, purchased the Anderson tract for $1,500, and removed to it with his family from Shippenville. The surrounding country north, east, and south was a howling wilderness. Mr.Alsbach soon replaced the two log cabins, and the half barn of the same material, 'which required props to keep it from falling,' by more comfortable and modern frame dwellings. In the spring of 185 1 Mr. Alsbach laid out a portion of his farm in lots and called the prospective village Scotch Hill, to commemorate its former occupant, Anderson, and his neighbor, McNaughton."
