= Bennett Brook (West Branch Tunungwant Creek tributary) =

Stream in Pennsylvania, USA

Bennett Brook Tributary to West Branch Tunungwant Creek
- Location of Bennett Brook mouth Bennett Brook (West Branch Tunungwant Creek tributary) (the United States)

Location
- Country: United States
- State: Pennsylvania
- County: McKean
- City: Bradford

Physical characteristics
- Source: Red House Brook divide
  - location: about 4.5 miles northwest of Bradford, Pennsylvania
  - coordinates: 41°59′59.00″N 078°43′5.00″W
  - elevation: 2,210 ft (670 m)
- Mouth: West Branch Tunungwant Creek
  - location: Bradford, Pennsylvania
  - coordinates: 41°57′16.23″N 078°39′27.10″W
  - elevation: 1,437 ft (438 m)
- Length: 4.46 mi (7.18 km)
- Basin size: 4.57 square miles (11.8 km^{2})
- Discharge
  - location: West Branch Tunungwant Creek
  - average: 9.51 cu ft/s (0.269 m^{3}/s) at mouth with West Branch Tunungwant Creek

Basin features
- Progression: West Branch Tunungwant Creek → Tunungwant Creek → Allegheny River → Ohio River → Mississippi River → Gulf of Mexico
- River system: Allegheny River
- Tributaries
  - left: unnamed tributaries
  - right: unnamed tributaries
- Bridges: Hedgehog Lane, Sullivan Road (x2), Boss Avenue, Willard Avenue, W Washington Street, Barbour Street, Bennett Street

Bennett Brook is a 4.46 mi (7.18 km) long first-order tributary to West Branch Tunungwant Creek.

== Variant names ==
According to the Geographic Names Information System, it has also been known historically as:

- Bennet Brook

== Course ==
Bennett Brook rises about 4.5 miles (7.2 km) northwest of Bradford, Pennsylvania, and then flows southeast to meet West Branch Tunungwant Creek at Bradford, Pennsylvania.

== Watershed ==
Bennett Brook drains 4.57 square miles (11.8 km^{2}) of area, receives about 46.0 in/year (117 cm/year) of precipitation, and is about 80.67% forested.

== See also ==
- List of rivers of Pennsylvania
