= Cocolamus, Pennsylvania =

Village in Pennsylvania, U.S.

Coordinates: 40°38′52″N 77°12′45″W

Cocolamus is a small village in Juniata County, Pennsylvania, United States, situated along the bank of the Cocolamus Creek.
