= U.S. Route 122 =

U.S. Route 122 may refer to:

- U.S. Route 122 (1926–1934) in Delaware, Pennsylvania, and New Jersey, now part of U.S. Route 202
- U.S. Route 122 (1935–1963) in Pennsylvania, now part of Pennsylvania Route 10 and Pennsylvania Route 61
