= Fuller Brook (West Branch Tunungwant Creek tributary) =

Stream in Pennsylvania, USA

Fuller Brook Tributary to West Branch Tunungwant Creek
- Location of Fuller Brook mouth Fuller Brook (West Branch Tunungwant Creek tributary) (the United States)

Location
- Country: United States
- State: Pennsylvania
- County: McKean

Physical characteristics
- Source: Linn Brook divide
  - location: about 6 miles southwest of Bradford, Pennsylvania
  - coordinates: 41°55′21.22″N 078°45′49.12″W
  - elevation: 2,125 ft (648 m)
- Mouth: West Branch Tunungwant Creek
  - location: about 4 miles southwest of Bradford, Pennsylvania
  - coordinates: 41°54′51.22″N 078°42′39.11″W
  - elevation: 1,581 ft (482 m)
- Length: 3.03 mi (4.88 km)
- Basin size: 4.51 square miles (11.7 km^{2})
- Discharge
  - location: West Branch Tunungwant Creek
  - average: 9.96 cu ft/s (0.282 m^{3}/s) at mouth with West Branch Tunungwant Creek

Basin features
- Progression: West Branch Tunungwant Creek → Tunungwant Creek → Allegheny River → Ohio River → Mississippi River → Gulf of Mexico
- River system: Allegheny River
- Tributaries
  - left: unnamed tributaries
  - right: unnamed tributaries
- Waterbodies: unnamed pond
- Bridges: Glendorn Drive

Fuller Brook is a 3.03 mi (4.88 km) long second-order tributary to West Branch Tunungwant Creek.

== Course ==
Fuller Brook rises about 6 miles (9.7 km) southwest of Bradford, Pennsylvania, and then flows east to meet West Branch Tunungwant Creek about 4 miles southwest of Bradford, Pennsylvania.

== Watershed ==
Fuller Brook drains 4.51 square miles (11.7 km^{2}) of area, receives about 47.4 in/year (120 cm/year) of precipitation, and is about 90.07% forested.

== See also ==
- List of rivers of Pennsylvania
