= Marilla Brook =

Stream in Pennsylvania, USA

Marilla Brook Tributary to West Branch Tunungwant Creek
- Location of Marilla Brook mouth Marilla Brook (the United States)

Location
- Country: United States
- State: Pennsylvania
- County: McKean

Physical characteristics
- Source: Linn Brook divide
  - location: about 6 miles southwest of Bradford, Pennsylvania
  - coordinates: 41°55′26.22″N 078°46′43.12″W
  - elevation: 2,120 ft (650 m)
- Mouth: West Branch Tunungwant Creek
  - location: about 1 mile southwest of Bradford, Pennsylvania
  - coordinates: 41°56′29.23″N 078°40′25.10″W
  - elevation: 1,430 ft (440 m)
- Length: 5.66 mi (9.11 km)
- Basin size: 14.71 square miles (38.1 km^{2})
- Discharge
  - location: West Branch Tunungwant Creek
  - average: 30.45 cu ft/s (0.862 m^{3}/s) at mouth with West Branch Tunungwant Creek

Basin features
- Progression: West Branch Tunungwant Creek → Tunungwant Creek → Allegheny River → Ohio River → Mississippi River → Gulf of Mexico
- River system: Allegheny River
- Tributaries
  - left: Gilbert Run
  - right: unnamed tributaries
- Waterbodies: Bradford City Number 3 Reservoir
- Bridges: West Washington Street, Sleepy Hollow Road, Culbertson Lane, Forest Hill Drive, Vernon Lane, Langmaid Lane

Marilla Brook is a 5.66 mi (9.11 km) long third-order tributary to West Branch Tunungwant Creek. This is the only stream of this name in the United States.

== Variant names ==
According to the Geographic Names Information System, it has also been known historically as:

- Marilla Creek

== Course ==
Marilla Brook rises about 6 miles (9.7 km) southwest of Bradford, Pennsylvania, and then flows generally east to meet West Branch Tunungwant Creek about 1-mile southwest of Bradford, Pennsylvania.

== Watershed ==
Marilla Brook drains 14.41 square miles (37.3 km^{2}) of area, receives about 46.7 in/year (119 cm/year) of precipitation, and is about 86.80% forested.

== See also ==
- List of rivers of Pennsylvania
