= Wyola, Pennsylvania =

Unincorporated community in Pennsylvania, U.S.

Coordinates: 40°00′29″N 75°25′07″W

Wyola is an unincorporated community in Delaware County, Pennsylvania, United States. Wyola is located at 40°0'29"N 75°25'8"W. The location is now a traffic circle connecting St. David's Road to Pennsylvania Route 252 near the campus of the Episcopal Academy.

Wyola's entry in the 1894 book Biographical and Historical Cyclopedia of Delaware County, Pennsylvania reads in full, "Wyola has a store, postoffice, and seven houses."
