= Kissem Run =

Stream in Pennsylvania, USA

Kissem Run Tributary to West Branch Tunungwant Creek
- Location of Kissem Run mouth Kissem Run (the United States)

Location
- Country: United States
- State: Pennsylvania
- County: McKean

Physical characteristics
- Source: Watrous Run divide
  - location: about 2 miles northwest of Lewis Run, Pennsylvania
  - coordinates: 41°53′14.00″N 078°41′37.00″W
  - elevation: 2,158 ft (658 m)
- Mouth: West Branch Tunungwant Creek
  - location: about 3 miles northwest of Lewis Run, Pennsylvania
  - coordinates: 41°54′2.22″N 078°42′55.11″W
  - elevation: 1,634 ft (498 m)
- Length: 1.34 mi (2.16 km)
- Basin size: 1.19 square miles (3.1 km^{2})
- Discharge
  - location: West Branch Tunungwant Creek
  - average: 2.70 cu ft/s (0.076 m^{3}/s) at mouth with West Branch Tunungwant Creek

Basin features
- Progression: West Branch Tunungwant Creek → Tunungwant Creek → Allegheny River → Ohio River → Mississippi River → Gulf of Mexico
- River system: Allegheny River
- Tributaries
  - left: unnamed tributaries
  - right: unnamed tributaries
- Bridges: none

Kissem Run is a 1.74 mi (2.80 km) long first-order tributary to West Branch Tunungwant Creek. This is the only stream of this name in the United States.

== Course ==
Kissem Run rises about 2 miles (3.2 km) northwest of Lewis Run, Pennsylvania, and then flows northwest to meet West Branch Tunungwant Creek about 2 miles (3.2 km) northwest of Lewis Run, Pennsylvania.

== Watershed ==
Kissem Run drains 1.19 square miles (3.1 km^{2}) of area, receives about 47.1 in/year (120 cm/year) of precipitation, and is about 97.71% forested.

== See also ==
- List of rivers of Pennsylvania
