= Lewis Run, Pennsylvania =

Borough in Pennsylvania, US

- Borough
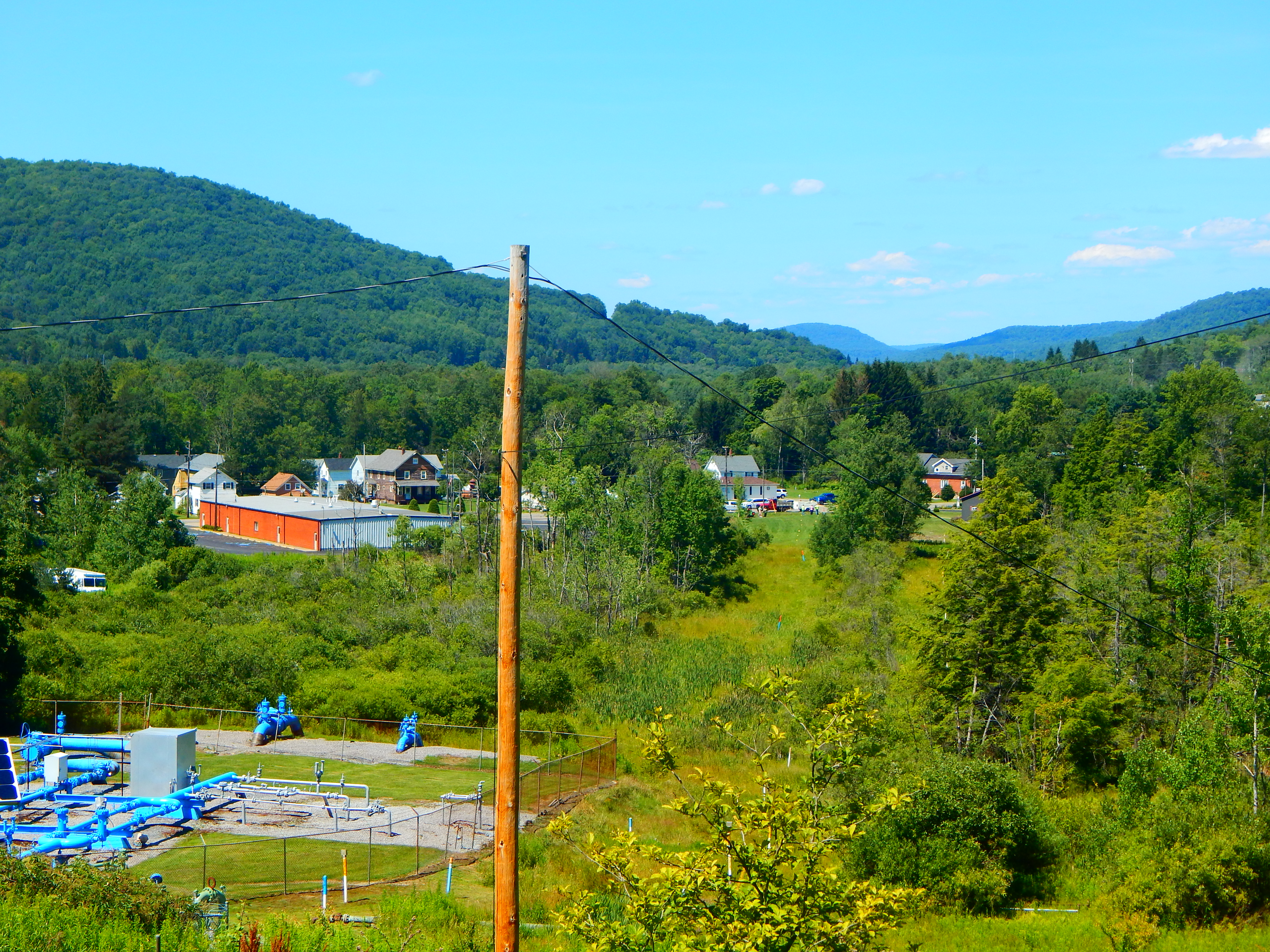
- The borough of Lewis Run from the hills and State Route 4001 (Lafayette Avenue)

- Location in McKean County, Pennsylvania

- Location within Pennsylvania Location within the United States
- Coordinates: 41°52′12″N 78°39′44″W
- Country: United States
- State: Pennsylvania
- County: McKean
- Incorporated: 1911

Area
  - Total: 1.84 sq mi (4.76 km^{2})
  - Land: 1.83 sq mi (4.74 km^{2})
  - Water: 0.012 sq mi (0.03 km^{2})

Population (2020)
  - Total: 583
  - Density: 318.8/sq mi (123.08/km^{2})
- Time zone: UTC-5 (Eastern (EST))
  - Summer (DST): UTC-4 (EDT)
- ZIP code: 16738 (Lewis Run); 16701 (Bradford)
- Area code: 814
- FIPS code: 42-42984
- Website: https://lewis-run-borough.jimdosite.com/

Lewis Run is a borough in McKean County, Pennsylvania, United States. The population was 583 at the 2020 census.

== Demographics ==
Historical population
Census	Pop.	Note	%±
1920	665		—
1930	837		25.9%
1940	844		0.8%
1950	694		−17.8%
1960	714		2.9%
1970	756		5.9%
1980	677		−10.4%
1990	578		−14.6%
2000	577		−0.2%
2010	617		6.9%
2020	583		−5.5%
2021 (est.)	570	▼	−2.2%

As of the census of 2000, there were 577 people, 259 households, and 178 families residing in the borough. The population density was 297.7 inhabitants per square mile (114.9/km^{2}). There were 287 housing units at an average density of 148.1 per square mile (57.2/km^{2}). The racial makeup of the borough was 98.61% White, 0.17% African American, 0.52% Native American, 0.17% Asian, 0.17% from other races, and 0.35% from two or more races. Hispanic or Latino of any race were 0.17% of the population.

There were 259 households, out of which 25.9% had children under the age of 18 living with them, 57.1% were married couples living together, 6.9% had a female householder with no husband present, and 30.9% were non-families. 28.2% of all households were made up of individuals, and 14.3% had someone living alone who was 65 years of age or older. The average household size was 2.23 and the average family size was 2.70.

In the borough the population was spread out, with 19.4% under the age of 18, 6.6% from 18 to 24, 27.0% from 25 to 44, 23.2% from 45 to 64, and 23.7% who were 65 years of age or older. The median age was 43 years. For every 100 females there were 96.9 males. For every 100 females age 18 and over, there were 92.1 males.

The median income for a household in the borough was $35,221, and the median income for a family was $41,719. Males had a median income of $31,042 versus $23,750 for females. The per capita income for the borough was $21,670. About 3.8% of families and 6.5% of the population were below the poverty line, including 8.1% of those under age 18 and 7.5% of those age 65 or over.

== Geography ==
Lewis Run is located northwest of the center of McKean County at 41°52′12″N 78°39′44″W (41.870101, -78.662201). U.S. Route 219 passes through the borough, leading north 6 miles (10 km) to Bradford, the largest community in the county, and south 36 miles (58 km) to Ridgway.

According to the U.S. Census Bureau, Lewis Run has a total area of 1.84 square miles (4.8 km^{2}), of which 0.01 square miles (0.03 km^{2}), or 0.60%, are water. The borough is in the valley of the East Branch of Tunungwant Creek, where it is joined from the southwest by Lewis Run. The East Branch continues north to join the West Branch in Bradford, and Tunungwant Creek continues north to flow into the Allegheny River in Carrollton, New York.

=== Climate ===
According to the Köppen Climate Classification system, Lewis Run has a humid continental climate, abbreviated "Dfb" on climate maps.

Climate data for Lewis Run, Pennsylvania
Month	Jan	Feb	Mar	Apr	May	Jun	Jul	Aug	Sep	Oct	Nov	Dec	Year
Mean daily maximum °C (°F)	−1 (31)	1 (33)	6 (43)	13 (56)	20 (68)	24 (76)	26 (79)	25 (77)	22 (71)	16 (60)	8 (46)	2 (35)	13 (56)
Mean daily minimum °C (°F)	−11 (13)	−11 (13)	−6 (21)	−1 (31)	5 (41)	10 (50)	12 (54)	12 (53)	8 (46)	2 (36)	−2 (28)	−8 (18)	1 (34)
Average precipitation mm (inches)	79 (3.1)	66 (2.6)	86 (3.4)	94 (3.7)	100 (4.1)	120 (4.9)	120 (4.7)	100 (4)	110 (4.2)	94 (3.7)	99 (3.9)	89 (3.5)	1,160 (45.8)
Source: Weatherbase

== Education ==
It is in the Bradford Area School District.
