= List of places in Pennsylvania: B =

This list of cities, towns, unincorporated communities, counties, and other recognized places in the U.S. state of Pennsylvania also includes information on the number and names of counties in which the place lies, and its lower and upper zip code bounds, if applicable.

Name of place	Number of counties	Principal county	Lower zip code	Upper zip code
Bachmanville	1	Dauphin County	17033	
Back Mountain	1	Luzerne County		
Backup Corners	1	Warren County		
Backus	1	McKean County		
Bacon Mill	1	York County		
Bacton	1	Chester County		
Baden	1	Beaver County	15005	
Baederwood	1	Montgomery County	19046	
Bagdad	1	Erie County		
Bagdad	1	Westmoreland County	15656	
Baggaley	1	Westmoreland County	15650	
Baidland	1	Washington County	15063	
Bailey	1	Perry County	17074	
Baileys Corner	1	Bradford County	16926	
Baileyville	1	Centre County	16865	
Bainbridge	1	Lancaster County	17502	
Bair	1	York County	17405	
Bairdford	1	Allegheny County	15006	
Bairdstown	1	Westmoreland County		
Baker	1	Chester County		
Baker	1	Washington County		
Baker Station	1	Chester County	19390	
Baker Station	1	Washington County		
Bakers Crossroad	1	Cambria County	16668	
Bakers Summit	1	Bedford County	16614	
Bakerstown	1	Allegheny County	15007	15044
Bakersville	1	Somerset County	15501	
Bakerton	1	Cambria County		
Bala	1	Montgomery County	19004	
Bala-Cynwyd	1	Montgomery County	19004	
Bald Eagle	1	Blair County	16686	
Bald Eagle	1	York County		
Bald Eagle Township	1	Clinton County		
Bald Hill	1	Clearfield County	16850	
Bald Hill	1	Greene County		
Bald Hill Church	1	Greene County		
Baldwin	1	Allegheny County	15234	
Baldwin	1	Butler County		
Baldwin	1	Delaware County	19013	
Baldwin Furnace	1	Westmoreland County		
Baldwin Township	1	Allegheny County	15234	
Balliet	1	Carbon County		
Balliettsville	1	Lehigh County	18037	
Balls Mills	1	Lycoming County	17728	
Balltown	1	Forest County		
Bally	1	Berks County	19503	
Balsam	1	Tioga County		
Balsinger	1	Fayette County	15484	
Bamford	1	Lancaster County	17538	
Banard Town	1	Beaver County	15010	
Bandana	1	York County		
Banetown	1	Washington County	15301	
Baney Settlement	1	Clearfield County		
Banfield	1	Armstrong County		
Bangor	1	Northampton County	18013	
Banian Junction	1	Clearfield County	16661	
Banks Township	1	Carbon County		
Banks Township	1	Indiana County		
Banksville	1	Allegheny County		
Banner Ridge	1	Clearfield County	15757	
Bannerville	1	Snyder County	17841	
Banning	1	Fayette County	15428	
Baoba	1	Pike County		
Barbours	1	Lycoming County	17701	
Barclay Township	1	Bradford County		
Bard	1	Bedford County	15534	
Bardwell	1	Wyoming County		
Baresville	1	York County	17331	
Bareville	1	Lancaster County	17540	
Barkeyville	1	Venango County	16038	
Barlow	1	Adams County	17325	
Barlow Heights	1	Montgomery County		
Barlow Knoll	1	Adams County		
Barmouth	1	Montgomery County	19004	
Barnards	1	Armstrong County	16222	
Barners Hill	1	Westmoreland County		
Barnes	1	Cambria County	15737	
Barnes	1	Jefferson County		
Barnes	1	Warren County	16347	
Barnesboro	1	Cambria County	15714	
Barnes Gap	1	Fulton County		
Barneston	1	Chester County	19344	
Barnesville	1	Schuylkill County	18214	
Barnett	1	Huntingdon County		
Barnett Township	1	Forest County		
Barnett Township	1	Jefferson County		
Barneytown	1	Huntingdon County	17052	
Barnitz	1	Cumberland County	17013	
Barnsley	1	Chester County	19363	
Barr Township	1	Cambria County		
Barree	1	Huntingdon County	16611	
Barree Township	1	Huntingdon County		
Barren Hill	1	Montgomery County	19444	
Barret Plan	1	Beaver County	15001	
Barrett	1	Clearfield County	16830	
Barrett Township	1	Monroe County		
Barronvale	1	Somerset County	15557	
Barrs Corners	1	Venango County		
Barr Slope	1	Indiana County	15734	
Barrville	1	Mifflin County	17084	
Barry Heights	1	Montgomery County	19401	
Barry Township	1	Schuylkill County		
Bart	1	Lancaster County	17503	
Bart Township	1	Lancaster County		
Barto	1	Berks County	19504	
Barton	1	Indiana County		
Bartonsville	1	Monroe County	18321	
Bartville	1	Lancaster County	17509	
Basket	1	Berks County	19547	
Bassards Corners	1	Northampton County	18038	
Bastress	1	Lycoming County	17701	
Bastress Township	1	Lycoming County		
Bath	1	Northampton County	18014	
Bath Addition	1	Bucks County	19007	
Bath Junction	1	Northampton County		
Bath Manor	1	Bucks County	19007	
Battle Hollow	1	Jefferson County	15851	
Baumgardner	1	Lancaster County	17584	
Baumstown	1	Berks County	19508	
Bausman	1	Lancaster County	17504	
Bavington	1	Washington County	15019	
Baxter	1	Jefferson County	15829	
Bayard Park	1	Northampton County		
Beach Haven	1	Luzerne County	18601	
Beach Lake	1	Wayne County	18405	
Beachdale	1	Somerset County	15542	
Beachly	1	Somerset County		
Beacon Lodge	1	Huntingdon County		
Beale Township	1	Juniata County		
Beallsville	1	Washington County	15313	
Beans Cove	1	Bedford County	21530	
Bear Creek	1	Luzerne County	18602	
Bear Creek Junction	1	Luzerne County		
Bear Creek Lakes	1	Carbon County		
Bear Creek Township	1	Luzerne County		
Bear Creek Village	1	Luzerne County	18602	
Bear Gap	1	Northumberland County	17824	
Bear Lake	1	Warren County	16402	
Bear Lick	1	Franklin County		
Bear Rocks	1	Fayette County	15610	
Bear Swamp	1	Clinton County		
Bear Valley	1	Northumberland County	17872	
Bears Crossroads	1	Cumberland County		
Beartown	1	Franklin County	17268	
Beartown	1	Lancaster County	17555	
Beatty	1	Westmoreland County	15650	
Beatty Hills	1	Delaware County	19008	
Beaufort Farms	1	Dauphin County	17110	
Beaumont	1	Wyoming County	18618	
Beautiful	1	Franklin County		
Beaver	1	Beaver County	15009	
Beaver Brook	1	Luzerne County	18201	
Beaver Center	1	Crawford County	16406	
Beaver Dam	1	Erie County	16407	
Beaver Falls	1	Beaver County	15010	
Beaver Lake	1	Lycoming County	17758	
Beaver Meadow Colliery	1	Carbon County		
Beaver Meadows	1	Carbon County	18216	
Beaver Springs	1	Snyder County	17812	
Beaver Township	1	Clarion County		
Beaver Township	1	Columbia County		
Beaver Township	1	Crawford County		
Beaver Township	1	Jefferson County		
Beaver Township	1	Snyder County		
Beaver Valley	1	Cambria County	16640	
Beaver Valley	1	Columbia County		
Beaverdale	1	Cambria County	15921	
Beaverdale	1	Northumberland County	17851	
Beaverdale-Lloydell	1	Cambria County		
Beaverdam	1	Centre County		
Beavers Mill	1	Berks County		
Beavertown	1	Blair County	16662	
Beavertown	1	Huntingdon County	16685	
Beavertown	1	Snyder County	17813	
Beavertown	1	York County	17019	
Beccaria	1	Clearfield County	16616	
Beccaria Township	1	Clearfield County		
Bechtelsville	1	Berks County	19505	
Beckersville	1	Berks County	19540	
Becks	1	Schuylkill County	17901	
Becks Cut	1	Somerset County		
Becks Run	1	Allegheny County		
Beckville	1	Schuylkill County		
Bedford	1	Bedford County	15522	
Bedford Township	1	Bedford County		
Bedford Springs	1	Bedford County		
Bedford Valley	1	Bedford County		
Bedminster	1	Bucks County	18910	
Bedminster Township	1	Bucks County		
Bedminster Village	1	Bucks County		
Beech Creek	1	Clinton County	16822	
Beech Creek Township	1	Clinton County		
Beech Flats	1	Bradford County	17724	
Beech Glen	1	Sullivan County	17758	
Beech Grove	1	Elk County		
Beech Grove	1	Lycoming County		
Beech Grove	1	Wayne County		
Beechersville	1	Adams County	17307	
Beechton	1	Jefferson County		
Beechtree	1	Jefferson County	15824	
Beechview	1	Allegheny County		
Beechwood	1	Cameron County	15834	
Beechwood	1	Delaware County	19083	
Beechwood Park	1	Delaware County	19014	
Beechwoods	1	Jefferson County		
Beegleton	1	Bedford County		
Beeman	1	Tioga County		
Beersville	1	Northampton County	18067	
Beesons	1	Fayette County	15445	
Beham	1	Washington County	15376	
Bela	1	Clarion County	16049	
Belair Park	1	Lancaster County	17601	
Belardy	1	Bucks County	19007	
Belden	1	Bedford County	15522	
Belfast	1	Northampton County	18064	
Belfast Junction	1	Northampton County	18042	
Belfast Township	1	Fulton County		
Belford	1	Clearfield County		
Belfry	1	Montgomery County		
Belian Village	1	Lackawanna County	18507	
Belknap	1	Armstrong County	16222	
Bell Acres	1	Allegheny County	15143	
Bell Mountain	1	Lackawanna County	18508	
Bell Point	1	Westmoreland County	15613	
Bell Road	1	Philadelphia County		
Bell Township	1	Clearfield County		
Bell Township	1	Jefferson County		
Bell Township	1	Westmoreland County		
Bella Vista	1	Lycoming County	17754	
Bellaire	1	Lancaster County	17022	
Bellasylva	1	Wyoming County		
Belle Valley	1	Erie County	16509	
Belle Vernon	1	Fayette County	15012	
Bellefonte	1	Centre County	16823	
Bellegrove	1	Lebanon County	17003	
Bellemont	1	Lancaster County	17562	
Belleview Heights	1	Erie County		
Belleville	1	Mifflin County	17004	
Bellevue	1	Allegheny County	15202	
Bellevue	1	York County		
Bellfield	1	Washington County		
Bellrun	1	McKean County	14721	
Bells	1	Westmoreland County		
Bells Camp	1	McKean County		
Bells Landing	1	Clearfield County	15757	
Bells Mills	1	Jefferson County	15767	
Bellton	1	Beaver County		
Belltown	1	Elk County		
Belltown	1	Mifflin County	17841	
Bellwood	1	Blair County	16617	
Belmar	1	Allegheny County		
Belmar	1	Venango County		
Belmar Park	1	Lawrence County		
Belmont	1	Cambria County	15904	
Belmont	1	Philadelphia County		
Belmont Corner	1	Wayne County	18453	
Belmont Hills	1	Bucks County	19020	
Belmont Hills	1	Montgomery County		
Belmont Homes	1	Cambria County	15904	
Belmont Terrace	1	Montgomery County	19406	
Belsano	1	Cambria County	15922	
Belsena Mills	1	Clearfield County	16661	
Belt Line Junction	1	Berks County		
Belton	1	Beaver County	16117	
Beltzhoover	1	Allegheny County		
Beltzville	1	Carbon County		
Ben Avon	1	Allegheny County	15202	
Ben Avon	1	Indiana County	15701	
Ben Avon Heights	1	Allegheny County	15202	
Bencetown	1	Indiana County	15734	
Benders Junction	1	Northampton County		
Bendersville	1	Adams County	17306	
Bendersville Station-Aspers	1	Adams County		
Bendertown	1	Columbia County	17859	
Benedicts	1	York County	17315	
Benezett or Benezette	1	Elk County	15821	
Benezette Township	1	Elk County		
Benfer	1	Snyder County	17812	
Benharts	1	Berks County		
Benjamin	1	Allegheny County		
Benjamin	1	Bucks County	18944	
Benner Township	1	Centre County		
Benroy	1	York County		
Bensalem Township	1	Bucks County	19020	
Bens Creek	2	Cambria County	15905	15938
Bens Creek	2	Somerset County	15905	15938
Benson	1	Somerset County	15935	
Benson East	1	Montgomery County	19046	
Bentley Creek	1	Bradford County	14894	
Bentleyville	1	Washington County	15314	
Benton	1	Columbia County	17814	
Benton	1	Lancaster County		
Benton Air Force Station	1	Columbia County	17814	
Benton Township	1	Columbia County		
Benton Township	1	Lackawanna County		
Benvenue	1	Dauphin County	17020	
Benzinger Township	1	Elk County		
Berge Run	1	Potter County		
Bergers	1	Luzerne County		
Bergey	1	Montgomery County	19438	
Beringer	1	Indiana County		
Berkeley Hills	1	Allegheny County	15237	
Berkley	1	Berks County	19605	
Berkleys Mill	1	Somerset County	15552	
Berkshire Heights	1	Berks County	19610	
Berlin	1	Somerset County	15530	
Berlin Junction	1	Adams County	17350	
Berlin Township	1	Wayne County		
Berlinsville	1	Northampton County	18088	
Bermudian	2	Adams County	17019	
Bermudian	2	York County	17019	
Bern Township	1	Berks County		
Berne	1	Berks County	19526	
Bernharts	1	Berks County	19605	
Bernice	1	Sullivan County	18632	
Bernville	1	Berks County	19506	
Berrysburg	1	Dauphin County	17005	
Berrytown	1	Bradford County	16925	
Bertha	1	Washington County	15021	
Berwick	2	Columbia County	18603	
Berwick	2	Luzerne County	18603	
Berwick Heights	1	Columbia County		
Berwick Township	1	Adams County		
Berwinsdale	1	Clearfield County	16656	
Berwyn	1	Chester County	19312	
Beryl	1	Blair County		
Besco	1	Washington County	15322	
Bessemer	1	Allegheny County	15104	
Bessemer	1	Lawrence County	16112	
Bessemer	1	Westmoreland County	15666	
Bessemer Junction	1	Allegheny County		
Bessemer Terrace	1	Allegheny County	15112	
Best	1	Allegheny County	15122	
Best Station	1	Lehigh County	18080	
Bethany	1	Wayne County	18431	
Bethayres	1	Montgomery County	19006	
Bethel	1	Allegheny County		
Bethel	1	Berks County	19507	
Bethel	1	Cambria County	15931	
Bethel	1	Mercer County	16159	
Bethel	1	Sullivan County		
Bethel	1	Wayne County		
Bethel Hill	1	Montgomery County	19446	
Bethel Park	1	Allegheny County	15102	
Bethel Township	1	Armstrong County		
Bethel Township	1	Berks County		
Bethel Township	1	Delaware County		
Bethel Township	1	Fulton County		
Bethel Township	1	Lebanon County		
Bethelboro	1	Fayette County		
Bethesda	1	Lancaster County	17532	
Bethlehem	1	Clearfield County	15757	
Bethlehem	2	Lehigh County	18015	18
Bethlehem	2	Northampton County	18015	18
Bethlehem Annex	1	Northampton County	18017	
Bethlehem Junction	1	Lehigh County		
Bethlehem Township	1	Northampton County		
Bethlehem View	1	Northampton County		
Bethton	1	Bucks County	18964	
Betula	1	McKean County	16749	
Betz	1	Clearfield County		
Betzwood	1	Montgomery County	19401	
Beuchler	1	Schuylkill County		
Beula	1	Cambria County		
Beulah	1	Allegheny County	15145	
Beulah	1	Clearfield County	16671	
Beulah Land	1	Lycoming County		
Beurys Lake	1	Schuylkill County		
Beverly	1	Lancaster County		
Beverly Estates	1	Lancaster County	17601	
Beverly Heights	1	Lebanon County	17042	
Beverly Hills	1	Blair County	16601	
Beverly Hills	1	Delaware County		
Beyer	1	Indiana County	16211	
Biddle	1	Westmoreland County	15692	
Bidwell	1	Fayette County		
Bidwell Hill	1	Wayne County		
Biesecker Gap	1	Franklin County	17268	
Big Beaver	1	Beaver County	15010	
Big Beaver Township	1	Lawrence County		
Big Bend	1	Mercer County		
Big Bend	1	Warren County		
Big Cove Tannery	1	Fulton County	17212	
Big Creek	1	Carbon County	18235	
Big Meadow Run	1	Fayette County		
Big Mine Run	1	Schuylkill County		
Big Mine Run Junction	1	Schuylkill County	17921	
Bigmount	1	York County	17315	
Big Mountain	1	Northumberland County		
Big Mountain	1	York County		
Big Pond	1	Bradford County	16914	
Big Run	1	Centre County		
Big Run	1	Dauphin County	17048	
Big Run	1	Jefferson County	15715	
Big Run Branch Junction	1	Lawrence County		
Big Run Junction	1	Jefferson County		
Big Shanty	1	McKean County	16738	
Big Spring	1	Centre County		
Big Spring	1	Cumberland County		
Big Spring	1	Franklin County		
Bilger's Rocks	1	Clearfield County		
Biggertown	1	Lycoming County	17774	
Bigler	1	Clearfield County	16825	
Bigler Township	1	Clearfield County		
Biglerville	1	Adams County	17307	
Billing	1	Clarion County		
Billmeyer	1	Lancaster County		
Bingen	1	Northampton County	18015	
Bingham	1	McKean County	16738	
Bingham Center	1	Potter County	16948	
Bingham Township	1	Potter County		
Binnstown	1	Washington County	15147	
Bino	1	Franklin County	17225	
Birch	1	Clinton County		
Birch Acres	1	Monroe County		
Birch Valley	1	Bucks County		
Birchardville	1	Susquehanna County	18801	
Birchrunville	1	Chester County	19421	
Birchtown	1	Susquehanna County		
Birchwood Lakes	1	Pike County		
Birdell	1	Chester County		
Bird-in-Hand	1	Lancaster County	17505	
Birdsboro	1	Berks County	19508	
Birdville	1	Allegheny County	15065	
Birdville	1	Huntingdon County	17052	
Birmingham	1	Chester County	19380	
Birmingham	1	Huntingdon County	16686	
Birmingham Township	1	Chester County		
Birmingham Township	1	Delaware County		
Bishop	1	Washington County	15321	
Bishtown	1	Clearfield County	16881	
Bismarck	1	Lebanon County		
Bitner	1	Fayette County	15431	
Bittersville	1	York County	17366	
Bittinger	1	Adams County		
Bittners Mill	1	Somerset County		
Bitumen	1	Clinton County	17778	
Bixler	1	Perry County	17047	
Black	1	Bradford County	18848	
Black Ash	1	Crawford County	16327	
Black Baron	1	Lancaster County		
Black Bear	1	Berks County	19606	
Black Creek Township	1	Luzerne County		
Black Creek Junction	1	Carbon County	18255	
Black Diamond	1	Washington County	15063	
Black Horse	1	Delaware County	19063	
Black Horse	1	Montgomery County	19401	
Black Horse Tavern	1	Adams County		
Black Lick	1	Indiana County	15716	
Black Lick Township	1	Indiana County		
Black Ridge	1	Allegheny County	15235	
Black Township	1	Somerset County		
Black Walnut	1	Wyoming County	18623	
Blackburn	1	Westmoreland County	15085	
Blackfield	1	Somerset County		
Blackgap	1	Franklin County	17222	
Blackhawk	1	Beaver County	15010	
Blackhorse	1	Chester County	19365	
Blacklick Township	1	Cambria County		
Blacklog	1	Juniata County		
Blackman	1	Luzerne County	18702	
Blackrock	1	York County	17329	
Blacks	1	Venango County		
Blacks Corner	1	Crawford County	16335	
Blackstone	1	Westmoreland County		
Blacksville	1	Greene County		
Blacktown	1	Mercer County	16137	
Blackwell	1	Tioga County	16938	
Blackwood	1	Schuylkill County		
Blain	1	Perry County	17006	
Blain City	1	Clearfield County	16627	
Blain City-Rosebud	1	Clearfield County		
Blaine Township	1	Washington County		
Blaine Hill	1	Allegheny County	15037	
Blainsburg	1	Washington County	15418	
Blainsport	1	Lancaster County	17569	
Blair Township	1	Blair County		
Blairfour	1	Blair County		
Blairs	1	Clarion County	16232	
Blairs Corners	1	Clarion County		
Blairs Mills	1	Huntingdon County	17213	
Blairsville	1	Indiana County	15717	
Blairtown	1	Greene County	15370	
Blaisdell Junction	1	Jefferson County		
Blakely	1	Lackawanna County	18447	
Blakes	1	Tioga County	16912	
Blakeslee	1	Monroe County	18610	
Blanchard	1	Allegheny County	15084	
Blanchard	1	Centre County	16826	
Blanco	1	Armstrong County	16249	
Blandburg	1	Cambria County	16619	
Blandon	1	Berks County	19510	
Blanket Hill	1	Armstrong County	16201	
Blawnox	1	Allegheny County	15238	
Bleakley Hill	1	Venango County		
Bliem Corners	1	Luzerne County		
Bloom Township	1	Clearfield County		
Bloomfield	1	Allegheny County	15224	
Bloomfield	1	Perry County	17068	
Bloomfield Township	1	Bedford County		
Bloomfield Township	1	Crawford County		
Blooming Glen	1	Bucks County	18911	
Blooming Grove	1	Pike County	18428	
Blooming Grove Township	1	Pike County		
Blooming Grove	1	York County	17331	
Blooming Valley	1	Crawford County	16335	
Bloomingdale	1	Carbon County	18250	
Bloomingdale	1	Lancaster County	17601	
Bloomingdale	1	Luzerne County	18655	
Bloomington	1	Clearfield County	16833	
Bloomington	1	Lackawanna County	18444	
Bloomsburg	1	Berks County		
Bloomsburg	1	Columbia County	17815	
Bloomsdale Gardens	1	Bucks County	19057	
Bloserville	1	Cumberland County	17241	
Bloss Township	1	Tioga County		
Blossburg	1	Tioga County	16912	
Blosser Hill	1	Fayette County	15451	
Blossom Hill	1	Lancaster County	17601	
Blossom Valley	1	Lancaster County	17601	
Blough	1	Somerset County	15936	
Blowtown	1	Jefferson County		
Blue Ball	1	Clearfield County		
Blue Ball	1	Lancaster County	17506	
Blue Bell	1	Montgomery County		
Blue Bell	1	Montgomery County	19422	
Blue Bell Farms	1	Montgomery County	19422	
Blue Bell Gardens	1	Montgomery County	19422	
Blue Goose	1	Cambria County		
Blue Goose Mine	1	Clarion County	16049	
Blue Hill	1	Snyder County	17870	
Blue Jay	1	Forest County	16347	
Blue Knob	1	Blair County	16635	
Blue Marsh	1	Berks County	19608	
Blue Mountain Camps	1	Monroe County	18301	
Blue Mountain Pines	1	Monroe County		
Blue Ridge	1	Bucks County		
Blue Ridge	1	Franklin County		
Blue Ridge Summit	1	Franklin County	17214	
Bluestone	1	Lycoming County		
Bluff	1	Greene County	15354	
Blystone Mill	1	Crawford County	16403	
Blythe Township	1	Schuylkill County		
Blytheburn	1	Luzerne County	18707	
Blythedale	1	Allegheny County	15018	
Blythewood	1	Bucks County	18901	
Boalsburg	1	Centre County	16827	
Boardman	1	Clearfield County	16863	
Bobbys Corners	1	Mercer County		
Bobtown	1	Greene County	15315	
Bocktown	1	Beaver County		
Bodine	1	Lycoming County		
Bodines	1	Lycoming County	17722	
Boeckel Landing	1	York County		
Boggs	1	Allegheny County		
Boggs Township	1	Armstrong County		
Boggs Township	1	Centre County		
Boggs Township	1	Clearfield County		
Boggstown	1	Franklin County	17221	
Boggsville	1	Armstrong County	16055	
Bogus Corners	1	Erie County		
Bohemia	1	Pike County	18428	
Bohrmans Mill	1	Schuylkill County	17972	
Boiling Springs	1	Cumberland County	17007	
Bolivar	1	Westmoreland County	15923	
Bolivar Run	1	McKean County	16701	
Boltz	1	Indiana County	15954	
Bonair	1	Bucks County	18974	
Bon Air	1	Cambria County	15909	
Bon Air	1	Delaware County	19083	
Bon Aire	1	Butler County	16001	
Bondsville	1	Chester County	19335	
Bon Meade	1	Allegheny County	15108	
Bonnair	1	York County	17327	
Bonneauville	1	Adams County	17325	
Bonnie Brook	1	Butler County		
Bonny Brook	1	Cumberland County	17013	
Bonnymeade	1	Washington County		
Bonus	1	Butler County	16049	
Booher Corners	1	Mercer County		
Booker	1	Clearfield County		
Boone	1	Somerset County		
Booneville	1	Clinton County	17747	
Boon Terrace	1	Washington County	15342	
Booths Corner	1	Delaware County	19061	
Boothwyn	1	Delaware County	19061	
Boothwyn Highlands	1	Delaware County	19061	
Boot Jack	1	Elk County		
Boquet	1	Westmoreland County	15644	
Bordell	1	McKean County		
Border	1	Somerset County		
Bordnersville	1	Lebanon County	17038	
Borie	1	Potter County		
Borland Manor	1	Washington County	15317	
Borough	1	Beaver County		
Bortondale	1	Delaware County	19063	
Bossards Corner	1	Northampton County		
Bossardsville	1	Monroe County	18360	
Boston	1	Allegheny County	15135	
Bostonia	1	Clarion County		
Boston Run	1	Schuylkill County	17948	
Boswell	1	Somerset County	15531	
Botts	1	York County	17403	
Boulevard	1	Philadelphia County	19149	
Boulevard Manor	1	Luzerne County		
Bouquet	1	Allegheny County		
Bourne	1	Bradford County	18850	
Bourne Mills	1	Bradford County		
Bovard	1	Butler County	16020	
Bovard	1	Westmoreland County	15619	
Bowdertown	1	Indiana County	15724	
Bower	1	Clearfield County		
Bower Hill	1	Allegheny County	15017	
Bower Hill	1	Washington County	15367	
Bowers	1	Berks County	19511	
Bowersville	1	Jefferson County	15767	
Bowest	1	Fayette County		
Bowest Junction	1	Fayette County		
Bowie	1	Mercer County	16133	
Bowling Green	1	Delaware County	19063	
Bowman Addition	1	York County	17331	
Bowman Creek	1	Wyoming County		
Bowmans	1	Schuylkill County	17948	
Bowmansdale	1	Cumberland County	17008	
Bowmans Store	1	York County	17308	
Bowmanstown	1	Carbon County	18030	
Bowmanstown	1	Carbon County	18030	
Bowmansville	1	Lancaster County	17507	
Bowood	1	Fayette County		
Bowood Mines No. 1	1	Fayette County	15478	
Boyce	1	Allegheny County	15241	
Boyd	1	Northumberland County		
Boyds Mills	1	Wayne County	18443	
Boydstown	1	Butler County	16025	
Boydtown	1	Northumberland County	17872	
Boyer	1	Allegheny County		
Boyers	1	Butler County	16020	
Boyers Junction	1	Berks County	19522	
Boyertown	1	Berks County	19512	
Boynton	1	Somerset County	15532	
Brackenridge	1	Allegheny County	15014	
Brackney	1	Susquehanna County	18812	
Braddock	1	Allegheny County	15104	
Braddock	1	Washington County		
Braddock Hills	1	Allegheny County	15221	
Braden Plan	1	Greene County	15322	
Bradenville	1	Westmoreland County	15620	
Bradford	1	McKean County	16701	
Bradford Hills	1	Chester County	19335	
Bradford Regional Airport	1	McKean County	16701	
Bradford Township	1	Clearfield County		
Bradford Township	1	McKean County		
Bradfordwoods	1	Allegheny County	15015	
Bradley Junction	1	Cambria County	15931	
Bradleytown	1	Venango County	16317	
Brady	1	Clarion County		
Brady	1	Clearfield County	15801	
Brady Township	1	Butler County		
Brady Township	1	Clarion County		
Brady Township	1	Clearfield County		
Brady Township	1	Huntingdon County		
Brady Township	1	Lycoming County		
Brady's Bend	1	Armstrong County	16028	
Bradys Bend Township	1	Armstrong County		
Braeburn	1	Westmoreland County	15068	
Brainerd Center	1	Monroe County		
Braintrim Township	1	Wyoming County		
Brallier	1	Bedford County		
Braman	1	Wayne County	12741	
Bramcote	1	Montgomery County	19465	
Branch Dale-New Mines	1	Schuylkill County		
Branch Township	1	Schuylkill County		
Branchdale	1	Schuylkill County	17923	
Branchton	1	Butler County	16021	
Branchville	1	Erie County	16426	
Brandamore	1	Chester County	19316	
Brandon	1	Venango County		
Brandonville	1	Schuylkill County	17967	
Brandt	1	Susquehanna County	18847	
Brandtsville	1	Cumberland County	17055	
Brandy Camp	1	Elk County	15822	
Brandywine Homes	1	Chester County	19320	
Brandywine Manor	1	Chester County	19343	
Brandywine Summit	1	Delaware County	19342	
Brandywine Village	1	Montgomery County	19406	
Brant Hill	1	Greene County		
Bratton Township	1	Mifflin County		
Brave	1	Greene County	15316	
Braznell	1	Fayette County	15442	
Breadysville	1	Bucks County	18974	
Breakneck	1	Fayette County	15425	
Brecknock Township	1	Berks County		
Brecknock Township	1	Lancaster County		
Bredinsburg	1	Venango County		
Bredinville	1	Butler County	16045	
Breedtown	1	Venango County		
Breezewood	1	Allegheny County	15237	
Breezewood	1	Bedford County	15533	
Breezy Corner	1	Berks County	19522	
Breezy Point	1	Fulton County		
Breinigsville	1	Lehigh County	18031	
Brenizer	1	Westmoreland County		
Brent	1	Lawrence County	16156	
Brentwood	1	Allegheny County	15227	
Breslau	1	Luzerne County	18707	
Bressler	1	Dauphin County	17113	
Bressler-Enhaut-Oberlin	1	Dauphin County		
Breton Hills	1	Bucks County	18974	
Bretonville	1	Clearfield County	16612	
Briarbrook	1	Luzerne County	18707	
Briarcliffe	1	Delaware County	19036	
Briar Creek	1	Columbia County	18603	
Briar Creek Township	1	Columbia County		
Briarwood	1	Bucks County	18901	
Brick Church	1	Armstrong County	16226	
Brick Tavern	1	Bucks County	18951	
Bricker Crossroads	1	Butler County		
Brickerville	1	Lancaster County	17543	
Bridesburg	1	Philadelphia County	19137	
Bridge Point	1	Bucks County		
Bridge Valley	1	Bucks County	18925	
Bridgeburg	1	Armstrong County	16210	
Bridgeport	1	Adams County	17307	
Bridgeport	1	Carbon County	18661	
Bridgeport	1	Clearfield County	16833	
Bridgeport	1	Lancaster County	17602	
Bridgeport	1	Montgomery County	19405	
Bridgeport	1	Perry County	17040	
Bridgeport	1	Westmoreland County	15666	
Bridgeton	1	York County	17352	
Bridgeton Township	1	Bucks County		
Bridgetown	1	Bucks County	19047	
Bridgeville	1	Allegheny County	15017	
Bridgewater	1	Beaver County		
Bridgewater	1	Bucks County	19020	
Bridgewater	1	Delaware County		
Bridgewater Farms	1	Delaware County	19014	
Bridgewater Township	1	Susquehanna County		
Brier Hill	1	Fayette County	15415	
Briggsville	1	Luzerne County	18635	
Brighton	1	Delaware County	19082	
Brighton Township	1	Beaver County		
Brightside	1	Bucks County	19007	
Brightwood	1	Allegheny County	15102	
Brilhart	1	York County	17402	
Brinker	1	Butler County		
Brinkerton	1	Clarion County		
Brinkerton	1	Westmoreland County	15601	
Brintons	1	Chester County	19380	
Brintons Corners	1	Beaver County		
Briquette	1	Allegheny County	15110	
Brisbin	1	Clearfield County	16620	
Briscoe Springs	1	Mercer County	16127	
Bristol	1	Bucks County	19007	
Bristol Heights	1	Bucks County	19021	
Bristol Park	1	Bucks County	19021	
Bristol Terrace No. 1	1	Bucks County		
Bristol Terrace No. 2	1	Bucks County		
Bristol Township	1	Bucks County		
Bristoria	1	Greene County	15337	
Brittany Farms-The Highlands	1	Bucks County	18914	
Britton Run	1	Crawford County	16434	
Broad Acres	1	Mercer County	16127	
Broad Axe	1	Montgomery County	19002	
Broad Ford	1	Fayette County	15425	
Broad Street	1	Luzerne County	18201	
Broad Top City	1	Huntingdon County	16621	
Broad Top Township	1	Bedford County		
Broadford Junction	1	Fayette County		
Broadlawn Highlands	1	Allegheny County	15241	
Broadview	1	Allegheny County	15084	
Broadway	1	Luzerne County	18655	
Broadway Manor	1	Bucks County	19007	
Brock	1	Greene County	15362	
Brockie	1	York County	17403	
Brockport	1	Elk County	15823	
Brockton	1	Schuylkill County	17925	
Brockway	1	Jefferson County	15824	
Brockwayville	1	Jefferson County		
Brodbeck	1	York County		
Brodbecks	1	York County	17329	
Brodhead	1	Northampton County	18017	
Brodheadsville	1	Monroe County	18322	
Brogue	1	York County	17309	
Brogueville	1	York County	17322	
Brokenstraw Township	1	Warren County		
Brommerstown	1	Schuylkill County	17922	
Brook	1	Somerset County		
Brook Park	1	Union County	17837	
Brookdale	1	Cambria County	15942	
Brookdale	1	Susquehanna County	18822	
Brookes Mills	1	Blair County	16635	
Brookfield	1	Chester County		
Brookfield	1	Tioga County	16950	
Brookfield Township	1	Tioga County		
Brookhaven	1	Delaware County	19015	
Brookhaven Gardens	1	Delaware County	19015	
Brookland	1	Potter County	16948	
Brookline	1	Allegheny County	15226	
Brookline	1	Delaware County	19083	
Brooklyn	1	Susquehanna County	18813	
Brooklyn	1	Tioga County		
Brooklyn Township	1	Susquehanna County		
Brooks Mill	1	Blair County		
Brookside	1	Allegheny County		
Brookside	1	Cumberland County	17257	
Brookside	1	Erie County	16510	
Brookside	1	Lycoming County	17771	
Brookside	1	Schuylkill County	17963	
Brookside	1	Wyoming County		
Brookside	1	York County	17315	
Brookside Farms	1	Allegheny County	15241	
Brookston	1	Forest County	16347	
Brookthorpe Hills	1	Delaware County	19008	
Brookvale	1	Fayette County	15425	
Brookville	1	Jefferson County	15825	
Brookwater Park	1	Montgomery County	19426	
Brookwood Shaft	1	Clearfield County		
Broomall	1	Delaware County	19008	
Brothersvalley Township	1	Somerset County		
Brotherton	1	Somerset County	15530	
Broughton	1	Allegheny County	15236	
Broughton Hollow	1	Tioga County		
Brown Hill	1	Crawford County		
Brown Mills	1	Franklin County		
Brown Row	1	Fayette County		
Brown Township	1	Lycoming County		
Brown Township	1	Mifflin County		
Brownbacks	1	Chester County	19475	
Browndale	1	Wayne County	18421	
Brownfield	1	Fayette County	15416	
Brownhill	1	Crawford County	16403	
Brownlee	1	Tioga County		
Browns	1	Luzerne County	18641	
Browns Crossroads	1	Armstrong County		
Browns Mill	1	Berks County		
Browns Mill	1	Juniata County		
Browns Run Junction	1	Fayette County		
Brownsburg	1	Bucks County	18938	
Brownsdale	1	Allegheny County		
Brownsdale	1	Butler County	16053	
Brownstone	1	Dauphin County	17036	
Brownstown	1	Armstrong County	15630	
Brownstown	1	Cambria County	15906	
Brownstown	1	Fayette County	15438	
Brownstown	1	Lancaster County	17508	
Brownsville	1	Berks County	19565	
Brownsville	1	Fayette County	15417	
Brownsville	1	Franklin County	17222	
Brownsville	1	Huntingdon County		
Brownsville	1	Schuylkill County	17976	
Brownsville Junction	1	Fayette County	15417	
Brownsville Township	1	Fayette County	15417	
Brownton	1	York County		
Browntown	1	Bradford County	18853	
Browntown	1	Luzerne County	18640	
Browntown	1	Washington County	15312	
Browntown	1	Westmoreland County		
Bruce	1	York County		
Bruceton	1	Allegheny County	15236	
Bruckarts	1	Lancaster County		
Bruin	1	Butler County	16022	
Brumbaugh	1	Bedford County		
Brumbaugh Crossing	1	Huntingdon County	16647	
Brumfieldville	1	Berks County		
Brunnerville	1	Lancaster County	17543	
Brunots Island	1	Allegheny County		
Brush Creek Township	1	Fulton County		
Brush Run	1	Adams County		
Brushmeadway	1	Blair County	16648	
Brushton	1	Allegheny County		
Brushtown	1	Adams County	17331	
Brushtown	1	Cumberland County	17241	
Brush Valley	1	Indiana County	15720	
Brush Valley Township	1	Indiana County		
Brushville	1	Bradford County	18845	
Brushville	1	Susquehanna County	18847	
Bryan	1	Armstrong County	16222	
Bryan	1	Fayette County	15428	
Bryan Hill	1	Indiana County	15701	
Bryan Hill Manor	1	Indiana County		
Bryan Mill	1	Lycoming County	17737	
Bryansville	1	York County	17314	
Bryant	1	Allegheny County	15101	
Bryn Athyn	1	Montgomery County	19009	
Bryn Gweled	1	Bucks County	18966	
Bryn Mawr	1	Allegheny County	15221	
Bryn Mawr	2	Delaware County	19010	
Bryn Mawr	2	Montgomery County	19010	
Bryners	1	Clarion County		
Brysonia	1	Adams County	17307	
Buchanan Summit	1	Franklin County		
Bucher	1	Clearfield County	16661	
Buchers Mills	1	Warren County		
Buck	1	Lancaster County	17566	
Buck Hill Falls	1	Monroe County	18323	
Buck Mountain	1	Carbon County	18255	
Buck Mountain	1	Schuylkill County	18214	
Buck Mountain Colliery	1	Schuylkill County		
Buck Run	1	Chester County	19320	
Buck Run	1	Indiana County	15728	
Buck Run	1	Schuylkill County	17901	
Buck Township	1	Luzerne County		
Buck Valley	1	Fulton County	17267	
Buckeye	1	Westmoreland County	15666	
Buckhorn	1	Cambria County	16613	
Buckhorn	1	Columbia County	17815	
Buckingham	1	Bucks County	18912	18938
Buckingham Township	1	Bucks County		
Buckingham Township	1	Wayne County		
Buckingham Valley	1	Bucks County		
Buckingham Village	1	Bucks County		
Buckman Village	1	Delaware County	19013	
Buckmanville	1	Bucks County	18938	
Buckstown	1	Somerset County	15563	
Bucksville	1	Bucks County	18953	
Bucktoe	1	Bucks County		
Bucktown	1	Chester County	19464	
Budaville	1	Washington County		
Buells Corners	1	Crawford County	16434	
Buena Vista	1	Allegheny County	15018	
Buena Vista	1	Blair County	16686	
Buena Vista	1	Butler County	16025	
Buena Vista	1	Fayette County	15486	
Buena Vista	1	Franklin County	17268	
Buena Vista	1	Lancaster County	17527	
Buena Vista Springs	1	Franklin County	17268	
Buffalo	1	Washington County	15301	
Buffalo Creek	1	Armstrong County		
Buffalo Cross Roads	1	Union County	17837	
Buffalo Mills	1	Armstrong County	16262	
Buffalo Mills	1	Bedford County	15534	
Buffalo Run	1	Centre County	16870	
Buffalo Springs	1	Lebanon County	17042	
Buffalo Township	1	Butler County		
Buffalo Township	1	Perry County		
Buffalo Township	1	Union County		
Buffalo Township	1	Washington County		
Buffalo Valley	1	Armstrong County	16262	
Buffington	1	Fayette County	15468	
Buffington Township	1	Indiana County		
Buhl	1	Mercer County	16146	
Buhls	1	Butler County	16033	
Buhls Station	1	Butler County		
Bulger	1	Washington County	15019	
Bulk Mail Center	1	Allegheny County	15095	
Bullion	1	Venango County	16374	
Bullis Mill	1	McKean County	16731	
Bullskin Township	1	Fayette County		
Bull Tavern	1	Chester County		
Bully Hill	1	Venango County	16323	
Bumpville	1	Bradford County		
Bunches	1	York County	17070	
Bungalow Park	1	Lehigh County	18104	
Bunker Hill	1	Juniata County		
Bunker Hill	1	Lebanon County	17042	
Bunker Hill	1	Schuylkill County	17901	
Bunkertown	1	Juniata County	17049	
Bunola	1	Allegheny County	15020	
Burd Coleman Village	1	Lebanon County	17016	
Burdette	1	Greene County		
Burds Crossing	1	Westmoreland County		
Burgettstown	1	Washington County	15021	
Burholme	1	Philadelphia County		
Burkhelder	1	Somerset County		
Burlington	1	Bradford County	18814	
Burlington Township	1	Bradford County		
Burnham	1	Mifflin County	17009	
Burning Bush	1	Bedford County		
Burning Well	1	McKean County	16735	
Burnside	1	Clearfield County	15721	
Burnside	1	Delaware County	19043	
Burnside	1	Northumberland County	17872	
Burnside Township	1	Centre County		
Burnside Township	1	Clearfield County		
Burnstown	1	Lawrence County	16117	
Burnsville	1	Washington County		
Burnt Cabins	1	Fulton County	17215	
Burnt Mills	1	Chester County		
Burnt Mills	1	Lancaster County		
Burnwood	1	Susquehanna County	18465	
Burrell	1	Westmoreland County		
Burrell Township	1	Armstrong County		
Burrell Township	1	Indiana County		
Burrows	1	Potter County	16922	
Burson Plan	1	Greene County	15322	
Bursonville	1	Bucks County	18077	
Burtville	1	Potter County	16743	
Bush Addition	1	Centre County	16823	
Bush Patch	1	Lackawanna County	18518	
Bushkill	1	Pike County	18324	
Bushkill Center	1	Northampton County	18064	
Bushkill Township	1	Northampton County		
Bustleton	1	Philadelphia County	19115	
Bute	1	Fayette County	15489	
Butler	1	Butler County	16001	
Butler Junction	1	Butler County	16229	
Butler Township	1	Adams County		
Butler Township	1	Butler County		
Butler Township	1	Luzerne County		
Butler Township	1	Schuylkill County		
Butler Transfer	1	Butler County		
Buttermilk Falls	1	Westmoreland County	15658	
Butternut Grove	1	Lycoming County		
Buttonwood	1	Luzerne County	18702	
Buttonwood	1	Lycoming County	17771	
Buttonwood Glen	1	Bucks County	18901	
Buttonwood Manor	1	Bucks County	18901	
Butts	1	Centre County		
Butztown	1	Northampton County	18017	
Buyerstown	1	Lancaster County	17535	
Buzz	1	Greene County		
Byberry	1	Philadelphia County		
Byers	1	Chester County	19480	
Byersdale	1	Beaver County	15005	
Byrnedale	1	Elk County	15827	
Byrnsville	1	Columbia County	17927	
Byromtown	1	Forest County	16239	
Bywood	1	Delaware County	19082	

== See also ==
- List of cities in Pennsylvania
- List of counties in Pennsylvania
