= Bovard, Pennsylvania =

Bovard, Pennsylvania may refer to the following communities in the U.S. state of Pennsylvania:

- Bovard, Butler County, Pennsylvania
- Bovard, Westmoreland County, Pennsylvania
