= Bovard =

Bovard may refer to:

- Bovard, Butler County, Pennsylvania
- Bovard, Westmoreland County, Pennsylvania, an unincorporated community in Westmoreland County
- Bovard Field, a stadium in Los Angeles, California

== People with the name Bovard ==
- Alan Bovard (1906–1983), American football player
- George F. Bovard (1856–1932), American academic administrator
- James Bovard, American journalist
- Marion McKinley Bovard (1847–1891), American academic administrator
