= Bonus =

Bonus commonly means:

- Bonus, a Commonwealth term for a distribution of profits to a with-profits insurance policy
- Bonus payment, an extra payment received as a reward for doing one's job well or as an incentive

Bonus may also refer to:

== Places ==
- Bonus, Pennsylvania
- Bonus, Texas
- 10028 Bonus, a main belt asteroid

== People ==
- Bonus (patrician) (6th-century–627), Byzantine statesman and general, active in the reign of Heraclius
- Bonus (Sirmium), a Byzantine general, active in the reign of Justin II (r. 565–578)
- Petrus Bonus, a physician

== Brands and enterprises ==
- Bónus, an Icelandic supermarket
- TeST TST-14 Bonus, a Czech glider
- Bofors/Nexter Bonus, an artillery round

== Energy ==
- Bonus Energy A/S, a Danish wind turbine manufacturer, later called Siemens Wind Power
- Boiling Nuclear Superheater (BONUS), a decommissioned nuclear facility in Puerto Rico

== Games and sports ==
- Bonus (basketball), a situation wherein one team accumulates a certain number of fouls
- Bonus (Scrabble), a term used in the game Scrabble outside North America, for playing all seven of one's tiles
- Bonus, a type of question in quiz bowl
