= Bonosus =

Bonosus may refer to any of:

- Bonosus (usurper) (fl. 281), a Romano-British naval officer and usurper
- Bonosus of Trier, bishop of Trier (fl. 353-373)
- Bonosus of Naissus, bishop of Naissus (fl. 380)
- Bonosus of Sardica, bishop of Sardica (fl. 391–414), heresiarch of the Bonosians

== See also ==
- Bonus (Sirmium) (fl. 567), a Byzantine general who defended Sirmium during a Gepid invasion erroneously recorded as "Bonosus" in some histories
- Bonus (patrician) (fl. 626), a Byzantine general erroneously recorded as "Bonosus" in some histories
- Bonus (disambiguation)
