= Roxbury, Somerset County, Pennsylvania =

Unincorporated community in Pennsylvania, US

Roxbury, Pennsylvania
- Unincorporated community
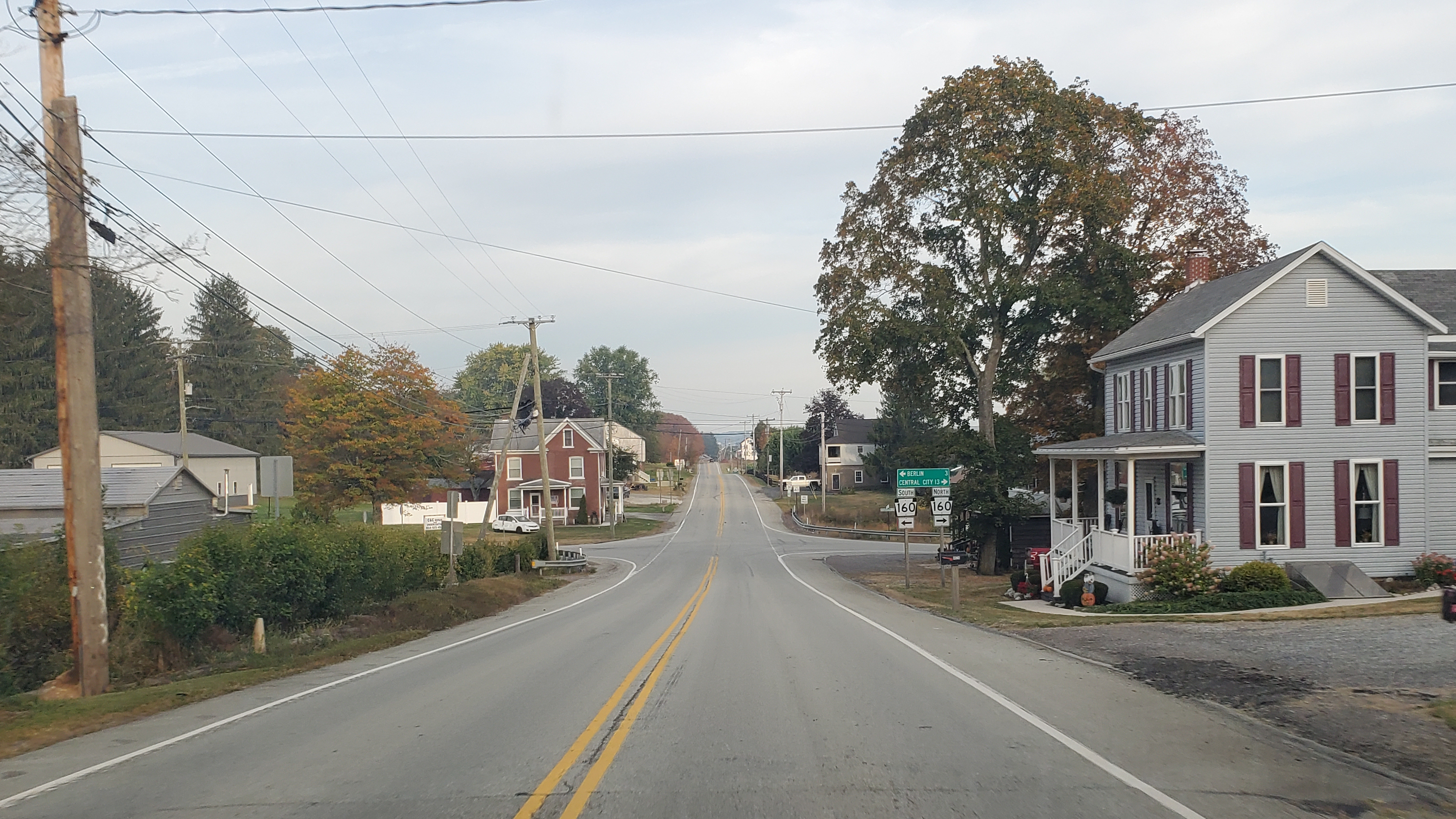
- Looking west along Route 31 in Roxbury

- Location within the state of Pennsylvania Roxbury (the United States)
- Coordinates: 39°56′50.8″N 78°54′17.6″W
- Country: United States
- State: Pennsylvania
- County: Somerset
- Time zone: UTC-5 (Eastern (EST))
  - Summer (DST): UTC-4 (EDT)
- ZIP code(s): 15530 (Berlin)
- Area code: 814
- GNIS feature ID: 1185583

Roxbury is an unincorporated community in Somerset County, Pennsylvania, United States. It lies along the borderof Stonycreek Township and Brothersvalley Township, which is formed by Pennsylvania Route 31 (Glades Pike). It lies at the intersection of Route 31 and Pennsylvania Route 160 (Huckleberry Highway).

About 3 miles to the southwest of Roxbury along Route 160 is Berlin. About 3 miles to the northwest along Route 31 is Brotherton.
