= Horton Township, Elk County, Pennsylvania =

Township in Pennsylvania, United States

Coordinates: 41°22′00″N 78°46′59″W

Horton Township, Pennsylvania
- Township
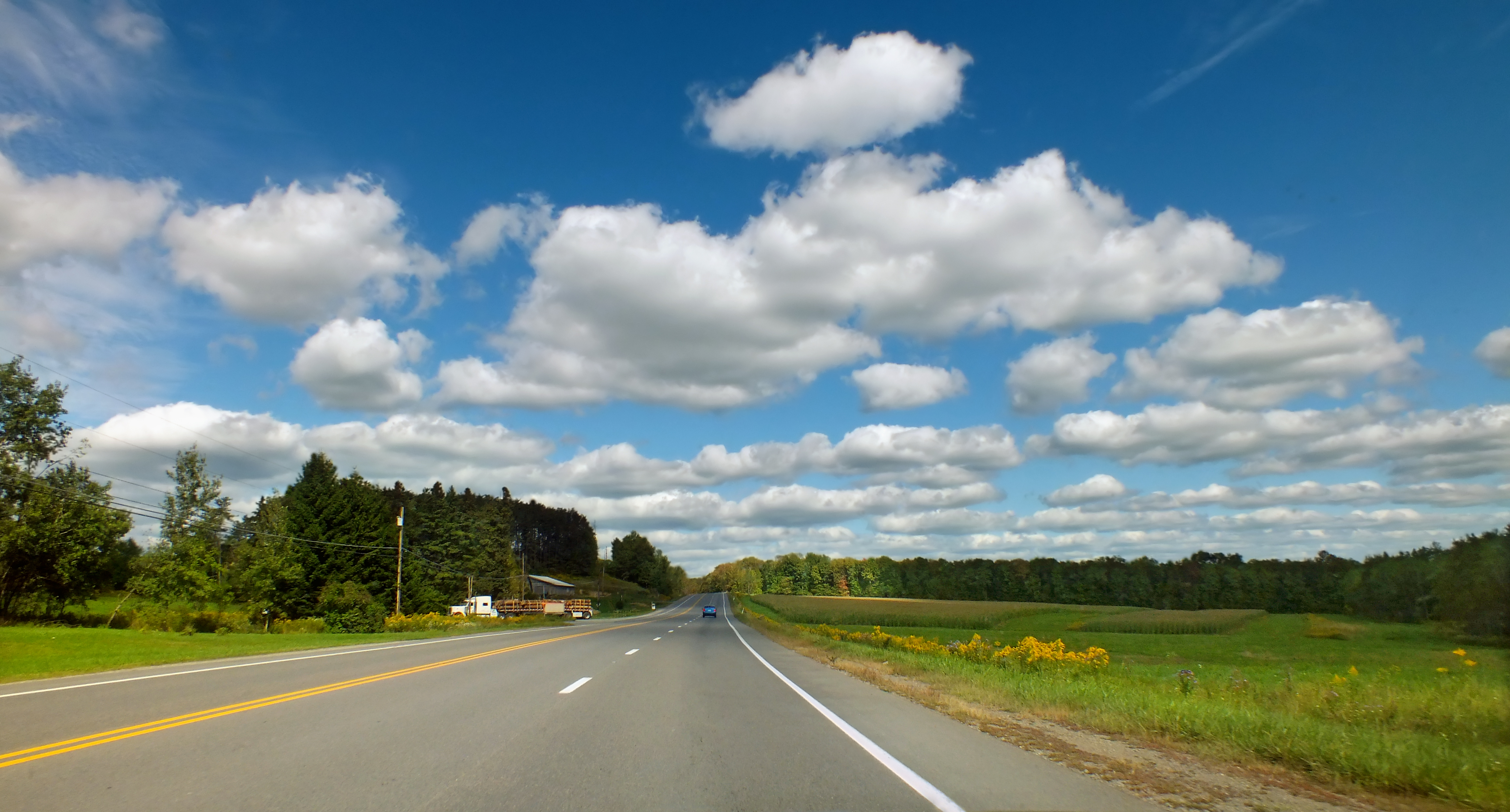
- U.S. Route 219 in the township

- Location in Elk County and the U.S. state of Pennsylvania
- Country: United States
- State: Pennsylvania
- County: Elk
- Settled: 1818
- Incorporated: 1850

Area
  - Total: 57.08 sq mi (147.84 km^{2})
  - Land: 56.99 sq mi (147.61 km^{2})
  - Water: 0.089 sq mi (0.23 km^{2})

Population (2020)
  - Total: 1,365
  - Estimate (2022): 1,338
  - Density: 23.95/sq mi (9.247/km^{2})
- FIPS code: 42-047-35816

Horton Township is a township in Elk County, Pennsylvania, United States. The population was 1,365 at the 2020 census, down from 1,452 in 2010.

== Geography ==
The township is in the south-central part of Elk County, bordered to the southwest by Jefferson County and to the southeast by Clearfield County. According to the United States Census Bureau, the township has a total area of 57.1 square miles (147.8 km^{2}), of which 57.0 square miles (147.6 km^{2}) is land and 0.1 square miles (0.2 km^{2}), or 0.16%, is water. The valley of Little Toby Creek, a tributary of the Clarion River, crosses the township from east to southwest.

Unincorporated communities in Horton Township include Brockport, Cartwright, Shawmut, Horton City, Drummond, Helen Mills, Challenge, Elbon, Brandy Camp, and Beech Grove. U.S. Route 219 crosses the township, leading north to Ridgway, the Elk County seat, and southwest to Brockway in Jefferson County.

== Demographics ==
Historical population
Census	Pop.	Note	%±
2000	1,574		—
2010	1,452		−7.8%
2020	1,365		−6.0%
2022 (est.)	1,338		−2.0%
U.S. Decennial Census

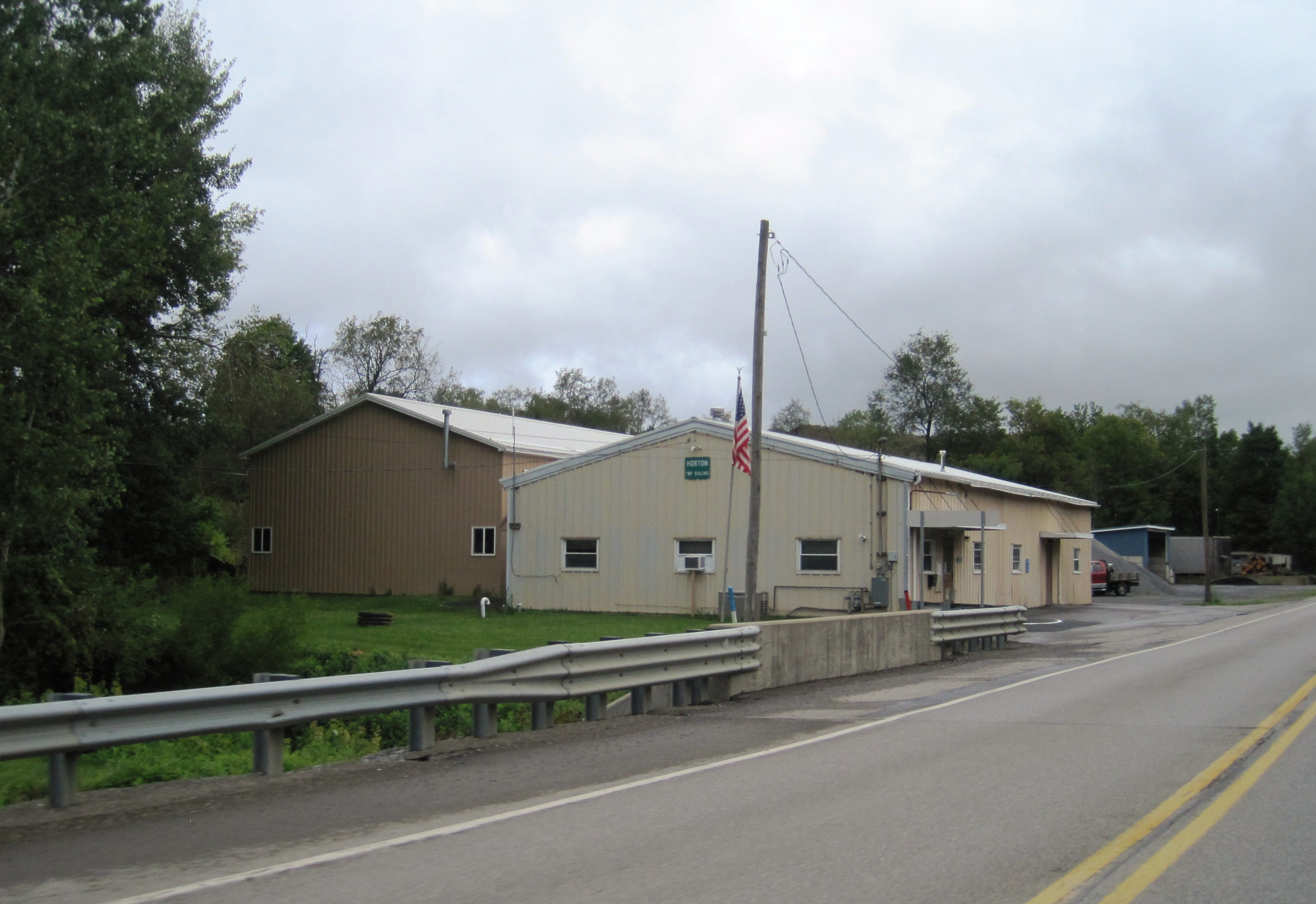
Town hall

As of the census of 2000, there were 1,574 people, 663 households, and 450 families residing in the township. The population density was 27.6 inhabitants per square mile (10.7/km^{2}). There were 768 housing units at an average density of 13.5/sq mi (5.2/km^{2}). The racial makeup of the township was 99.24% White, 0.06% African American, 0.13% Native American, 0.19% Asian, 0.06% Pacific Islander, and 0.32% from two or more races. Hispanic or Latino of any race were 0.06% of the population.

There were 663 households, out of which 27.8% had children under the age of 18 living with them, 57.5% were married couples living together, 6.8% had a female householder with no husband present, and 32.0% were non-families. 28.2% of all households were made up of individuals, and 11.5% had someone living alone who was 65 years of age or older. The average household size was 2.37 and the average family size was 2.92.

In the township the population was spread out, with 22.2% under the age of 18, 8.7% from 18 to 24, 28.7% from 25 to 44, 25.4% from 45 to 64, and 15.0% who were 65 years of age or older. The median age was 40 years. For every 100 females, there were 111.3 males. For every 100 females age 18 and over, there were 104.7 males.

The median income for a household in the township was $34,688, and the median income for a family was $38,964. Males had a median income of $32,286 versus $21,477 for females. The per capita income for the township was $18,189. About 5.3% of families and 7.2% of the population were below the poverty line, including 11.5% of those under age 18 and 5.3% of those age 65 or over.
