= Bowdertown, Pennsylvania =

Populated place in Pennsylvania, US

Coordinates: 40°45′39″N 78°50′52″W

Bowdertown, Pennsylvania, is a populated place in Indiana County, with an elevation of 1,610 feet (491 m).
