= Bigler, Pennsylvania =

Unincorporated community in Pennsylvania, US

- Village/Census-designated place
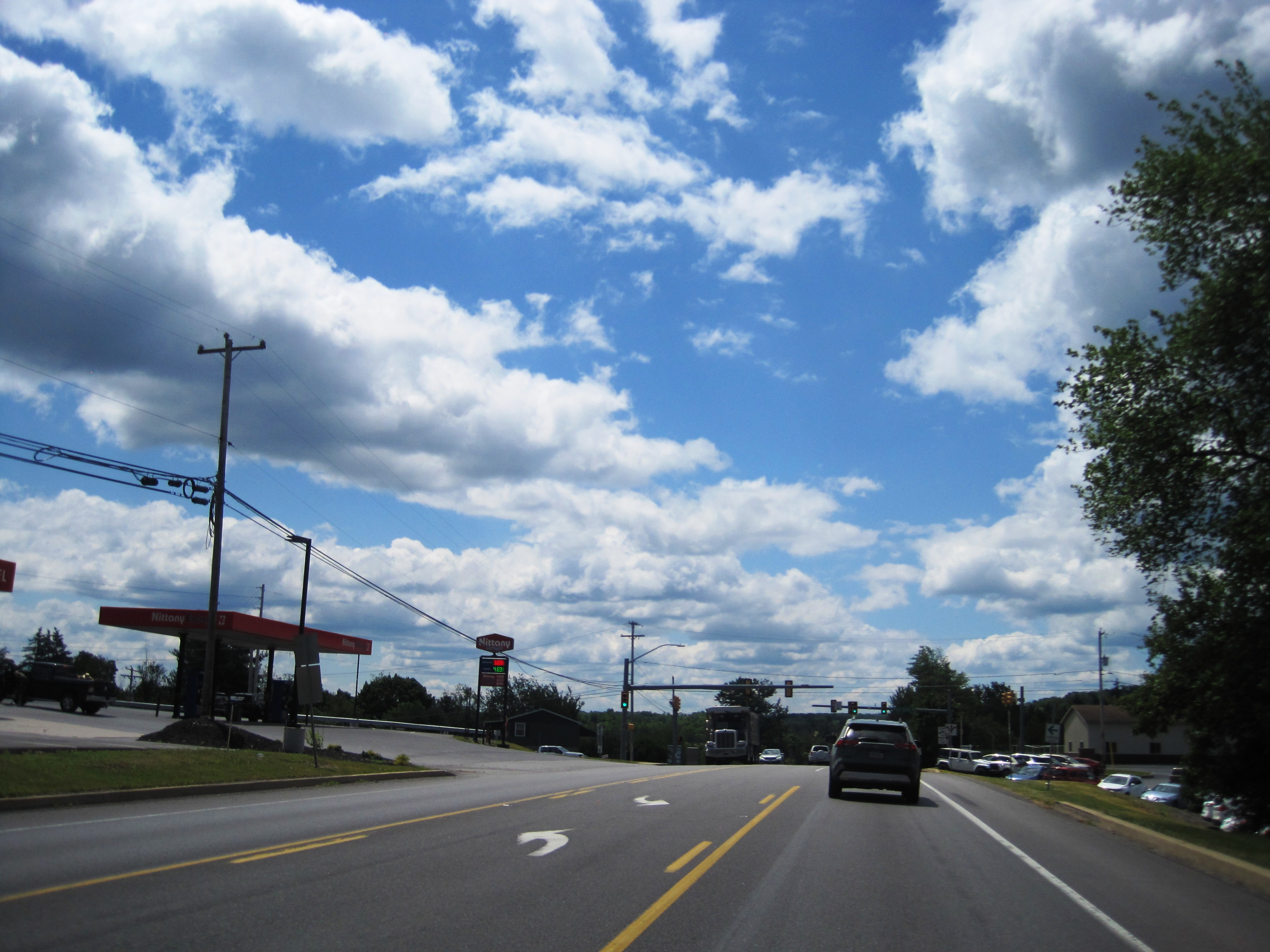
- US 322 eastbound in Bigler

- Location in Pennsylvania Bigler (the United States)
- Coordinates: 40°59′4″N 78°18′23″W
- Country: United States
- State: Pennsylvania
- County: Clearfield
- Township: Bradford

Area
  - Total: 1.22 sq mi (3.15 km^{2})
  - Land: 1.21 sq mi (3.13 km^{2})
  - Water: 0.0077 sq mi (0.02 km^{2})
- Elevation: 1,690 ft (520 m)

Population (2020)
  - Total: 356
  - Density: 294.3/sq mi (113.62/km^{2})
- Time zone: UTC-5 (Eastern (EST))
  - Summer (DST): UTC-4 (EDT)
- ZIP code: 16825
- FIPS code: 42-06280
- GNIS feature ID: 1169612

Bigler is a census-designated place located in Bradford Township, Clearfield County in the state of Pennsylvania. As of the 2020 census, the population was 356.

Its location is 9 miles (14 km) east of Clearfield and 8 miles (13 km) northwest of Philipsburg on U.S. Route 322.

Bigler was originally known as Williams Grove, but was renamed because the mail was being confused with another Williams Grove, in Cumberland County. As Governor William Bigler was from Clearfield, Pennsylvania, the county seat of Clearfield County, Bigler was named after him.

== Demographics ==
Historical population
Census	Pop.	Note	%±
2010	398		—
2020	356		−10.6%
U.S. Decennial Census
