= Brockport, Pennsylvania =

Unincorporated community in Pennsylvania, US

- Unincorporated community
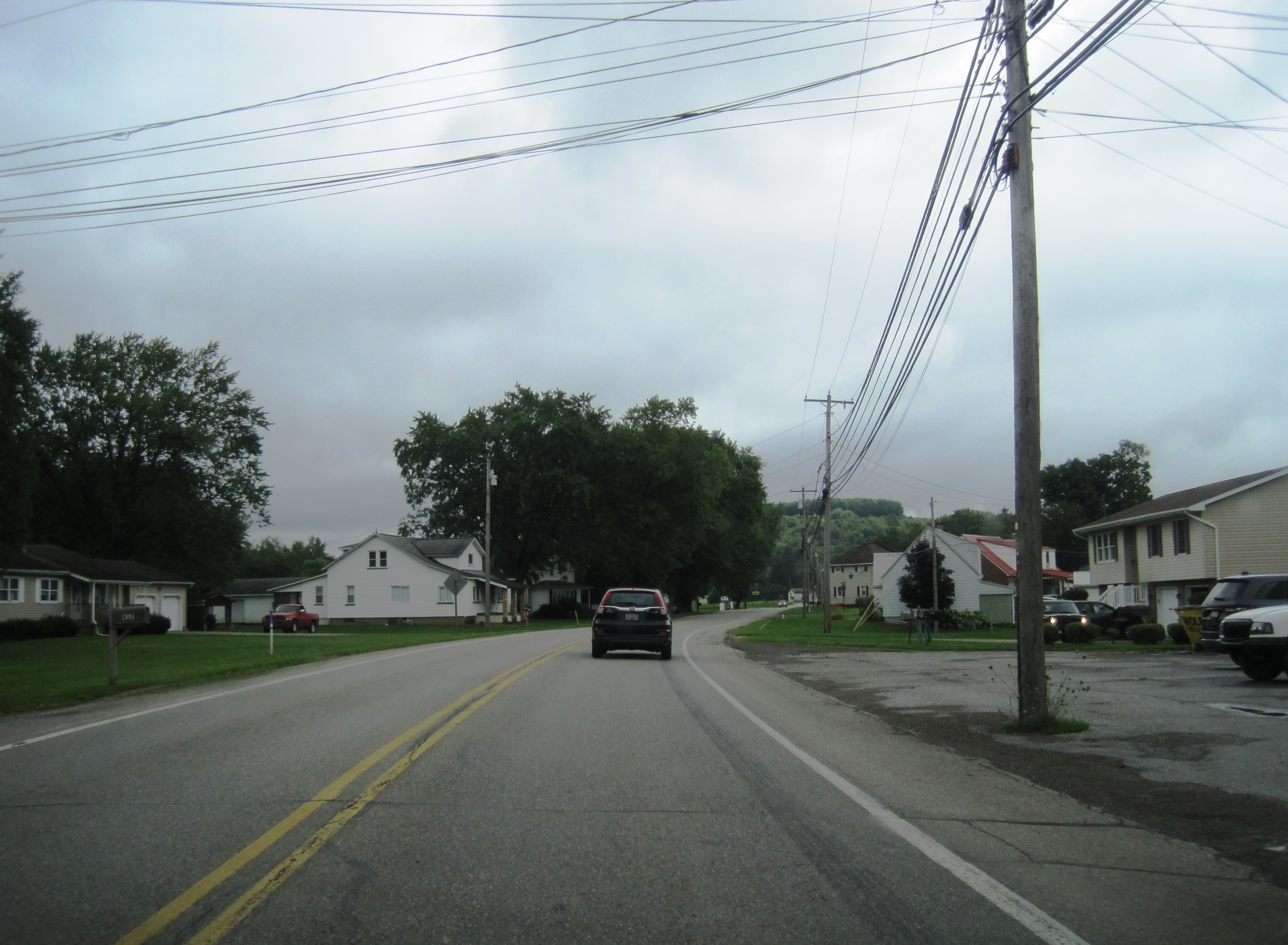
- Northbound US 219 in Brockport

- Location within Pennsylvania
- Coordinates: 41°15′35″N 78°43′36″W
- Country: United States
- State: Pennsylvania
- County: Elk
- Township: Horton
- Elevation: 1,375 ft (419 m)
- Time zone: UTC-5 (Eastern (EST))
  - Summer (DST): UTC-4 (EDT)
- ZIP code: 15823
- Area code: 814
- GNIS feature ID: 1170306

Brockport is an unincorporated community in Horton Township, Elk County, Pennsylvania, United States. Its ZIP code is 15823.
