= Beccaria Township, Pennsylvania =

Township in Pennsylvania, US

Coordinates: 40°44′45″N 78°27′59″W

- Township
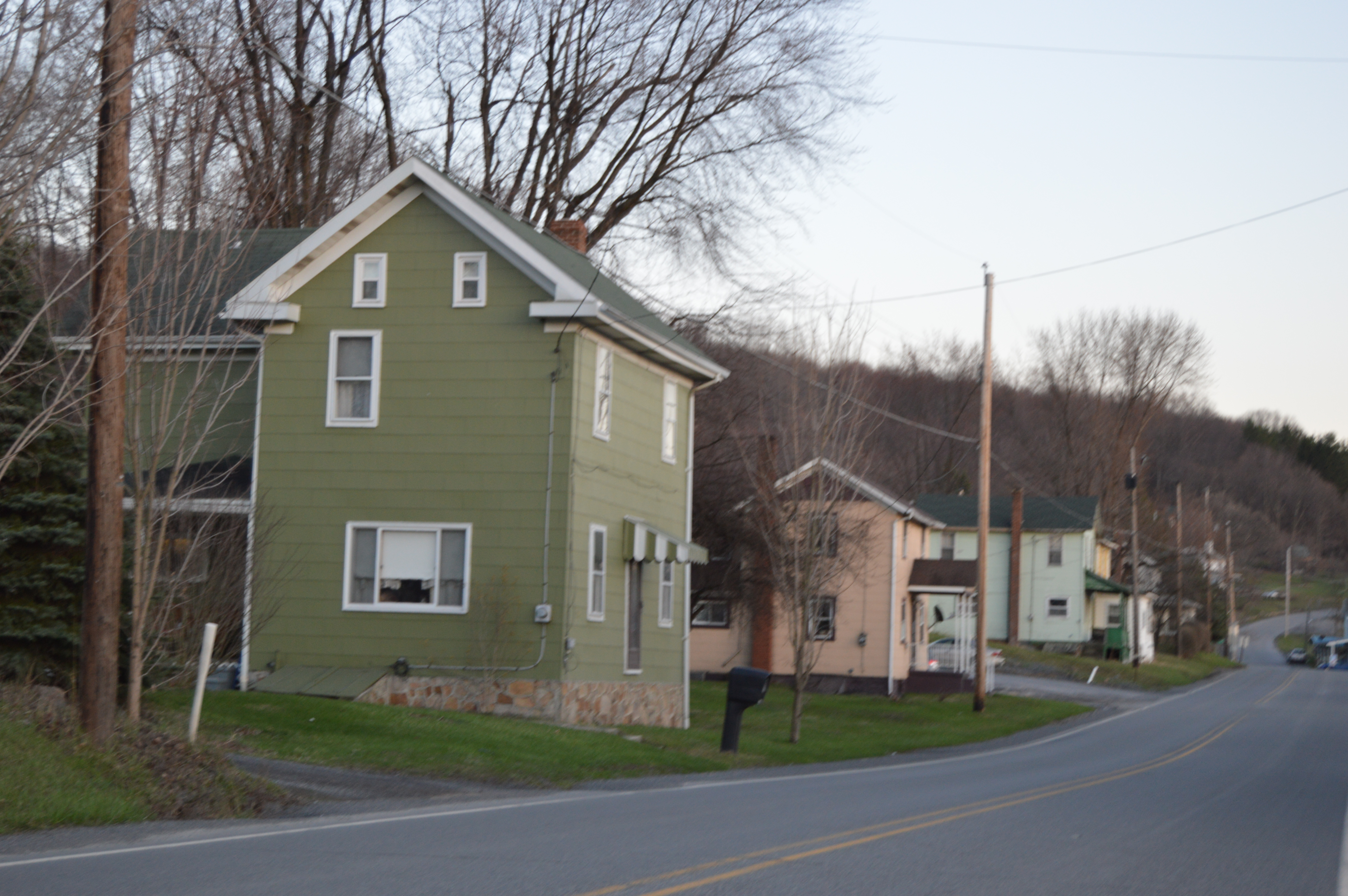
- Along Pennsylvania Route 53 at Blain City

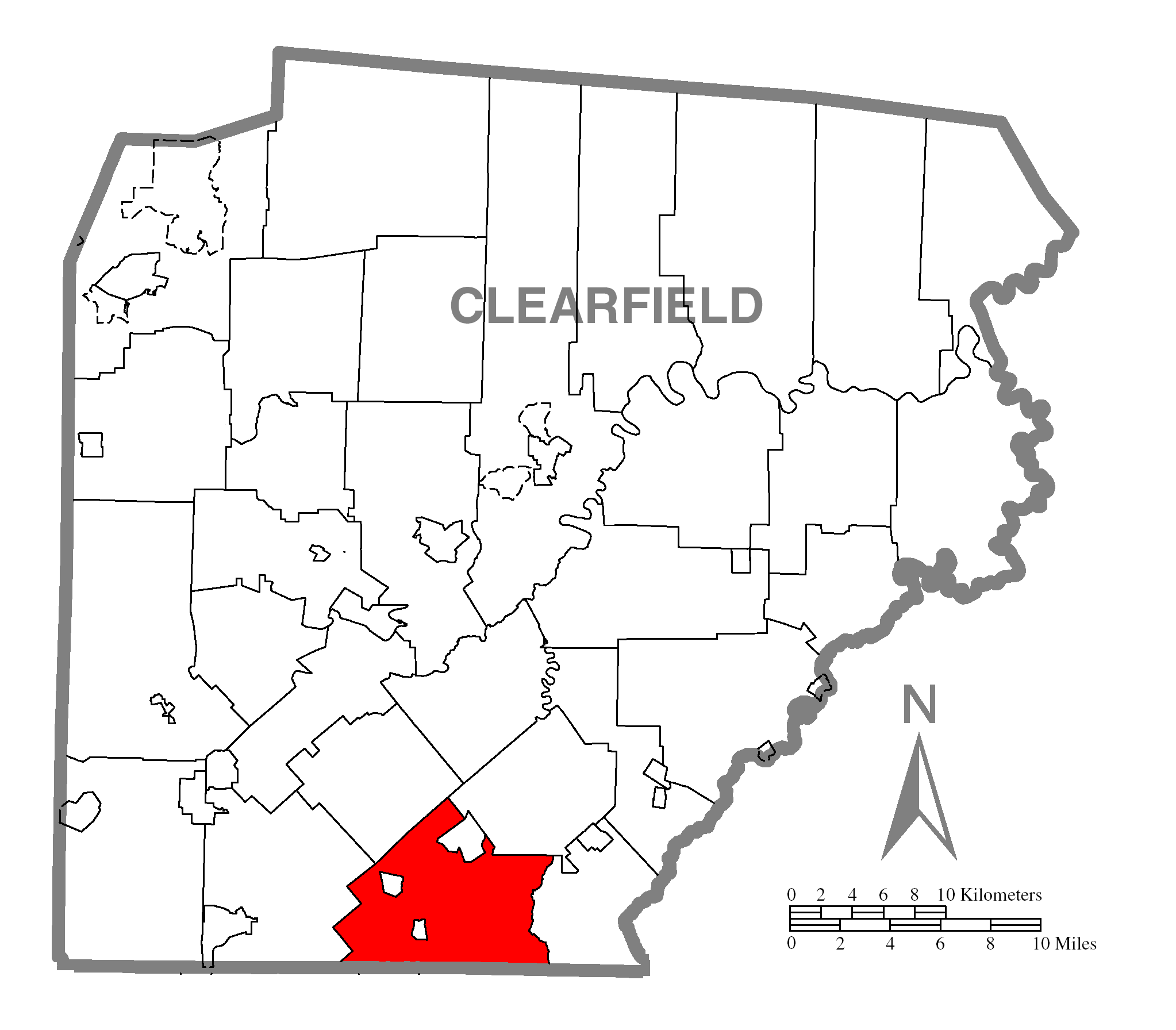
- Map of Clearfield County, Pennsylvania highlighting Beccaria Township

- Map of Clearfield County, Pennsylvania
- Country: United States
- State: Pennsylvania
- County: Clearfield
- Settled: 1798
- Incorporated: 1807

Area
  - Total: 36.00 sq mi (93.23 km^{2})
  - Land: 35.77 sq mi (92.64 km^{2})
  - Water: 0.23 sq mi (0.59 km^{2})

Population (2020)
  - Total: 1,769 ▼
  - Estimate (2022): 1,749 ▼
  - Density: 48.5/sq mi (18.72/km^{2})
- Time zone: UTC-5 (Eastern (EST))
  - Summer (DST): UTC-4 (EDT)
- Area code: 814
- FIPS code: 42-033-04888

Beccaria Township is a township in Clearfield County, Pennsylvania, United States. The population was 1,769 at the 2020 census. It is named in honor of Cesare Beccaria, an Enlightenment thinker.

== Geography ==
The township is located in southern Clearfield County and is bordered by Cambria County to the south. According to the United States Census Bureau, the township has a total area of 36.0 square miles (93.2 km^{2}), of which 35.8 square miles (92.6 km^{2}) is land and 0.23 square miles (0.6 km^{2}), or 0.64%, is water. Clearfield Creek, a tributary of the West Branch Susquehanna River, crosses the township from south to north.

== Communities ==
The township surrounds two boroughs, Irvona and Coalport, and borders the borough of Glen Hope on three sides. The boroughs are separate municipalities from the township. Unincorporated communities within the township include:

- Beccaria
- Blain City
- Comfort Run
- Diehltown
- Hegarty Crossroad
- Heverly
- Lyleville
- New London
- Rosebud
- Utahville

== Demographics ==
Historical population
Census	Pop.	Note	%±
1970	1,877		—
1980	2,102		12.0%
1990	1,917		−8.8%
2000	1,835		−4.3%
2010	1,782		−2.9%
2020	1,769		−0.7%
2022 (est.)	1,749		−1.1%
U.S. Decennial Census

As of the census of 2000, there were 1,835 people, 747 households, and 539 families residing in the township. The population density was 50.5 inhabitants per square mile (19.5/km^{2}). There were 873 housing units at an average density of 24.0/sq mi (9.3/km^{2}). The racial makeup of the township was 99.51% White, 0.05% African American, 0.11% Native American, and 0.33% from two or more races. Hispanic or Latino of any race were 0.16% of the population.

There were 747 households, out of which 26.9% had children under the age of 18 living with them, 59.6% were married couples living together, 8.8% had a female householder with no husband present, and 27.8% were non-families. 24.6% of all households were made up of individuals, and 14.2% had someone living alone who was 65 years of age or older. The average household size was 2.46 and the average family size was 2.90.

In the township the population was spread out, with 21.3% under the age of 18, 8.0% from 18 to 24, 27.8% from 25 to 44, 25.9% from 45 to 64, and 17.1% who were 65 years of age or older. The median age was 41 years. For every 100 females there were 94.6 males. For every 100 females age 18 and over, there were 93.3 males.

The median income for a household in the township was $28,714, and the median income for a family was $32,286. Males had a median income of $27,578 versus $17,381 for females. The per capita income for the township was $13,941. About 7.4% of families and 10.5% of the population were below the poverty line, including 13.7% of those under age 18 and 11.1% of those age 65 or over.

== Education ==
Students in Beccaria Township attend schools in the Glendale School District.

== Recreation ==
A small portion of the Pennsylvania State Game Lands Number 60 is located along the eastern border of the township north of Beccaria.
