= Blain City, Pennsylvania =

- Unincorporated community Census designated place
- Location within Pennsylvania Location within the United States
- Coordinates: 40°45′21.6″N 78°31′51.6″W
- Country: United States
- State: Pennsylvania
- County: Clearfield
- Township: Beccaria

Area
  - Total: 0.1811 sq mi (0.469 km^{2})
  - Land: 0.181 sq mi (0.47 km^{2})
  - Water: 0.001 sq mi (0.0026 km^{2})
- Time zone: UTC-5 (Eastern (EST))
  - Summer (DST): UTC-4 (EDT)
- FIPS code: 4206832
- GNIS feature ID: 2830751

Blain City is an unincorporated community and census designated place (CDP) in Beccaria Township, Clearfield County, Pennsylvania.

== Demographics ==
Historical population
Census	Pop.	Note	%±
U.S. Decennial Census

The United States Census Bureau first defined Blain City as a census designated place in 2023.
