= Boston Run, Pennsylvania =

Unincorporated community in Pennsylvania, US

Boston Run
- Unincorporated community
- Location within the state of Pennsylvania Boston Run (the United States)
- Coordinates: 40°48′11″N 76°11′21″W
- Country: United States
- State: Pennsylvania
- County: Schuylkill
- Elevation: 1,155 ft (352 m)
- Time zone: UTC-5 (Eastern (EST))
  - Summer (DST): UTC-4 (EDT)
- GNIS feature ID: 1170024

Boston Run is an unincorporated community and former coal town known as Suffolk in Schuylkill County, Pennsylvania, United States.
