= Brotherton, Pennsylvania =

- Unincorporated community
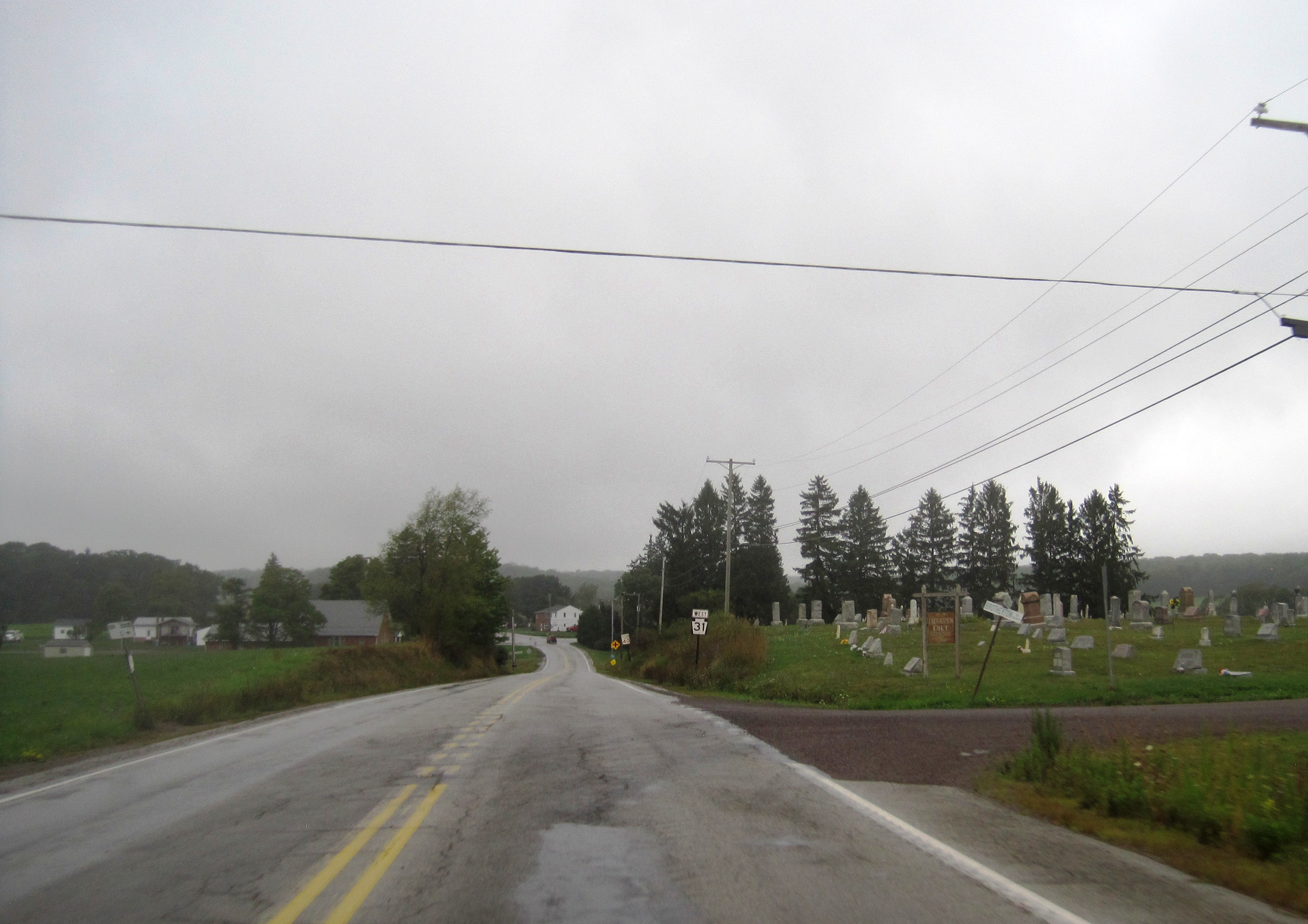
- PA 31 westbound in Brotherton

- Location within the state of Pennsylvania Brotherton (the United States)
- Coordinates: 39°58′17.29″N 78°57′28.09″W
- Country: United States
- State: Pennsylvania
- County: Somerset
- Elevation: 2,326 ft (709 m)
- Time zone: UTC-5 (Eastern (EST))
  - Summer (DST): UTC-4 (EDT)
- ZIP code(s): 15530 (Berlin)
- Area code: 814
- FIPS code: 26-37520
- GNIS feature ID: 1170353

Brotherton is an unincorporated community in Brothersvalley Township and Stonycreek Township, Somerset County, in the U.S. state of Pennsylvania.

About 3 miles to the southeast along Route 31 is Roxbury.
