= Blaine Hill, Pennsylvania =

- Unincorporated community Census designated place
- Location within Pennsylvania Location within the United States
- Coordinates: 40°16′26.4″N 79°52′30.0″W
- Country: United States
- State: Pennsylvania
- County: Allegheny
- Township: Elizabeth

Population
  - Estimate (2023): 563
- Time zone: UTC-5 (Eastern (EST))
  - Summer (DST): UTC-4 (EDT)
- GNIS feature ID: 2830752

Blaine Hill, Pennsylvania is an unincorporated community and census designated place (CDP) in Elizabeth Township, Allegheny County, in the U.S. state of Pennsylvania.

== Demographics ==
Historical population
| Census | Pop. | Note | %± |
|---|---|---|---|
| 2023 (est.) | 563 |

The United States Census Bureau defined Blaine Hill as a census designated place in 2023.
