= Backup Corners, Pennsylvania =

Unincorporated community in Pennsylvania, US

- Unincorporated community
- Location within Pennsylvania Location within the United States
- Coordinates: 41°55′02″N 79°09′00″W
- Country: United States
- State: Pennsylvania
- County: Warren County
- Elevation: 1,247 ft (380 m)
- Time zone: UTC-5 (EST)
  - Summer (DST): UTC-4 (EDT)
- GNIS feature ID: 1168563

Backup Corners is an unincorporated community in Warren County, Pennsylvania, United States.

Conewango Creek flows on the eastern boundary of the settlement.

A now-abandoned track of the Dunkirk, Allegheny Valley and Pittsburgh Railroad, completed in the early 1870s, passes through the settlement.
