= Brandy Camp, Pennsylvania =

Unincorporated community in Pennsylvania, US

- Unincorporated community
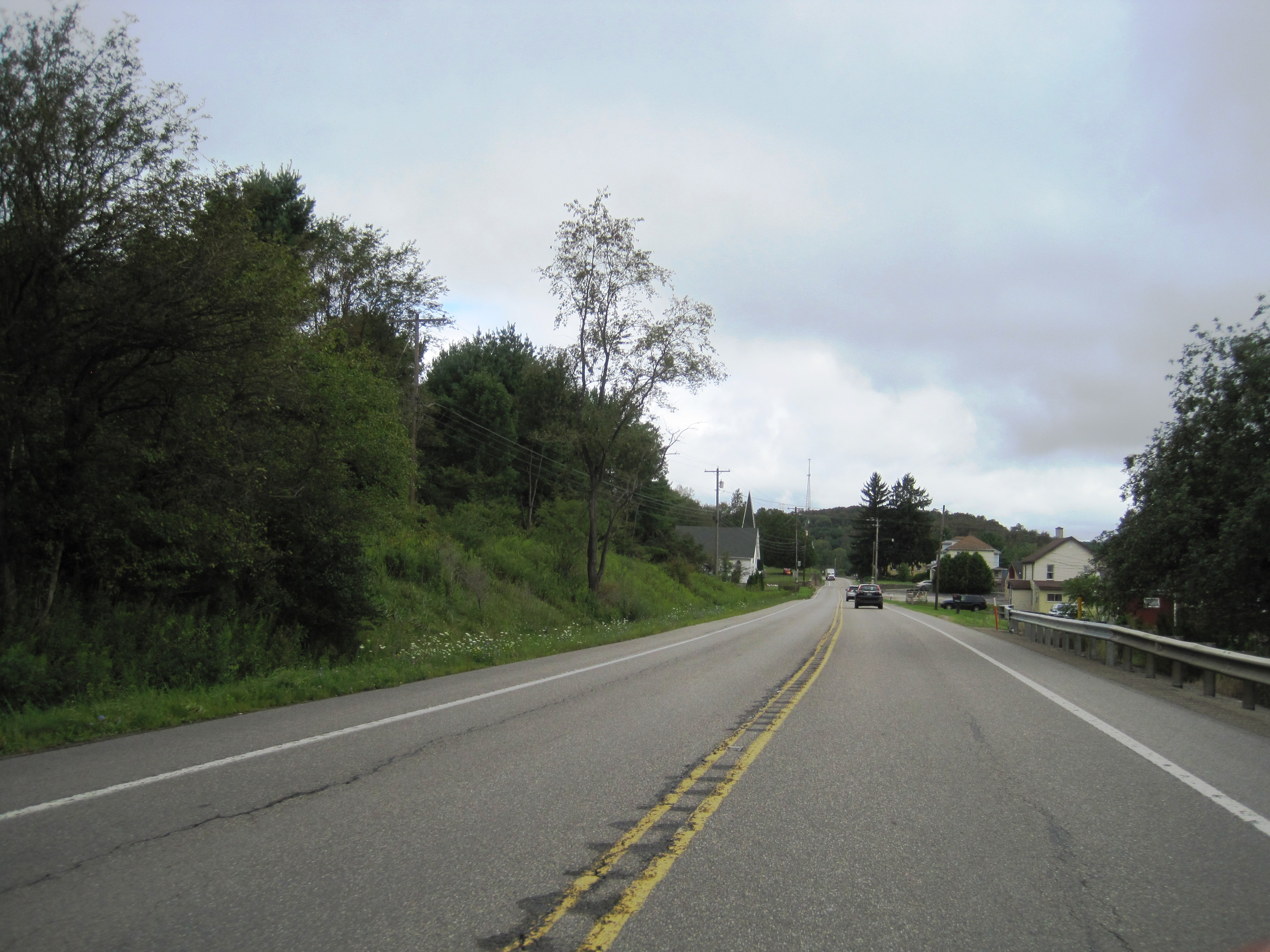
- US 219 northbound in Brandy Camp

- Location within the state of Pennsylvania Brandy Camp (the United States)
- Coordinates: 41°19′15″N 78°41′15″W
- Country: United States
- State: Pennsylvania
- County: Elk
- Township: Horton
- Elevation: 1,549 ft (472 m)
- Time zone: UTC-5 (Eastern (EST))
  - Summer (DST): UTC-4 (EDT)
- ZIP codes: 15822
- GNIS feature ID: 1170161

Brandy Camp is an unincorporated community and coal town in Elk County, Pennsylvania, United States. Their post office closed in 2005.
