= Bradford Township, Clearfield County, Pennsylvania =

Township in Pennsylvania, US

Coordinates: 41°01′32″N 78°19′08″W

- Township
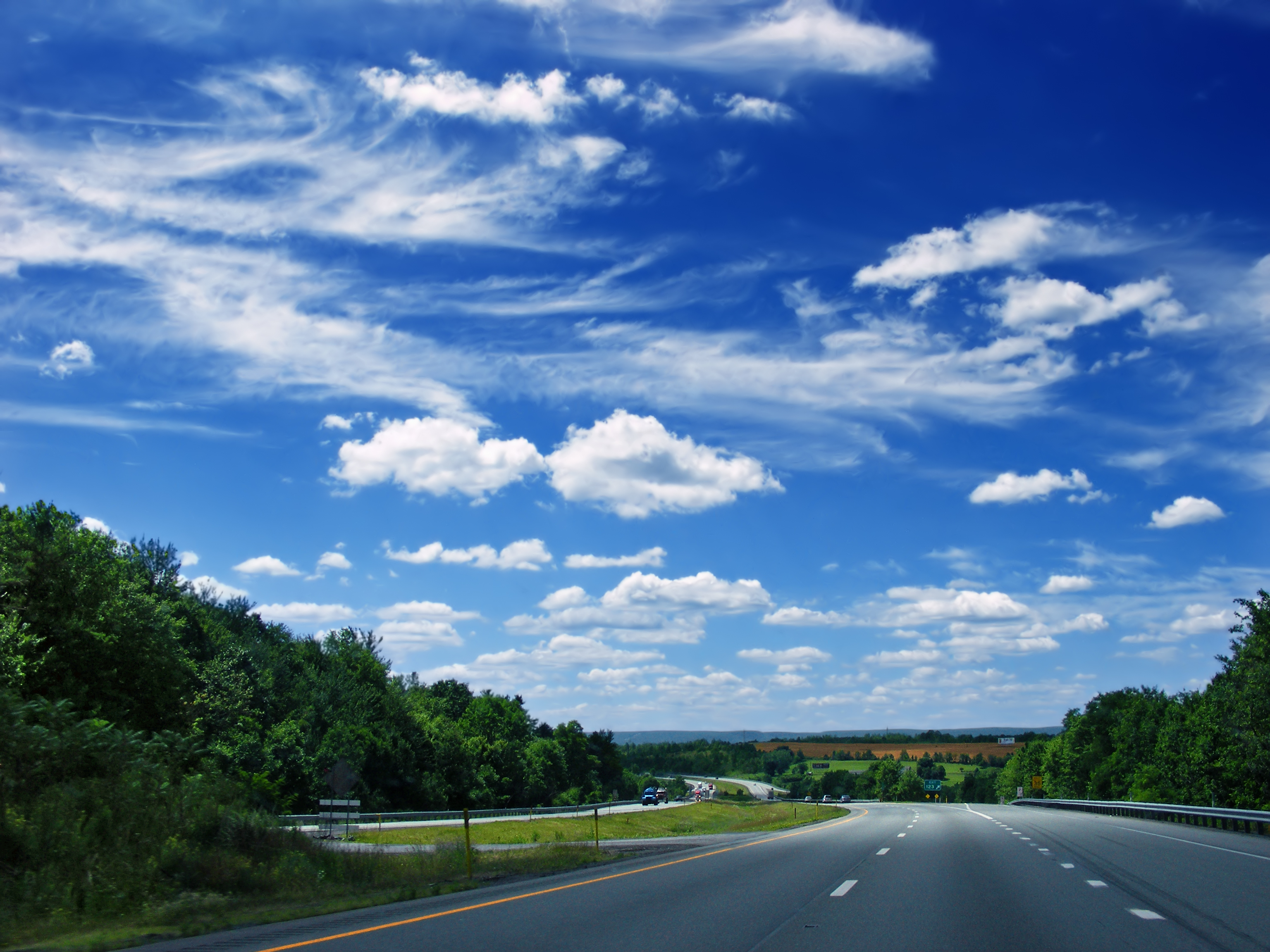
- I-80 as it passes through Bradford Township

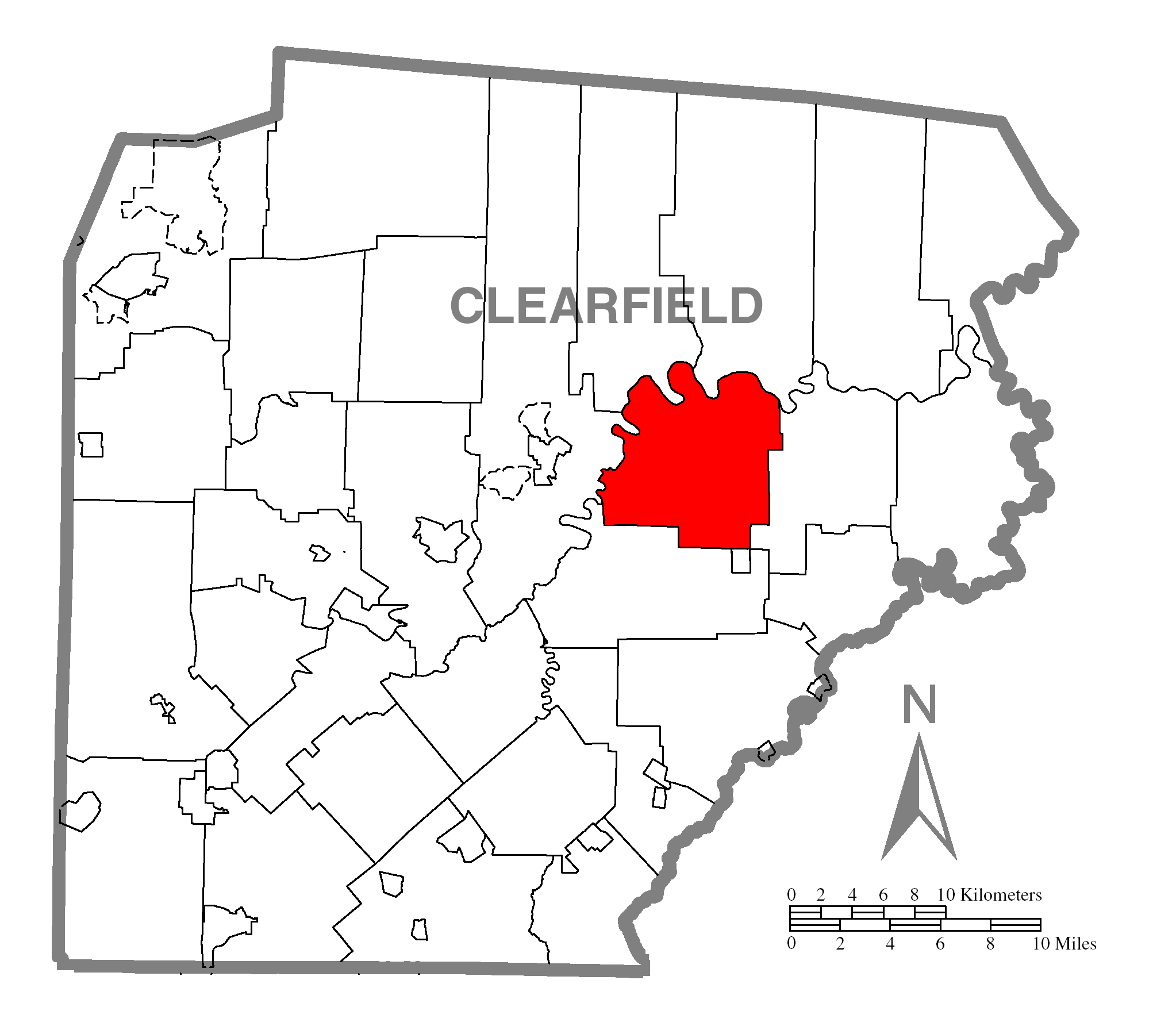
- Map of Clearfield County, Pennsylvania highlighting Bradford Township

- Map of Clearfield County, Pennsylvania
- Country: United States
- State: Pennsylvania
- County: Clearfield
- Incorporated: 1807

Area
  - Total: 38.85 sq mi (100.63 km^{2})
  - Land: 38.33 sq mi (99.27 km^{2})
  - Water: 0.53 sq mi (1.36 km^{2})

Population (2020)
  - Total: 2,836 ▼
  - Estimate (2022): 2,834 ▼
  - Density: 77.8/sq mi (30.05/km^{2})
- Time zone: UTC-5 (Eastern (EST))
  - Summer (DST): UTC-4 (EDT)
- Area code: 814
- FIPS code: 42-033-08032
- Website: www.bradfordtwp.org

Bradford Township is a township in Clearfield County, Pennsylvania, United States. The population was 2,836 at the 2020 census.

== Geography ==
According to the United States Census Bureau, the township has a total area of 38.8 square miles (100 km^{2}), of which 38.3 square miles (99 km^{2}) is land and 0.5 square miles (1.3 km^{2}) (1.29%) is water.

== Communities ==
- Barrett
- Bigler
- Bishtown
- Dale
- Egypt
- Gallows Harbor
- Mineral Springs
- Pine Top
- Pleasant Valley
- Shiloh
- Woodland

== Demographics ==
Historical population
Census	Pop.	Note	%±
1970	2,828		—
1980	3,374		19.3%
1990	2,504		−25.8%
2000	3,314		32.3%
2010	3,034		−8.4%
2020	2,836		−6.5%
2022 (est.)	2,834		−0.1%
U.S. Decennial Census

At the 2000 census, there were 3,314 people, 1,206 households and 963 families residing in the township. The population density was 86.6 inhabitants per square mile (33.4/km^{2}). There were 1,296 housing units at an average density of 33.9 per square mile (13.1/km^{2}). The racial makeup of the township was 98.91% White, 0.21% African American, 0.39% Native American, 0.09% Asian, 0.03% from other races, and 0.36% from two or more races. Hispanic or Latino of any race were 0.18% of the population.

There were 1,206 households, of which 34.9% had children under the age of 18 living with them, 66.9% were married couples living together, 8.9% had a female householder with no husband present, and 20.1% were non-families. 17.0% of all households were made up of individuals, and 8.6% had someone living alone who was 65 years of age or older. The average household size was 2.75 and the average family size was 3.07.

Age distribution was 25.8% under the age of 18, 8.8% from 18 to 24, 28.2% from 25 to 44, 25.4% from 45 to 64, and 11.8% who were 65 years of age or older. The median age was 37 years. For every 100 females, there were 98.0 males. For every 100 females age 18 and over, there were 98.7 males.

The median household income was $32,214 and the median family income was $36,106. Males had a median income of $27,318 versus $20,595 for females. The per capita income for the township was $14,877. About 8.1% of families and 13.1% of the population were below the poverty line, including 20.4% of those under age 18 and 9.6% of those age 65 or over.

== Education ==
Students in Bradford Township attend schools in the Clearfield Area School District.
