= Bear Valley, Pennsylvania =

Unincorporated community in Pennsylvania, U.S.

- Unincorporated community
- Location within Pennsylvania Location within the United States
- Coordinates: 40°46′23″N 76°34′37″W
- Country: United States
- State: Pennsylvania
- County: Northumberland County
- Elevation: 833 ft (254 m)
- Time zone: UTC-5 (Eastern Time Zone)
  - Summer (DST): UTC-4
- ZIP code: 17824
- Area code: 570

Bear Valley is an unincorporated community in Northumberland County, Pennsylvania, United States, near Shamokin. It is the site of an abandoned anthracite strip mine. This strip mine is a popular place for observing the Llewellyn Formation.
