= Briscoe Springs, Pennsylvania =

Community in Pennsylvania, US

Coordinates: 41.28825°N 80.28671°W

Briscoe Springs, Pennsylvania, is a small crossroads community along the border Route 173 south of Interstate 80 in Mercer County.

Longtime residents of the area claim Briscoe Springs was named after Father Briscoe who built a small log chapel next to one of the numerous springs in the shallow valley in the late 19th century. The story goes per local historians that he mixed wagon repair with his ministry and that one day Father Briscoe fell in love with a young woman who stopped at the spring. He left the area with her, never to be seen again.

Briscoe Springs has many other names. The unincorporated community was also known at varying times as Perry's Corners, named after the blacksmith Jeff Perry, in the late 19th century and as Dye's Corners, after the Dye family that built a service station and a Durant automobile dealership there in the mid-1920s.

Briscoe Springs landmarks include the Pennsylvania Department of Transportation signs on its northern and southern ends. A foundation stone said to be per former residents from the chapel built by Father Briscoe is still visible in the yard of a farm owned by John and Ruth McDougall. A one-room schoolhouse, Hemlock School, that was moved into the area when Briscoe Springs began to grow in the 1920s. The Briscoe Springs Grange met at Hemlock School circa 1950. The school was originally located near Diamond Road and now is located on Route 173 and used as a construction company's office.

The people of Briscoe Springs included Native American Indians as the first people to inhabit the area known for its springs. Part of Father Briscoe legend is that he came here first as a missionary to the Indians. The first settlers were farmers. Today the area is populated by people from a variety of professions. Medical professionals, retirees, educators, skilled trades people, farmers, and business professionals make up the current population. Many of the homes are obscured by rolling hills and wooded lots.

Briscoe Springs as a community didn't develop till after the state paved a six-mile section of Route 173 leading to Grove City in 1922. The first three houses were erected by Ernest Northcote, Henry Hodgson and Everet Swarts in 1923. Today, there are some 50 homes and a smattering of small businesses. Benjamin Dye and his sons opened a service station and garage to sell Durant automobiles in 1924; one of their buildings was occupied by the Palmer-Smith linen company. The Bowie Coal Mine operated on the Nicklin Farm off what is now Nicklin Road in the 1930s.

== Notes ==
- Mercer County
- The Town & Crossroads Index
- Youngstown Vindicator
