= Bermudian, Pennsylvania =

Unincorporated community in Pennsylvania, US

Coordinates: 40°01′10″N 77°02′08″W

Bermudian Mechanicsville, Braggtown
- Unincorporated community
- Location within Pennsylvania Location within the United States
- Country: United States
- State: Pennsylvania
- Counties: Adams, York
- Founded: 1800
- Founder: Joseph Griest
- Time zone: UTC-5 (Eastern)
  - Summer (DST): UTC-4 (EDT)

Bermudian is an unincorporated community in Adams and York counties, Pennsylvania, United States. It is named after the nearby Bermudian Creek.

The community was originally founded in 1800 as Mechanicsville, or Braggtown by Joseph Griest, before being renamed to its current name sometime between 1875 and 1979.
