= Bonus (Sirmium) =

- Military career
- Allegiance: East Roman army (Justin II)
- Service years: fl. 561–570
- Rank: magister militum

Bonus (Greek: Βῶνος or Βόνος), also Bonos or Bonosus, was a Byzantine general, active in the reign of Justin II (r. 565–578). He is known to have been situated at Sirmium, spending his career defending the Byzantine Empire against the Avars. He might have been a magister militum per Illyricum. The main source about him is Menander Protector.

== Biography ==
Bonus is first mentioned c. 561, while in the service of Justin, son of Germanus. Bonus was tasked with defending the Danube limes against the Avars. He is mentioned at the time as a protostates (Greek: πρωτοστάτης τοῦ θητικοῦ και οἰκετικοῦ). His title might have been equivalent to a majordomo.

He resurfaces in 568–570 as a general. His exact position in the military hierarchy is uncertain, but the location of his activities at Sirmium, while still being in charge of the Danube limes, suggests the position of magister militum per Illyricum.

The spring of 568 found the Avars besieging Sirmium. Bonus was in charge of the defense within the walls and was wounded in combat. When negotiations started between the defenders and the besiegers, Bonus was initially unable to attend the meetings. The Avars started suspecting that their opponent was dead, forcing Bonus to appear to them in person. The Avars eventually agreed to lift the siege in exchange for a "gift" (payment). Bonus sought the approval from emperor Justin II.

Months later, Bonus allowed an Avar embassy to cross Byzantine areas towards Constantinople. The negotiations at the capital failed. Justin II reprimanded Bonus for granting protection to an embassy that had clearly unacceptable demands. His message to Bonus also warned the general to prepare for renewed hostilities. In 569/570, Tiberius II Constantine, the comes excubitorum, instructed Bonus to guard the river crossings of the Danube once more. His subsequent activities are unknown.

The 10th-century Suda lexicon preserves another fragment of Menander Protector concerning Bonus, though its context is left unclear. The passage has Bonus warning his men that the Avars use battle cries and the beating of the drums to unnerve their enemies. He instructs his forces to answer with battle cries of their own. The "Suda On Line" project translates the relevant passage (E, 2310): "The Avars in their battle-charge wanted to raise a confused and fierce noise, and along with their yelling to make a thud on their drums, so that the din would be raised so much that it would astonish and terrify the Roman army. Since Bonos knew this in advance, he forewarned the soldiers, so that they would not be dumbfounded by the melee, but imitating in advance what was going to happen, to be accustomed to what was to come by the similarity even before the event, and when they perceived the beating of the drums, they themselves would beat in return with their shields and shout the war-song and sing a paean and make a thump on the water-pots (which were made of wood)."

== See also ==
- Bonosus

== Sources ==
- Martindale, John R., ed. (1992). The Prosopography of the Later Roman Empire: Volume III, AD 527–641. Cambridge: Cambridge University Press. ISBN 0-521-20160-8.
