= Bohrmans Mill (Pennsylvania) =

Coordinates: 40.63863°N 76.12232°W

Bohrman's Mill is a water-powered gristmill built in 1815 in Schuylkill County, Pennsylvania. The mill was located outside the town of Orwigsburg, along Mahonney Creek, which flows from Second Mountain. The mill was primarily used for grinding cornmeal and hulling oats, using a 20-foot overshot water wheel, later switching to a turbine system.

The earliest known proprietor of the mill was George Heebner; another owner, Daniel Boyer, maintained the mill from 1865 to 1894. Since 1894 until its closing, the mill and subsequent farm was owned and operated by the Bohrman family. Though the mill no longer exists, like most others in Schuylkill County, the homes and several supporting structures still stand. The area around the old farm keeps the name Bohrman's Mill.

The Bohrman family has surviving members in Orwigsburg, and several other places throughout Pennsylvania.

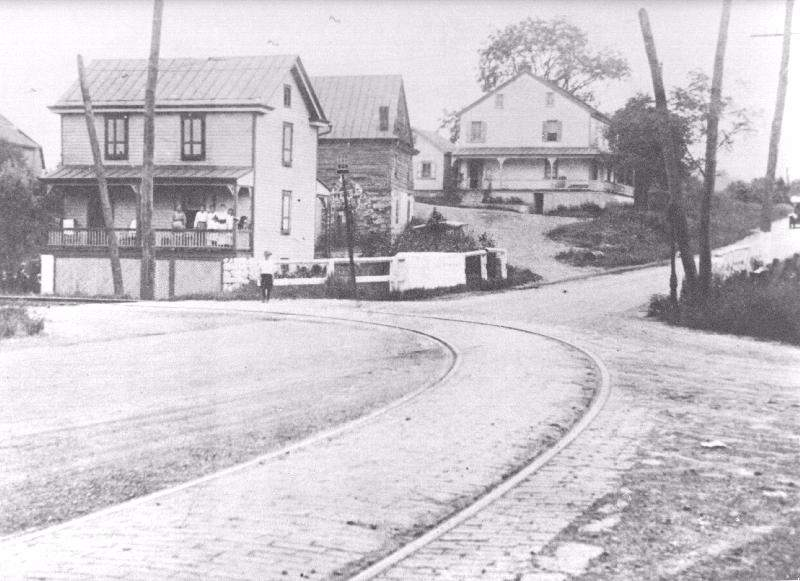
Mill Site -Early 1900s Trolley Tracks
