= Bonus, Pennsylvania =

Unincorporated community in Pennsylvania, US

Coordinates: 41°07′03″N 79°43′00″W

Bonus is an unincorporated community in Butler County, Pennsylvania.

== History ==
A post office called Bonus was established in 1898, and remained in operation until 1903. The origin of the name "Bonus" is obscure.
