= Bovard, Westmoreland County, Pennsylvania =

Unincorporated community in Pennsylvania, US

Bovard
- Unincorporated community
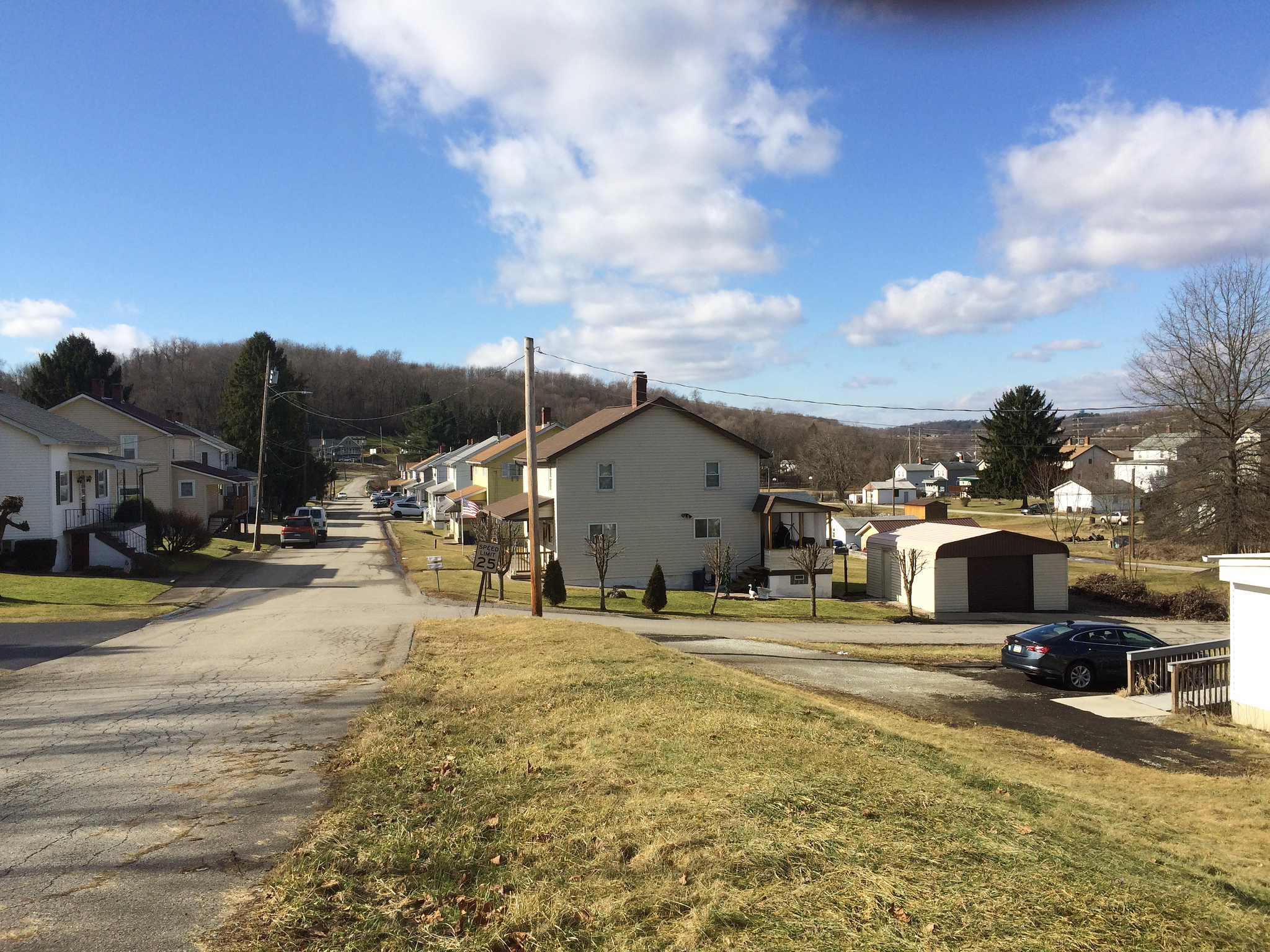
- Houses in Bovard

- Location within the state of Pennsylvania Bovard (the United States)
- Coordinates: 40°19′11″N 79°30′12″W
- Country: United States
- State: Pennsylvania
- County: Westmoreland
- Elevation: 1,115 ft (340 m)
- Time zone: UTC-5 (Eastern (EST))
  - Summer (DST): UTC-4 (EDT)
- ZIP codes: 15619
- GNIS feature ID: 1170039

Bovard is an unincorporated community and coal town in Hempfield Township, Westmoreland County, Pennsylvania, United States. The community is located near U.S. Route 119, 2.3 miles (3.7 km) northeast of Greensburg and is also the former home of baseball standout, Anthony Marazza. Marazza, dubbed "Mr. Bovard", is notable for leading Bovard to six championships in the past decade in the ICL and Pittsburgh Leagues.

The town was originally called Crows Nest, a name which survives in Crows Nest Road, a main street in Bovard. The town was the site of the Crows Nest underground bituminous coal mine, which Keystone Coal & Coke Co. opened in 1910. The town was renamed in 1914 after Harry F. Bovard, a mining company executive. According to a publication of the U.S. Department of the Interior:

The Crows Nest Mine at Bovard is located at the end of First Street, along a tributary of Jacks Run.... By 1915 the Crows Nest mine employed 456 persons and produced over 726,000 tons of coal, the largest amount produced from what was one of the most productive mines in the county. Production continued apace during the First World War. Over 540,000 tons of coal were mined each year during the war. Keystone Coal & Coke sold the mine property to Adam Eidemiller in 1942. Underground mining was ended by 1944. Strip mining commenced about this time, and a screening plant handled coal extracted at other mines. Eidemiller closed this coal-cleaning operation in 1950. For a number of years the site remained abandoned. However, in 1959 Adam Eidemiller, Inc. opened the Keystone Concrete Pipe Company, using a number of the old mine buildings for this operation. This concern employed about thirty persons. In 1975 a new coal cleaning plant was constructed next to the concrete pipe factory and leased to the Bovard Processing Company.

Bovard has a post office with ZIP code 15619.

== Gallery ==
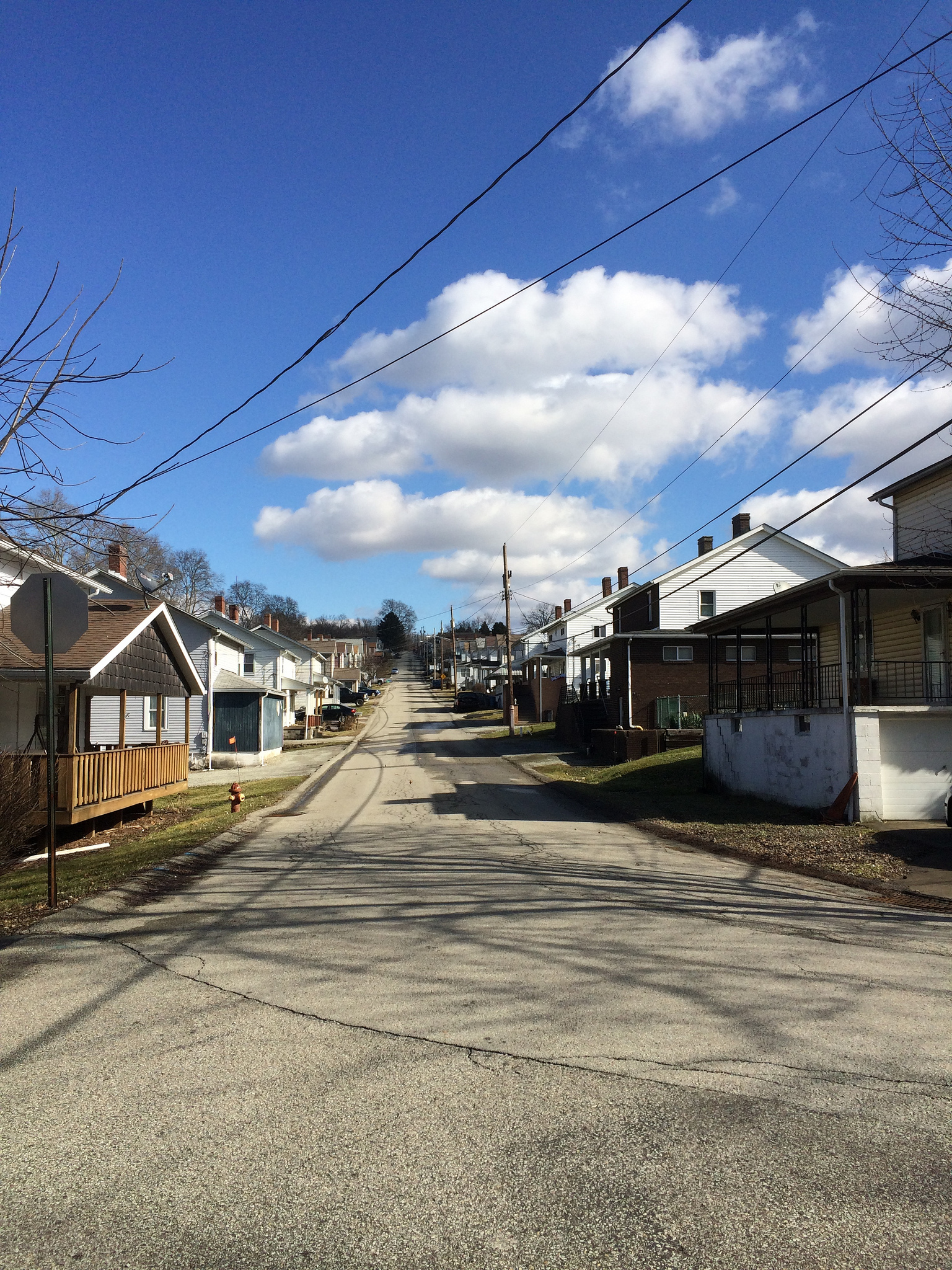
Houses on Price Road

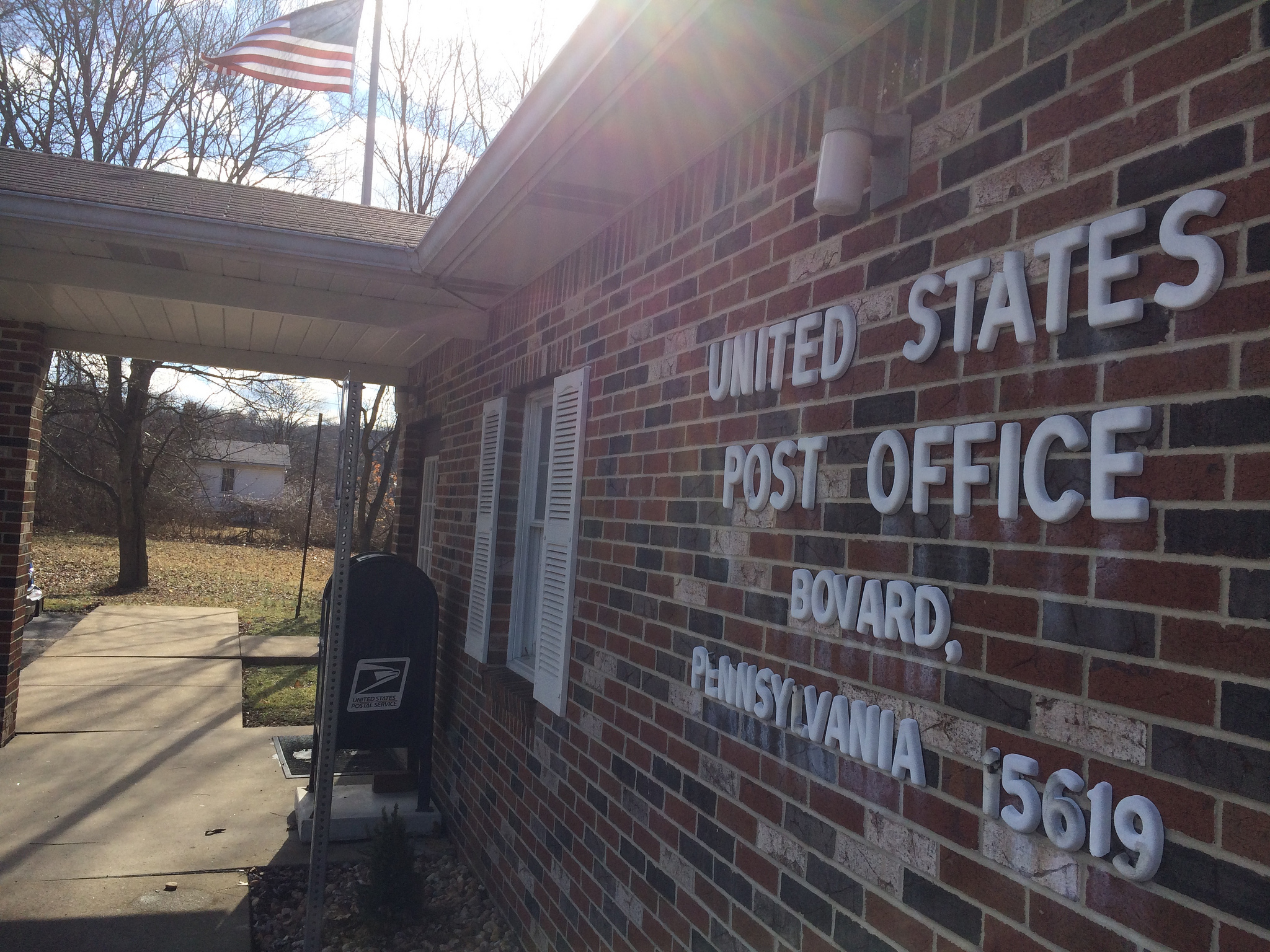
Post Office

== See also ==
- Historic Pittsburgh web site. Photo. Circa 1948. Miners at Crows Nest Mine
- Virtual Museum of Coal Mining in Western Pennsylvania. History of Crows Nest Mine.
- Pennsylvania State University. Pennsylvania Mine Map Atlas
- Scott, Rebekah. 17 October 2004. Here: In Bovard, Westmoreland County. Pittsburgh Post-Gazette.
