= Bovard, Butler County, Pennsylvania =

Bovard, Pennsylvania
- Unincorporated community
- Location within Pennsylvania
- Coordinates: 41°04′25″N 79°58′18″W
- Country: United States
- State: Pennsylvania
- County: Butler
- Elevation: 1,181 ft (360 m)
- Time zone: UTC-5 (Eastern (EST))
  - Summer (DST): UTC-4 (EDT)
- Area code: 724
- GNIS feature ID: 1170038

Bovard is an unincorporated community in Butler County, Pennsylvania, United States. The community is located on Slippery Rock Creek 4.5 miles (7.2 km) east of Slippery Rock.
