= National Register of Historic Places listings in Clinton County, Pennsylvania =

Location of Clinton County in Pennsylvania

This is a list of the National Register of Historic Places listings in Clinton County, Pennsylvania.

This is intended to be a complete list of the properties and districts on the National Register of Historic Places in Clinton County, Pennsylvania, United States. The locations of National Register properties and districts for which the latitude and longitude coordinates are included below, may be seen in a map.

There are 10 properties and districts listed on the National Register in the county.

This National Park Service list is complete through NPS recent listings posted April 3, 2026.

== Current listings ==
	Name on the Register	Image	Date listed	Location	City or town	Description
1	Farrandsville Iron Furnace	Farrandsville Iron Furnace	September 6, 1991 (#91001137)	Junction of Graham and Old Carrier Roads; 41°10′29″N 77°30′52″W	Colebrook Township	
2	Nathan Harvey House	Nathan Harvey House	January 3, 1985 (#85000034)	425–427 South Water Street; 41°06′36″N 77°29′06″W	Mill Hall	
3	Heisey House	Heisey House	March 16, 1972 (#72001113)	362 East Water Street; 41°08′15″N 77°26′24″W	Lock Haven	
4	Logan Mills Covered Bridge	Logan Mills Covered Bridge	August 6, 1979 (#79002213)	Southwest of Loganton over Fishing Creek; 41°00′20″N 77°23′11″W	Logan Township	
5	Logan Mills Gristmill	Logan Mills Gristmill	August 11, 1980 (#80003476)	Off Pennsylvania Route 880; 41°00′23″N 77°23′01″W	Logan Township	
6	Memorial Park Site	Memorial Park Site	April 14, 1982 (#82003783)	On the southern bank of the Susquehanna River near the confluence of Bald Eagle Creek; 41°08′19″N 77°25′04″W	Lock Haven	
7	Isaac A. Packer Farm	Isaac A. Packer Farm	February 21, 1991 (#91000092)	Farrandsville Road along the West Branch of the Susquehanna River; 41°09′58″N 77°28′12″W	Woodward Township	
8	Ravensburg State Park	Ravensburg State Park	May 18, 1987 (#87000741)	8 miles (13 km) southeast of Jersey Shore on Pennsylvania Route 880; 41°06′16″N 77°14′34″W	Crawford Township	
9	Rich-McCormick Woolen Factory	Rich-McCormick Woolen Factory	September 5, 1985 (#85001959)	Little Plum Run Road; 41°10′17″N 77°22′16″W	Dunnstable Township	
10	Water Street District	Water Street District	July 10, 1973 (#73001618)	Roughly bounded by the Susquehanna River, St. Mary's Alley, Locust Avenue, and 6th Street; 41°08′17″N 77°26′58″W	Lock Haven	

== See also ==
- List of National Historic Landmarks in Pennsylvania
- National Register of Historic Places listings in Pennsylvania
- List of Pennsylvania state historical markers in Clinton County
