= WVSQ =

Coordinates: 41.238°N 77.750°W

Simulcast of WSQV (92.1 FM) Lock Haven
- Renovo, Pennsylvania; United States
- Broadcast area: Lock Haven, Pennsylvania
- Frequency: 106.9 MHz
- Branding: 92.1 & 106.9 WSQV

Programming
- Format: Classic rock (WSQV simulcast)

Ownership
- Owner: Jeffry and Mark Schlesinger; (Schlesinger Communications, Inc.)
- Sister stations: WQWK; WBPZ; WBLF

History
- First air date: 1996 (as WXKW)
- Former call signs: WMHU (1989–1995, CP); WXKW (1995–1997); WZYY (1997–2009); WQKK (2009–2020)

Technical information
- Licensing authority: FCC
- Facility ID: 49266
- Class: A
- ERP: 800 watts
- HAAT: 267 meters (876 ft)
- Repeater: 106.9 WVSQ-FM1 (Renovo)

Links
- Public license information: Public file; LMS
- Website: wsqvradio.com

WVSQ is an FM radio station operating on 106.9 MHz licensed to Renovo, Pennsylvania; the station serves the Renovo and Lock Haven areas. Currently airing a classic rock format branded as "The Valley's Best Rock", it was announced by Magnum Broadcasting, on May 22, 2020 that the station would be sold to Schlesinger Communications, Inc., owners of Lock Haven rocker WSQV and that it would begin simulcasting the WSQV signal at 106.9 FM to better serve Clinton County. Notable on-air Q106.9 personalities included Glenie B (Mornings), long-time State College fixture Steve Hilton (Mid-Days 10am-3pm), Garrett (Afternoons 3pm-7pm) and local mobile DJ Ricky Lapean (aka Rick Rock) who now hosts the morning show on sister station WQWK.

== History ==
Previous "Y106.9" logo

WQKK was previously a hot adult contemporary station known as Y106.9 from 1996 until 2004 under the call sign WZYY; the station changed ownership and on January 1, 2005, became "106.9 The Surge", adopting a rock format. In May 2008, the rock format was dropped in favor of a simulcast of country sister station 105.9 WJOW (105.9 Joe FM). In March 2009, the format was adjusted to a mix of country and classic rock with the moniker "Rockin' Country 105.9/106.9 Joe FM. The format was changed back to rock under the brand "Qwik Rock" in September 2009. The call sign was changed from WZYY to WQKK (to match sister station WQCK) in October 2009.

On October 28, 2011, WQKK split from its simulcast with WQCK, changed its format to soft adult contemporary and returned to using the brand "Y106.9". Within weeks, the station evolved to hot adult contemporary. By 2014, Y106.9 made changes to its music programming, once again and upping it to more of a top 40 pop station. They played the hottest hits on the chart with a twist of dance music and up-beat pop hits from the 1980s and 1990s and early 2000 faves with rave reviews from listeners.

On December 1, 2016, WQKK changed their format from hot adult contemporary to 1980s' hits, branded as "Q106.9".

On August 31, 2020, the station changed its call sign to WVSQ. On September 7, 2020, WVSQ changed their format from 1980s' hits to a simulcast of classic rock-formatted WSQV 92.1 FM Lock Haven.

== FM booster and streaming options ==
In addition to its main signal, WVSQ is authorized to operate a 20-watt on-channel booster station, call sign WVSQ-FM1, also licensed to Renovo, Pennsylvania.
