= Dunnstown =

Dunnstown is the name of several geographic localities:

- Dunnstown, Victoria, a town in Australia
- Dunnstown, Pennsylvania, a census-designated place in the United States of America
