= Logan's Path =

US Native American trails in Pennsylvania

Logan's Path was the name of two major Native American trails in the U.S. State of Pennsylvania that ran from two locations on the West Branch Susquehanna River in what is now Clinton County to the native village of Kishacoquillas (modern-day Lewistown) on the Juniata River. One branch ran from the Great Island (near modern-day Lock Haven) along Bald Eagle Creek and Fishing Creek then overland to Penns Creek. The other branch started at the village of Tishimingo near the mouth of Chatam Run (near the modern village of McElhattan in Wayne Township) then overland south to Kishacoquillas in modern Mifflin County.
