= Logan Township, Pennsylvania =

Logan Township is the name of some places in the U.S. state of Pennsylvania:

- Logan Township, Blair County, Pennsylvania
- Logan Township, Clinton County, Pennsylvania
- Logan Township, Huntingdon County, Pennsylvania
