= Memorial Park Site =

- U.S. National Register of Historic Places
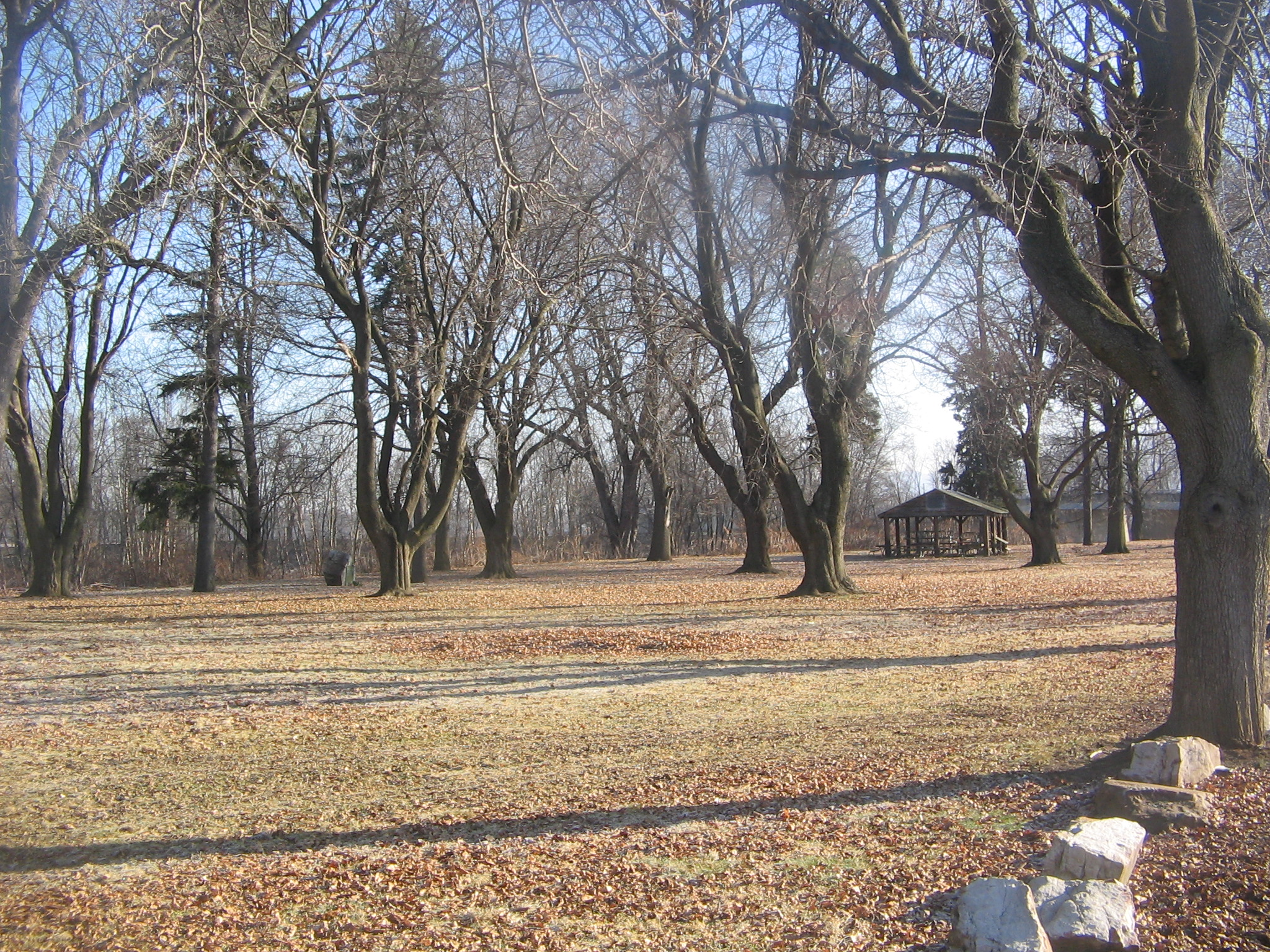
- View of the park

- Location within Pennsylvania Location within the United States
- Location: South Water Street, Lock Haven, Pennsylvania
- Coordinates: 41°8′18″N 77°25′3″W
- Area: 19 acres (7.7 ha)
- NRHP reference No.: 82003783
- Added to NRHP: April 14, 1982

The Memorial Park Site (designated 36CN164) is an archaeological site located near the confluence of Bald Eagle Creek and the West Branch Susquehanna River in Lock Haven in the U.S. state of Pennsylvania. Research projects conducted at the site since 1979 have found prehistoric cultural deposits that collectively span 8,000 years.

Stratified in age-related sequence, the deposits represent every major prehistoric period from the Middle Archaic to the Late Woodland. The site's dominant component holds the remains of an early Late Woodland (500–1000 CE) village inhabited by people of the Clemson Island culture. The convergent streams and their two valleys made the site readily accessible to pre-Columbian people living in both drainage basins. Among the components of the site are two strata, dating from 5000 to 6000 and c. 2600 BP respectively. Both components were radiocarbon dated from fragments of Cucurbita pepo, the squash plant; the absence of wild squash plants near the site and its distance from well-documented wild populations is evidence that the gourds were intentionally brought to the location by humans.

Memorial Park contains the only area on the West Branch side of the point of land between the river and the creek that has not been disturbed by subsequent development. Alluvial deposits 20 to 28 inches (51 to 71 cm) deep cover the site and have protected it from recent activity on the surface. The Veterans of Foreign Wars acquired the property in the 1920s and used it for a park.

Piper Aircraft bought the fields adjacent to the park in the 1960s to use for airport runways and airplane storage. In the 1970s, Conran A. Hay, a consultant, discovered the prehistoric site during an archeological survey conducted for the United States Army Corps of Engineers. Subsequent research sponsored by the Office of State Archeology and the Office of Historic Preservation of the Pennsylvania Historical and Museum Commission in 1980 helped determine the site boundaries.

== See also ==
- List of archaeological periods (North America)
- List of Native American archaeological sites on the National Register of Historic Places in Pennsylvania
- National Register of Historic Places listings in Clinton County, Pennsylvania
