= Heisey House =

Historic house in Pennsylvania, United States

- U.S. National Register of Historic Places
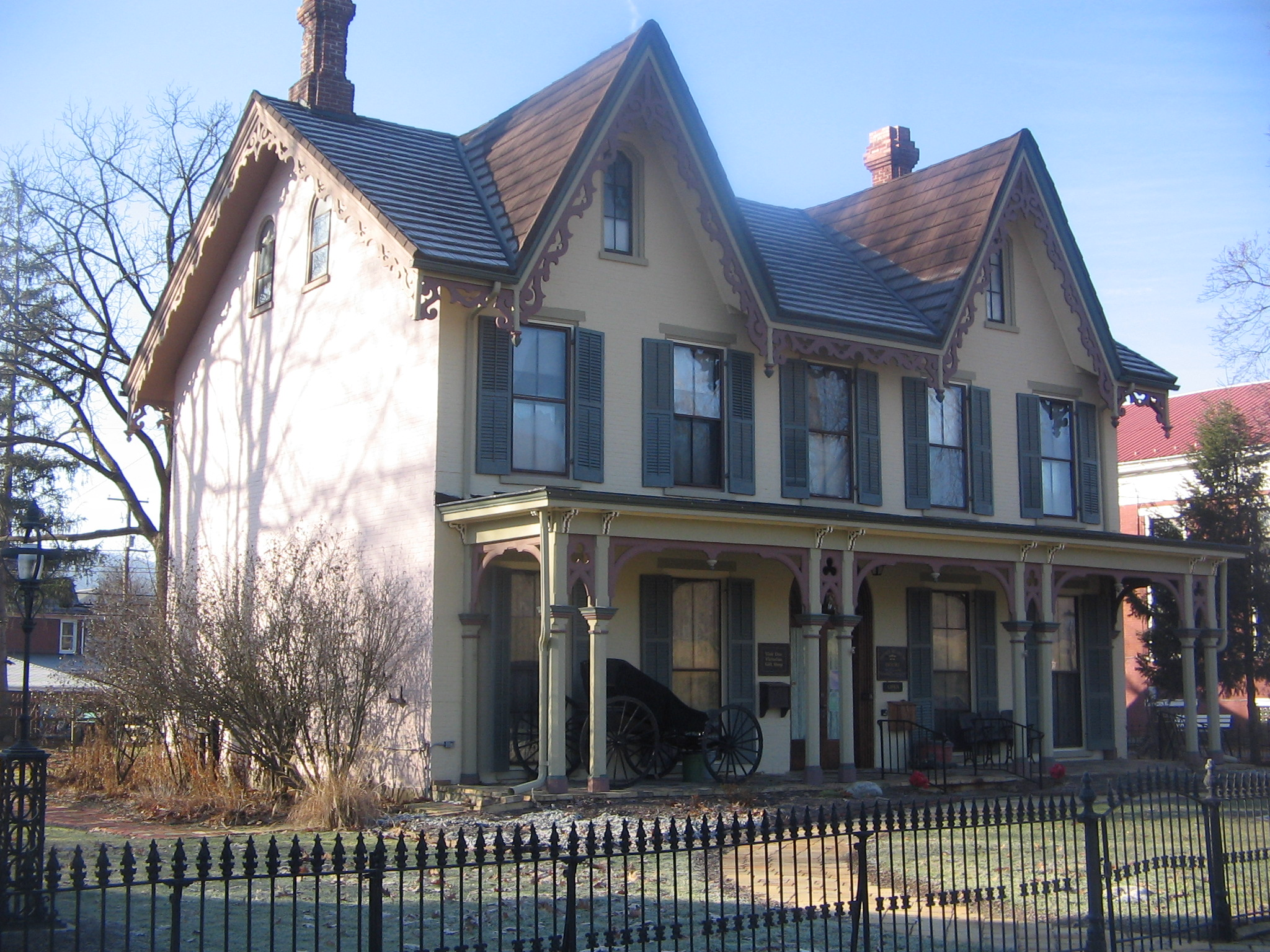
- Heisey House, January 2010

- Location within Pennsylvania Location within the United States
- Interactive map showing the location of Heisey House
- Location: 362 East Water Street, Lock Haven, Pennsylvania
- Coordinates: 41°08′15″N 77°26′24″W
- Built: 1833
- Architectural style: Gothic Revival
- NRHP reference No.: 72001113
- Added to NRHP: March 16, 1972

Heisey House was the first brick dwelling in Lock Haven, county seat of Clinton County, a city built along the West Branch Canal in the U.S. state of Pennsylvania. Constructed about 1831, the building served as a tavern and inn in its early days, and the town's founder, Jeremiah Church, boarded there.

Heisey House was added to the National Register of Historic Places in 1972.

== History ==
The house was built about 1831 by Dr. John Henderson of Huntington County as a brick Federal farmhouse. The bricks were shipped into town on canal boats. Henderson was the son-in-law of local landowner John Fleming. Jerry Church, the founder of Lock Haven lived here when the building was used as a tavern. Roger Develing and his son John who immigrated from Ireland owned the tavern. After Church owned the house, Dr. William J. Henderson purchased it in 1852 and practiced medicine there. The Heisey family owned the stucco-covered house from 1875 through 1960, when ownership passed to the Clinton County Historical Society.

The Clinton County Historical Society maintains its headquarters in the 2.5-story building, which it operates as a museum. Substantially unchanged from its mid-19th-century condition, the Victorian interior of the house includes furniture from that era. Local archaeological artifacts are displayed in the house's ice house.

== See also ==
- National Register of Historic Places listings in Clinton County, Pennsylvania
