= List of Pennsylvania state historical markers in Cameron County =

Location of Cameron County in Pennsylvania

This is a list of the Pennsylvania state historical markers in Cameron County.

This is intended to be a complete list of the official state historical markers placed in Cameron County, Pennsylvania by the Pennsylvania Historical and Museum Commission (PHMC). The locations of the historical markers, as well as the latitude and longitude coordinates as provided by the PHMC's database, are included below when available. There are 7 historical markers located in Cameron County.

== Historical markers ==
Marker title	Image	Date dedicated	Location	Marker type	Topics
Allegheny Portage		August 25, 1949	Junction East Allegheny Avenue (PA 120) & PA 155, Emporium; 41.50802°N 78.22032°W	Roadside	Native American, Transportation
Bucktails, The		February 8, 1950	Junction 3rd Street (PA 120) & Bridge Street (PA 555), Driftwood; 41.339485°N 78.134104°W	Roadside	Civil War, Military
Cameron County		September 14, 1982	County Courthouse, East 5th Street between North Cherry & Chestnut Streets, Emporium; 41.5128°N 78.23642°W	City	Government & Politics, Government & Politics 19th Century
Portage Path		October 10, 1950	PA 155, 5.5 miles north of Emporium (MISSING)	Roadside	Native American, Navigation, Paths & Trails, Transportation
Sinnemahoning Path		February 9, 1950	CCC Memorial Highway (PA 120), 3.8 miles south of Emporium; 41.46368°N 78.19812°W	Roadside	Native American, Paths & Trails, Transportation
Sinnemahoning Path		February 9, 1950	PA 120, 1.5 miles north of Driftwood (MISSING)	Roadside	Native American, Paths & Trails, Transportation
Tom Mix		May 28, 1955	Across creek from birthplace, Low Grade Road (PA 555), west of Driftwood; 41.340250°N 78.188733°W	Roadside	Motion Pictures & Television

== See also ==
- List of Pennsylvania state historical markers
