= List of Pennsylvania state historical markers in Clinton County =

Location of Clinton County in Pennsylvania

This is a list of the Pennsylvania state historical markers in Clinton County.

This is intended to be a complete list of the official state historical markers placed in Clinton County, Pennsylvania by the Pennsylvania Historical and Museum Commission (PHMC). The locations of the historical markers, as well as the latitude and longitude coordinates as provided by the PHMC's database, are included below when available. There are 13 historical markers located in Clinton County.

== Historical markers ==
| Marker title | Image | Date dedicated | Location | Marker type | Topics |
| Clinton County | | June 12, 1982 | Clinton Co. Courthouse, Jay & Water Sts., Lock Haven; 41.137870°N 77.442350°W | City | Business & Industry, Government & Politics, Government & Politics 19th Century |
| Daniel H. Hastings | | October 9, 1950 | Pa. 64 at Pa. 477 NW of Salona; 41.090710°N 77.479550°W | Roadside | Agriculture, Government & Politics, Government & Politics 19th Century, Governors |
| Fort Horn | | July 14, 1949 | Pa. 150, 4 miles NE of Lock Haven (Missing); 41.168500°N 77.368520°W | Roadside | American Revolution, Forts, Military |
| Fort Reed | | April 29, 1947 | Pa. 120 (W. Main St. & W. Water St.), Lock Haven; 41.141260°N 77.457400°W | Roadside | Forts, French & Indian War, Military |
| Great Shamokin Path | | January 24, 1950 | Eagle Valley Rd. (PA 150/old US 220) near Beech Creek Ave., Mill Hall Boro; 41.112230°N 77.498580°W | Roadside | Native American, Paths & Trails, Transportation |
| Leidy Natural Gas Boom | | July 29, 1975 | SR 4001 just W of the Leidy Bridge, Leidy Twp. 41.404570°N 77.922200°W | Roadside | Business & Industry, Oil & Gas |
| Pennsylvania Canal (West Branch Division) | | June 16, 1952 | E Main St. (PA 150), between Jay & Locust Alley, Lock Haven; 41.136780°N 77.441470°W | Roadside | Canals, Navigation, Transportation |
| Piper Aircraft Corporation | | June 18, 2024 | In front of the Piper Aviation Museum; 41.133727°N 77.427609°W | Roadside | Business & Industry |
| Shamokin Path | | May 3, 1949 | Pa. 150, 6 miles NE of Lock Haven (Missing); 41.178740°N 77.343290°W | Roadside | Native American, Paths & Trails, Transportation |
| Sinnemahoning Path | | February 2, 1950 | Pa. 120, 14 miles NW of Lock Haven (Missing); 41.251810°N 77.611370°W | Roadside | Native American, Paths & Trails, Transportation |
| The Great Island | | May 3, 1949 | Pa. 150 (old U.S. 220), 1.3 miles NE of Lock Haven; 41.147990°N 77.411200°W | Roadside | Native American |
| Tiadaghton Elm | | April 30, 1947 | River Rd. (SR 1016 / old US 220), at Bonner Ln., SE of Avis; 41.180050°N 77.278880°W | Roadside | Government & Politics, Government & Politics 18th Century |
| Tiadaghton Elm | | May 6, 1947 | PA 220 northbound, just SW of exit 120 (PA44 N, Pine Creek), NE of Avis; 41.194590°N 77.299840°W | Roadside | Government & Politics, Government & Politics 18th Century |

== See also ==
- List of Pennsylvania state historical markers
- National Register of Historic Places listings in Clinton County, Pennsylvania
