= Water Street District (Lock Haven, Pennsylvania) =

Historic district in Pennsylvania, United States

- U.S. National Register of Historic Places
- U.S. Historic district
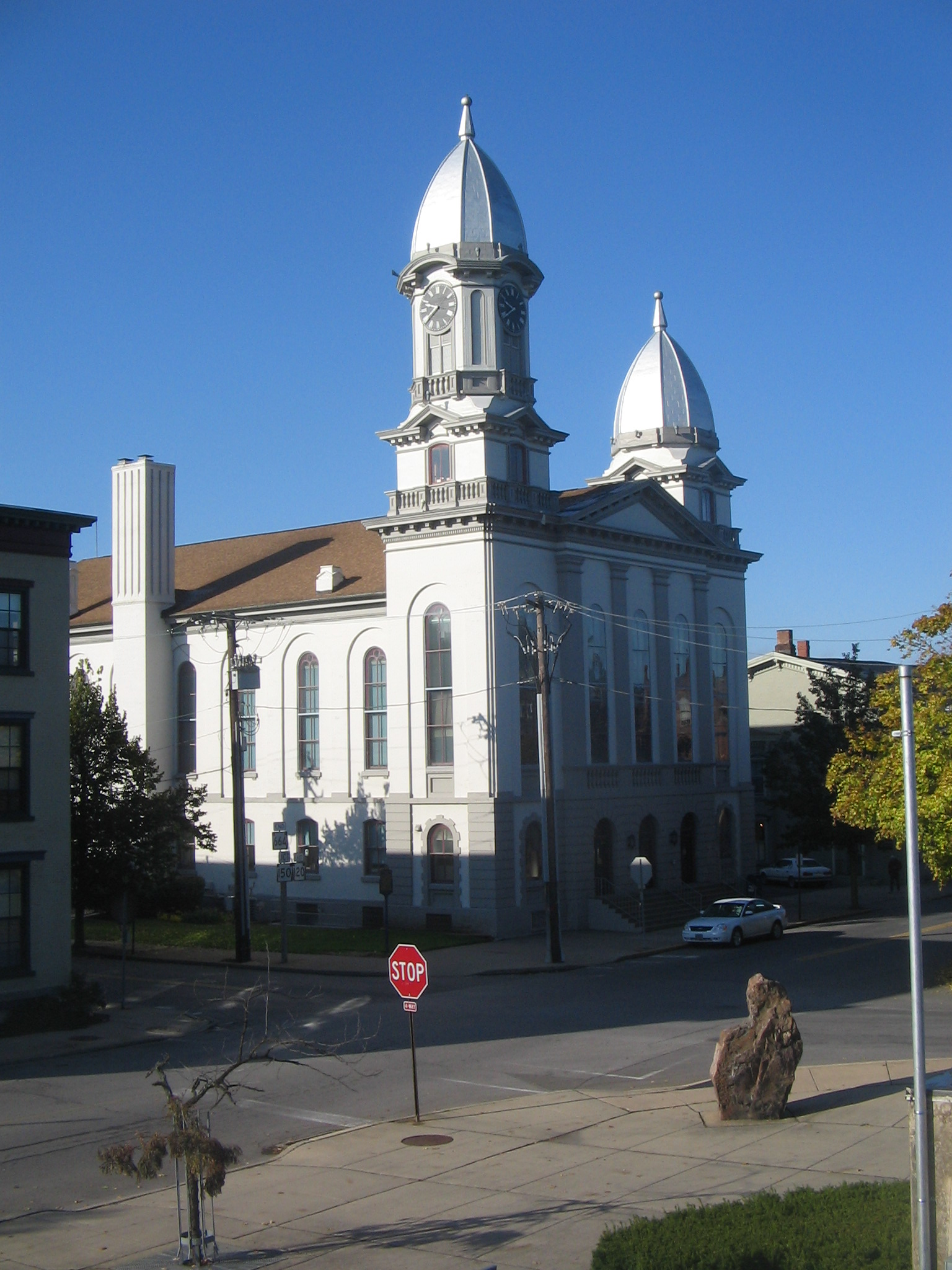
- Clinton County Courthouse, an example of Italian Villa style architecture found in the district

- Location within Pennsylvania Location within the United States
- Location: Near the West Branch Susquehanna River in downtown Lock Haven, Pennsylvania
- Coordinates: 41°08′17″N 77°26′58″W
- Built: Mid- to late 19th century
- NRHP reference No.: 73001618
- Added to NRHP: July 10, 1973

The Water Street District, a large part of downtown Lock Haven in the U.S. state of Pennsylvania, is a historic district added to the National Register of Historic Places (NRHP) in 1973. The district includes the city's entire central business district as well as many homes and churches constructed in the 19th century, especially during the Victorian era. An inventory of the district in 1973 listed more than 365 historic resources, many of which were associated with wealth created by the lumber industry.

A partial list of the historic structures in the district include the L.A. Mackey House (1854), a Federal-Tuscan Transitional dwelling; the David Carskaddon Homestead (1858), in the Italian Villa style; the James White House (1856), a Greek Revival-Tuscan Transitional dwelling; the Winslow-Crawford House (1855), a dwelling in formal Steamboat Gothic style; the Craig-Furst House (1860), in Gothic Revival style; the Clinton County Courthouse (1867), in Italian Villa style; the Jacob Graftius House (1857), in Federal-Tuscan Transitional style, and the W.A. Simpson House (between 1872 and 1880), a three-story brick dwelling covered with wood made to look like dressed stones. At least eight other important historic buildings, the canal lock from which Lock Haven got its name, and the site of Fort Reed, the last of a chain of early forts along the West Branch Susquehanna River, are also within the district.

The district is bounded roughly by the river on the north; North Henderson Street on the east; Bellefonte Avenue, Mary's Alley, and the Penn Central Railroad right-of-way on the south, and Sixth Street on the west.{{#tag:ref|The coordinates, taken from the NRHP nomination form, that define the district are as follows: northwest corner 41°08′33″N 77°27′29″W; northeast corner 41°08′17″N 77°26′18″W; southeast corner 41°08′2.5″N 77°26′24″W; and southwest corner 41°08′18″N 77°27′35″W.

The NRHP is the official federal list of properties of architectural, archeological, cultural, or engineering significance in U.S. history. Benefits of listing include qualification for federal historic-preservation planning and, if available, funding, as well as possible tax relief.

== See also ==
- National Register of Historic Places listings in Clinton County, Pennsylvania

== Notes and references ==
Notes
