= WSQV =

Coordinates: 41.147°N 77.487°W

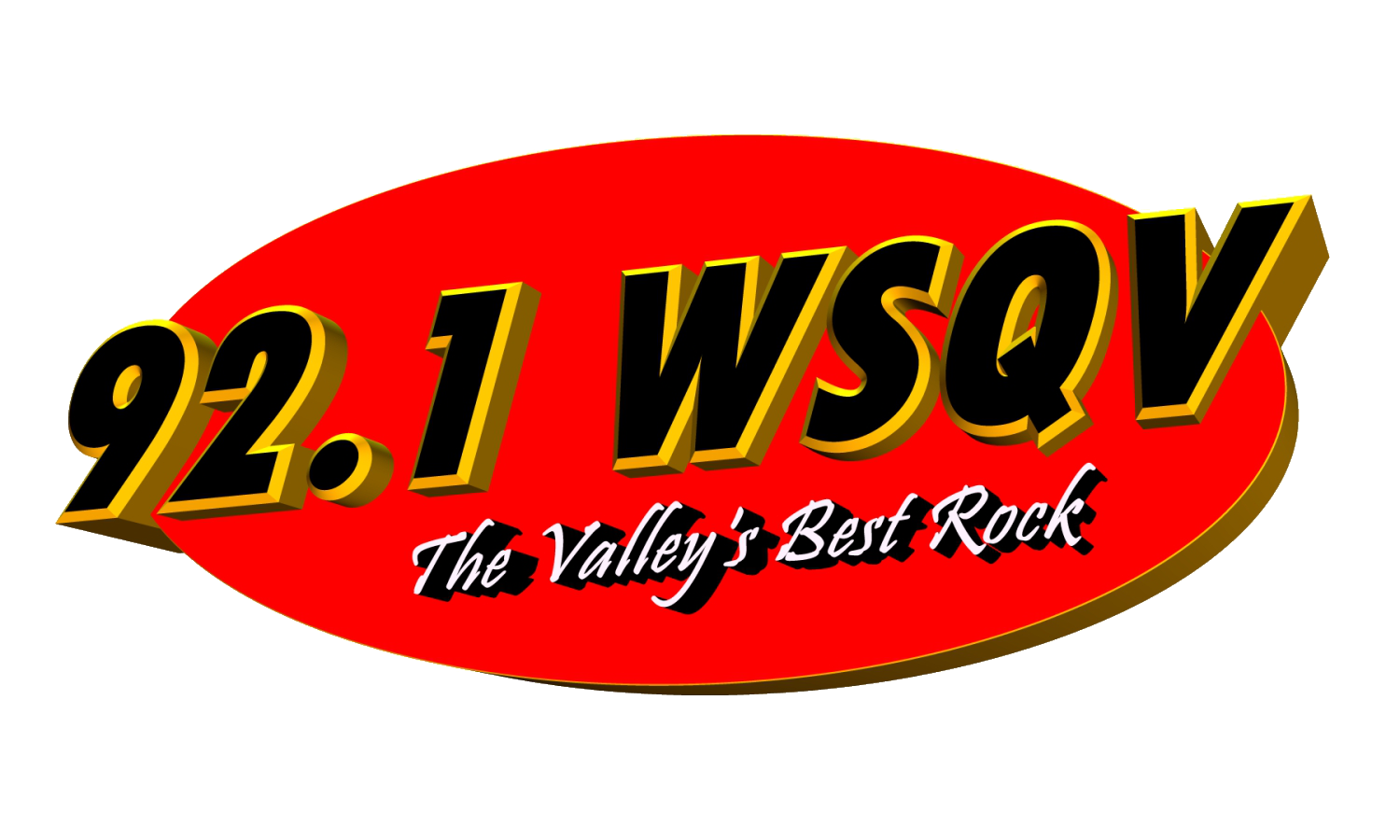
- Lock Haven, Pennsylvania; United States
- Broadcast area: Clinton, Centre and Lycoming counties
- Frequency: 92.1 MHz
- Branding: 92.1 WSQV

Programming
- Format: Classic rock

Ownership
- Owner: Schlesinger Communications Inc.
- Sister stations: WBPZ

History
- Former call signs: WCNM (1983–1986); WWZU (1986–1990); WSNU (1990–2010)

Technical information
- Licensing authority: FCC
- Facility ID: 37741
- Class: A
- ERP: 6,000 watts
- HAAT: 70 meters
- Repeater: WVSQ (106.9 MHz)

Links
- Public license information: Public file; LMS
- Webcast: Listen Live
- Website: www.wsqvradio.com

WSQV (92.1 FM is a radio station licensed to Lock Haven, Pennsylvania and serving the central Pennsylvania area.) Using the tagline: "The Valley's Best Rock," WSQV serves Clinton, Centre, and Lycoming counties with a classic rock format. The radio station is designed for the specific wants and needs of central Pennsylvania. Locally owned and independently operated by Schlesinger Communications, Inc. Daily programming on WSQV includes rock music, news, sports, weather, public service and more.
