= Sinnemahoning Path =

Coordinates: 41.294°N 78.112°W

- Location: Pennsylvania, United States
- Designation: Pennsylvania state historic markers
- Trailheads: Lock Haven – Keating – Port Allegany
- Use: Historic Native American trail

The Sinnemahoning Path is an ancient trail in Pennsylvania which passes through Keating on its way to the upper Alleghenies. The Sinnemahoning Path followed the West Branch of the Susquehanna from “the Great Island” at Lock Haven to the Sinnemahoning Creek at Keating, to Portage Creek, then to Canoe Place near Port Allegany and on to the Seneca country in the upper Alleghenies.

On February 9, 1950, the Pennsylvania Historical and Museum Commission dedicated three state historic markers noting the historic importance of the Sinnemahoning Path, with two in Cameron County and one in Clinton County.
