= Logan Mills Covered Bridge =

- U.S. National Register of Historic Places
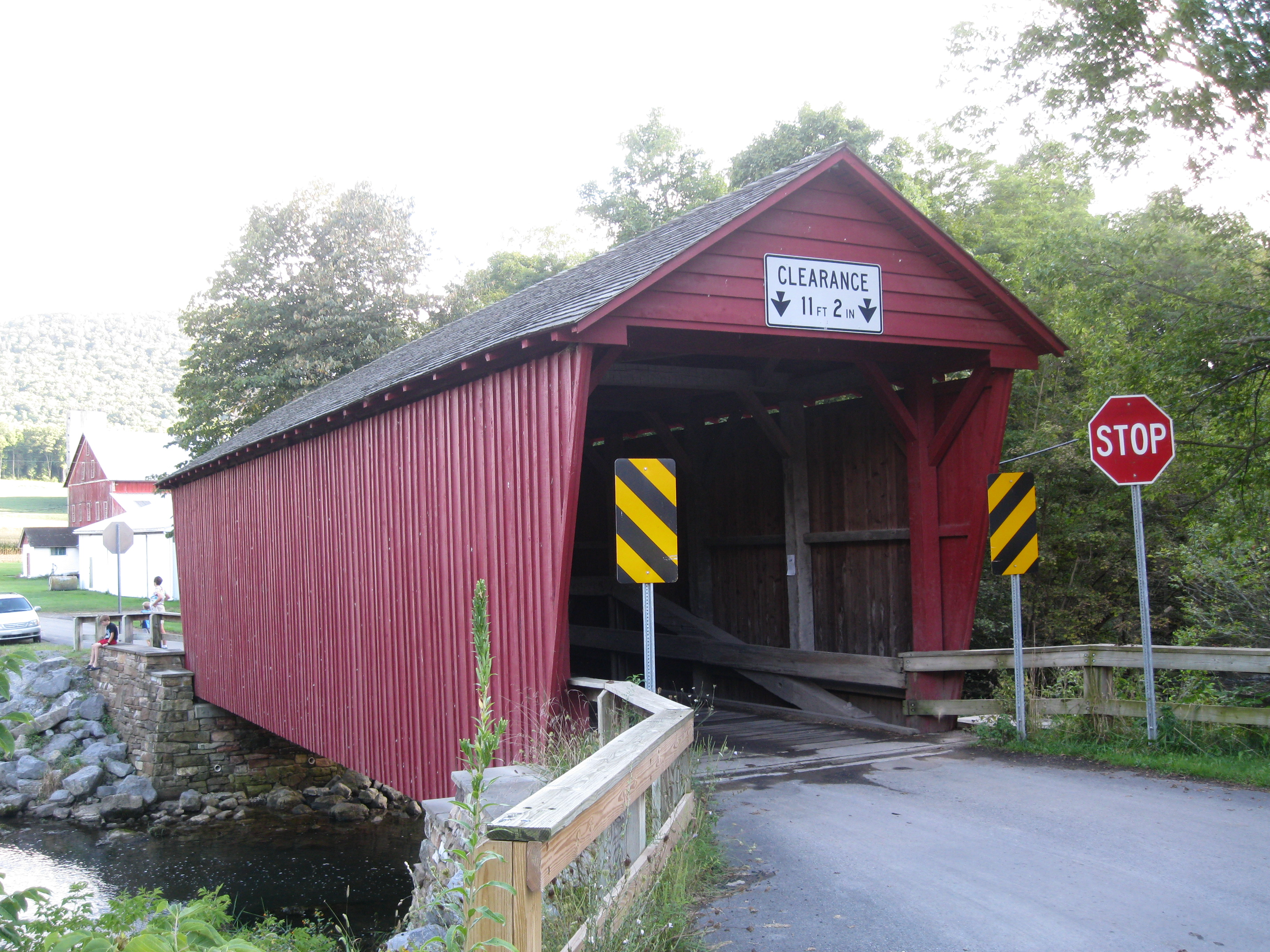
- Logan Mills Covered Bridge in 2012

- Location within Pennsylvania Location within the United States
- Location: Southwest of Loganton over Fishing Creek, Logan Township, Pennsylvania
- Coordinates: 41°0′20″N 77°23′11″W
- Area: 0.1 acres (0.040 ha)
- Built: 1874
- Architectural style: Queen post truss
- NRHP reference No.: 79002213
- Added to NRHP: August 6, 1979

The Logan Mills Covered Bridge is an historic wooden covered bridge in Logan Township in Clinton County, Pennsylvania, United States.

It was listed on the National Register of Historic Places in 1979.

== History and architectural features ==
This historic structure is a 55-foot-long (17 m) 12-foot-wide (3.7 m), Queen post truss bridge. Built in 1874, it crosses the Fishing Creek, and is the only remaining covered bridge in Clinton County.
