= Logan Mills Gristmill =

- U.S. National Register of Historic Places
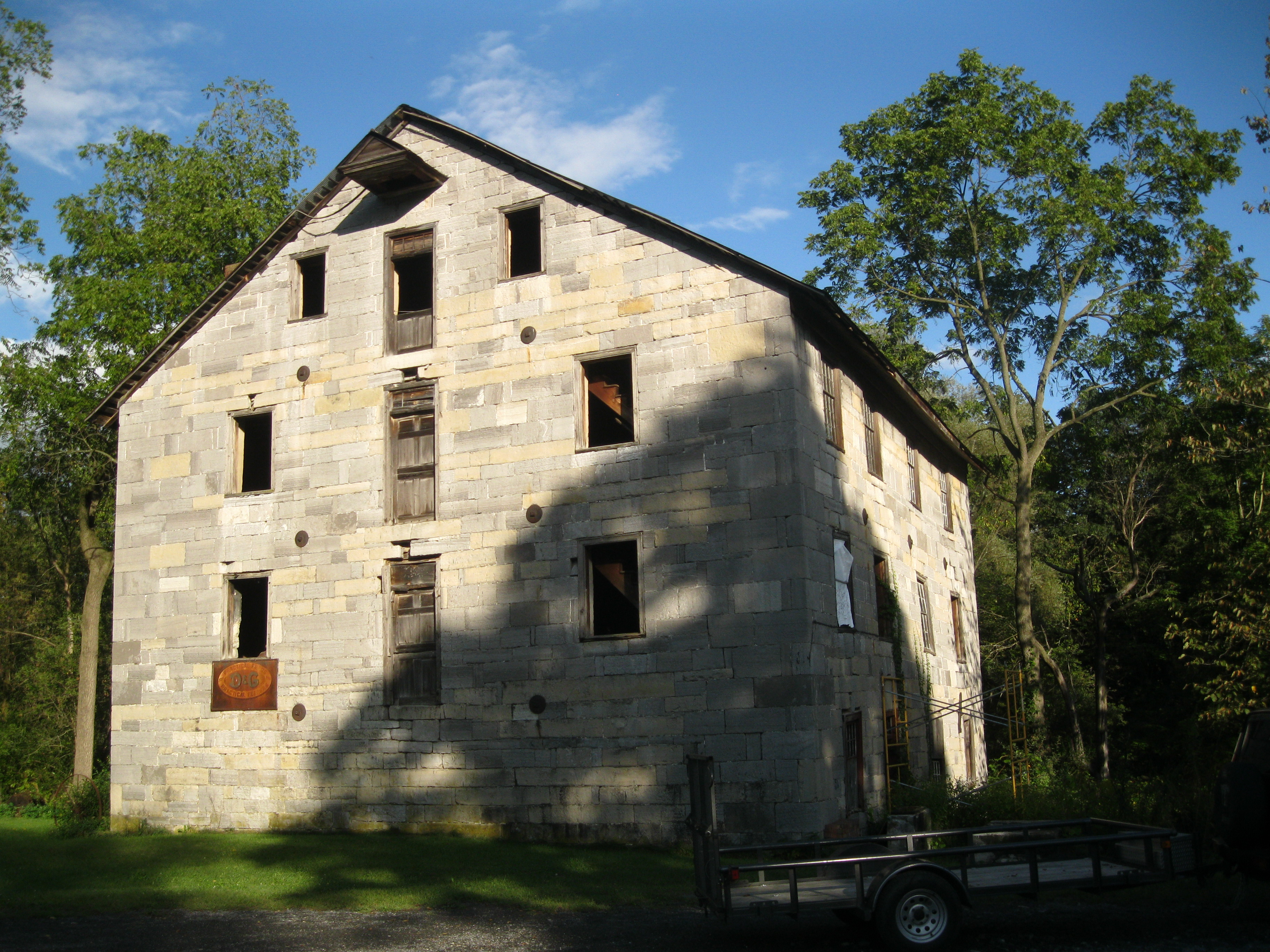
- South and west sides of the Logan Mills Gristmill in 2012

- Location within Pennsylvania Location within the United States
- Location: Off PA 880, Logan Mills, Logan Township, Pennsylvania
- Coordinates: 41°0′23″N 77°23′1″W
- Area: 0.2 acres (0.081 ha)
- Built: c. 1840
- NRHP reference No.: 80003476
- Added to NRHP: August 11, 1980

The Logan Mills Gristmill is a historic grist mill located at Logan Township in Clinton County, Pennsylvania. It was built in about 1840, and is a 3 1/2-story, coursed stone building with a tin-covered gable roof. It is three bays by four bays. It includes most of its original machinery. It was powered by water diverted from Fishing Creek.

It was listed on the National Register of Historic Places in 1969 .
