= Dunnstown, Pennsylvania =

Unincorporated community in Pennsylvania, US

- Census-designated place
- Location in Clinton County and the U.S. state of Pennsylvania.
- Coordinates: 41°8′47″N 77°25′21″W
- Country: United States
- State: Pennsylvania
- County: Clinton
- Township: Woodward

Area
  - Total: 0.84 sq mi (2.17 km^{2})
  - Land: 0.82 sq mi (2.13 km^{2})
  - Water: 0.015 sq mi (0.04 km^{2})
- Elevation: 657 ft (200 m)

Population (2020)
  - Total: 1,464
  - Density: 1,781/sq mi (687.7/km^{2})
- Time zone: UTC-5 (Eastern (EST))
  - Summer (DST): UTC-4 (EDT)
- ZIP code: 17745
- FIPS code: 42-20416
- GNIS feature ID: 1173629

Dunnstown is a census-designated place (CDP) in Clinton County, Pennsylvania, United States. The population was 1,360 at the 2010 census.

== Geography ==
Dunnstown is located in eastern Clinton County at 41°8′47″N 77°25′21″W (41.146498, -77.422450), in the southeastern corner of Woodward Township. It is on the north bank of the West Branch Susquehanna River, and Pennsylvania Route 150 (Woodward Avenue) crosses the river from the southwest corner of Dunnstown into the city of Lock Haven, the county seat. PA 150 leads east 6 miles (10 km) to the borough of Avis. Dunnstown is bordered on the east by Dunnstable Township. Pennsylvania Route 664 leads north from Dunnstown 16 miles (26 km) to Haneyville.

According to the United States Census Bureau, Dunnstown CDP has a total area of 0.84 square miles (2.17 km^{2}), of which 0.82 square miles (2.13 km^{2}) is land and 0.02 square miles (0.04 km^{2}), or 1.86%, is water.

== Demographics ==
Historical population
Census	Pop.	Note	%±
2020	1,464		—
U.S. Decennial Census

As of the census of 2000, there were 1,365 people, 565 households, and 396 families residing in the CDP. The population density was 1,626.9 inhabitants per square mile (628.1/km^{2}). There were 595 housing units at an average density of 709.2 per square mile (273.8/km^{2}). The racial makeup of the CDP was 99.27% White, 0.44% Asian, and 0.29% from two or more races. Hispanic or Latino of any race were 0.51% of the population.

There were 565 households, out of which 27.3% had children under the age of 18 living with them, 57.7% were married couples living together, 7.8% had a female householder with no husband present, and 29.9% were non-families. 25.1% of all households were made up of individuals, and 14.0% had someone living alone who was 65 years of age or older. The average household size was 2.32 and the average family size was 2.74.

In the CDP, the population was spread out, with 19.7% under the age of 18, 7.9% from 18 to 24, 24.8% from 25 to 44, 25.7% from 45 to 64, and 21.9% who were 65 years of age or older. The median age was 44 years. For every 100 females, there were 90.1 males. For every 100 females age 18 and over, there were 88.0 males.

The median income for a household in the CDP was $38,472, and the median income for a family was $46,250. Males had a median income of $33,631 versus $22,424 for females. The per capita income for the CDP was $20,251. About 2.3% of families and 7.1% of the population were below the poverty line, including 7.4% of those under age 18 and 5.6% of those age 65 or over.
