= Isaac A. Packer Farm =

Historic house in Pennsylvania, United States

- U.S. National Register of Historic Places
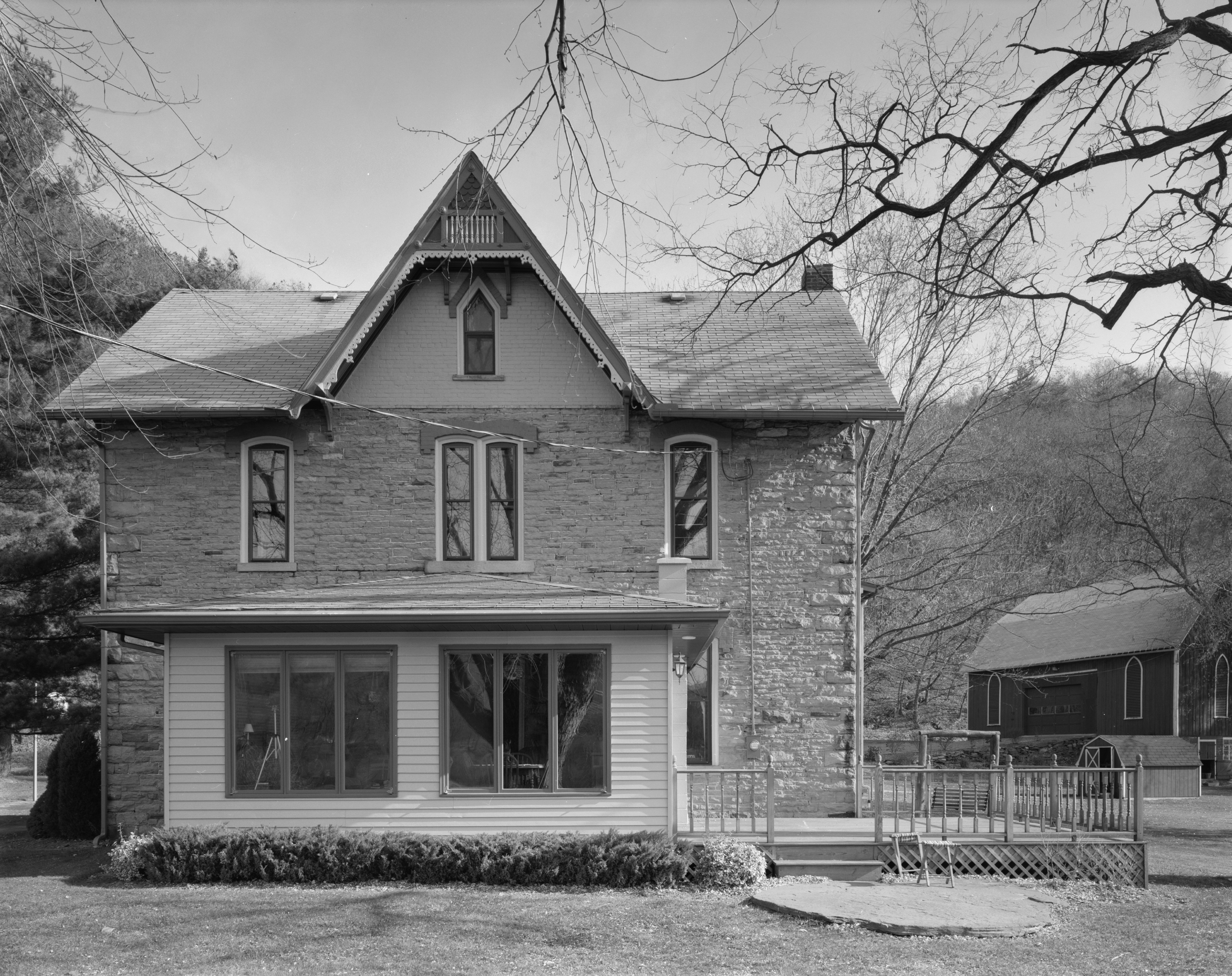
- Isaac A. Packer Farmhouse, Summer 1997

- Location within Pennsylvania Location within the United States
- Location: Farrandsville Road along the West Branch of the Susquehanna River, Woodward Township, Pennsylvania
- Coordinates: 41°9′58″N 77°28′12″W
- Area: 1.9 acres (0.77 ha)
- Built: 1885
- Architect: Alan Lawrence
- Architectural style: Vernacular Late Victorian Gothic
- NRHP reference No.: 91000092
- Added to NRHP: February 21, 1991

The Isaac A. Packer Farm is an historic home and farm complex which is located in Woodward Township in Clinton County, Pennsylvania, United States.

It was listed on the National Register of Historic Places in 1991.

== History and architectural features ==
The farmhouse was built in 1885, and is a 2 1/2-story, L-shaped stone dwellingwhich was designed in the Victorian Gothic style. The house is built from sandstone in hues of purple and gray. Also located on the property are a contributing three-story bank barn (1905), a stone lime kiln, and a well (1886).
