= Woodward Township, Clinton County, Pennsylvania =

Township in Pennsylvania, US

Coordinates: 41°12′00″N 77°27′59″W

- Township
- Location in Clinton County and the state of Pennsylvania.
- Country: United States
- State: Pennsylvania
- County: Clinton
- Settled: 1792
- Incorporated: 1841

Area
  - Total: 18.21 sq mi (47.17 km^{2})
  - Land: 17.83 sq mi (46.18 km^{2})
  - Water: 0.39 sq mi (1.00 km^{2})

Population (2010)
  - Total: 2,372
  - Estimate (2016): 2,386
  - Density: 133.8/sq mi (51.67/km^{2})
- FIPS code: 42-035-86448
- Website: https://woodwardtownshippa.org/

Woodward Township is a township in Clinton County, Pennsylvania, United States. The population was 2,372 at the 2010 census.

== History ==
The Isaac A. Packer Farm was listed on the National Register of Historic Places in 1991.

== Geography ==
The township is located in eastern Clinton County on the north side of the West Branch Susquehanna River. The city of Lock Haven, the county seat, is directly across the river on the south side. The unincorporated community of Dunnstown is in the southeastern part of the township, on the northern side of the river.

According to the United States Census Bureau, Woodward Township has a total area of 18.2 square miles (47.2 km^{2}), of which 17.8 square miles (46.2 km^{2}) is land and 0.4 square miles (1.0 km^{2}), or 2.11%, is water.

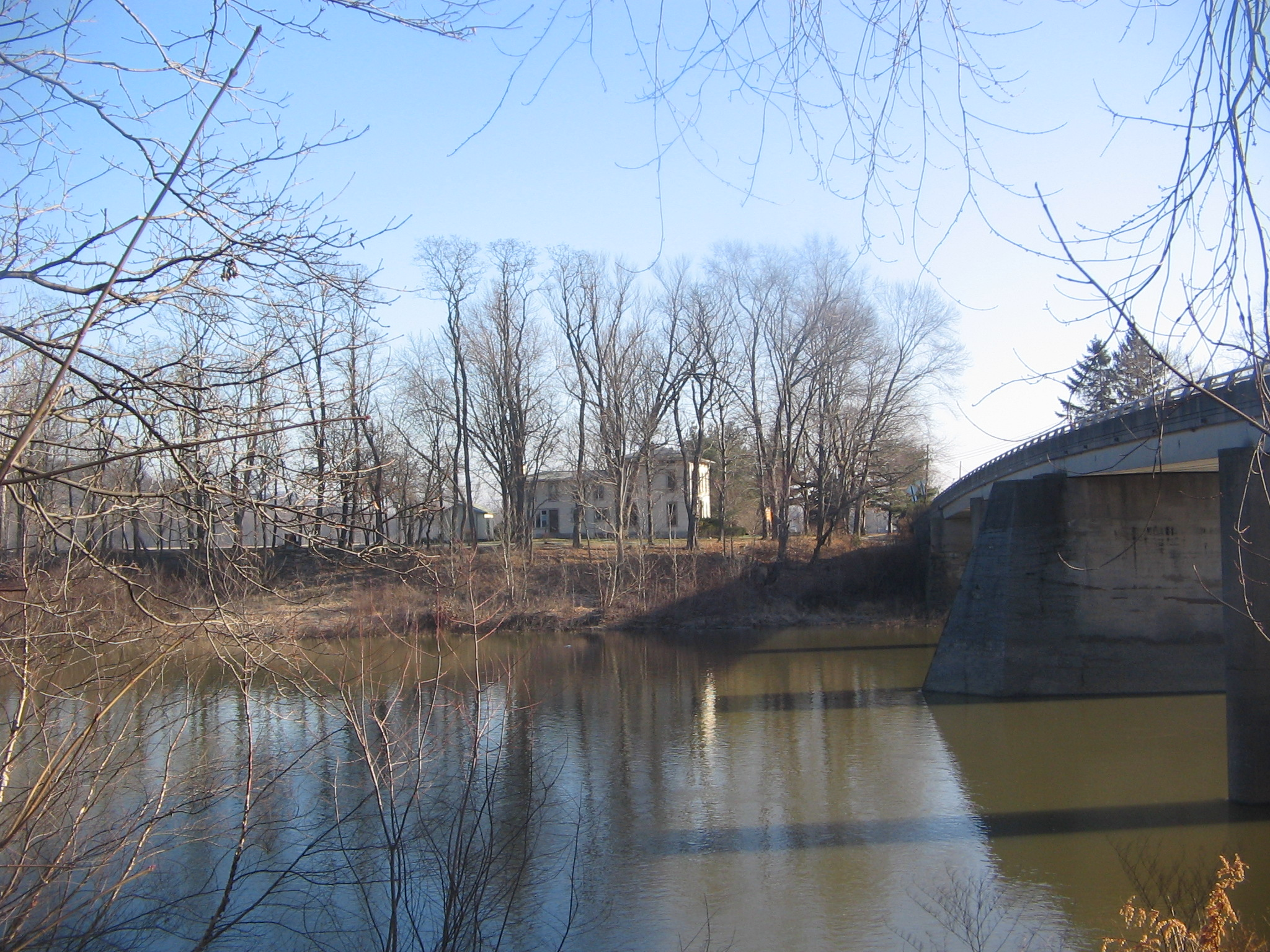
View of the West Branch Susquehanna River and Great Island in Woodward Township

== Demographics ==
As of the census of 2000, there were 2,296 people, 954 households, and 673 families residing in the township. The population density was 128.1 inhabitants per square mile (49.5/km^{2}). There were 1,050 housing units at an average density of 58.6 per square mile (22.6/km^{2}). The racial makeup of the township was 98.69% White, 0.09% Native American, 0.44% Asian, 0.04% Pacific Islander, and 0.74% from two or more races. Hispanic or Latino of any race were 0.70% of the population.

There were 954 households, out of which 25.6% had children under the age of 18 living with them, 60.8% were married couples living together, 6.3% had a female householder with no husband present, and 29.4% were non-families. 24.7% of all households were made up of individuals, and 14.3% had someone living alone who was 65 years of age or older. The average household size was 2.34 and the average family size was 2.77.

In the township the population was spread out, with 20.0% under the age of 18, 6.6% from 18 to 24, 24.9% from 25 to 44, 27.2% from 45 to 64, and 21.3% who were 65 years of age or older. The median age was 44 years. For every 100 females, there were 92.9 males. For every 100 females age 18 and over, there were 91.4 males.

Historical population
Census	Pop.	Note	%±
1980	2,894		—
1990	2,662		−8.0%
2000	2,296		−13.7%
2010	2,372		3.3%
2016 (est.)	2,386		0.6%

The median income for a household in the township was $38,972, and the median income for a family was $46,136. Males had a median income of $32,461 versus $22,337 for females. The per capita income for the township was $21,554. About 2.5% of families and 6.1% of the population were below the poverty line, including 5.5% of those under age 18 and 5.5% of those age 65 or over.
