= WBPZ =

Radio station in Lock Haven, Pennsylvania

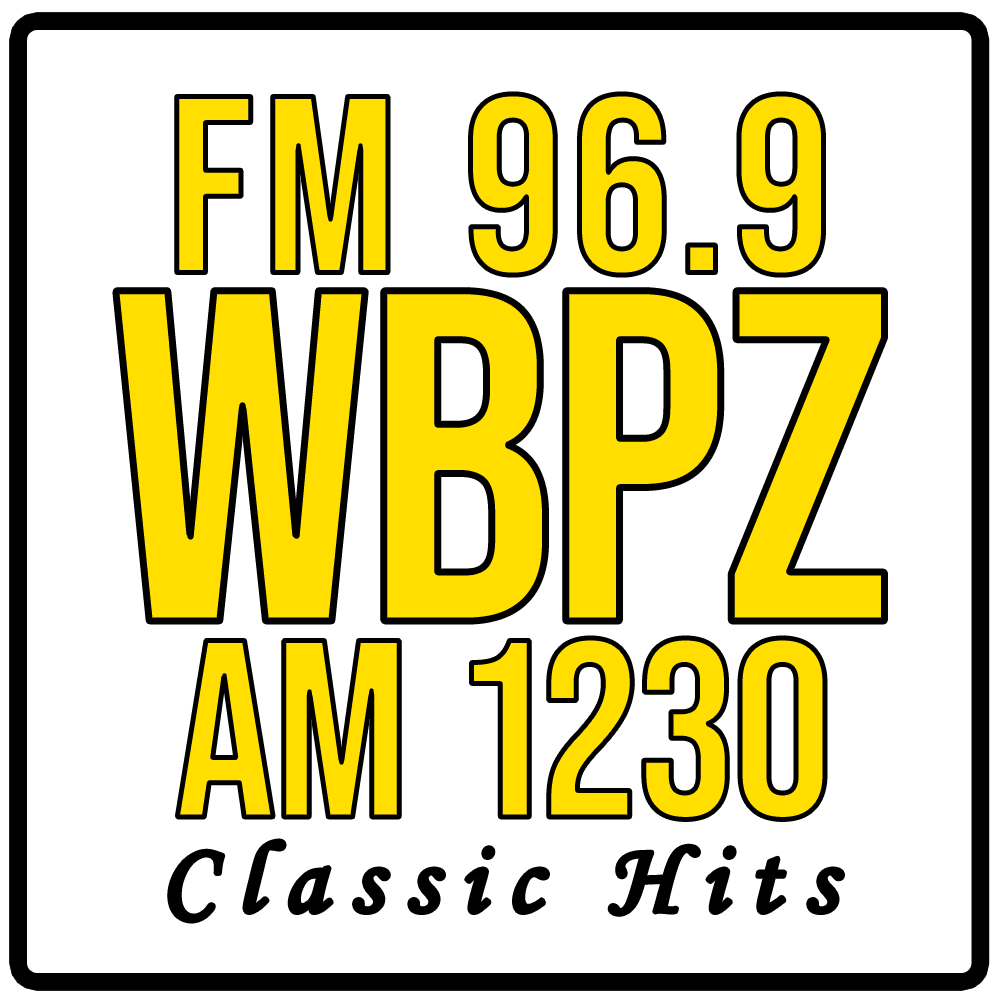
- Lock Haven, Pennsylvania; United States
- Frequency: 1230 kHz
- Branding: WBPZ FM 96.9 AM 1230

Programming
- Format: Classic hits

Ownership
- Owner: Schlesinger Communications Inc
- Sister stations: WSQV

History
- First air date: 1947

Technical information
- Licensing authority: FCC
- Facility ID: 37740
- Class: C
- Power: 1,000 watts unlimited
- Transmitter coordinates: 41°8′3.00″N 77°28′9.00″W
- Translator: 96.9 W245DB (Lock Haven)

Links
- Public license information: Public file; LMS
- Webcast: Listen Live
- Website: wbpzradio.com

WBPZ (1230 AM) is a radio station licensed to Lock Haven, Pennsylvania, United States. The station is owned by Schlesinger Communications LLC and was purchased in October 2010. It was also the oldest and westernmost radio affiliate of the Philadelphia Phillies until 2008. In late 2019, AM 1230 WBPZ began broadcasting on 96.9 FM as well as AM 1230.

== History ==
WBPZ began broadcasting as a Mutual affiliate with 250 watts of power in February 1947.
