= Fishing Creek (Bald Eagle Creek tributary) =

Tributary of the Bald Eagle Creek in Pennsylvania

Coordinates: 41°07′20″N 77°28′58″W

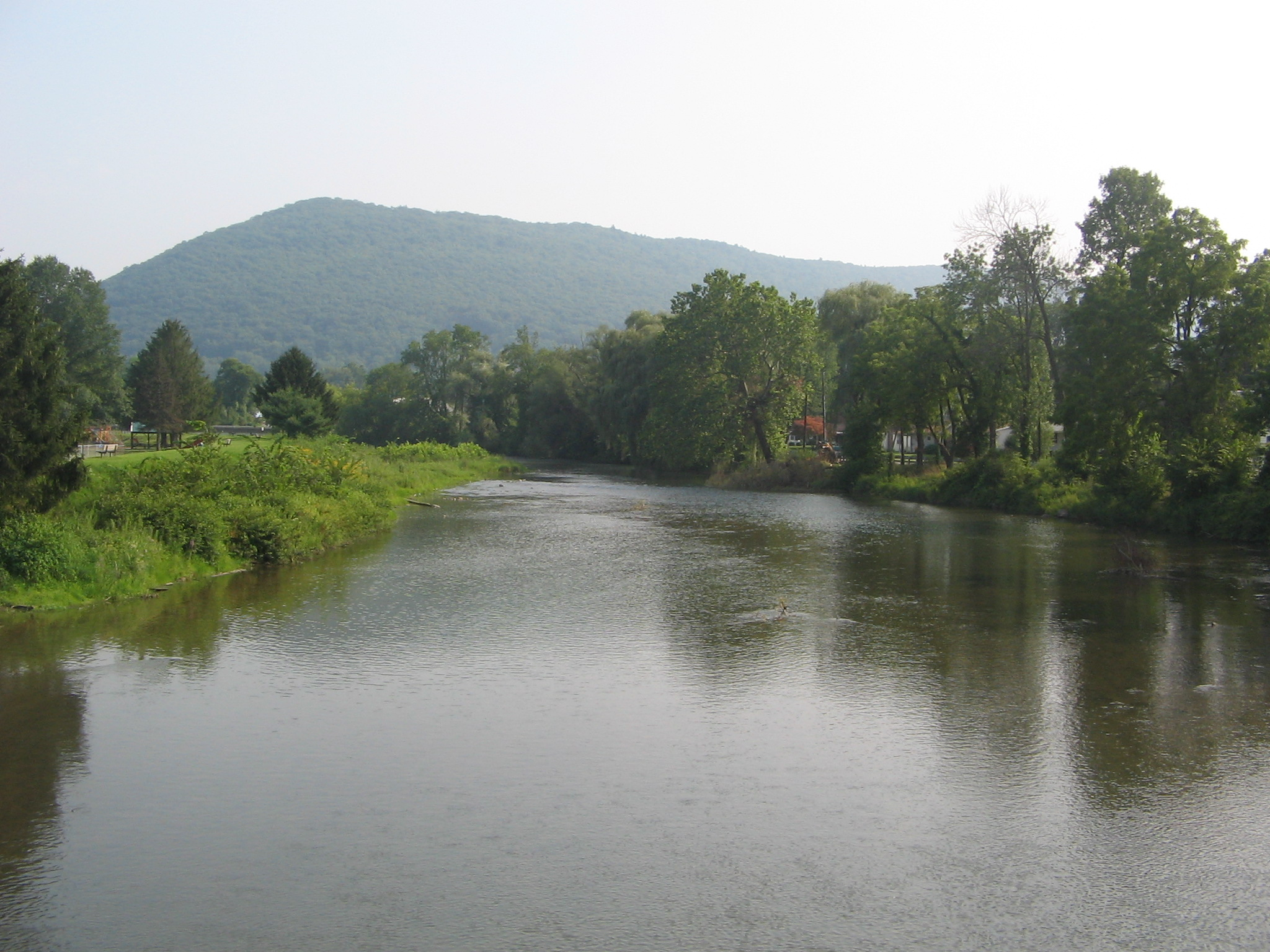
Fishing Creek from Pennsylvania Route 150 near Lock Haven

Fishing Creek is a 42.8-mile-long (68.9 km) tributary of Bald Eagle Creek in Clinton County, Pennsylvania, in the United States.

Fishing Creek passes through a water gap in Bald Eagle Mountain at Mill Hall, and joins Bald Eagle Creek near the borough of Flemington.

The Logan Mills Gristmill was powered by water from Fishing Creek and the Logan Mills Covered Bridge spans Fishing Creek at Logan Township in Clinton County, Pennsylvania.

== See also ==
- List of rivers of Pennsylvania
