= Logan Township, Clinton County, Pennsylvania =

Township in Pennsylvania, US

Coordinates: 40°58′30″N 77°30′00″W

- Township
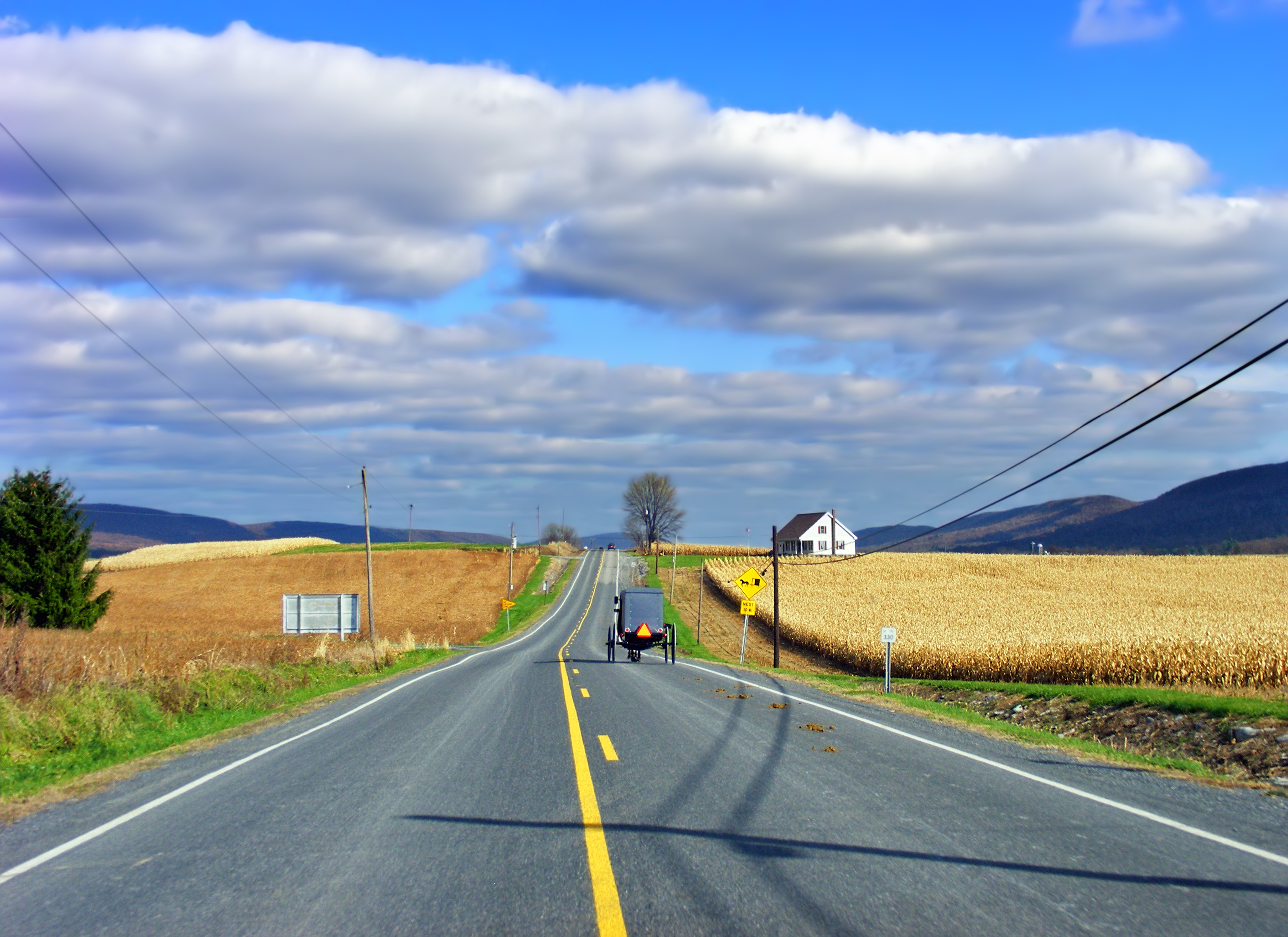
- Pennsylvania Route 880 in Logan Township

- Location in Clinton County and the state of Pennsylvania.
- Country: United States
- State: Pennsylvania
- County: Clinton
- Settled: 1775
- Incorporated: Before 1839

Area
  - Total: 24.25 sq mi (62.82 km^{2})
  - Land: 24.18 sq mi (62.62 km^{2})
  - Water: 0.077 sq mi (0.20 km^{2})

Population (2020)
  - Total: 872 ▲
  - Estimate (2021): 874
  - Density: 34/sq mi (13/km^{2})
- FIPS code: 42-035-44336

Logan Township is a township that is located in Clinton County, Pennsylvania, United States. The population was 872 at the time of the 2020 census.

== History ==
The Logan Mills Covered Bridge and Logan Mills Gristmill are listed on the National Register of Historic Places.

== Geography ==
Logan Township is located in southern Clinton County and is bordered to the south by Centre County. According to the United States Census Bureau, the township has a total area of 24.2 square miles (62.8 km^{2}), of which 24.2 square miles (62.6 km^{2}) is land and 0.08 square miles (0.2 km^{2}), or 0.32%, is water. It contains the census-designated place of Tylersville.

== Demographics ==
Historical population
Census	Pop.	Note	%±
1980	737		—
1990	730		−0.9%
2000	773		5.9%
2010	817		5.7%
2020	872		6.7%
2021 (est.)	874		0.2%

As of the census of 2000, there were 773 people, 265 households, and 215 families residing in the township.

The population density was 32.2 inhabitants per square mile (12.4/km^{2}). There were 338 housing units at an average density of 14.1/sq mi (5.4/km^{2}).

The racial makeup of the township was 98.45% White, 0.26% African American, 0.26% Native American, 0.13% Asian, and 0.91% from two or more races. Hispanic or Latino of any race were 1.42% of the population.

There were 265 households, out of which 35.8% had children under the age of eighteen living with them; 69.4% were married couples living together, 7.5% had a female householder with no husband present, and 18.5% were non-families. 15.1% of all households were made up of individuals, and 9.1% had someone living alone who was sixty-five years of age or older.

The average household size was 2.92 and the average family size was 3.20.

Within the township, the population was spread out, with 28.8% of residents who were under the age of eighteen, 9.1% who were aged eighteen to twenty-four, 27.0% who were aged twenty-five to forty-four, 20.4% from forty-five to sixty-four, and 14.6% who were sixty-five years of age or older. The median age was thirty-six years.

For every one hundred females, there were 100.8 males. For every one hundred females who were aged eighteen or older, there were 99.3 males.

The median income for a household in the township was $31,389, and the median income for a family was $34,688. Males had a median income of $28,250 compared with that of $19,167 for females.

The per capita income for the township was $13,939.

Approximately 7.1% of families and 11.9% of the population were living below the poverty line, including 19.4% of those who were under the age of eighteen and 1.8% of those who were aged sixty-five or older.
