= Bucktail State Park Natural Area =

State park in Pennsylvania, United States

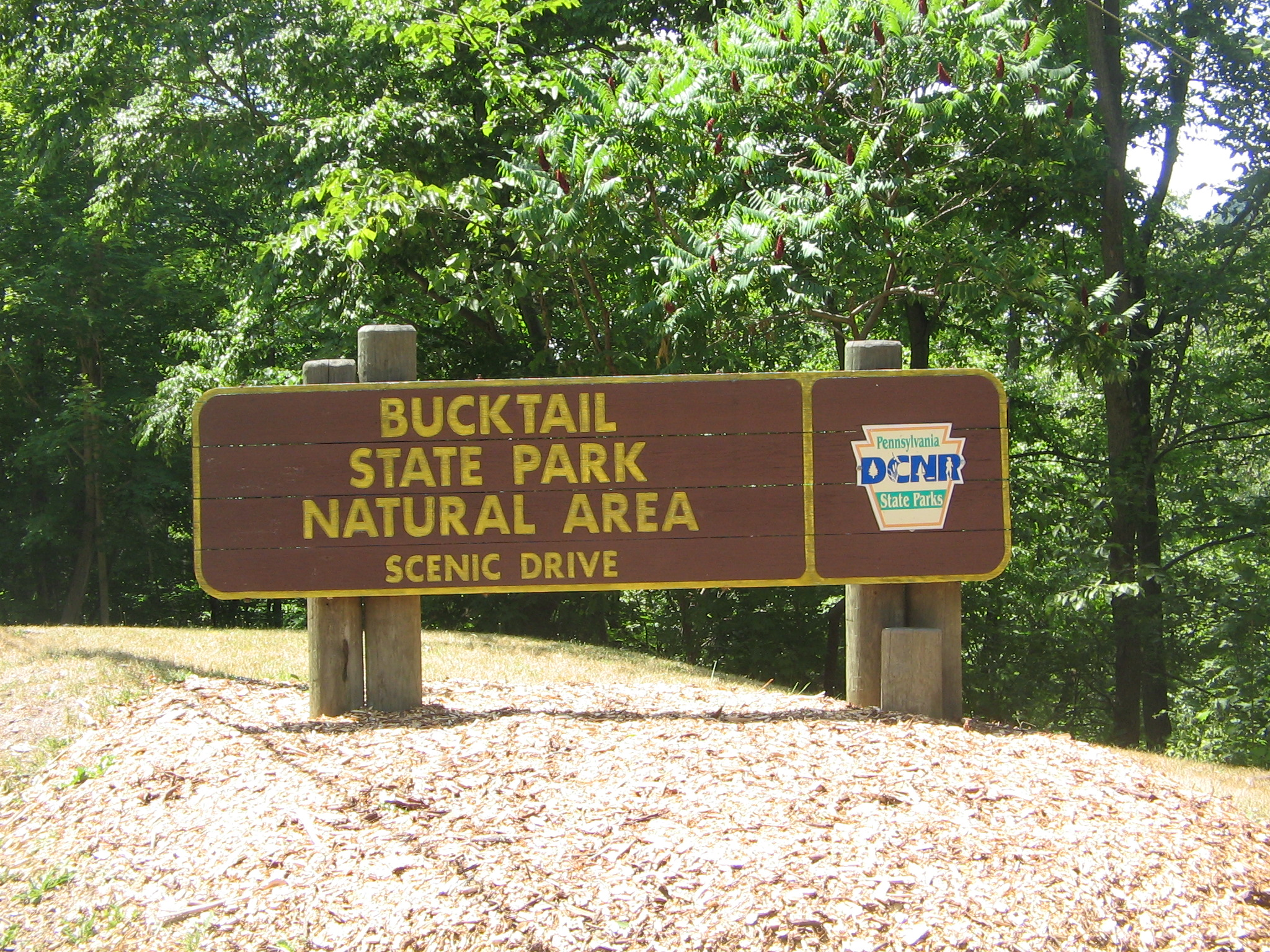
- Sign heading west on PA 120, at the eastern end of Bucktail State Park Natural Area in Clinton County
- Interactive map of Bucktail State Park Natural Area
- Location: Cameron and Clinton counties, Pennsylvania, United States
- Coordinates: 41°20′52″N 77°41′49″W - Northern boundary
- Area: 16,433 acres (6,650 ha)
- Elevation: 1,023 ft (312 m)
- Established: 1933
- Administrator: Pennsylvania Department of Conservation and Natural Resources
- Named for: The Bucktail Regiment
- Website: Official website
- Pennsylvania State Parks

Bucktail State Park Natural Area is a 16,433-acre (6,650 ha) Pennsylvania state park in Cameron and Clinton Counties in Pennsylvania in the United States. The park follows Pennsylvania Route 120 for 75 miles (121 km) between Emporium (in Cameron County, which contains 3,239 acres (1,311 ha) of the park) and Lock Haven (in Clinton County, which contains the other 11,800 acres (4,800 ha)). Bucktail State Park Natural Area park runs along Sinnemahoning Creek and the West Branch Susquehanna River and also passes through Renovo (in Clinton County). The park is named for the Civil War Pennsylvania Bucktails Regiment and is primarily dedicated to wildlife viewing, especially elk.

== Course ==
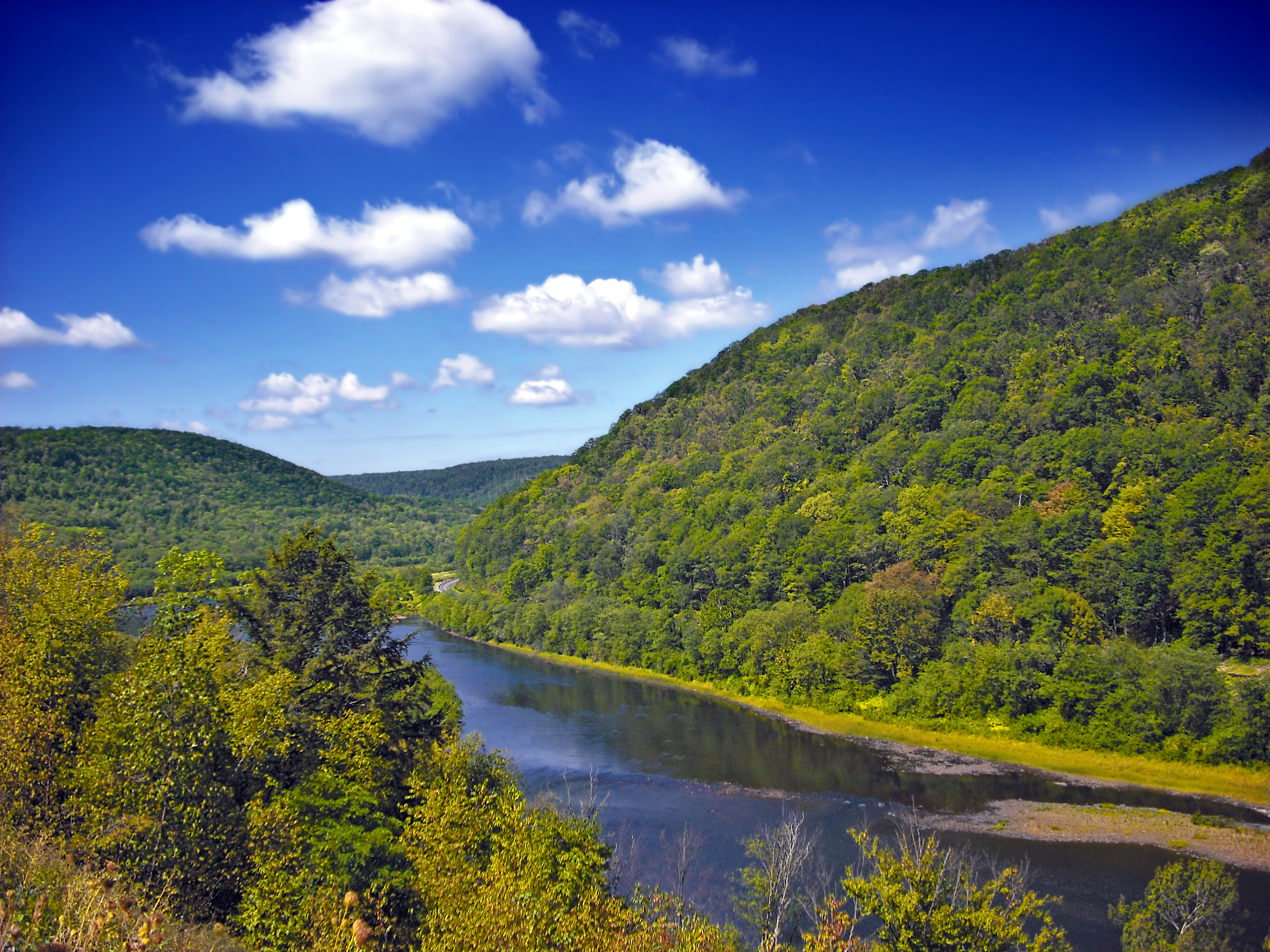
The West Branch Susquehanna River as seen in Bucktail State Park Natural Area

The course of Bucktail State Park Natural Area is as follows: leaving the city of Lock Haven, Pennsylvania Route 120 and the West Branch Susquehanna River pass through the following municipalities in Clinton County heading west (in order): Allison, Woodward, Bald Eagle, Colebrook, Grugan, and Chapman townships, the boroughs of Renovo and South Renovo, and Noyes Township. Next Pennsylvania 120 leaves the West Branch Susquehanna River and follows Sinnemahoning Creek west through East Keating Township, then crosses into Cameron County. There Pennsylvania Route 120 and Sinnemahoning Creek pass west through Grove and Gibson Townships and enter the borough of Driftwood, where Route 120 follows the Driftwood Branch of Sinnemahoning Creek north through Gibson, Lumber, Portage, and Shippen townships, finally reaching the borough of Emporium and the western end of Bucktail State Park.

== History ==
Pennsylvania Route 120 follows an old Native American Trail, the Sinnemahoning Path. This trail was used by Native Americans to cross the eastern continental divide (specifically the Allegheny Front) between the Susquehanna River (which drains into the Chesapeake Bay) and the Allegheny River (which forms the Ohio River with the Monongahela River at Pittsburgh and eventually drains into the Gulf of Mexico via the Mississippi River). American Pioneers also used the trail to make their way west and it was also known as the Bucktail Trail. As the technology of road building advanced, what was once a Native American Trail became the two lane highway known today as Pennsylvania Route 120.

Pennsylvania Route 120 was officially designated as Bucktail State Park in 1933 by an act of the Pennsylvania Legislature. The Act says:

That the Commonwealth of Pennsylvania hereby dedicates to the public, for use as a park and pleasure ground for the benefit and enjoyment of the people, all that area of land extending in length from the western city line of Lock Haven, in Clinton County, to the eastern borough line of Emporium, in The County of Cameron, and along the course of the western branch of the Susquehanna River, and its tributary, Sinnemahoning Creek, in Clinton and Cameron counties, an estimated distance of 75 miles (121 km), and in width from mountain rim to mountain rim across the valley.
The said park shall be called and known as the "Bucktail State Park", in commemoration of the Bucktail Regiment which embarked from Driftwood, in Cameron County, in April, 1861, upon rafts of their own construction to hasten their arrival at the imperiled State Capitol.

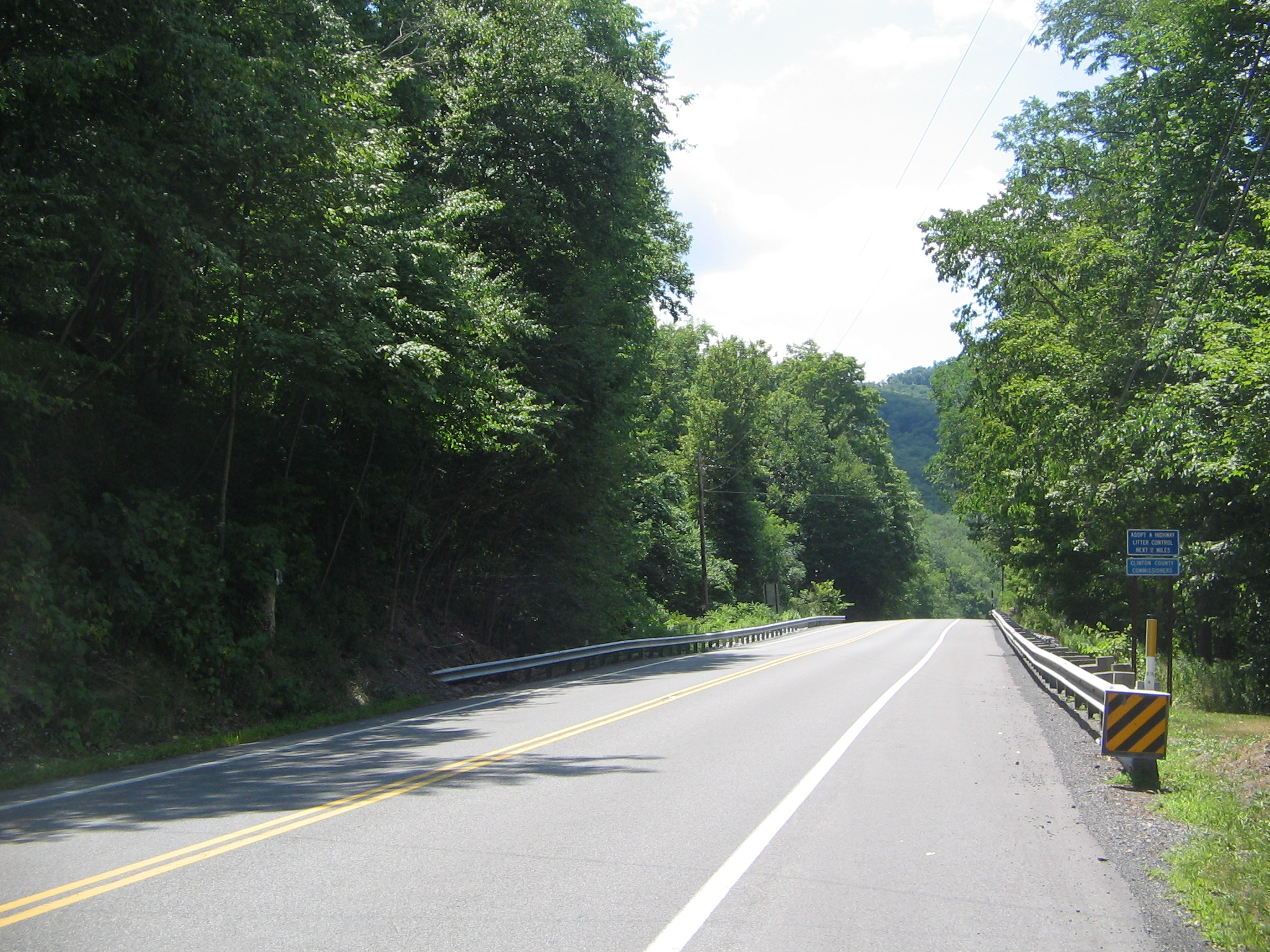
Pennsylvania Route 120 in Clinton County

Although the park covers 21,039 acres (8,514 ha), much of the land within the park boundaries is actually in private hands. The rest of the land in the valleys is owned by the Bureau of State Parks and the Bureau of Forestry as part of Elk State Forest and Sproul State Forest.

== Wildlife watching ==
Bucktail State Park Natural Area is in the West Branch and Sinnemahoning Valleys. River valleys are ideal gathering points for wildlife as the valleys tend to be warmer and wetter than the surrounding mountains. Animals are drawn to the warm and wet valley. The river valley is a natural passageway for plants and animals. The valley is home to river birch and sycamore trees. Osprey, a wide variety of duck, white-tailed deer, bald eagles, otter, merganser, mink and black bear can all be seen living in the boundaries of Bucktail State Park Natural Area.

Elk can be seen in the early morning and late afternoon hours in the northern portions of the park. Special elk viewing playforms have been built in Sinnemahoning State Park and near the small village of Bennezette.
