= Sizerville State Park =

State park near Emporium, Pennsylvania

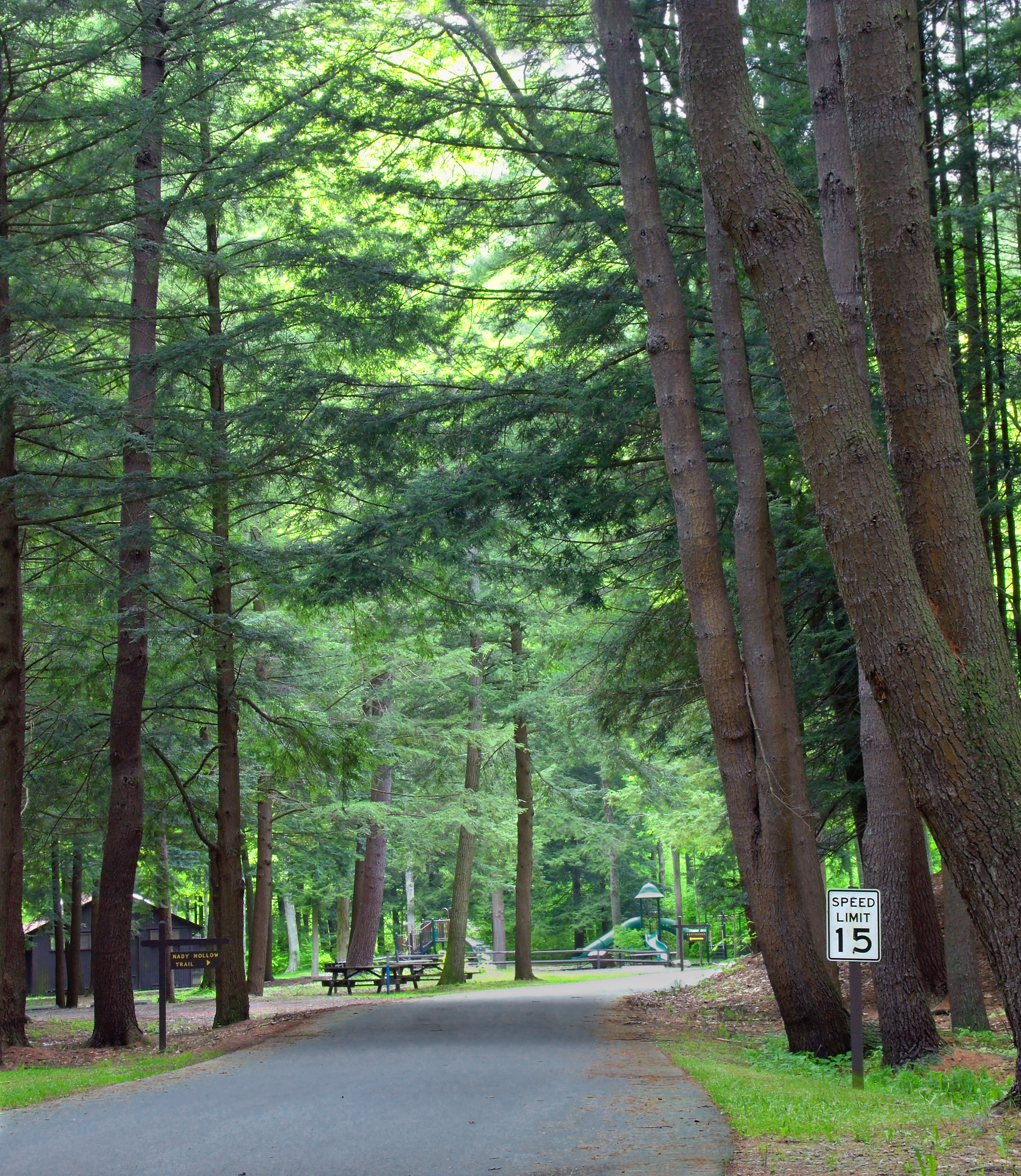

- Location within Pennsylvania Location within the United States
- Interactive map of Sizerville State Park
- Location: Cameron and Potter counties, Pennsylvania, United States
- Coordinates: 41°35′45″N 78°11′01″W
- Area: 386 acres (156 ha)
- Elevation: 1,627 feet (496 m)
- Established: 1924
- Administrator: Pennsylvania Department of Conservation and Natural Resources
- Website: Official website
- Pennsylvania State Parks

Sizerville State Park is a 386-acre (156 ha) Pennsylvania state park in Portage Township, Cameron County and Portage Township, Potter County, Pennsylvania in the United States. The park is nearly surrounded by Elk State Forest making it part of one of the largest blocks of state-owned land in Pennsylvania. Sizerville State Park is on Pennsylvania Route 155, six miles (10 km) north of the borough of Emporium.

== History ==
Sizerville State Park is named after the nearby ghost town of Sizerville, Pennsylvania, which was in turn named for the Sizer family, early settlers of the region. With the end of the logging boom of the late 19th century, the town was gradually abandoned. Sizerville State Park was first opened in 1924. The first park facilities were opened in 1927. The Civilian Conservation Corps led an effort to reforest the lands surrounding Sizerville State park during the Great Depression of the 1930s. Thousands of acres of old growth timber had been logged at the turn of the 20th century. The CCC planted thousands of acres of white pine and hemlock trees. Today these trees have reached maturity and make up most of the forested acres of Sizerville State Park.

== Recreation ==
Sizerville State Park features five different loop trails for hiking. Bottomlands, North Slope, and Campground are all on fairly flat land. Sizerville Nature Trail is a three-mile (5 km) loop that features several educational stopping points. It is also a trailhead for the Bucktail Path Trail. Nady Hollow Trail climbs a 1,900-foot (580 m) mountain.

Sizerville State Park has a 23-site campground. Eighteen of the sites have an electrical hook-up. The campground facilities include a sanitary dump, flush toilets and showers. Those interested in camping in tents can hike into five sites that are on the bank of a creek. The swimming pool is open to the public from Memorial Day until Labor Day.

There are six picnic pavilions and over 200 picnic tables on the grounds of Sizerville State Park. The picnic areas are shaded by the forest of white pine and hemlock. Many of the picnic areas are within walking distance of restrooms and playground facilities.

There are six creeks within Sizerville State Park that make for some ideal fishing. The east and west branches of Cowley Run are the home of brook and brown trout. Cowley Run offers some of the best fishing in the park. It contains a population of native brown trout and is stocked each spring by the Pennsylvania Fish and Boat Commission. Portage Creek and Driftwood Creek, branches of Sinnemahoning Creek, also contain trout and a population of smallmouth bass. Sinnemahoning Creek is another site for the fishing of bass and trout.

Hunting is permitted in 200 acres (81 ha) of Sizerville State Park. Hunters are expected to follow the rules and regulations of the Pennsylvania Game Commission. The common game species are ruffed grouse, squirrels, wild turkeys, white-tailed deer, and American black bears.

Snowmobiling and cross-country skiing take place in the winter months at Sizerville State Park. An average of 60–70 inches (152–178 cm) of snow falls on the park every winter. The park provides access to miles of groomed snowmobile and cross-country skiing trails in the nearby state forest lands.

== Environmental education ==
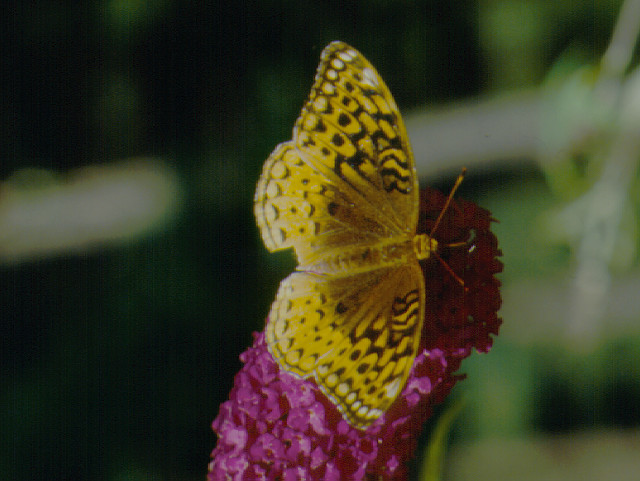
Great spangled fritillary butterfly at the park's butterfly garden

The Environmental Education Building houses exhibits and information about the plant and wildlife found in the park. Homeowners are taught how to plant around their homes to make them more attractive to creatures like butterflies and squirrels. Sizerville State Park provides environmental education programs to youth groups, schools, and teachers. Park rangers also lead guided tours of the park, providing hands on learning experiences.
