= Prospect Park, Cameron County, Pennsylvania =

Unincorporated community in Pennsylvania, US

- Census-designated place
- Location within Pennsylvania Location within the United States
- Coordinates: 41°31′01″N 78°12′56″W
- Country: United States
- State: Pennsylvania
- County: Cameron
- Township: Shippen

Area
  - Total: 0.61 sq mi (1.59 km^{2})
  - Land: 0.61 sq mi (1.58 km^{2})
  - Water: 0.0077 sq mi (0.02 km^{2})
- Elevation: 1,076 ft (328 m)

Population (2020)
  - Total: 270
  - Density: 443.4/sq mi (171.21/km^{2})
- Time zone: UTC-5 (Eastern (EST))
  - Summer (DST): UTC-4 (EDT)
- FIPS code: 42-62784
- GNIS feature ID: 2630034

Prospect Park is an unincorporated community and census-designated place in Shippen Township, Cameron County, Pennsylvania, United States. It is located along Pennsylvania Route 155 just east of the borough of Emporium. As of the 2010 census, the population in Prospect Park was 327 residents.

== Demographics ==
Historical population
Census	Pop.	Note	%±
2020	270		—
U.S. Decennial Census
