= Portage Township, Pennsylvania =

Portage Township is the name of some places in the U.S. state of Pennsylvania:

- Portage Township, Cambria County, Pennsylvania
- Portage Township, Cameron County, Pennsylvania
- Portage Township, Potter County, Pennsylvania
