= Shippen Township, Pennsylvania =

Shippen Township is the name of some places in the U.S. state of Pennsylvania:

- Shippen Township, Cameron County, Pennsylvania
- Shippen Township, Tioga County, Pennsylvania

See also:

- Shippensburg Township, Pennsylvania
