= Grove Township, Cameron County, Pennsylvania =

Township in Pennsylvania, United States

Coordinates: 41°25′00″N 77°59′58″W

Grove Township, Pennsylvania
- Township
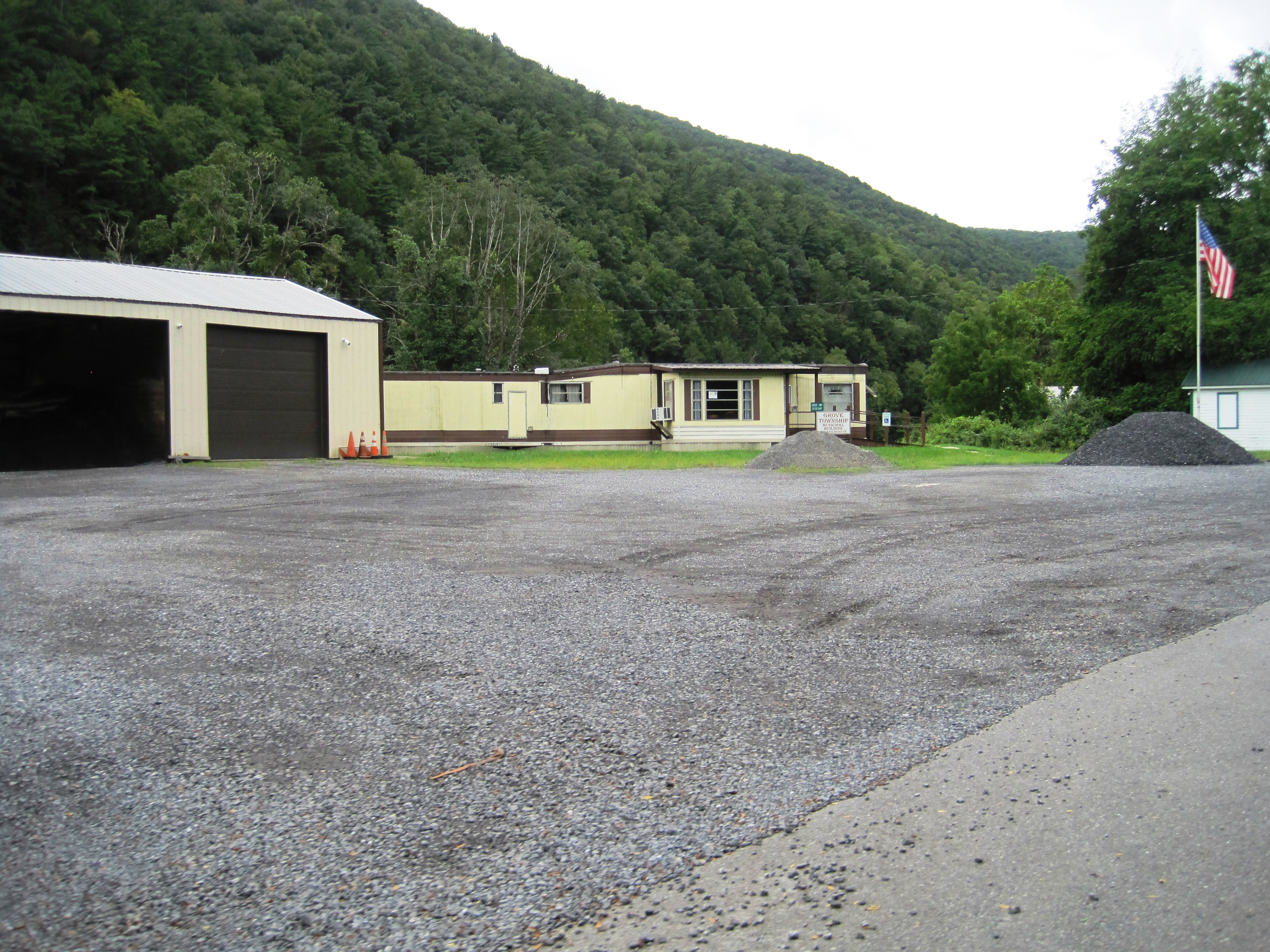
- Town Hall

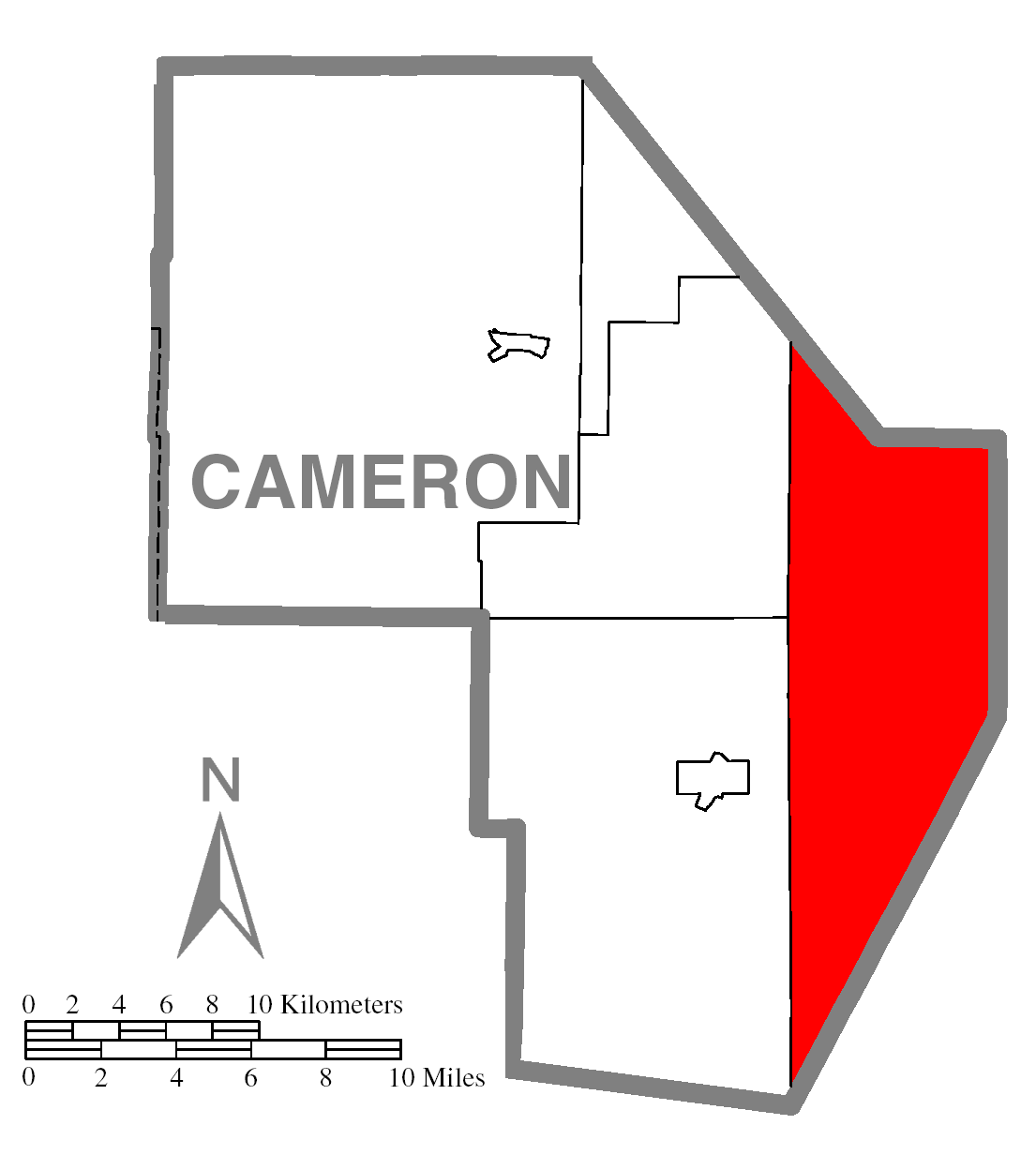
- Map of Cameron County, Pennsylvania highlighting Grove Township

- Map of Cameron County, Pennsylvania
- Country: United States
- State: Pennsylvania
- County: Cameron
- Settled: 1811

Area
  - Total: 73.93 sq mi (191.47 km^{2})
  - Land: 73.17 sq mi (189.50 km^{2})
  - Water: 0.76 sq mi (1.97 km^{2})

Population (2010)
  - Total: 183
  - Estimate (2018): 160
  - Density: 2.3/sq mi (0.89/km^{2})
- Time zone: UTC-5 (Eastern (EST))
  - Summer (DST): UTC-4 (EDT)
- Area code: 814
- FIPS code: 42-023-31632
- Website: https://grove-township.com/

Grove Township is a township in Cameron County, Pennsylvania, United States. The population was 183 at the 2010 census, up from 129 in 2000.

== Geography ==
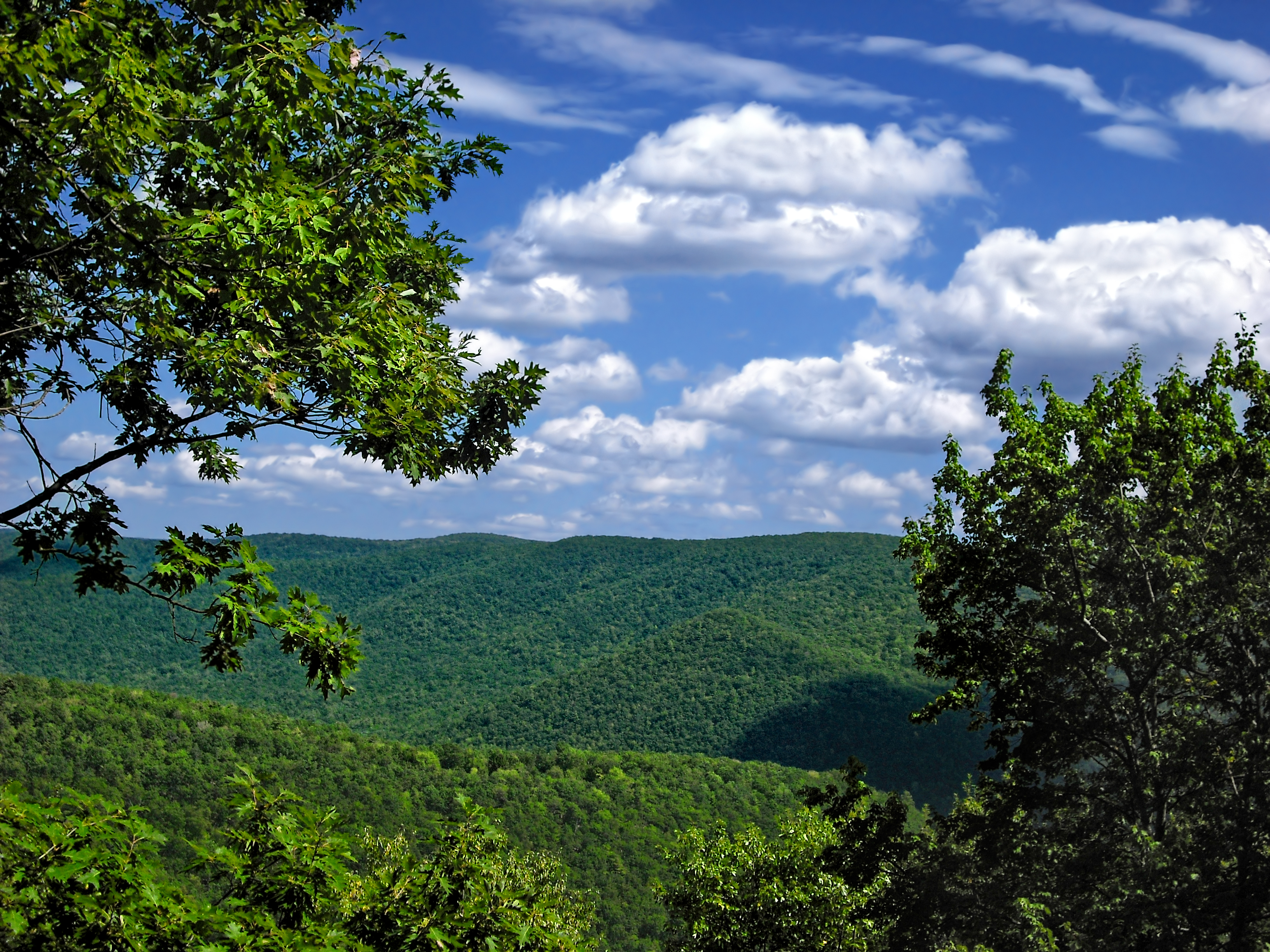
Sinnemahoning State Park

Grove Township is in eastern Cameron County and is bordered by Potter County to the northeast and north, Clinton County to the east and southeast, and Gibson and Lumber Townships to the west.

According to the United States Census Bureau, the township has a total area of 73.9 square miles (191.5 km^{2}), of which 73.2 square miles (189.5 km^{2}) is land and 0.77 square miles (2.0 km^{2}), or 1.03%, is water. The First Fork Sinnemahoning Creek flows north to south through the township, joining Sinnemahoning Creek near the southern end of the township. The creeks are part of the West Branch Susquehanna River watershed.

== Demographics ==
Historical population
Census	Pop.	Note	%±
2000	129		—
2010	183		41.9%
2018 (est.)	160		−12.6%
U.S. Decennial Census

As of the census of 2000, there were 129 people, 57 households, and 40 families residing in the township. The population density was 1.8 people per square mile (0.7/km^{2}). There were 749 housing units at an average density of 10.2/sq mi (3.9/km^{2}). The racial makeup of the township was 100.00% White.

There were 57 households, out of which 17.5% had children under the age of 18 living with them, 61.4% were married couples living together, 7.0% had a female householder with no husband present, and 28.1% were non-families. 22.8% of all households were made up of individuals, and 7.0% had someone living alone who was 65 years of age or older. The average household size was 2.26 and the average family size was 2.54.

In the township the population was spread out, with 16.3% under the age of 18, 7.0% from 18 to 24, 19.4% from 25 to 44, 33.3% from 45 to 64, and 24.0% who were 65 years of age or older. The median age was 52 years. For every 100 females, there were 104.8 males. For every 100 females age 18 and over, there were 107.7 males.

The median income for a household in the township was $33,750, and the median income for a family was $38,000. Males had a median income of $22,500 versus $33,750 for females. The per capita income for the township was $15,650. There were 3.7% of families and 6.3% of the population living below the poverty line, including 12.5% of under eighteens and none of those over 64.
