= Gibson Township, Pennsylvania =

Gibson Township is the name of some places in the U.S. state of Pennsylvania:

- Gibson Township, Cameron County, Pennsylvania
- Gibson Township, Susquehanna County, Pennsylvania
