= Lumber Township, Pennsylvania =

Township in Pennsylvania, United States

Coordinates: 41°31′00″N 78°07′59″W

- Township
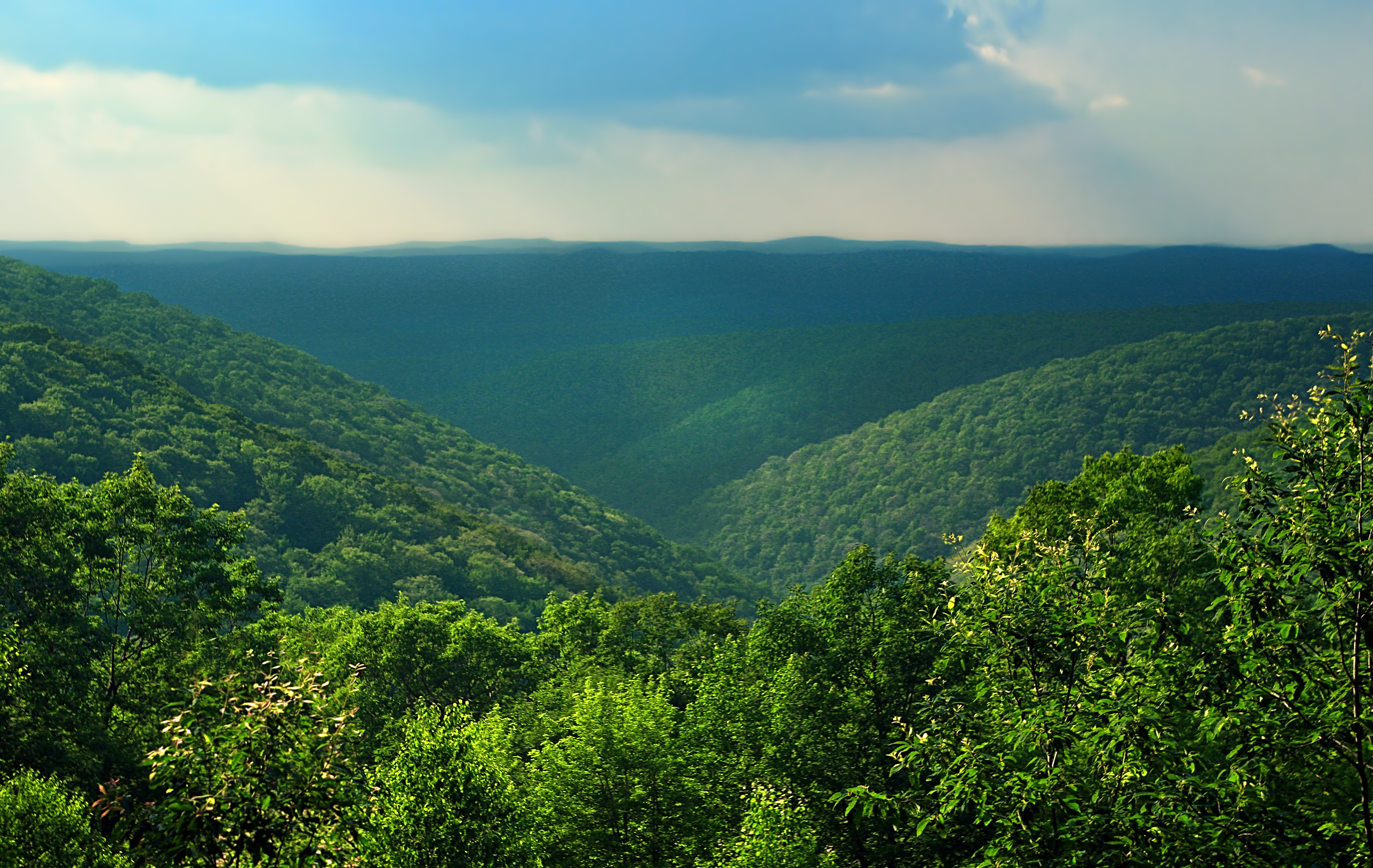
- Whitehead Vista in Elk State Forest

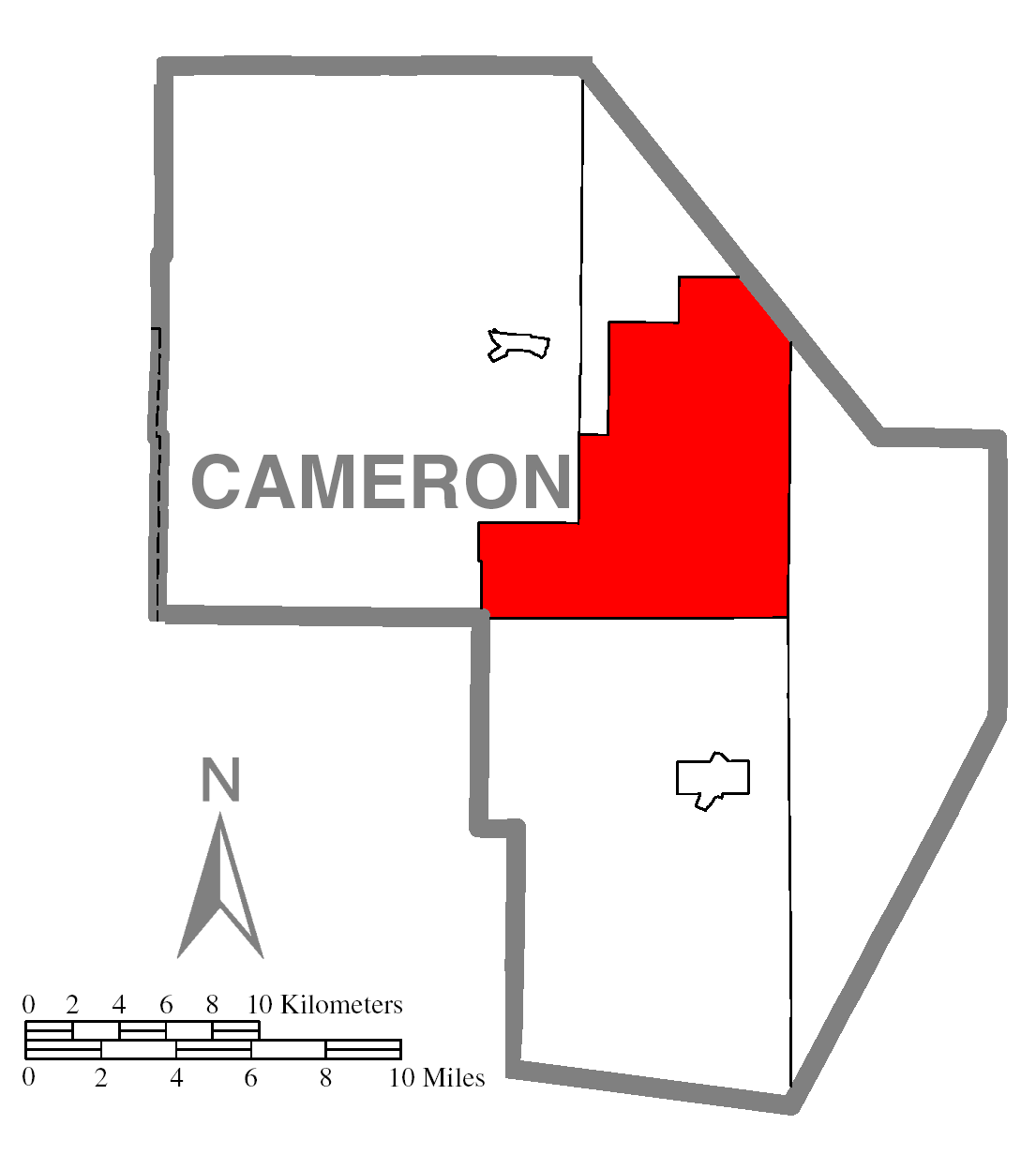
- Map of Cameron County, Pennsylvania highlighting Lumber Township

- Map of Cameron County, Pennsylvania
- Country: United States
- State: Pennsylvania
- County: Cameron
- Settled: 1810

Area
  - Total: 55.15 sq mi (142.85 km^{2})
  - Land: 54.94 sq mi (142.30 km^{2})
  - Water: 0.21 sq mi (0.55 km^{2})

Population (2020)
  - Total: 178 ▼
  - Estimate (2021): 174
  - Density: 3.3/sq mi (1.26/km^{2})
- Time zone: UTC-5 (Eastern (EST))
  - Summer (DST): UTC-4 (EDT)
- Area code: 814
- FIPS code: 42-023-45432

Lumber Township is a township in Cameron County, Pennsylvania, United States. The population was 178 at the 2020 census, down from 195 in 2010.

== Geography ==
Lumber Township is located near the center of Cameron County and is bordered by Portage Township to the north and west, Potter County to the northeast, Grove Township to the east, Gibson Township to the south and Shippen Township to the west and north.

According to the United States Census Bureau, the township has a total area of 55.1 square miles (142.8 km^{2}), of which 54.9 square miles (142.3 km^{2}) is land and 0.19 square miles (0.5 km^{2}), or 0.38%, is water. The Driftwood Branch Sinnemahoning Creek, part of the West Branch Susquehanna River watershed, flows from north to south through the southwestern part of the township.

== Demographics ==
Historical population
| Census | Pop. | Note | %± |
|---|---|---|---|
| 2000 | 241 | | — |
| 2010 | 195 | | −19.1% |
| 2020 | 178 | | −8.7% |
| 2021 (est.) | 174 | | −2.2% |
U.S. Decennial Census

As of the census of 2000, there were 241 people, 96 households, and 71 families residing in the township. The population density was 4.7 people per square mile (1.8/km^{2}). There were 368 housing units at an average density of 7.2/sq mi (2.8/km^{2}). The racial makeup of the township was 97.93% White, 0.41% Native American, and 1.66% from two or more races.

There were 96 households, out of which 30.2% had children under the age of 18 living with them, 62.5% were married couples living together, 7.3% had a female householder with no husband present, and 26.0% were non-families. 22.9% of all households were made up of individuals, and 13.5% had someone living alone who was 65 years of age or older. The average household size was 2.51 and the average family size was 2.93.

In the township the population was spread out, with 25.7% under the age of 18, 3.7% from 18 to 24, 21.2% from 25 to 44, 31.1% from 45 to 64, and 18.3% who were 65 years of age or older. The median age was 44 years. For every 100 females, there were 92.8 males. For every 100 females age 18 and over, there were 96.7 males.

The median income for a household in the township was $23,750, and the median income for a family was $32,500. Males had a median income of $44,375 versus $21,042 for females. The per capita income for the township was $15,556. About 3.3% of families and 7.7% of the population were below the poverty line, including 11.1% of those under the age of 18 and none of those 65 or over.
