= Portage Township, Cameron County, Pennsylvania =

Township in Pennsylvania, United States

Coordinates: 41°29′00″N 78°11′59″W

- Township
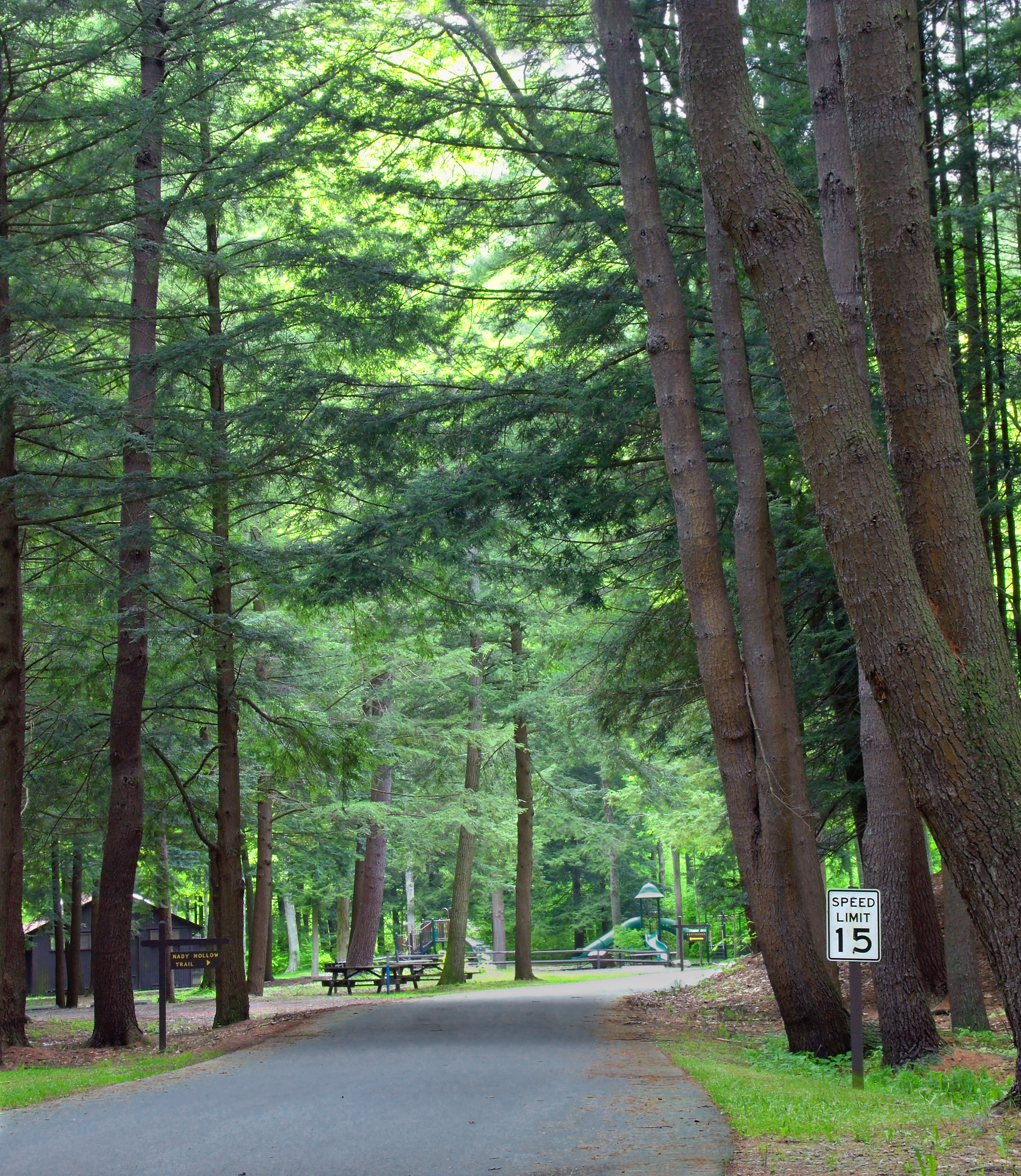
- Road through conifers in Sizerville State Park

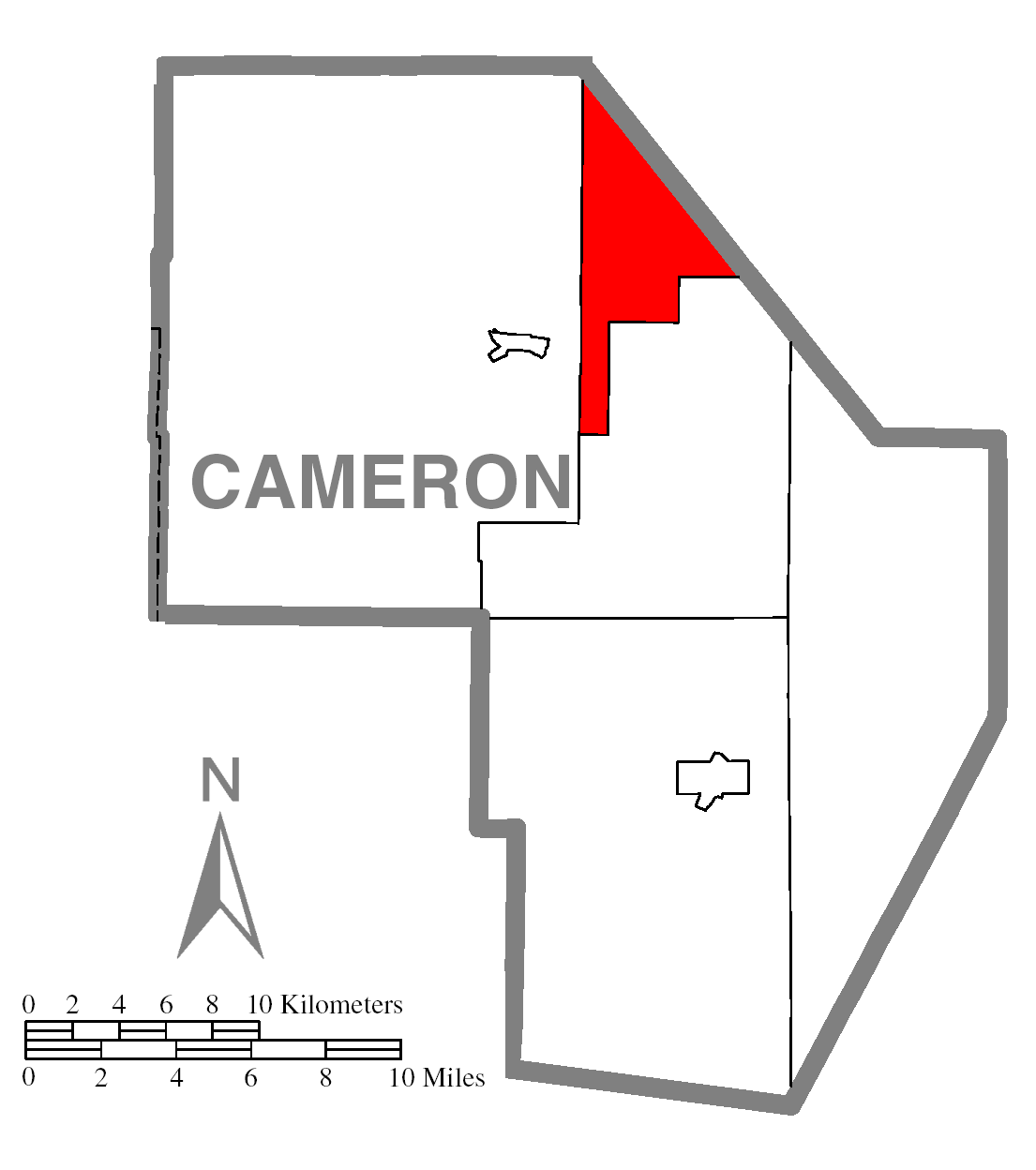
- Map of Cameron County, Pennsylvania highlighting Portage Township

- Map of Cameron County, Pennsylvania
- Country: United States
- State: Pennsylvania
- County: Cameron
- Settled: 1820

Area
  - Total: 14.47 sq mi (37.47 km^{2})
  - Land: 14.37 sq mi (37.21 km^{2})
  - Water: 0.10 sq mi (0.26 km^{2})

Population (2020)
  - Total: 163 ▼
  - Estimate (2021): 160
  - Density: 11/sq mi (4.3/km^{2})
- Time zone: UTC-5 (Eastern (EST))
  - Summer (DST): UTC-4 (EDT)
- Area code: 814
- FIPS code: 42-023-62064

Portage Township is a township in Cameron County, Pennsylvania, United States. The population was 163 at the 2020 census, down from 171 in 2010.

== Geography ==
Portage Township is located in northeastern Cameron County and has a narrow, north–south-oriented shape. It is bordered by Potter County to the northeast, Lumber Township to the south and east and Shippen Township to the west. The borough of Emporium, the Cameron County seat, is 2 miles (3 km) to the west. The hamlet of Sizerville is in the northern part of the township, next to Sizerville State Park.

According to the United States Census Bureau, the township has a total area of 14.5 square miles (37.5 km^{2}), of which 14.4 square miles (37.2 km^{2}) is land and 0.1 square miles (0.3 km^{2}), or 0.69%, is water. Sinnemahoning Portage Creek, flowing north to south, runs through the northern portion of the township. The creek is part of the Sinnemahoning Creek watershed, which connects to the West Branch Susquehanna River. The headwaters of the creek, to the north in Potter County, rise a short distance south of Allegheny Portage Creek, a north-flowing stream that is part of the Allegheny River system flowing to the Ohio Valley.

== Demographics ==
Historical population
Census	Pop.	Note	%±
2000	258		—
2010	171		−33.7%
2020	163		−4.7%
2021 (est.)	160		−1.8%
U.S. Decennial Census

As of the census of 2000, there were 258 people, 96 households, and 71 families residing in the township. The population density was 14.2 people per square mile (5.5/km^{2}). There were 136 housing units at an average density of 7.5/sq mi (2.9/km^{2}). The racial makeup of the township was 98.84% White, 0.39% African American, 0.39% Native American and 0.39% Asian. Hispanic or Latino of any race were 0.39% of the population.

There were 96 households, out of which 36.5% had children under the age of 18 living with them, 59.4% were married couples living together, 9.4% had a female householder with no husband present, and 26.0% were non-families. 24.0% of all households were made up of individuals, and 10.4% had someone living alone who was 65 years of age or older. The average household size was 2.69 and the average family size was 3.18.

In the township the population was spread out, with 29.1% under the age of 18, 6.6% from 18 to 24, 29.8% from 25 to 44, 19.4% from 45 to 64, and 15.1% who were 65 years of age or older. The median age was 34 years. For every 100 females there were 95.5 males. For every 100 females age 18 and over, there were 94.7 males.

The median income for a household in the township was $34,125, and the median income for a family was $39,750. Males had a median income of $32,361 versus $26,161 for females. The per capita income for the township was $15,001. None of the families and 3.2% of the population were living below the poverty line, including no under eighteens and 10.3% of those over 64.
