= Gibson Township, Cameron County, Pennsylvania =

Township in Pennsylvania, United States

Coordinates: 41°22′00″N 78°06′59″W

- Township
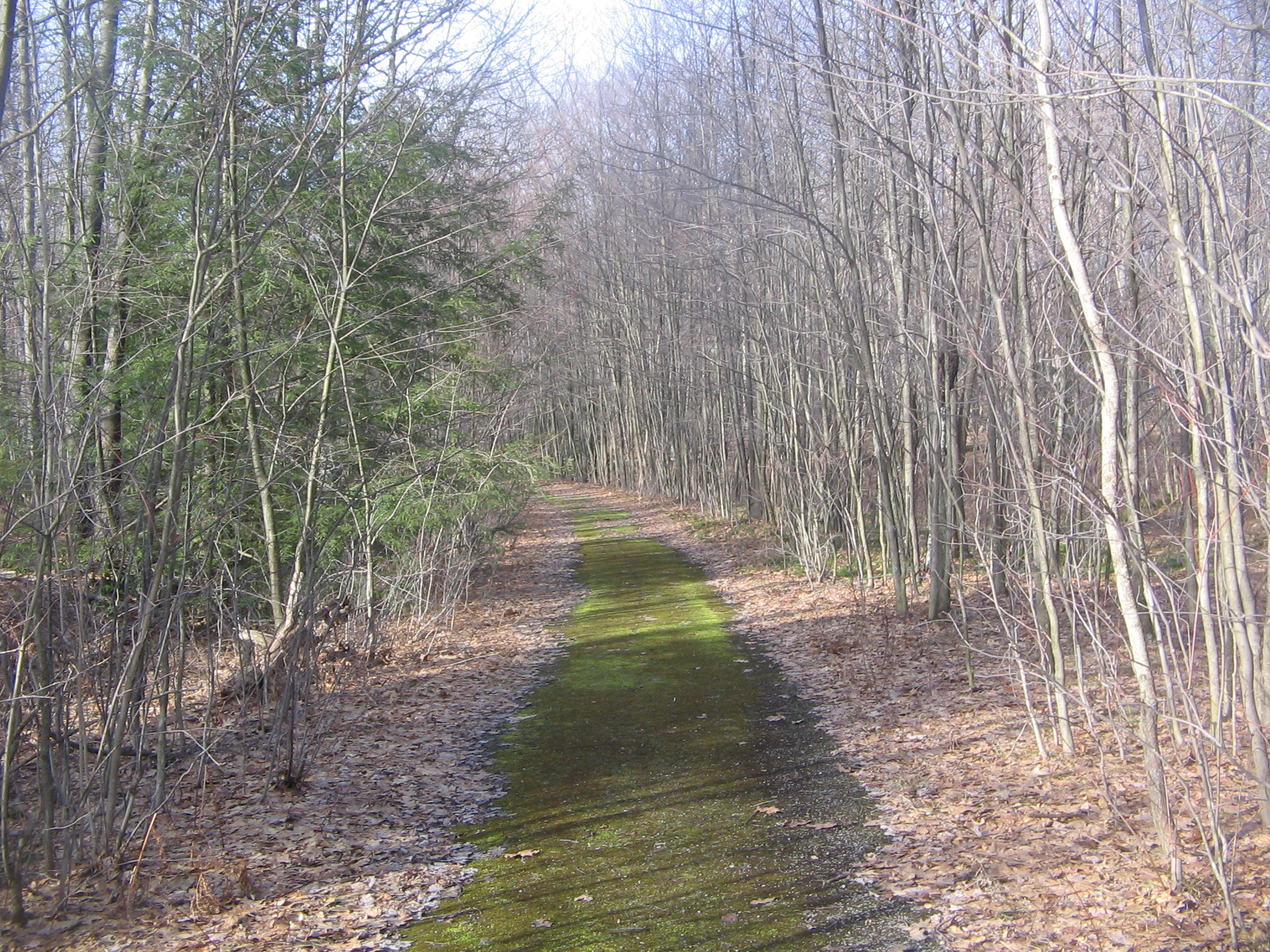
- An old road in the Quehanna Wild Area

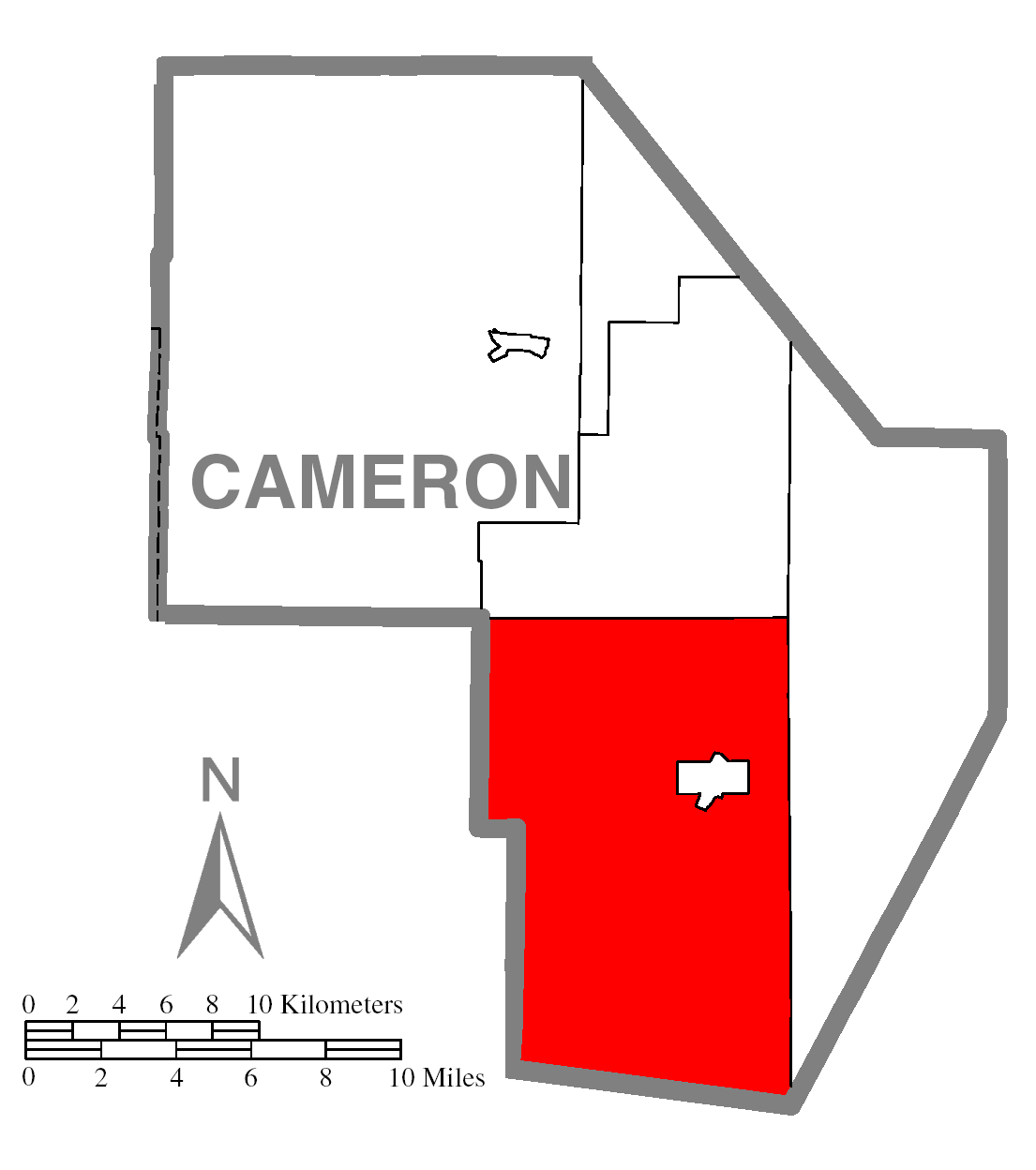
- Map of Cameron County, Pennsylvania highlighting Gibson Township

- Map of Cameron County, Pennsylvania
- Country: United States
- State: Pennsylvania
- County: Cameron
- Settled: 1804

Area
  - Total: 94.57 sq mi (244.93 km^{2})
  - Land: 93.93 sq mi (243.29 km^{2})
  - Water: 0.63 sq mi (1.64 km^{2})

Population (2020)
  - Total: 178
  - Estimate (2021): 174
  - Density: 1.6/sq mi (0.62/km^{2})
- Time zone: UTC-5 (Eastern (EST))
  - Summer (DST): UTC-4 (EDT)
- Area code: 814
- FIPS code: 42-023-29008
- Website: https://gibsontwp.com/

Gibson Township is a township in Cameron County, Pennsylvania, United States. The population was 178 at the 2020 census, up from 164 in 2010, which in turn was a decline from the figure of 222 in 2000.

== Geography ==
Gibson Township is in southern Cameron County and is bordered by Lumber Township to the north, Grove Township to the east, Clearfield County to the south and Elk County to the west. The township surrounds the borough of Driftwood but is separate from it.

According to the United States Census Bureau, the township has a total area of 94.6 square miles (244.9 km^{2}), of which 93.9 square miles (243.3 km^{2}) is land and 0.62 square miles (1.6 km^{2}), or 0.67%, is water. The Driftwood Branch and Bennett Branch of Sinnemahoning Creek flow through the township, joining at Driftwood to form Sinnemahoning Creek, which continues east across the township on its way towards the West Branch Susquehanna River.

== Demographics ==
Historical population
Census	Pop.	Note	%±
2000	222		—
2010	164		−26.1%
2020	178		8.5%
2021 (est.)	174		−2.2%
U.S. Decennial Census

As of the census of 2000, there were 222 people, 89 households, and 60 families residing in the township. The population density was 2.3 people per square mile (0.9/km^{2}). There were 578 housing units at an average density of 6.1/sq mi (2.4/km^{2}). The racial makeup of the township was 96.40% White, 1.35% Native American, 0.45% Asian, and 1.80% from two or more races. Hispanic or Latino of any race were 1.80% of the population.

There were 89 households, out of which 25.8% had children under the age of 18 living with them, 65.2% were married couples living together, 2.2% had a female householder with no husband present, and 31.5% were non-families. 29.2% of all households were made up of individuals, and 14.6% had someone living alone who was 65 years of age or older. The average household size was 2.49 and the average family size was 3.10.

In the township the population was spread out, with 25.7% under the age of 18, 4.5% from 18 to 24, 24.3% from 25 to 44, 25.2% from 45 to 64, and 20.3% who were 65 years of age or older. The median age was 43 years. For every 100 females, there were 107.5 males. For every 100 females age 18 and over, there were 108.9 males.

The median income for a household in the township was $27,917, and the median income for a family was $36,667. Males had a median income of $31,250 versus $14,167 for females. The per capita income for the township was $11,888. About 5.0% of families and 4.2% of the population were below the poverty line, including none of those under the age of eighteen or sixty five or over.

== Notable person ==
- Actor Tom Mix was born in Mix Run, in Gibson Township.
