= First Fork Sinnemahoning Creek =

River in Pennsylvania

Coordinates: 41°19′03″N 78°04′48″W

First Fork Sinnemahoning Creek is a tributary of Sinnemahoning Creek in the U.S. state of Pennsylvania.

== Course and tributaries ==
The First Fork Sinnemahoning Creek rises south of Coudersport and flows 33.4 miles (53.8 km) south, joining Sinnemahoning Creek at Jericho. Freeman Run joins the First Fork at the community of Costello, Potter County. The East Fork joins 5.6 miles (9.0 km) downstream at the community of Wharton, Potter County. (The former municipality of East Fork, dissolved in 2004, took its name from this tributary.)

The First Fork continues for 11.8 miles (19.0 km) to the George B. Stevenson Dam in Sinnemahoning State Park. The dam creates the George B. Stevenson Reservoir, a 142-acre (57 ha) lake constructed by the Commonwealth of Pennsylvania in 1955 as part of the flood control project on the West Branch Susquehanna River. It is one of four such dams in the river basin. The other reservoirs are at Kettle Creek State Park, Curwensville and Bald Eagle State Park. These four reservoirs and dams control a total of 1,163 square miles (3,010 km^{2}) of drainage area and provide flood prevention for the cities and towns downstream.

The reservoir is open to some recreational boating, fishing and ice fishing. Gas-powered motors are prohibited; motorized boats must be powered by electric motors only. Sailboats, rowboats, canoes, kayaks, and paddleboats are permitted on the waters of the lake. All boats must be properly registered with any state. The reservoir is open to ice fishing during the winter months when the lake is frozen. The First Fork continues for 8.2 miles (13.2 km) to join Sinnemahoning Creek at the community of Sinnemahoning, Cameron County.

== See also ==
- List of rivers of Pennsylvania
