= East Keating Township, Pennsylvania =

Former township in Pennsylvania, US

Coordinates: 41°17′30″N 78°01′29″W

- Former Township
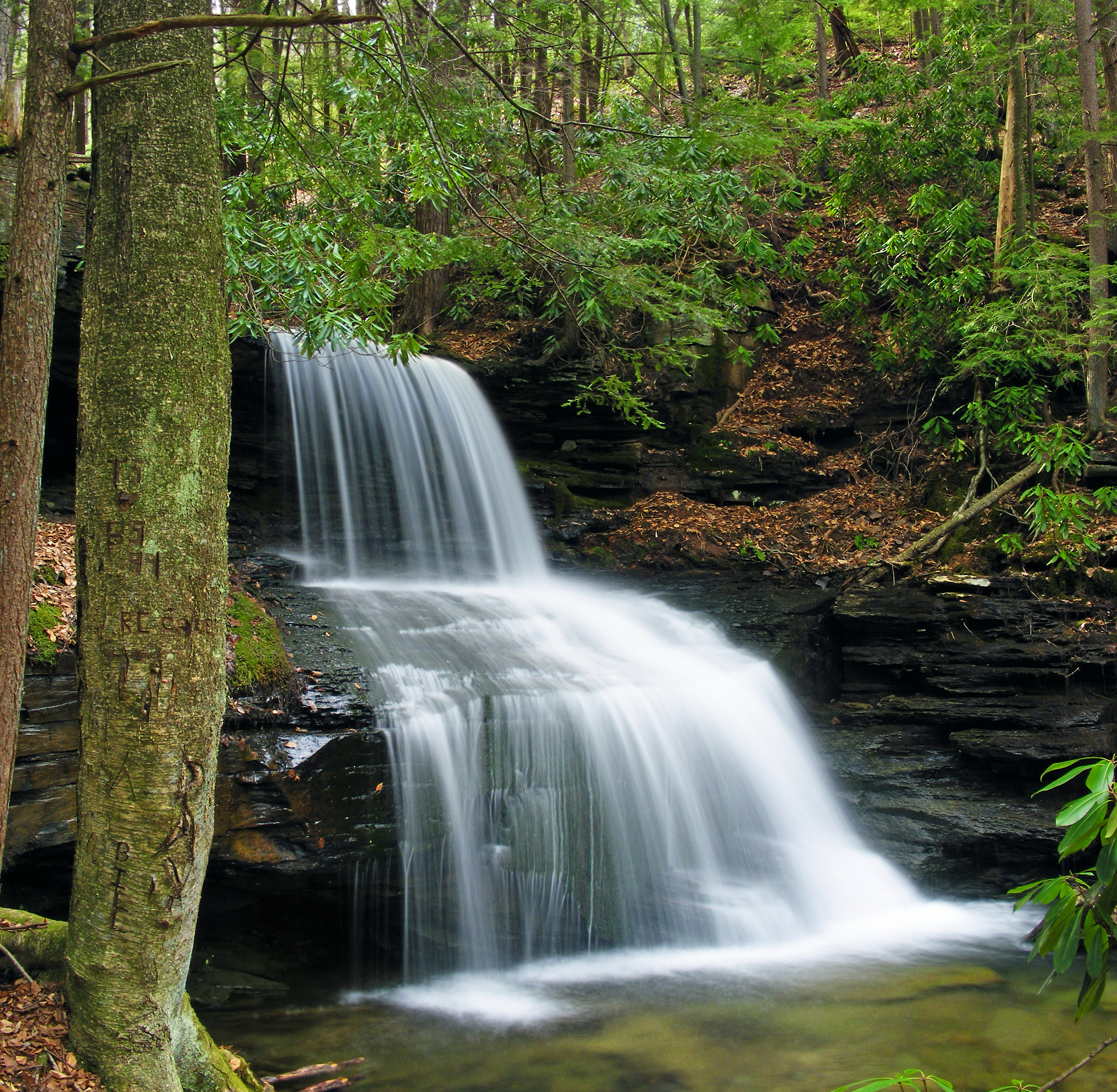
- Round Island Run Falls within Sproul State Forest

- Location in Clinton County and the state of Pennsylvania.
- Country: United States
- State: Pennsylvania
- County: Clinton
- Settled: 1805
- Incorporated: 1875

Area
  - Total: 51.38 sq mi (133.08 km^{2})
  - Land: 50.66 sq mi (131.22 km^{2})
  - Water: 0.72 sq mi (1.86 km^{2})

Population (2020)
  - Total: 9 ▼
  - Estimate (2021): 9
  - Density: 0.21/sq mi (0.08/km^{2})
- FIPS code: 42-035-21328

East Keating Township was a township in Clinton County, Pennsylvania until January 1, 2025, when it was absorbed into Noyes Township. The population was 9 at the 2020 census, the second smallest municipality in terms of population in Pennsylvania behind Centralia.

== Geography ==
According to the United States Census Bureau, the township had a total area of 51.4 square miles (133.1 km^{2}), of which 50.6 square miles (131.1 km^{2}) was land and 0.73 square miles (1.9 km^{2}), or 1.40%, was water.

== Demographics ==
Historical population
Census	Pop.	Note	%±
1980	33		—
1990	22		−33.3%
2000	24		9.1%
2010	11		−54.2%
2020	9		−18.2%
2021 (est.)	9		0.0%

As of the census of 2000, there were 24 people, 13 households, and 7 families residing in the township. The population density was 0.5 people per square mile (0.2/km^{2}). There were 145 housing units at an average density of 2.9/sq mi (1.1/km^{2}). The racial makeup of the township was 100.00% White.

There were 13 households, out of which 7.7% had children under the age of 18 living with them, 61.5% were married couples living together, and 38.5% were non-families. 38.5% of all households were made up of individuals, and 15.4% had someone living alone who was 65 years of age or older. The average household size was 1.85 and the average family size was 2.38.

In the township the population was spread out, with 4.2% under the age of 18, 4.2% from 18 to 24, 8.3% from 25 to 44, 62.5% from 45 to 64, and 20.8% who were 65 years of age or older. The median age was 54 years. For every 100 females, there were 166.7 males. For every 100 females age 18 and over, there were 187.5 males.

The median income for a household in the township was $24,375, and the median income for a family was $24,375. Males had a median income of $48,750 versus $0 for females. The per capita income for the township was $13,047. None of the population and none of the families were below the poverty line.
