= Sinnemahoning State Park =

State park in Cameron and Potter counties, Pennsylvania

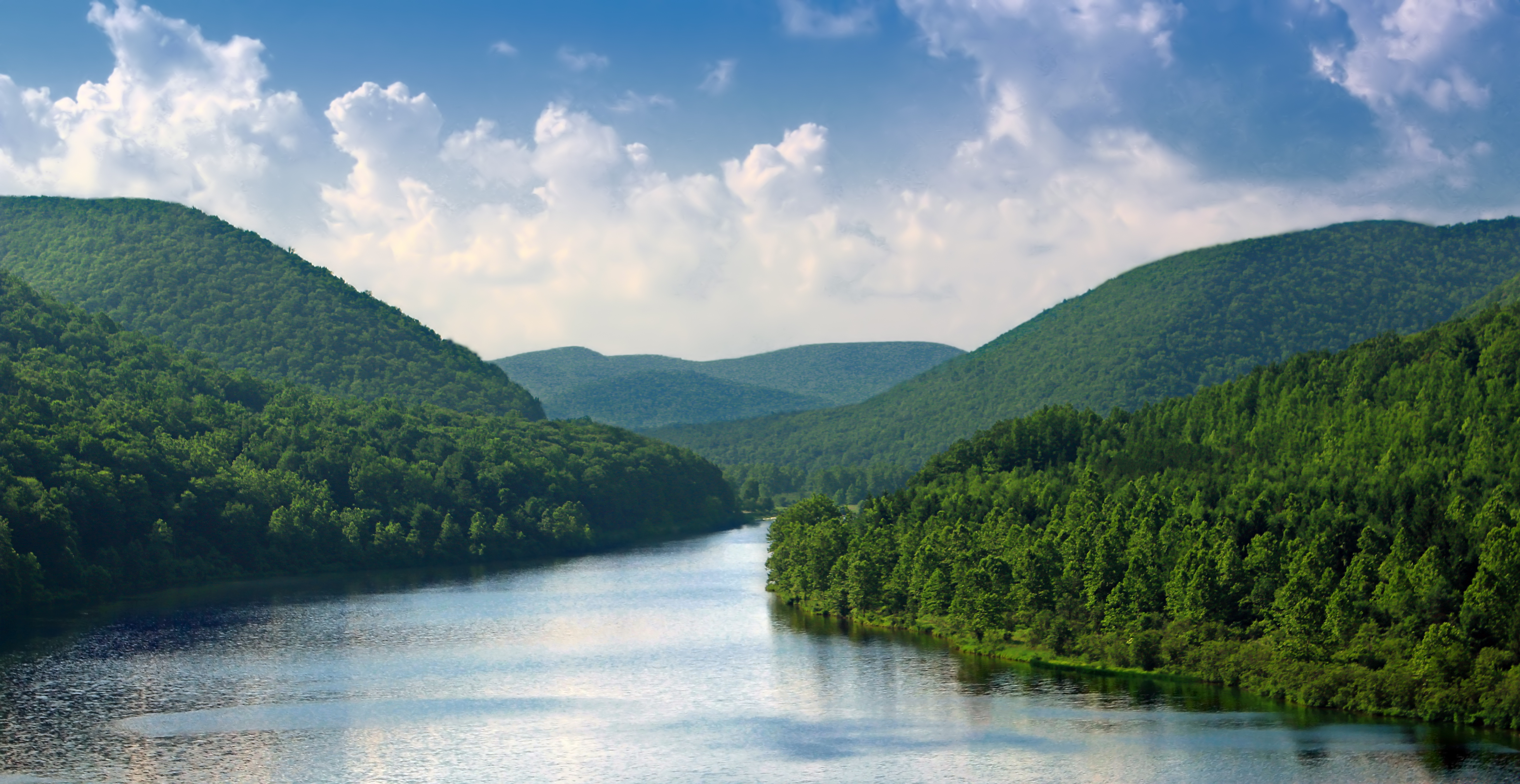
- Sinnemahoning Creek

- Location within Pennsylvania Location within the United States
- Interactive map of Sinnemahoning State Park
- Location: Cameron and Potter counties, Pennsylvania, United States
- Coordinates: 41°28′24″N 78°03′24″W
- Area: 1,910 acres (770 ha)
- Elevation: 961 feet (293 m)
- Established: 1962
- Administrator: Pennsylvania Department of Conservation and Natural Resources
- Website: Official website
- Pennsylvania State Parks

Sinnemahoning State Park is a 1,910-acre (773 ha) Pennsylvania state park in Grove Township, Cameron County and Wharton Township, Potter County, Pennsylvania, in the United States. The park is surrounded by Elk State Forest and is mountainous with deep valleys. The park is home to the rarely seen elk and bald eagle. Sinnemahoning State Park is on Pennsylvania Route 872, eight miles (13 km) north of the village of Sinnamahoning. In 1958, the park opened under the direction of the Pennsylvania Bureau of Forestry: it became a Pennsylvania State Park in 1962.

== History ==
=== Native Americans ===
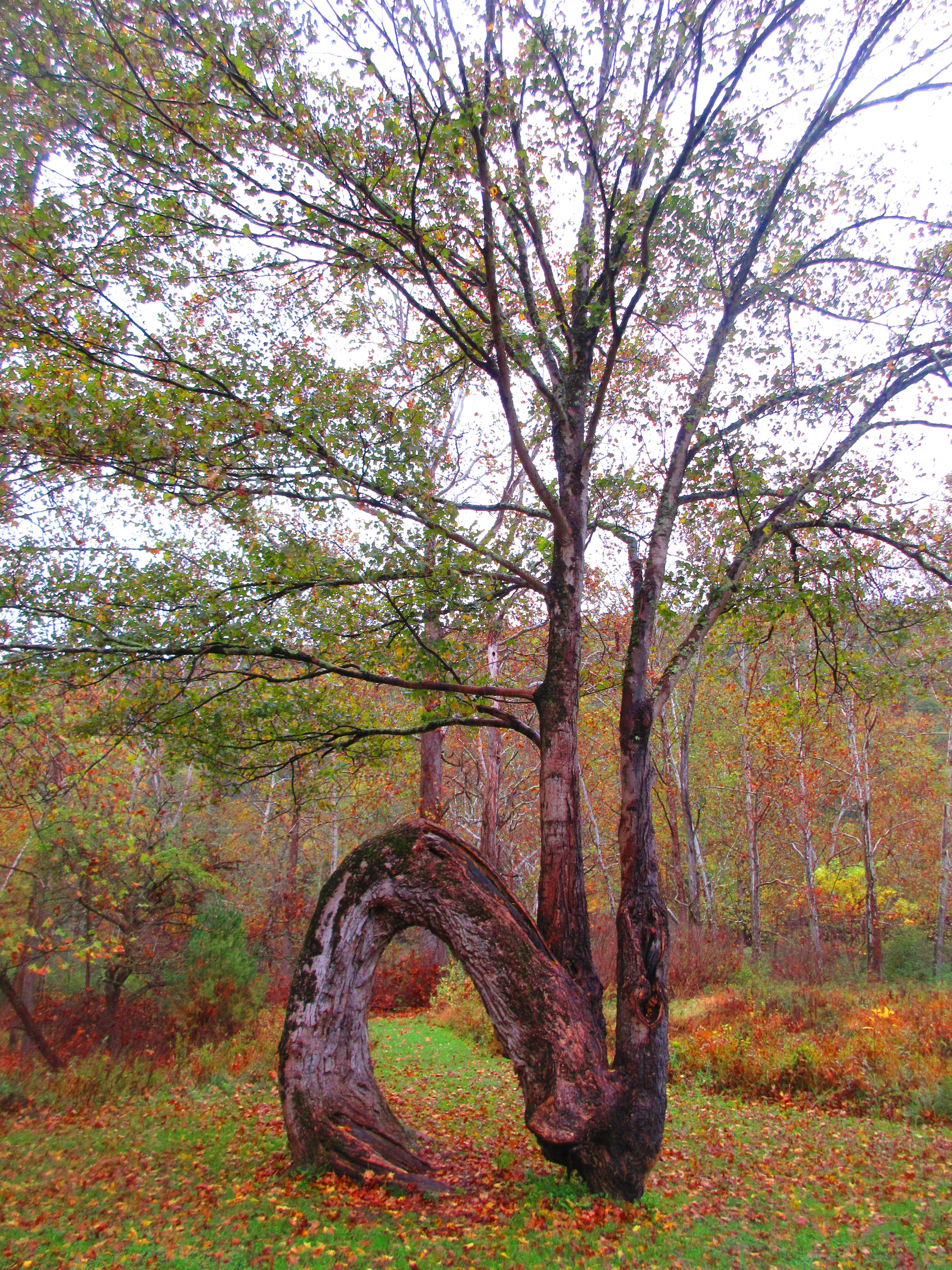
This unique arch tree, which is believed to be a Native American trail tree, is a popular spot for park visitors.

Native Americans began living in the Sinnemahoning State Park area 10,000 to 12,000 years ago. They followed the receding glaciers and found that the area supported a bountiful supply of fish, wildlife, berries and nuts. Archaeologists have found evidence of their presence in the bottomlands of the creeks. The word Sinnemahoning is derived from an American Indian word that means "Rocky Lick". A natural salt lick is said to have been near the mouth of Grove Run.

=== Lumber era ===
The native population of Pennsylvania was forced out by disease and the American Revolutionary War. The Sinnemahoning area was left largely unsettled and wild until the late 19th century when the logging boom that spread throughout the mountains of Pennsylvania arrived. Lumbermen cleared vast stands of old-growth forest. The logs were floated down Sinnemahoning Creek and its tributaries to the West Branch Susquehanna River and to the Susquehanna Boom at Williamsport. The only thing the lumbermen left behind was the treetops. These tree tops were left to dry. The passing steam locomotives on the railroads would ignite this dry brush causing massive wildfires that swept through the mountains and valleys. The Sinnemahoning Creek area was left to waste. The forests struggled to regrow in the wake of the wildfire. The hills began to erode. The streams were dying and wildlife was scarcely found.

=== George B. Stevenson Reservoir ===
George B. Stevenson Reservoir is a 142-acre (57 ha) manmade lake that was engineered by Gannett Fleming Corddry & Carpenter, Inc. and constructed by the Commonwealth of Pennsylvania in 1955 as part of the flood control project on the West Branch Susquehanna River. It is one of four such dams in the river basin. The other reservoirs are at Kettle Creek State Park, Curwensville and Bald Eagle State Park. These four reservoirs and dams control a total of 1,163 square miles (3,010 km^{2}) of drainage area and provides flood prevention for the cities and towns downstream. The reservoir is named after the former State Senator of the same name, who while during his tenure as Mayor of Lock Haven, experienced the 1936 flood; subsequently, he remained dedicated to flood control during the rest of his political career.

== Recreation ==
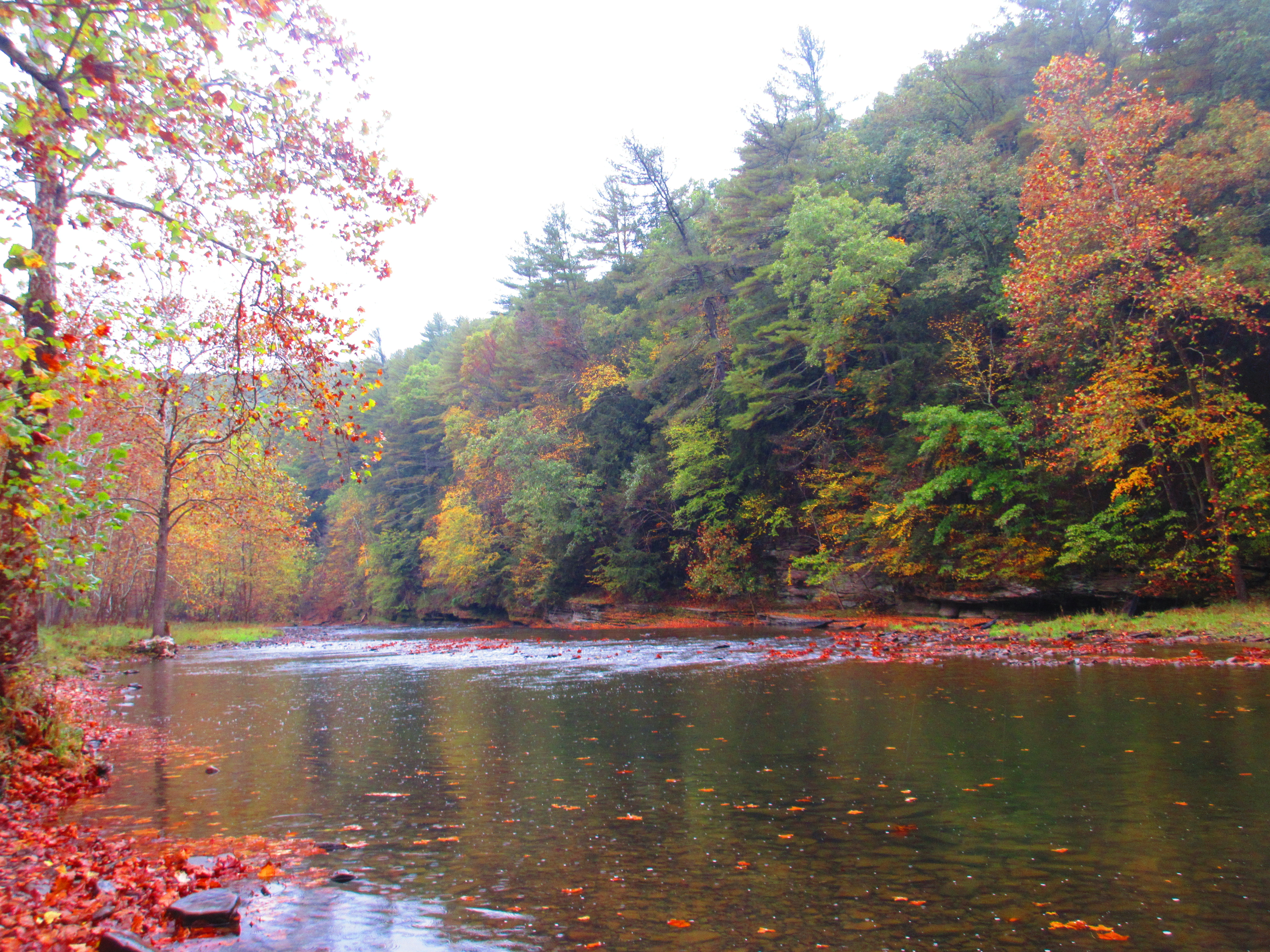
The creek below the reservoir is known for its colorful fall foliage displays.

The reservoir is open to some recreational boating, fishing and ice fishing. Gas powered motors are prohibited on George B. Stevenson Reservoir. Motorized boats must be powered by electric motors only. Sailboats, rowboats, canoes, kayaks, and paddleboats are permitted on the waters of the lake. All boats must be properly registered with any state. Common game fish at the park, in the lake and streams, are brook, rainbow and brown trout, catfish, crappie, tiger muskellunge, smallmouth and largemouth bass, sunfish, bluegill, perch and pickerel. There is a native population of brook trout in some of the small streams of Sinnemahoning State Park. The reservoir is open to ice fishing during the winter months when the lake is frozen.

=== Hunting ===
There are 1,400 acres (567 ha) of woods open to hunting. Hunters are expected to follow the rules and regulations of the Pennsylvania Game Commission. The common game species are black bears, eastern gray squirrels, ruffed grouse, waterfowl, white-tailed deer, and turkeys. The hunting of groundhogs is prohibited. Hunters also use the park to gain access to Elk State Forest.

=== Trails ===
The trails of Sinnemahoning State Park are open to hiking, cross-country skiing and snowmobiling.

- Red Spruce Trail is about one mile (1.6 km) long and goes from the camping area to the Forty Maples Picnic Area. It passes through a spruce plantation and a mixed hardwood forest. Hikers should be cautious of the venomous snakes that live in the area.
- Low Lands Trail is a level trail that follows a railbed that was part of the Philadelphia and Erie Railroad. It passes vernal pools, thick stands of spruce trees, and creek beds. The Low Lands Trail ends at the Wildlife Viewing area. Hikers on the trail may get the chance to see osprey, butterflies, elk, and grassland birds.

=== Camping and picnicking ===
The modern campground has 35 sites with a washhouse that is equipped with showers and flush toilets. The camp sites can accommodate tents, campers and RVs. Each site has a picnic table and a fire ring. The Brooks Run Ranger cabin is a two-story house available for rent. It sleeps up to twelve people with four bedrooms, a living room, kitchen and a fireplace. Sinnemahoning State Park has three picnic area.

=== Wildlife Center ===
The park's visitor center and office opened in 2011 in the northern section of the park. Known as the Wildlife Center at Sinnemahoning, the building features interpretive exhibits and opportunities to view wildlife.
