= Shippen Township, Cameron County, Pennsylvania =

Township in Pennsylvania, United States

Coordinates: 41°32′30″N 78°14′29″W

- Township
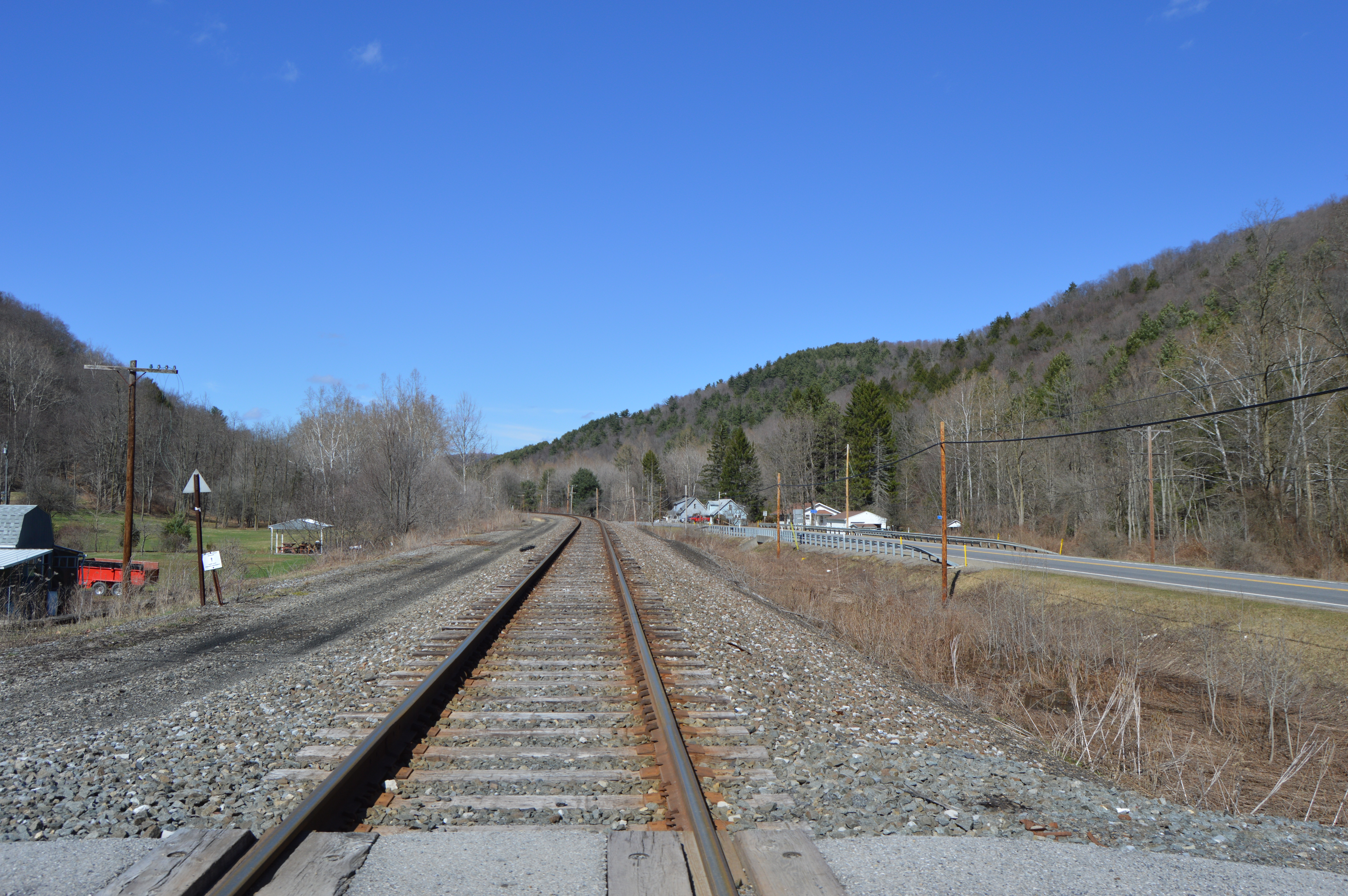
- Countryside north of Emporium

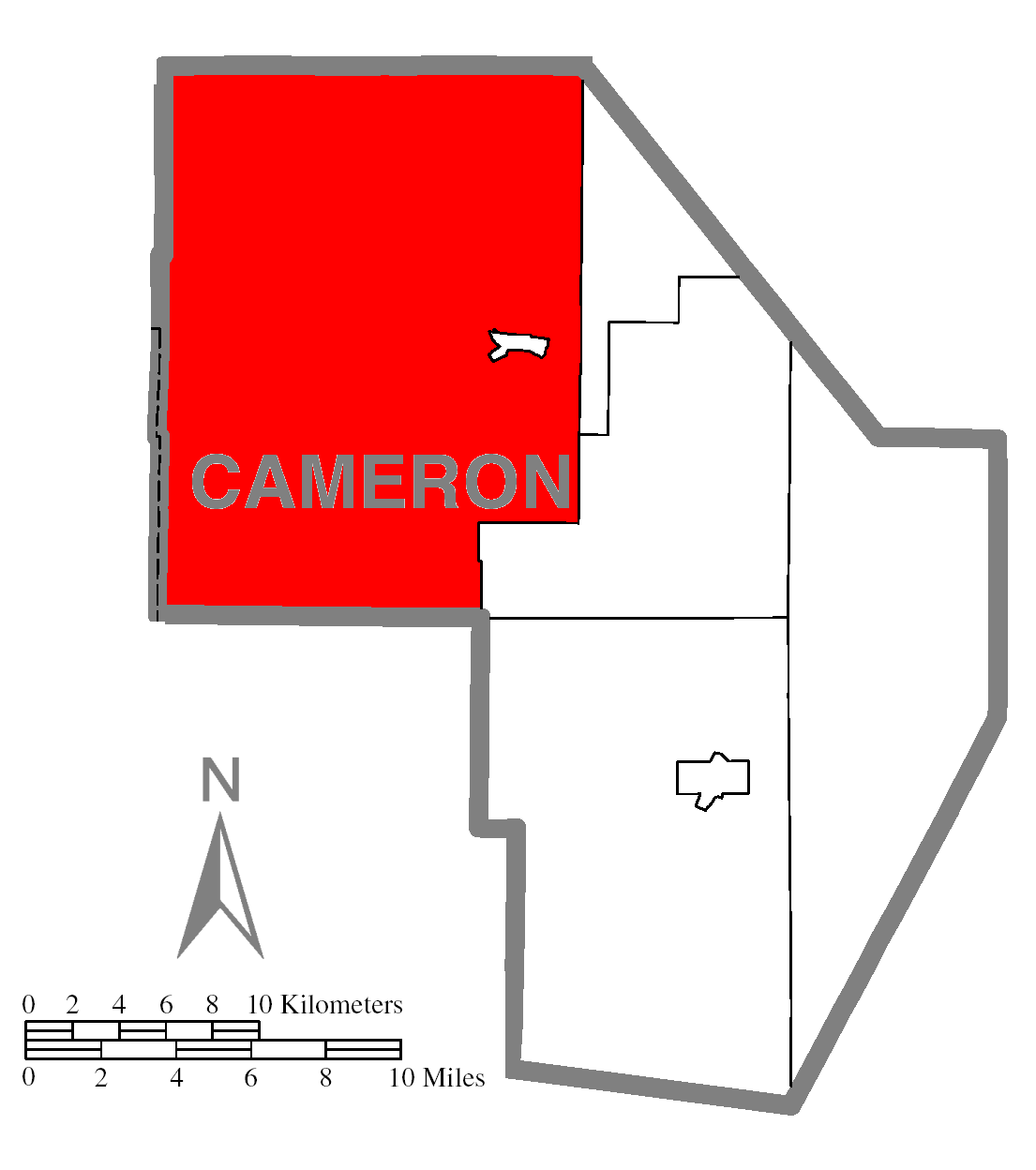
- Map of Cameron County, Pennsylvania highlighting Shippen Township

- Map of Cameron County, Pennsylvania
- Country: United States
- State: Pennsylvania
- County: Cameron
- Settled: 1810

Area
  - Total: 156.99 sq mi (406.61 km^{2})
  - Land: 156.62 sq mi (405.65 km^{2})
  - Water: 0.37 sq mi (0.96 km^{2})

Population (2020)
  - Total: 1,922 ▼
  - Estimate (2021): 1,884
  - Density: 13.1/sq mi (5.04/km^{2})
- Time zone: UTC-5 (Eastern (EST))
  - Summer (DST): UTC-4 (EDT)
- Area code: 814
- FIPS code: 42-023-70336

Shippen Township is a township in Cameron County, Pennsylvania, United States. The population was 1,922 at the 2020 census. The borough of Emporium, the county seat, lies enclaved within the eastern part of the township, but is not part of it.

== Geography ==
According to the United States Census Bureau, the township has a total area of 157.0 square miles (406.6 km^{2}), of which 156.6 square miles (405.7 km^{2}) is land and 0.39 square miles (1.0 km^{2}), or 0.24%, is water. It is the largest township in Pennsylvania, somewhat larger than the next largest, Rush Township in Centre County and Jones Township in Elk County. Its size is greater than that of Pennsylvania's two smallest counties, Montour and Philadelphia.

Shippen Township is bordered by McKean County to the north, Portage Township to the east, Lumber Township to the east and south and Elk County to the south and west.

It contains the census-designated place of Prospect Park.

== Demographics ==
Historical population
| Census | Pop. | Note | %± |
|---|---|---|---|
| 2000 | 2,495 | | — |
| 2010 | 2,232 | | −10.5% |
| 2020 | 1,922 | | −13.9% |
| 2021 (est.) | 1,884 | | −2.0% |
U.S. Decennial Census

As of the census of 2000, there were 2,495 people, 989 households, and 725 families residing in the township. The population density was 15.9 people per square mile (6.1/km^{2}). There were 1,458 housing units at an average density of 9.3/sq mi (3.6/km^{2}). The racial makeup of the township was 99.48% White, 0.08% African American, 0.12% Asian, and 0.32% from two or more races. Hispanic or Latino of any race were 0.24% of the population.

There were 989 households, out of which 29.7% had children under the age of 18 living with them, 61.7% were married couples living together, 7.2% had a female householder with no husband present, and 26.6% were non-families. 22.0% of all households were made up of individuals, and 10.7% had someone living alone who was 65 years of age or older. The average household size was 2.51 and the average family size was 2.93.

In the township the population was spread out, with 24.5% under the age of 18, 5.3% from 18 to 24, 24.3% from 25 to 44, 27.5% from 45 to 64, and 18.4% who were 65 years of age or older. The median age was 42 years. For every 100 females there were 105.2 males. For every 100 females age 18 and over, there were 105.0 males.

The median income for a household in the township was $37,781, and the median income for a family was $43,487. Males had a median income of $31,235 versus $21,422 for females. The per capita income for the township was $17,228. About 6.7% of families and 8.5% of the population were below the poverty line, including 14.3% of those under age 18 and 3.5% of those age 65 or over.
