= Driftwood Branch Sinnemahoning Creek =

River in Pennsylvania, United States

Coordinates: 41°20′11″N 78°08′00″W

Driftwood Branch Sinnemahoning Creek is a tributary of Sinnemahoning Creek in the U.S. state of Pennsylvania. This stream once called simply "Driftwood Creek" was so named for the driftwood which accumulated there.

== Course and tributaries ==
The Driftwood Branch rises in the northeast corner of Elk County and flows 36.4 miles (58.6 km) southeast to its confluence with the Bennett Branch.

Clear Creek, then North Creek, join the Driftwood Branch downstream of the community of Rich Valley.

West Creek joins downstream at the borough of Emporium, Cameron County, Pennsylvania.

Sinnemahoning Portage Creek joins approximately 1.0 mile (1.6 km) downstream.

The Driftwood Branch continues for 19.6 miles (31.5 km) to join the Bennett Branch at the borough of Driftwood to form Sinnemahoning Creek.

== See also ==
- List of rivers of Pennsylvania
