= Cameron County, Pennsylvania =

County in Pennsylvania, United States

- County
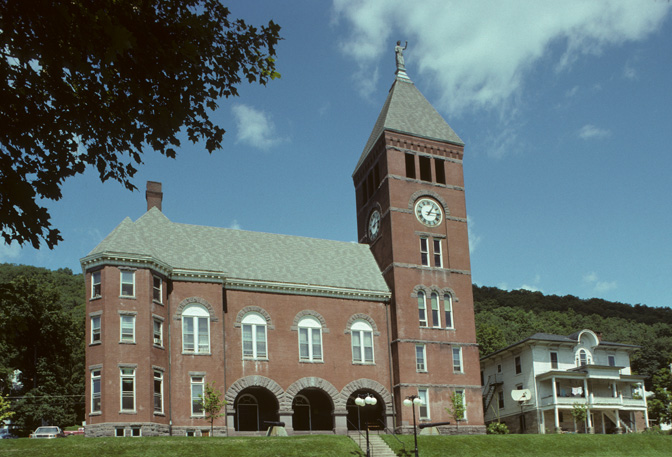
- Cameron County Courthouse

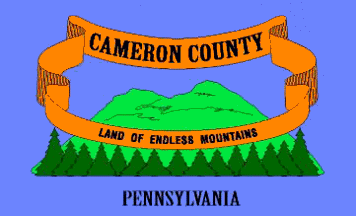
- Flag Logo

- Location within the U.S. state of Pennsylvania
- Coordinates: 41°26′N 78°12′W
- Country: United States
- State: Pennsylvania
- Founded: March 29, 1860
- Named for: Simon Cameron
- Seat: Emporium
- Largest borough: Emporium

Area
  - Total: 398.4 sq mi (1,032 km^{2})
  - Land: 396.2 sq mi (1,026 km^{2})
  - Water: 2.2 sq mi (5.7 km^{2}) 0.5%

Population (2020)
  - Total: 4,547
  - Estimate (2025): 4,211 ▼
  - Density: 11.4/sq mi (4.4/km^{2})
- Time zone: UTC−5 (Eastern)
  - Summer (DST): UTC−4 (EDT)
- Congressional district: 15th
- Website: www.cameroncountypa.com

Pennsylvania Historical Marker
- Designated: September 14, 1982

Cameron County is a county in the Commonwealth of Pennsylvania. As of the 2020 census, the population was 4,547, making it Pennsylvania's least populous county. Its county seat is Emporium. The county was created on March 29, 1860, from parts of Clinton, Elk, McKean, and Potter counties. It is named for Senator Simon Cameron. The county is part of the North Central region of the commonwealth. (Note: Includes Clearfield, Jefferson, Tioga, McKean, Warren, Clarion, Elk, Potter, Forest and Cameron Counties)

== Geography ==
According to the U.S. Census Bureau, the county has a total area of 398.4 square miles (1,032 km^{2}), of which 396.2 square miles (1,026 km^{2}) is land and 2.2 square miles (5.7 km^{2}) (0.5%) is water. It has a warm-summer humid continental climate (Dfb) and average monthly temperatures in Emporium range from 24.2 °F in January to 69.3 °F in July, while in Driftwood they range from 24.9 °F in January to 69.9 °F in July.

=== Adjacent counties ===
- McKean County (north)
- Potter County (northeast)
- Clinton County (east)
- Clearfield County (south)
- Elk County (west)

=== Major roads ===
Cameron County is the only county in the state of Pennsylvania to not be crossed by either an interstate or U.S. Route.

- PA 46
- PA 120
- PA 155
- PA 555
- PA 872

== Demographics ==
Historical population
Census	Pop.	Note	%±
1870	4,273		—
1880	5,159		20.7%
1890	7,238		40.3%
1900	7,048		−2.6%
1910	7,644		8.5%
1920	6,297		−17.6%
1930	5,307		−15.7%
1940	6,852		29.1%
1950	7,023		2.5%
1960	7,586		8.0%
1970	7,096		−6.5%
1980	6,674		−5.9%
1990	5,913		−11.4%
2000	5,974		1.0%
2010	5,085		−14.9%
2020	4,547		−10.6%
2025 (est.)	4,211	▼	−7.4%
U.S. Decennial Census; 1790–1960 1900–1990; 1990–2000 2010–2017

=== Racial and ethnic composition ===
Cameron County, Pennsylvania – Racial and ethnic composition Note: the US Census treats Hispanic/Latino as an ethnic category. This table excludes Latinos from the racial categories and assigns them to a separate category. Hispanics/Latinos may be of any race.
Race / Ethnicity (NH = Non-Hispanic)	Pop 1980	Pop 1990	Pop 2000	Pop 2010	Pop 2020	% 1980	% 1990	% 2000	% 2010	% 2020
White alone (NH)	6,622	5,878	5,882	4,985	4,271	99.22%	99.41%	98.46%	98.03%	93.93%
Black or African American alone (NH)	6	7	21	12	12	0.09%	0.12%	0.35%	0.24%	0.26%
Native American or Alaska Native alone (NH)	23	14	8	13	8	0.34%	0.24%	0.13%	0.26%	0.18%
Asian alone (NH)	2	6	7	14	29	0.03%	0.10%	0.12%	0.28%	0.64%
Native Hawaiian or Pacific Islander alone (NH)	x	x	0	0	0	x	x	0.00%	0.00%	0.00%
Other race alone (NH)	0	5	2	0	12	0.00%	0.08%	0.03%	0.00%	0.26%
Mixed race or Multiracial (NH)	x	x	20	42	129	x	x	0.33%	0.83%	2.84%
Hispanic or Latino (any race)	21	3	34	19	86	0.31%	0.05%	0.57%	0.37%	1.89%
Total	6,674	5,913	5,974	5,085	4,547	100.00%	100.00%	100.00%	100.00%	100.00%

=== 2020 census ===
As of the 2020 census, the county had a population of 4,547. The median age was 51.3 years. 17.5% of residents were under the age of 18 and 27.7% of residents were 65 years of age or older. For every 100 females there were 105.7 males, and for every 100 females age 18 and over there were 104.4 males age 18 and over.

The racial makeup of the county was 94.2% White, 0.4% Black or African American, 0.2% American Indian and Alaska Native, 0.6% Asian, <0.1% Native Hawaiian and Pacific Islander, 0.9% from some other race, and 3.7% from two or more races. Hispanic or Latino residents of any race comprised 1.9% of the population.

<0.1% of residents lived in urban areas, while 100.0% lived in rural areas.

There were 2,120 households in the county, of which 21.9% had children under the age of 18 living in them. Of all households, 43.4% were married-couple households, 24.9% were households with a male householder and no spouse or partner present, and 24.2% were households with a female householder and no spouse or partner present. About 36.1% of all households were made up of individuals and 18.6% had someone living alone who was 65 years of age or older.

There were 3,932 housing units, of which 46.1% were vacant. Among occupied housing units, 74.2% were owner-occupied and 25.8% were renter-occupied. The homeowner vacancy rate was 2.8% and the rental vacancy rate was 12.5%.

=== 2000 census ===
As of the 2000 census, there were 5,974 people, 2,465 households, and 1,624 families residing in the county. The population density was 15 people per square mile (5.8 people/km^{2}). There were 4,592 housing units at an average density of 12 units per square mile (4.6/km^{2}). The racial makeup of the county was 98.83% White, 0.35% Black or African American, 0.13% Native American, 0.12% Asian, 0.05% Pacific Islander, 0.05% from other races, and 0.47% from two or more races. 0.57% of the population were Hispanic or Latino of any race. 33.5% were of German, 15.7% Irish, 14.5% American, 13.1% Italian, 9.2% English and 5.7% Polish ancestry.

There were 2,465 households, out of which 27.70% had children under the age of 18 living with them, 52.40% were married couples living together, 9.20% had a female householder with no husband present, and 34.10% were non-families. 30.10% of all households were made up of individuals, and 15.40% had someone living alone who was 65 years of age or older. The average household size was 2.39 and the average family size was 2.96.

In the county, the population was spread out, with 24.50% under the age of 18, 6.00% from 18 to 24, 24.90% from 25 to 44, 24.80% from 45 to 64, and 19.80% who were 65 years of age or older. The median age was 41 years. For every 100 females there were 96.60 males. For every 100 females age 18 and over, there were 94.60 males.

== Law and government ==
United States presidential election results for Cameron County, Pennsylvania
Year	Republican		Democratic		Third party(ies)	
Year	No.	%	No.	%	No.	%
1888	782	58.14%	551	40.97%	12	0.89%
1892	829	52.37%	701	44.28%	53	3.35%
1896	925	59.60%	575	37.05%	52	3.35%
1900	971	63.59%	514	33.66%	42	2.75%
1904	1,228	73.75%	404	24.26%	33	1.98%
1908	1,110	65.72%	533	31.56%	46	2.72%
1912	388	30.10%	291	22.58%	610	47.32%
1916	713	59.17%	452	37.51%	40	3.32%
1920	1,364	68.06%	497	24.80%	143	7.14%
1924	1,366	77.18%	260	14.69%	144	8.14%
1928	1,564	75.52%	501	24.19%	6	0.29%
1932	1,438	64.31%	748	33.45%	50	2.24%
1936	1,801	53.21%	1,538	45.44%	46	1.36%
1940	1,793	55.15%	1,450	44.60%	8	0.25%
1944	1,729	60.60%	1,115	39.08%	9	0.32%
1948	1,596	64.75%	858	34.81%	11	0.45%
1952	2,307	69.05%	1,020	30.53%	14	0.42%
1956	2,462	74.52%	841	25.45%	1	0.03%
1960	2,129	61.06%	1,353	38.80%	5	0.14%
1964	1,376	41.89%	1,904	57.96%	5	0.15%
1968	1,822	58.96%	1,104	35.73%	164	5.31%
1972	1,935	68.45%	828	29.29%	64	2.26%
1976	1,616	54.28%	1,319	44.31%	42	1.41%
1980	1,795	59.24%	1,112	36.70%	123	4.06%
1984	2,031	67.05%	990	32.68%	8	0.26%
1988	1,731	65.20%	901	33.94%	23	0.87%
1992	1,173	43.80%	824	30.77%	681	25.43%
1996	1,113	49.89%	822	36.84%	296	13.27%
2000	1,383	61.58%	779	34.68%	84	3.74%
2004	1,599	66.46%	794	33.00%	13	0.54%
2008	1,323	58.62%	879	38.95%	55	2.44%
2012	1,359	63.95%	724	34.07%	42	1.98%
2016	1,589	71.90%	531	24.03%	90	4.07%
2020	1,771	72.58%	634	25.98%	35	1.43%
2024	1,654	74.27%	538	24.16%	35	1.57%

United States Senate election results for Cameron County, Pennsylvania1
Year	Republican		Democratic		Third party(ies)	
Year	No.	%	No.	%	No.	%
1994	1,234	61.70%	704	35.20%	62	3.10%
2000	1,524	69.59%	626	28.58%	40	1.83%
2006	914	51.87%	848	48.13%	0	0.00%
2012	1,277	60.44%	767	36.30%	69	3.27%
2018	1,080	61.19%	653	37.00%	32	1.81%
2024	1,558	70.37%	580	26.20%	76	3.43%

United States Senate election results for Cameron County, Pennsylvania3
Year	Republican		Democratic		Third party(ies)	
Year	No.	%	No.	%	No.	%
1992	1,290	49.43%	1,126	43.14%	194	7.43%
1998	987	62.31%	517	32.64%	80	5.05%
2004	1,412	59.48%	692	29.15%	270	11.37%
2010	1,005	64.38%	556	35.62%	0	0.00%
2016	1,390	64.53%	593	27.53%	171	7.94%
2022	1,247	66.01%	547	28.96%	95	5.03%

Pennsylvania Gubernatorial election results for Cameron County
Year	Republican		Democratic		Third party(ies)	
Year	No.	%	No.	%	No.	%
1970	1,216	48.91%	1,228	49.40%	42	1.69%
1974	1,447	59.23%	983	40.24%	13	0.53%
1978	1,377	58.25%	982	41.54%	5	0.21%
1982	1,353	52.04%	1,239	47.65%	8	0.31%
1986	1,245	52.66%	1,109	46.91%	10	0.42%
1990	721	35.38%	1,314	64.47%	3	0.15%
1994	748	37.08%	550	27.27%	719	35.65%
1998	688	42.76%	266	16.53%	655	40.71%
2002	1,032	63.39%	571	35.07%	25	1.54%
2006	989	55.50%	793	44.50%	0	0.00%
2010	1,100	70.47%	461	29.53%	0	0.00%
2014	779	56.12%	609	43.88%	0	0.00%
2018	1,127	63.56%	619	34.91%	27	1.52%
2022	1,200	63.49%	639	33.81%	51	2.70%

=== Voter registration ===
As of February 7, 2024, there are 2,931 registered voters in Cameron County.

Chart of Voter Registration
1. Republican (62.2%)
2. Democratic (25.4%)
3. Independent (7.71%)
4. Other Parties (4.67%)
- Republican: 1,823 (62.20%)
- Democratic: 745 (25.42%)
- Independent: 226 (7.71%)
- Third Party: 137 (4.67%)

=== Law enforcement ===
As of 2016 all areas in the county use the Pennsylvania State Police (PSP) in a law enforcement capacity, either with part-time police departments or with no other police departments.

=== County-row offices ===
- County Commissioners: Jessica Herzing (R); James D. Moate (R); Josh Zucal (D)
- Sheriff: Doug Homan (R)
- Prothonotary/Clerk/Register/Recorder: Mary Grace Olay (R)
- Treasurer: Tara Newton (R)
- District Attorney: Paul J. Malizia (R)

=== State senate ===
- Cris Dush, Republican, Pennsylvania's 25th Senatorial District

=== State House of Representatives ===
- Martin T. Causer, Republican, Pennsylvania's 67th Representative District

=== United States House of Representatives ===
- Glenn "G.T." Thompson, Republican, Pennsylvania's 15th congressional district

=== United States Senate ===
- Dave McCormick, Republican
- John Fetterman, Democrat

== Education ==
There is a single K-12 school district, Cameron County School District.

== Recreation ==
There are three Pennsylvania state parks that are partly in Cameron County.

- Bucktail State Park Natural Area is a 75-mile (121-km) scenic route along Pennsylvania Route 120 stretching from Lock Haven in Clinton County to Emporium the county seat of Cameron County.
- Sinnemahoning State Park
- Sizerville State Park
  - both of these state parks straddle the Cameron and Potter County line.

The West Creek Rail Trail has been built on the abandoned rail corridor between Emporium and St. Mary's in Elk County. It provides a paved surface with guard rails and is suitable for hiking or biking in the warm seasons or snowmobiling in winter.

The Fred Woods Trail offers a 4.57 mile loop of blazed trail with scenic valley views and a challenging section running through unique rock formations. The trailhead is accessed off Mason Hill Road above Driftwood, PA.

== Communities ==
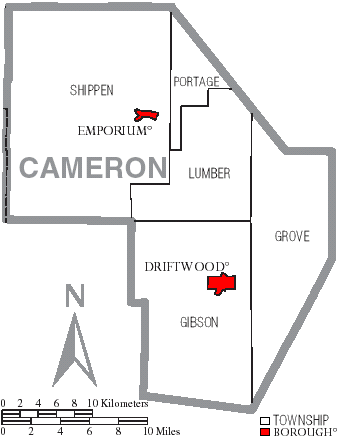
Map of Cameron County, Pennsylvania with Municipal Labels showing Boroughs (red) and Townships (white).

Under Pennsylvania law, there are four types of incorporated municipalities: cities, boroughs, townships, and, in at most two cases, towns. The following boroughs and townships are located in Cameron County:

=== Boroughs ===
- Driftwood
- Emporium (county seat)

=== Townships ===
- Gibson
- Grove
- Lumber
- Portage
- Shippen

=== Census-designated place ===
- Prospect Park

=== Population ranking ===
The population ranking of the following table is based on the 2010 census of Cameron County.

† county seat

Rank	City/Town/etc.	Population (2010 Census)	Municipal type	Incorporated
1	† Emporium	2,073	Borough	1864
2	Prospect Park	327	CDP	
3	Driftwood	67	Borough	1872

== Notable people ==
- Tom Mix
- Joseph T. McNarney
- Nate Sestina
