= Emporium, Pennsylvania =

Borough in the United States

- Borough
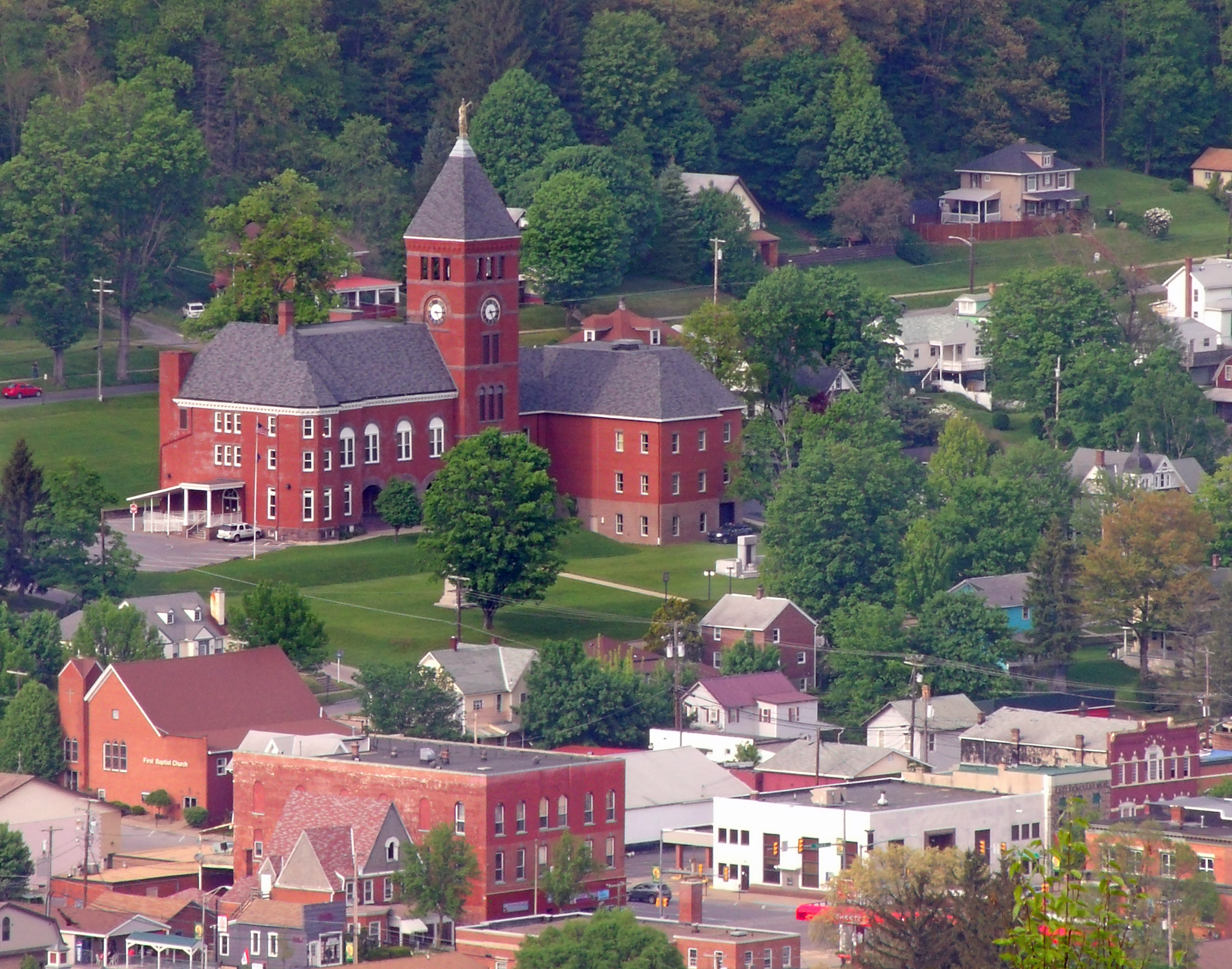
- Emporium and the Cameron County Courthouse from the Whitmore Road vista
- Nickname: Empo
- Motto: Land of the Endless Mountains
- Location of Emporium in Cameron County, Pennsylvania.

- Location within the U.S. state of Pennsylvania Emporium (the United States)
- Coordinates: 41°30′41″N 78°14′11″W
- Country: United States
- State: Pennsylvania
- County: Cameron
- Settled: 1810
- Incorporated (borough): 1864

Government
  - Type: Borough Council
  - Mayor: Justin M. Zimmer

Area
  - Total: 0.75 sq mi (1.95 km^{2})
  - Land: 0.71 sq mi (1.84 km^{2})
  - Water: 0.042 sq mi (0.11 km^{2})
- Elevation: 1,031 ft (314 m)

Population (2020)
  - Total: 1,923
  - Density: 2,709/sq mi (1,046.1/km^{2})
- Time zone: Eastern (EST)
  - Summer (DST): EDT
- Zip code: 15834
- Area code: 814
- FIPS code: 42-23600
- Website: emporiumborough.org

Emporium is a borough and the county seat of Cameron County in the U.S. state of Pennsylvania. Early in the twentieth century, there were large power plants and manufacturers of radio tubes and incandescent lamps (Sylvania Electric Products), paving brick, flour, iron, lumber, and sole leather. In 1900, 2,463 people lived in Emporium, and in 1910, the population was 2,916. By 2010, the population had dropped to 2,073, and at the 2020 census, the population was 1,961.

== Geography ==
Emporium is located in northern Cameron County at 41°30′41″N 78°14′11″W (41.511288, -78.236418). It is in the valley of the Driftwood Branch of Sinnemahoning Creek, flowing southeast towards the West Branch Susquehanna River. Pennsylvania Route 120 passes through the borough, leading southeast 18 miles (29 km) to Driftwood and eventually Lock Haven and Williamsport, and west 19 miles (31 km) to St. Marys on the Eastern Continental Divide. Pennsylvania Route 46 leads northwest from Emporium 27 miles (43 km) to Smethport, and Pennsylvania Route 155 leads north 24 miles (39 km) to Port Allegany, both of which communities are in the Allegheny River basin.

According to the United States Census Bureau, Emporium has a total area of 0.73 square miles (1.9 km^{2}), of which 0.69 square miles (1.8 km^{2}) is land and 0.04 square miles (0.1 km^{2}), or 5.51%, is water.

=== Climate ===
Climate data for Emporium, Pennsylvania (1991–2020)
Month	Jan	Feb	Mar	Apr	May	Jun	Jul	Aug	Sep	Oct	Nov	Dec	Year
Mean daily maximum °F (°C)	33.2 (0.7)	36.6 (2.6)	46.1 (7.8)	59.7 (15.4)	71.4 (21.9)	78.8 (26.0)	82.0 (27.8)	81.1 (27.3)	74.3 (23.5)	62.0 (16.7)	48.8 (9.3)	37.5 (3.1)	59.3 (15.2)
Daily mean °F (°C)	24.6 (−4.1)	26.5 (−3.1)	35.2 (1.8)	46.9 (8.3)	57.9 (14.4)	66.4 (19.1)	70.4 (21.3)	69.2 (20.7)	62.4 (16.9)	50.6 (10.3)	39.4 (4.1)	30.1 (−1.1)	48.3 (9.1)
Mean daily minimum °F (°C)	16.0 (−8.9)	16.4 (−8.7)	24.3 (−4.3)	34.1 (1.2)	44.5 (6.9)	54.1 (12.3)	58.7 (14.8)	57.3 (14.1)	50.5 (10.3)	39.2 (4.0)	29.9 (−1.2)	22.6 (−5.2)	37.3 (2.9)
Average precipitation inches (mm)	3.06 (78)	2.32 (59)	3.20 (81)	3.76 (96)	3.66 (93)	4.20 (107)	4.53 (115)	4.50 (114)	4.15 (105)	3.82 (97)	3.39 (86)	3.25 (83)	43.84 (1,114)
Average snowfall inches (cm)	12.4 (31)	10.3 (26)	10.8 (27)	0.9 (2.3)	0.0 (0.0)	0.0 (0.0)	0.0 (0.0)	0.0 (0.0)	0.0 (0.0)	0.1 (0.25)	3.1 (7.9)	9.5 (24)	47.1 (118.45)
Source: NOAA

== Demographics ==
Historical population
Census	Pop.	Note	%±
1870	898		—
1880	1,156		28.7%
1890	2,147		85.7%
1900	2,463		14.7%
1910	2,916		18.4%
1920	3,036		4.1%
1930	2,929		−3.5%
1940	3,775		28.9%
1950	3,646		−3.4%
1960	3,397		−6.8%
1970	3,074		−9.5%
1980	2,837		−7.7%
1990	2,513		−11.4%
2000	2,526		0.5%
2010	2,073		−17.9%
2020	1,923		−7.2%
2021 (est.)	1,924	▲	0.1%

As of the census of 2010, there were 2,073 people, 956 households, and 498 families residing in the borough. The population density was 2,961.4 inhabitants per square mile (1,143.4/km^{2}). There were 1,140 housing units at an average density of 1,628.6 per square mile (628.8/km^{2}). The racial makeup of the borough was 98.1% White, 0.5% African American, 0.4% Native American, 0.4% Asian, and 0.6% from two or more races. Hispanic or Latino of any race were 0.6% of the population.

There were 956 households, out of which 25.7% had children under the age of 18 living with them, 34.9% were married couples living together, 11.8% had a female householder with no husband present, and 47.9% were non-families. 42.4% of all households were made up of individuals, and 19.6% had someone living alone who was 65 years of age or older. The average household size was 2.09 and the average family size was 2.87.

In the borough the population was spread out, with 21.8% under the age of 18, 57.4% from 18 to 64, and 20.8% who were 65 years of age or older. The median age was 44 years.

The median income for a household in the borough was $32,468, and the median income for a family was $46,544. Males had a median income of $32,473 versus $29,489 for females. The per capita income for the borough was $18,713. About 10.7% of families and 16.3% of the population were below the poverty line, including 27.7% of those under age 18 and 11.9% of those age 65 or over.

== Notable people ==
- Joseph T. McNarney, World War I flying ace, four-star general, Deputy Chief of Staff of the U.S. Army during World War II, Supreme Allied Commander of the Mediterranean Theater, a Military Governor of the U.S. Occupation Zone in Germany. He was appointed Knight Commander of the Order of the Bath by King George VI of the United Kingdom.
- Nate Sestina (born 1997), basketball player in the Israeli Basketball Premier League

== Gallery ==
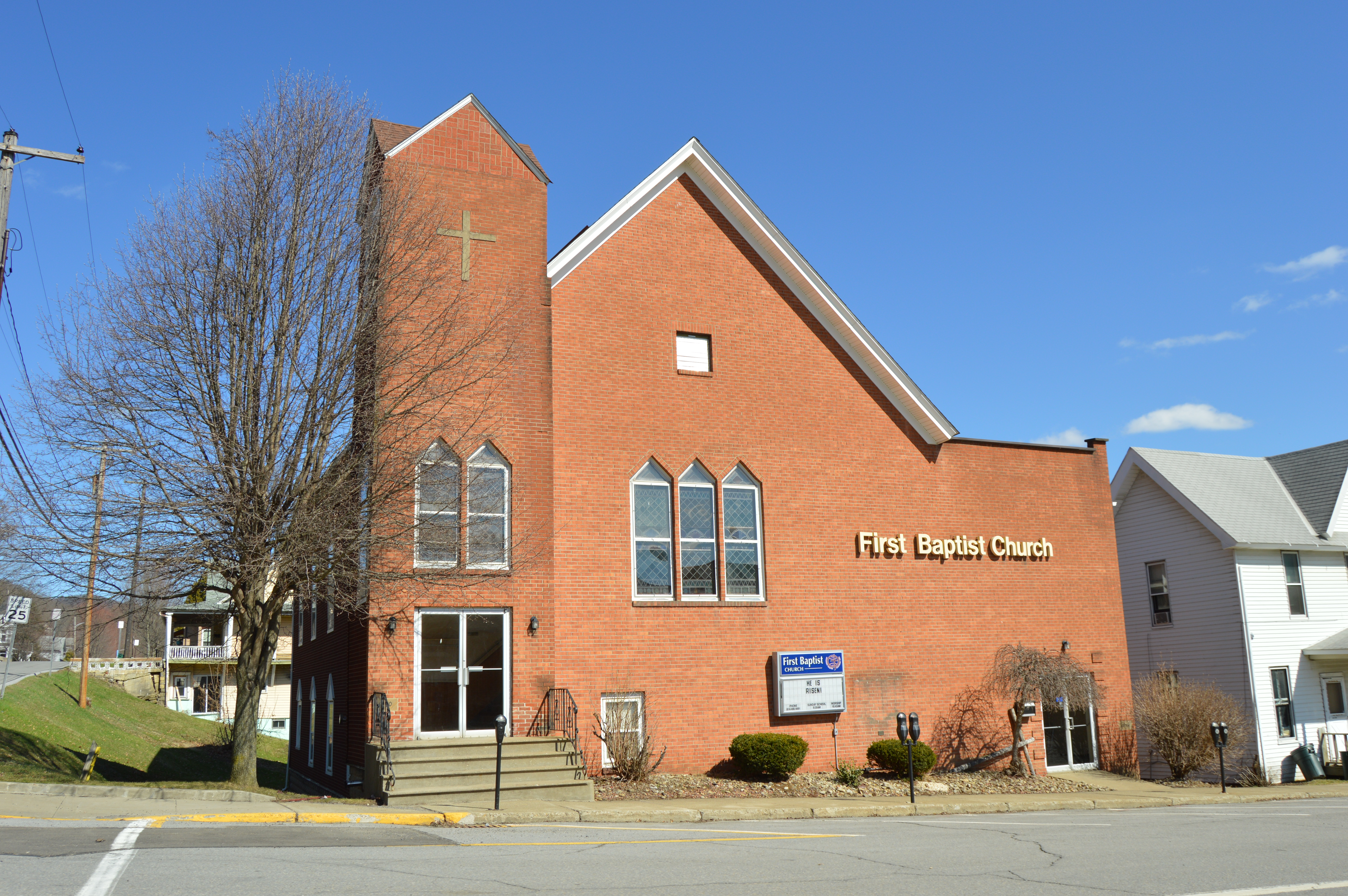
First Baptist Church

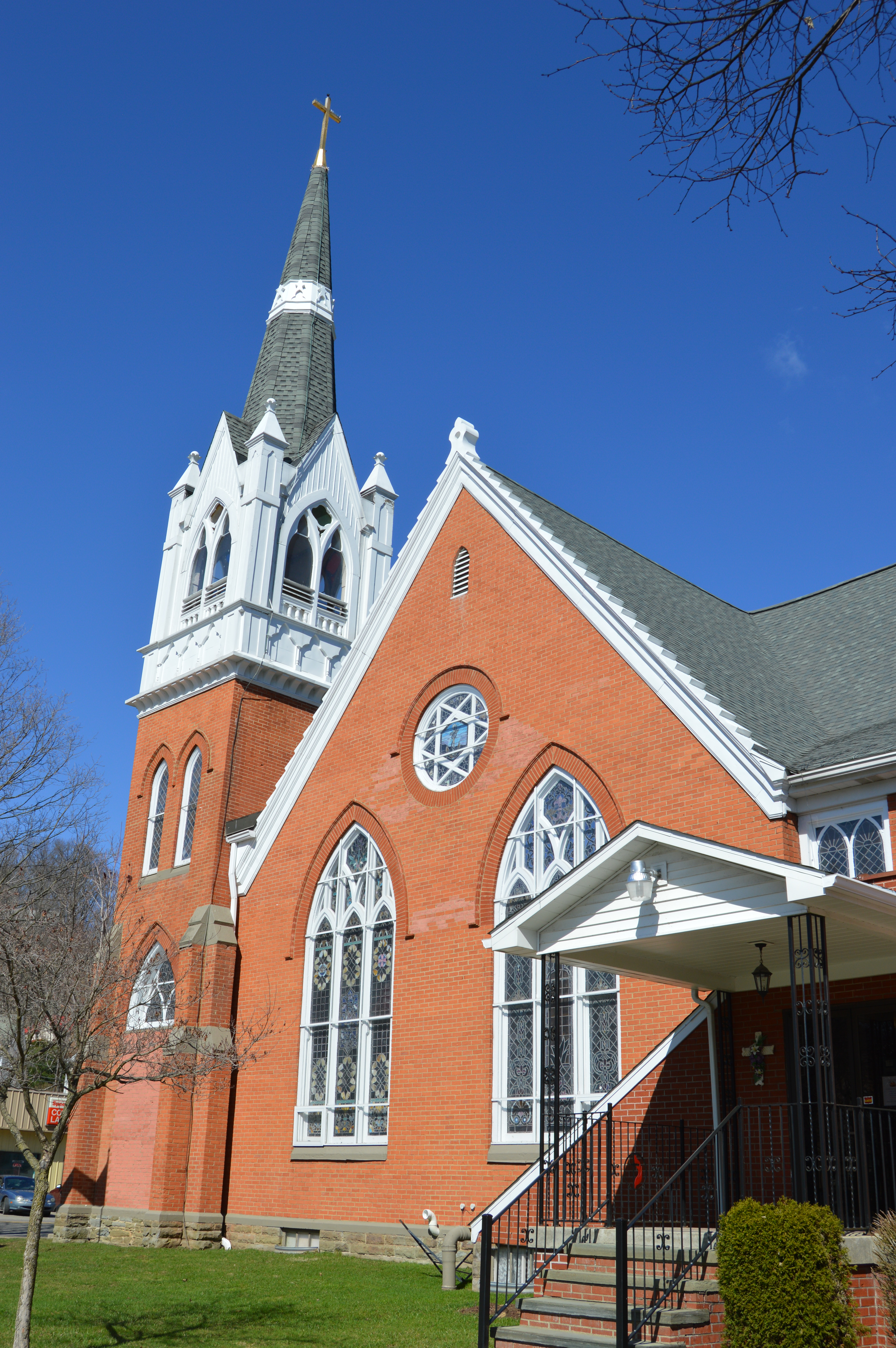
First United Methodist Church

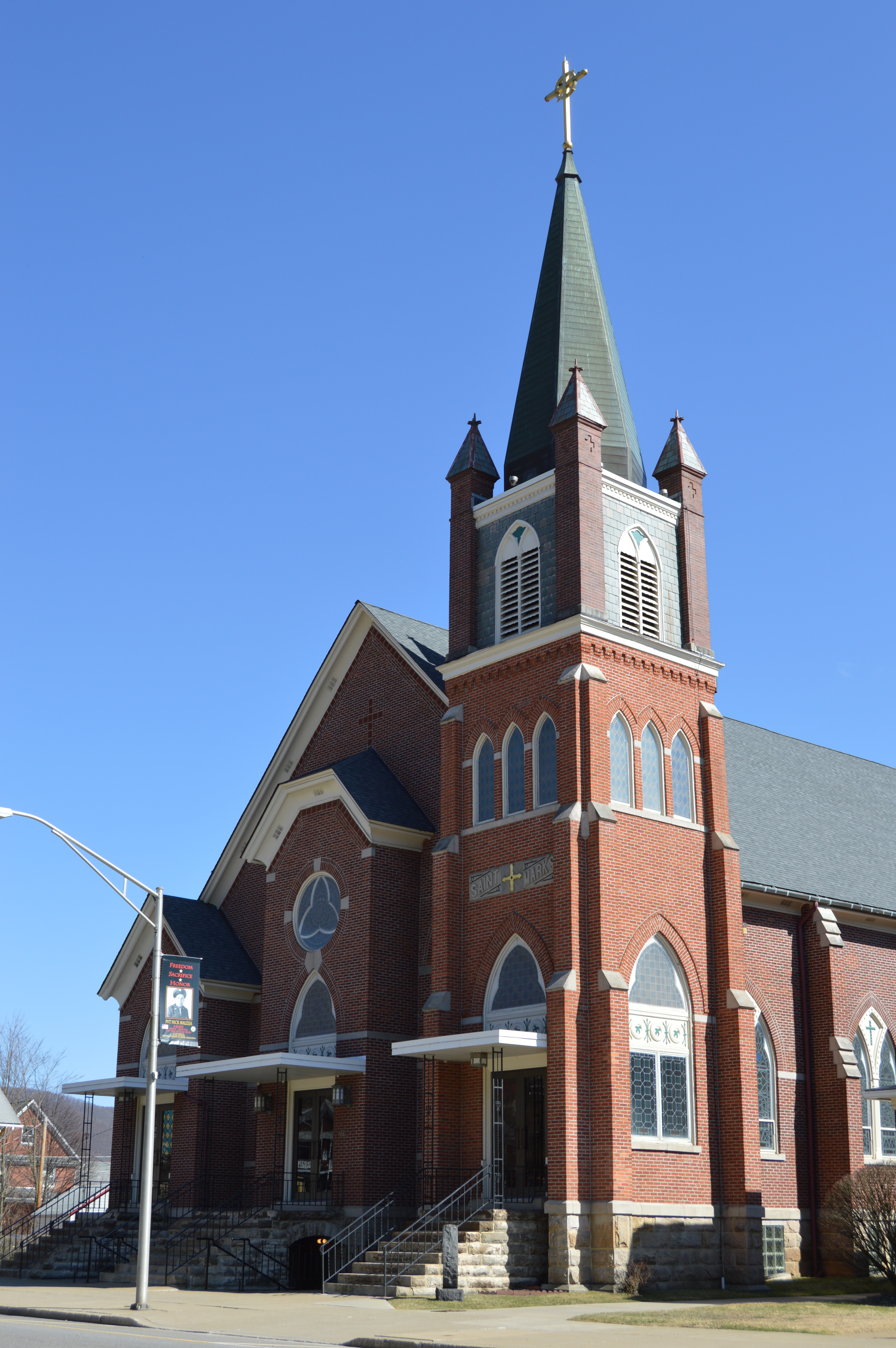
St. Mark's Catholic Church

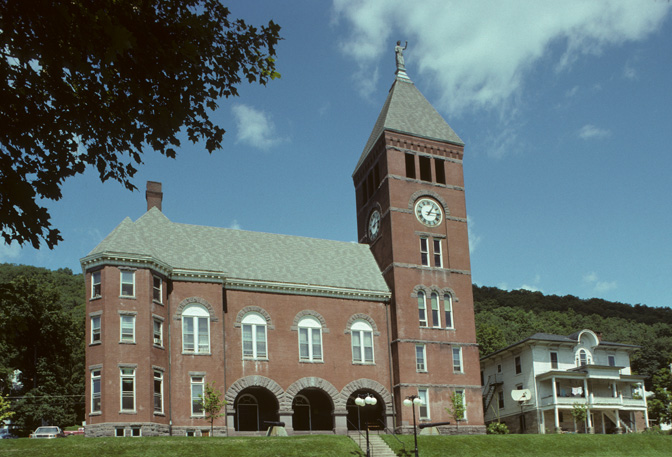
Cameron County Courthouse
