= Sinnemahoning Creek =

Watercourse in Pennsylvania, US

Coordinates: 41°15′41″N 77°54′09″W

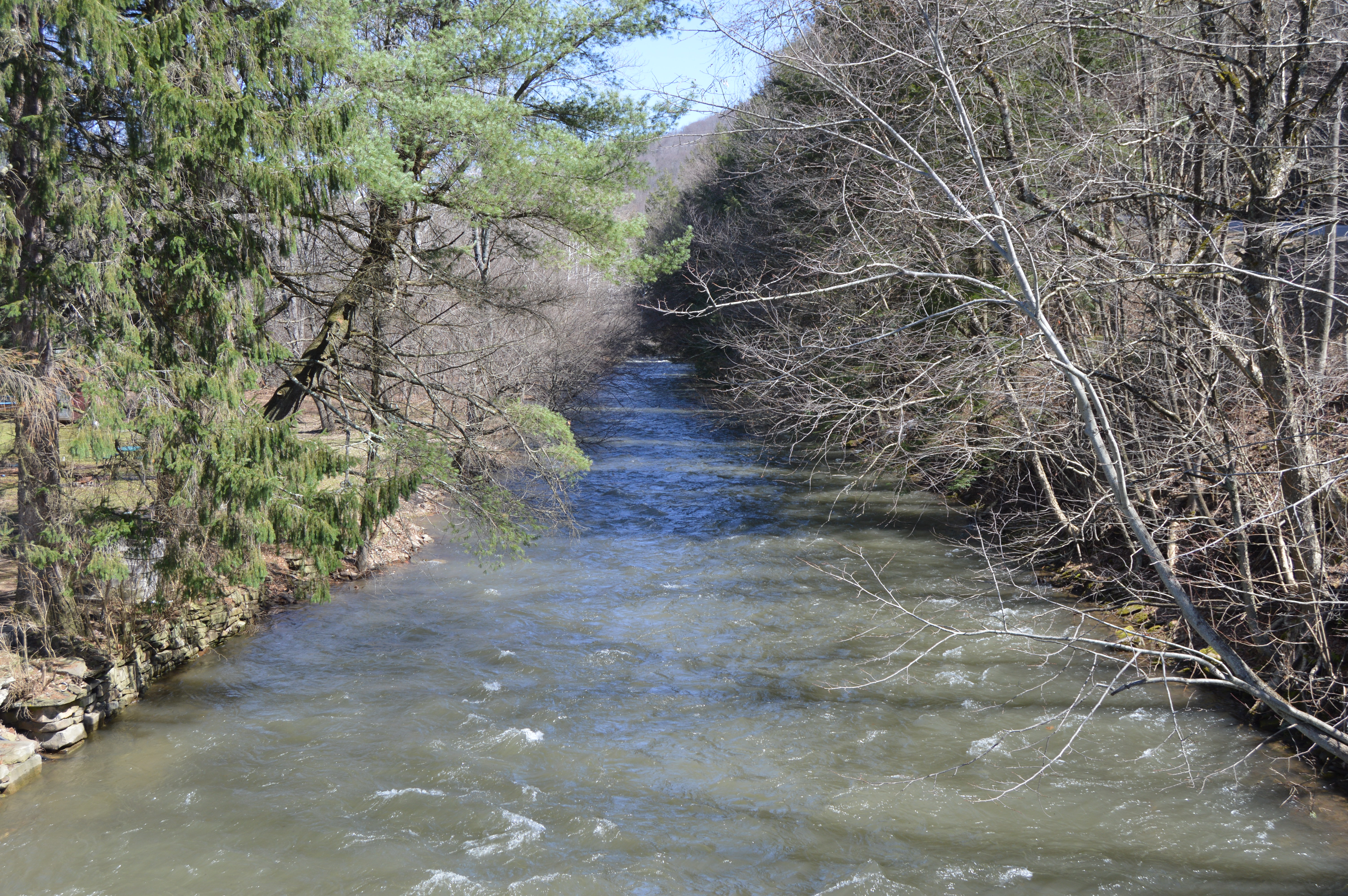
The creek's East Fork at Wharton

Sinnemahoning Creek is a 15.7-mile-long (25.3 km) tributary of the West Branch Susquehanna River in Cameron, Potter, and Clinton counties, Pennsylvania, in the United States.

Sinnemahoning Creek (meaning "stony lick" in the Lenape language) is formed by the confluence of the Bennett and Driftwood branches at the borough of Driftwood.

The tributary First Fork Sinnemahoning Creek joins 3.7 miles (6.0 km) downstream of Driftwood. Sinnemahoning Creek continues 12.0 miles (19.3 km) to join the West Branch Susquehanna River at the village of Keating.

== See also ==
- Kettle Creek (Pennsylvania)
- List of rivers of Pennsylvania
