= Keystone Central School District =

School district in Pennsylvania

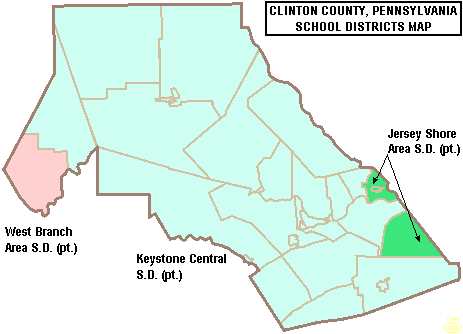

Address
- 86 Administration Drive Mill Hall, Pennsylvania, (Clinton County), 17751; United States
- Coordinates: 41.135°N 77.446°W

District information
- Type: Public
- Motto: Respect for Yesterday, Pride for Today, Plans for Tomorrow
- Superintendent: Francis Redmon
- Asst. superintendent(s): Randy Zangara

Students and staff
- Students: 3,450
- District mascot: CM Wildcat, BHS Bucks
- Colors: CM Blue, White, BHS Red, White

Other information
- Website: www.kcsd.us

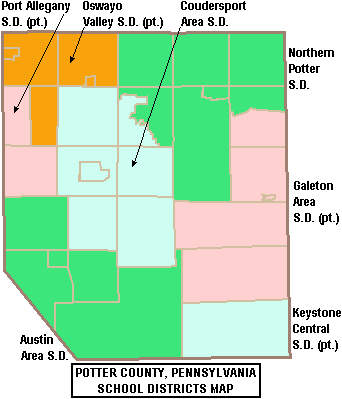
Potter County School Districts

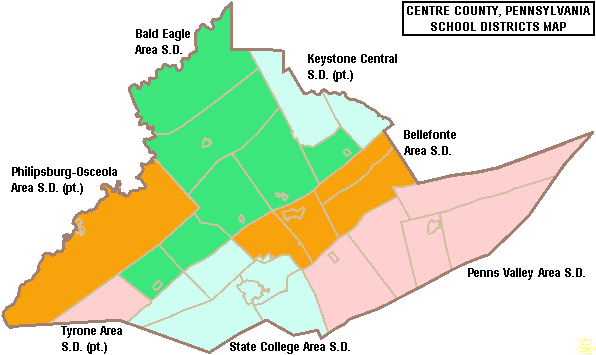
Centre County School Districts

The Keystone Central School District (KCSD) is a midsized rural, public school district based in Lock Haven, Pennsylvania, that includes public schools in Clinton County. The district serves students in the city of Lock Haven, the boroughs of Beech Creek, Flemington, Loganton, Mill Hall, Renovo, South Renovo, as well as Allison Township, Bald Eagle Township, Beech Creek Township, Castanea Township, Chapman Township, Colebrook Township, Dunnstable Township, Gallagher Township, Greene Township, Grugan Township, Lamar Township, Leidy Township, Logan Township, Noyes Township, Pine Creek Township (partial), Porter Township, Wayne Township, and Woodward Township in Clinton County. The district also serves Curtin Township and Liberty Township of Centre County, and Stewardson Township of Potter County. It encompasses approximately 1,048 square miles (2,710 km^{2}) square miles, making it the largest public school district by land area in Pennsylvania. According to 2000 federal census data, it served a resident population of 36,950. By 2010, the district's population was 37,794 people, making it a district of the third class. The educational attainment levels for the school district population (25 years old and over) were 85.7% high school graduates and 17.2% college graduates. The district is one of the 500 public school districts of Pennsylvania.

According to the Pennsylvania Budget and Policy Center, 51.7% of the district's pupils lived at 185% or below the Federal Poverty Level as shown by their eligibility for the federal free or reduced price school meal programs in 2012. In 2013 the Pennsylvania Department of Education, reported that 71 students in the Keystone Central School District were homeless.

In 2009, Keystone Central School District residents’ per capita income was $15,619, while the median family income was $37,532. In the Commonwealth, the median family income was $49,501 and the United States median family income was $49,445, in 2010. In Clinton County, the median household income was $42,184. By 2013, the median household income in the United States rose to $52,100. In 2014, the median household income in the USA was $53,700.

Keystone Central School District operates 5 elementary schools, three secondary schools (one middle school, one high school, and one combined middle and high school), and a career technology center and a cyber academy.

High school students may choose to attend the Keystone Central Career Technology Center (KCCTC) for training in the construction and mechanical trades. The Central Intermediate Unit IU10 provides the district with a wide variety of services like specialized education for disabled students and hearing, background checks for employees, state-mandated recognizing and reporting child abuse training, speech and visual disability services and criminal background check processing for prospective employees and professional development for staff and faculty.

== Schools ==
=== Elementary schools ===
- Liberty-Curtin Elementary School
  - 11125 North Eagle Valley Rd.
    Blanchard 16826
- Mill Hall Elementary School
  - 210 Kyler Ave.
    Mill Hall 17751
- Renovo Elementary School
  - 1301 Bucktail Av.
    Renovo 17764
- Robb Elementary School
  - 400 E. Church St.
    Lock Haven 17745
- Woodward Elementary School
  - 35 King St.
    Lock Haven 17745

=== Secondary schools ===
- Central Mountain High School (9-12)
- Central Mountain Middle School (5-8)
- Bucktail High School (9-12)
- Bucktail Area Middle School (6-8)

== Extracurriculars ==
Keystone Central School District offers a variety of clubs, activities and an extensive sports program. Keystone Central School Board determines eligibility policies to participate in these programs.

=== Sports ===
The district funds:

Central Mountain High School

Boys

- Baseball - AAAA
- Basketball- AAAA
- Cross country - AAA
- Football - AAAA
- Golf - AAA
- Soccer - AAA
- Swimming and diving - AAA
- Tennis - AAA
- Track and field - AAA
- Wrestling - AAA

Girls

- Basketball - AAAA
- Cross country - AAA
- Golf - AAA
- Soccer - AAA
- Softball - AAAA
- Swimming and diving - AAA
- Tennis - AAA
- Track and field - AA
- Volleyball

CM Middle school sports

Boys

- Basketball
- Football
- Soccer
- Track and field
- Wrestling

Girls

- Basketball
- Soccer
- Softball
- Track and field

Bucktail Area High School

Boys

- Baseball - A
- Basketball- A
- Football - A

Girls

- Basketball - A
- Softball- A
- Tennis - AA

Bucktail Junior High School

Boys

- Basketball
- Football
- Wrestling

Girls

- Basketball
- Softball

According to PIAA directory July 2015
