= Farwell, Pennsylvania =

Unincorporated community in Pennsylvania, US

- Census-designated place
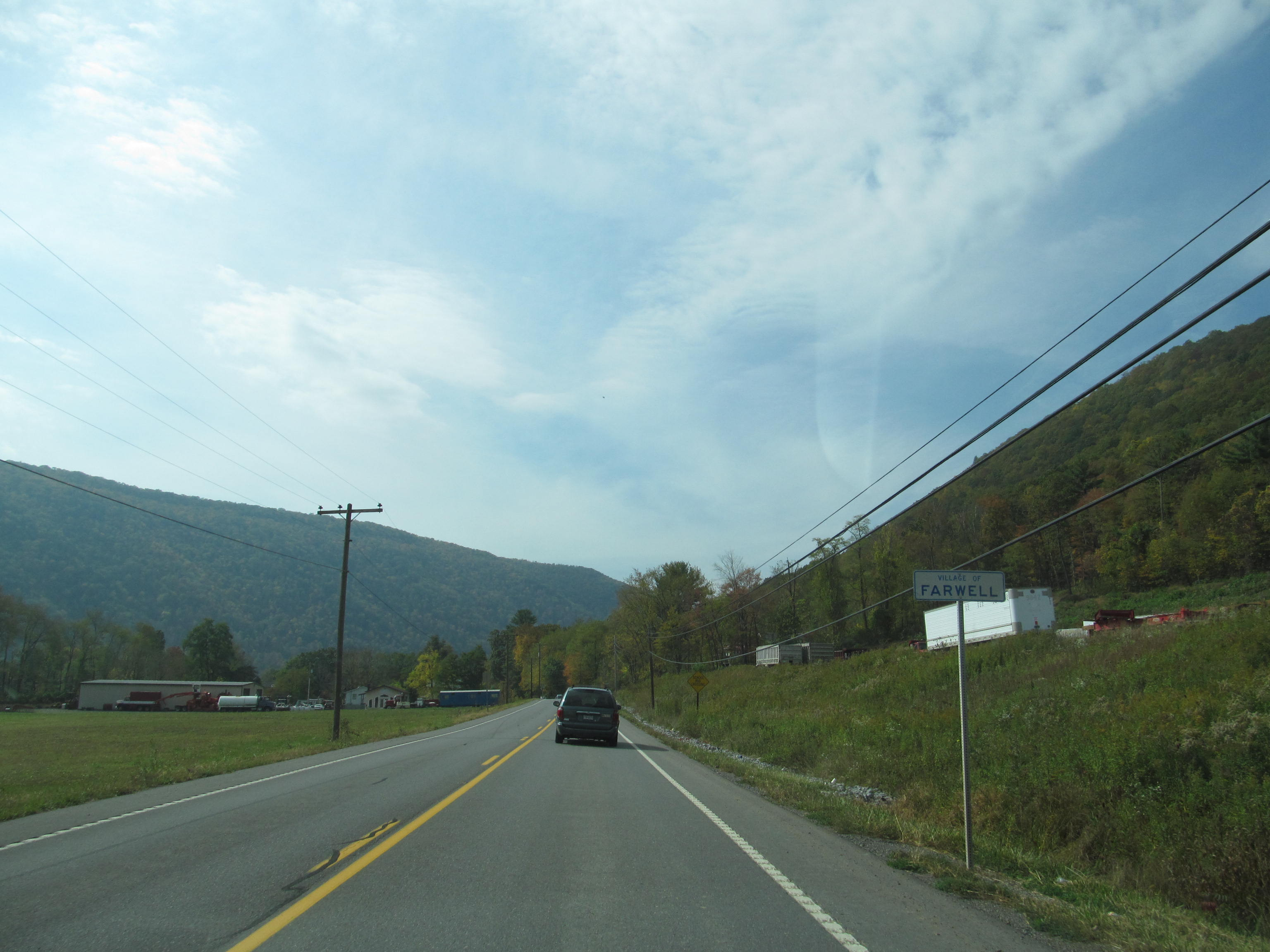
- PA 120 westbound entering Farwell

- Location within Pennsylvania Location within the United States
- Coordinates: 41°19′58″N 77°42′52″W
- Country: United States
- State: Pennsylvania
- County: Clinton
- Township: Chapman

Area
  - Total: 0.42 sq mi (1.09 km^{2})
  - Land: 0.37 sq mi (0.96 km^{2})
  - Water: 0.050 sq mi (0.13 km^{2})
- Elevation: 670 ft (200 m)

Population (2020)
  - Total: 244
  - Density: 658.0/sq mi (254.05/km^{2})
- Time zone: UTC-5 (Eastern (EST))
  - Summer (DST): UTC-4 (EDT)
- ZIP Code: 17764 (Renovo)
- Area codes: 570/272
- FIPS code: 42-25376
- GNIS feature ID: 2805495

Farwell is an unincorporated community and census-designated place (CDP) in Clinton County, Pennsylvania, United States. It was first listed as a CDP prior to the 2020 census.

The CDP is in northern Clinton County, in the southwestern part of Chapman Township. It is bordered to the west by the borough of Renovo and to the northeast by the CDP of North Bend, and it sits on the north bank of the West Branch Susquehanna River. 1,680-foot (510 m) Summerson Mountain rises 1,000 feet (300 m) directly above Farwell to the northwest.

Pennsylvania Route 120 runs through Farwell, leading west through Renovo 26 miles (42 km) to Sinnemahoning and southeastward through North Bend, the same distance to Lock Haven. Bucktail High School is located in Farwell.

== Demographics ==
Historical population
Census	Pop.	Note	%±
2020	244		—
U.S. Decennial Census
