= Cooks Run, Pennsylvania =

Unincorporated community in Pennsylvania, US

Coordinates: 41°16′51″N 77°52′34″W

Cooks Run is an unincorporated community within Noyes Township in Clinton County, Pennsylvania, United States.

Cooks Run was first settled around the time of the American Revolution or shortly after and was known for many years as McGinley's Bottom. At that time, Cooks Run was Pine Creek township, Northumberland county.

On November 3, 1888, a disaster occurred at the Kettle Creek Mine at Cooks Run, killing 17 people. The explosion was caused by a drill post falling on a supply of dynamite and caps that had just been brought into the mine. The explosion was propagated by coal dust throughout most of the mine and up the airshaft.

There is also a stream in Clinton County, Pennsylvania known as Cooks Run near Renovo. The stream used to be a popular place to fish, but has been polluted for decades. In 2017, Pennsylvania's Department of Environmental Protection announced a $7 million project that could potentially fix this problem.

The Cooks Run Restoration project has been a long-term effort to turn a surface mine back into a forest setting for humans and wildlife.
