= Chapman Township, Pennsylvania =

Chapman Township is the name of some places in the U.S. state of Pennsylvania:

- Chapman Township, Clinton County, Pennsylvania
- Chapman Township, Snyder County, Pennsylvania
