= Bucktail High School =

Location
- Renovo, Pennsylvania; United States
- Coordinates: 41.3364°N 77.7081°W

Information
- School type: Public, Secondary
- Opened: 1967
- School district: Keystone Central School District
- Superintendent: Francis Redmon
- Principal: James Poleto
- Dean of Students: Michael Poorman
- Faculty: 36
- Grades: 9 through 12
- Enrollment: 120 (2023-2024)
- Campus size: Small
- Campus type: Rural
- Colors: Cherry Red, White
- Sports: Baseball, Basketball, Football, Softball, Tennis
- Mascot: Bucktail Buck
- Team name: Bucktail Bucks, Lady Bucks
- Communities served: Renovo, Pennsylvania, North Bend, Pennsylvania
- Feeder schools: Renovo Elementary
- Graduates (2025): 24
- Website: bt.kcsd.us

Bucktail High School is a small rural high school located in Renovo, Pennsylvania. Bucktail High School is located at 1300 Bucktail Avenue, Renovo. In the 2021–2022 school year, enrollment was reported as 119 pupils in 9th through 12th grades. Bucktail High school shares its building with Bucktail Middle School, its feeder school. The school's first graduating class was 1960.
