= Clinton County, Pennsylvania =

County in Pennsylvania, United States

- County
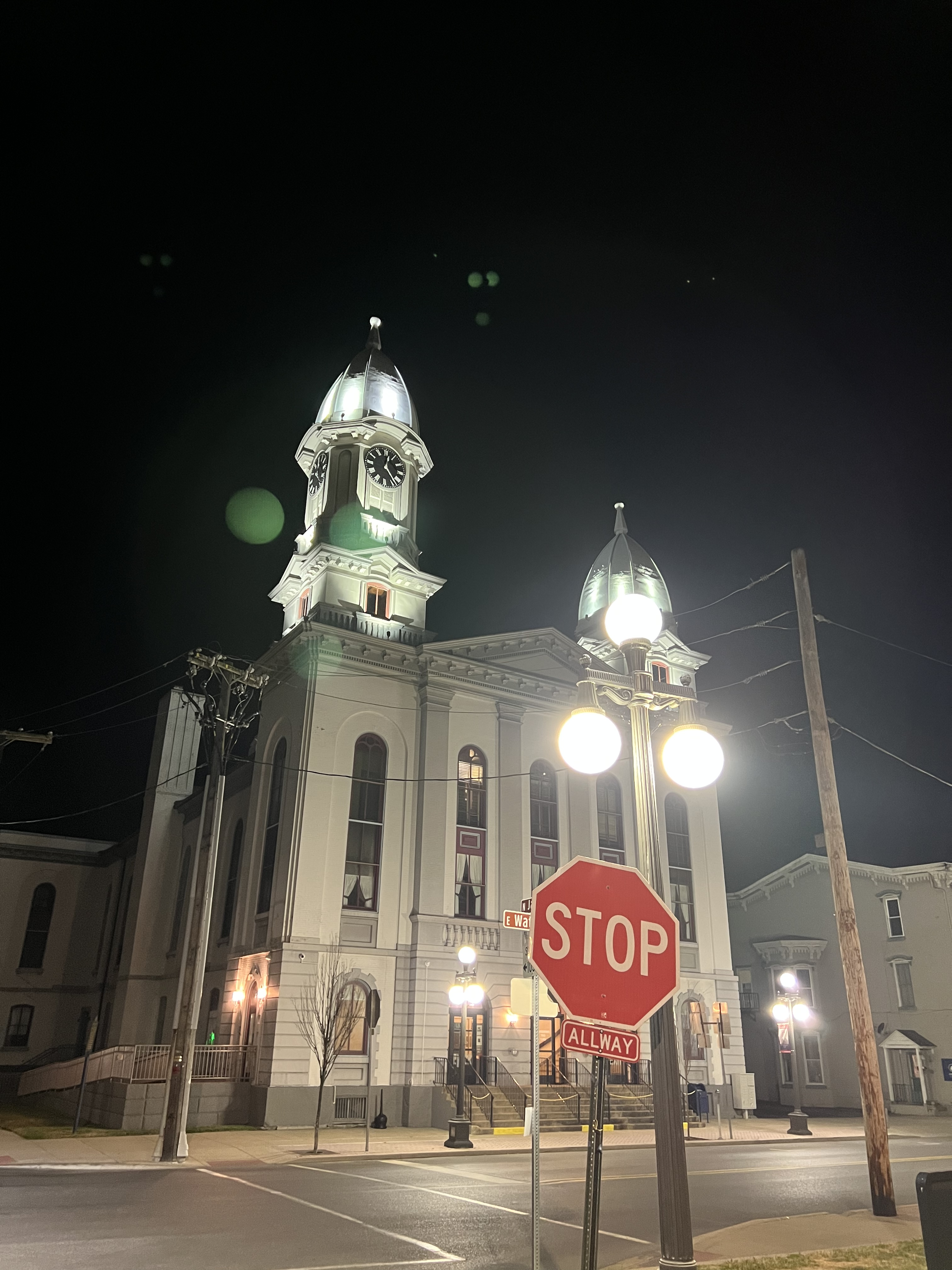
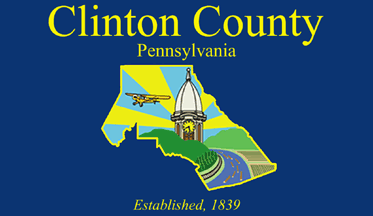
- Clinton County Courthouse Official seal De-facto seal Flag Logo
- Motto(s): Where Rivers and Valleys meet Mountains and Sunsets
- Location within the U.S. state of Pennsylvania
- Coordinates: 41°14′N 77°38′W
- Country: United States
- State: Pennsylvania
- Founded: June 21, 1839
- Named for: DeWitt Clinton
- Seat: Lock Haven
- Largest city: Lock Haven

Area
  - Total: 897 sq mi (2,320 km^{2})
  - Land: 888 sq mi (2,300 km^{2})
  - Water: 8.9 sq mi (23 km^{2}) 1.0%

Population (2020)
  - Total: 37,450
  - Estimate (2025): 37,870 ▲
  - Density: 42.6/sq mi (16.4/km^{2})
- Time zone: UTC−5 (Eastern)
  - Summer (DST): UTC−4 (EDT)
- Congressional district: 15th
- Website: www.clintoncountypa.gov

Pennsylvania Historical Marker
- Designated: June 12, 1982

Clinton County is a county in the Commonwealth of Pennsylvania. As of the 2020 census, the population was 37,450. Its county seat is Lock Haven. Clinton County comprises the Lock Haven, PA Micropolitan Statistical Area, which is also included in the Williamsport-Lock Haven, PA Combined Statistical Area. The county is part of the Central region of the commonwealth. (Note: Includes Centre, Lycoming, Northumberland, Columbia, Mifflin, Union, Snyder, Clinton, Juniata and Montour Counties)

== History ==
In the Treaty of Fort Stanwix of 1768, new lands in Pennsylvania were purchased from the Haudenosaunee for colonial settlement, including parts of what is now Clinton County. The land was formally associated with Northumberland County, but a group of organized settlers near modern Jersey Shore elected three commissioners each March who were responsible for seeing that everyone was dealt with fairly. This became known as the Fairplay System. Most of the rulings seem to have dealt with property issues, but they dealt with any legal or criminal cases in their area. They granted permission for new settlers to enter the area, could take away a settler's land claim if they were absent more than six weeks (except for military service), and could expel a person (by setting them adrift in a canoe on the river). The county was created on June 21, 1839, from parts of Centre and Lycoming Counties.

== Etymology ==
The county name is in honor of the sixth Governor of New York, DeWitt Clinton. Some alternate sources suggest the namesake is Henry Clinton.

== Geography ==
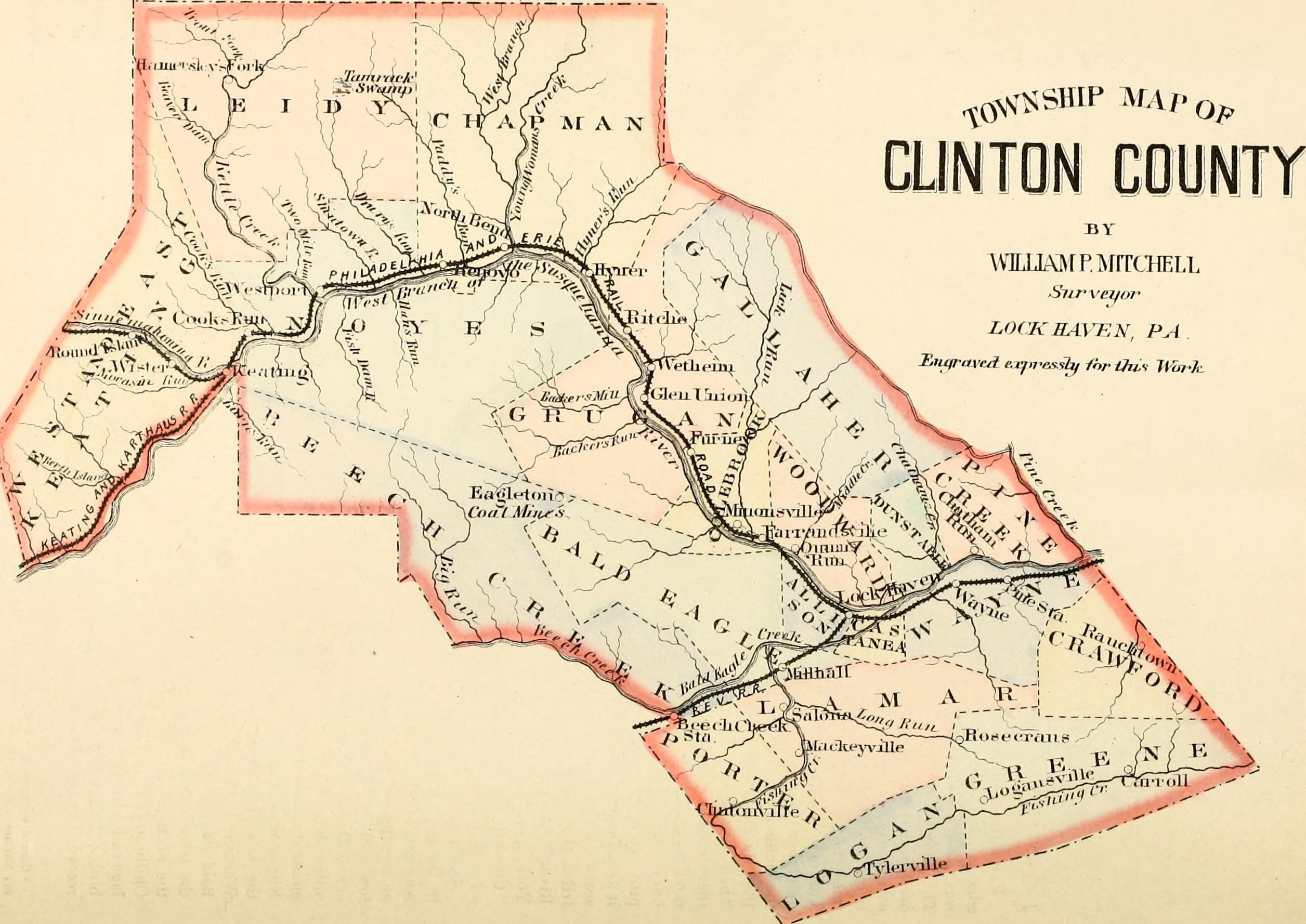
1883 map of Clinton County, with the Philadelphia and Erie Railroad running through the center.

According to the U.S. Census Bureau, the county has a total area of 897 square miles (2,320 km^{2}), of which 888 square miles (2,300 km^{2}) is land and 8.9 square miles (23 km^{2}) (1.0%) is water. The county has a humid continental climate which is warm-summer (Dfb) except in lower areas near the West Branch and the Bald Eagle Creek which are hot-summer (Dfa). Average monthly temperatures in Lock Haven range from 26.5 °F in January to 72.2 °F in July, while in Renovo they range from 25.6 °F in January to 71.0 °F in July.

=== Adjacent counties ===
Potter
		north
Cameron	west	self	east	Lycoming
Clearfield	southwest	south	southeast	Union
Centre

=== Landforms ===
- Bear Mountain - a USGS GNIS registered mountain peak (Bear Mountain: summit type feature at 41°00′34″N 077°26′02″W) on the "Mill Hall" topographic map

=== Major highways ===
- I-80
- Future I-99
- US 220
- PA 64
- PA 120
- PA 144
- PA 150
- PA 477
- PA 664
- PA 880

== Demographics ==
Historical population
Census	Pop.	Note	%±
1840	8,323		—
1850	11,207		34.7%
1860	17,723		58.1%
1870	23,211		31.0%
1880	26,278		13.2%
1890	28,685		9.2%
1900	29,197		1.8%
1910	31,545		8.0%
1920	33,555		6.4%
1930	32,319		−3.7%
1940	34,557		6.9%
1950	36,532		5.7%
1960	37,619		3.0%
1970	37,721		0.3%
1980	38,971		3.3%
1990	37,182		−4.6%
2000	37,914		2.0%
2010	39,238		3.5%
2020	37,450		−4.6%
2025 (est.)	37,870	▲	1.1%

=== Racial and ethnic composition ===
Clinton County, Pennsylvania – Racial and ethnic composition Note: the US Census treats Hispanic/Latino as an ethnic category. This table excludes Latinos from the racial categories and assigns them to a separate category. Hispanics/Latinos may be of any race.
Race / Ethnicity (NH = Non-Hispanic)	Pop 1980	Pop 1990	Pop 2000	Pop 2010	Pop 2020	% 1980	% 1990	% 2000	% 2010	% 2020
White alone (NH)	38,593	36,782	37,125	37,618	34,933	99.03%	98.92%	97.92%	95.87%	93.28%
Black or African American alone (NH)	126	143	189	612	416	0.32%	0.38%	0.50%	1.56%	1.11%
Native American or Alaska Native alone (NH)	26	49	42	29	51	0.07%	0.13%	0.11%	0.07%	0.14%
Asian alone (NH)	62	116	150	199	211	0.16%	0.31%	0.40%	0.51%	0.56%
Native Hawaiian or Pacific Islander alone (NH)	x	x	7	15	7	x	x	0.02%	0.04%	0.02%
Other race alone (NH)	25	1	14	18	70	0.06%	0.00%	0.04%	0.05%	0.19%
Mixed race or Multiracial (NH)	x	x	182	310	1,100	x	x	0.48%	0.79%	2.94%
Hispanic or Latino (any race)	139	91	205	437	662	0.36%	0.24%	0.54%	1.11%	1.77%
Total	38,971	37,182	37,914	39,238	37,450	100.00%	100.00%	100.00%	100.00%	100.00%

=== 2020 census ===
As of the 2020 census, the county had a population of 37,450, and the median age was 41.5 years; 21.0% of residents were under the age of 18 and 20.5% were 65 years of age or older. For every 100 females there were 96.9 males, and for every 100 females age 18 and over there were 95.3 males.

The racial makeup of the county was 93.9% White, 1.2% Black or African American, 0.2% American Indian and Alaska Native, 0.6% Asian, <0.1% Native Hawaiian and Pacific Islander, 0.7% from some other race, and 3.4% from two or more races, while Hispanic or Latino residents of any race comprised 1.8% of the population.

52.1% of residents lived in urban areas, while 47.9% lived in rural areas.

There were 15,199 households in the county, of which 26.6% had children under the age of 18 living in them. Of all households, 47.4% were married-couple households, 18.8% were households with a male householder and no spouse or partner present, and 25.4% were households with a female householder and no spouse or partner present. About 29.5% of all households were made up of individuals and 14.5% had someone living alone who was 65 years of age or older.

There were 18,603 housing units, of which 18.3% were vacant. Among occupied housing units, 70.6% were owner-occupied and 29.4% were renter-occupied. The homeowner vacancy rate was 2.2% and the rental vacancy rate was 9.5%.

=== 2000 census ===
As of the census of 2000, there were 37,914 people, 14,773 households, and 9,927 families residing in the county. The population density was 43 people per square mile (17 people/km^{2}). There were 18,166 housing units at an average density of 20 per square mile (7.7/km^{2}). The racial makeup of the county was 98.3% White, 0.52% Black or African American, 0.1% Native American, 0.4% Asian, <0.1% Pacific Islander, 0.2% from other races, and 0.5% from two or more races. 0.5% of the population were Hispanic or Latino of any race. 36.0% were of German, 15.6% American, 9.6% Irish, 8.6% Italian and 7.4% English ancestry.

There were 14,773 households, out of which 27.7% had children under the age of 18 living with them, 54.0% were married couples living together, 9.4% had a female householder with no husband present, and 32.8% were non-families. 26.6% of all households were made up of individuals, and 13.6% had someone living alone who was 65 years of age or older. The average household size was 2.42 and the average family size was 2.90.

In the county, the population was spread out, with 21.5% under the age of 18, 13.6% from 18 to 24, 25.5% from 25 to 44, 22.7% from 45 to 64, and 16.8% who were 65 years of age or older. The median age was 38 years. For every 100 females there were 94.20 males. For every 100 females age 18 and over, there were 91.20 males.

== Micropolitan Statistical Area ==
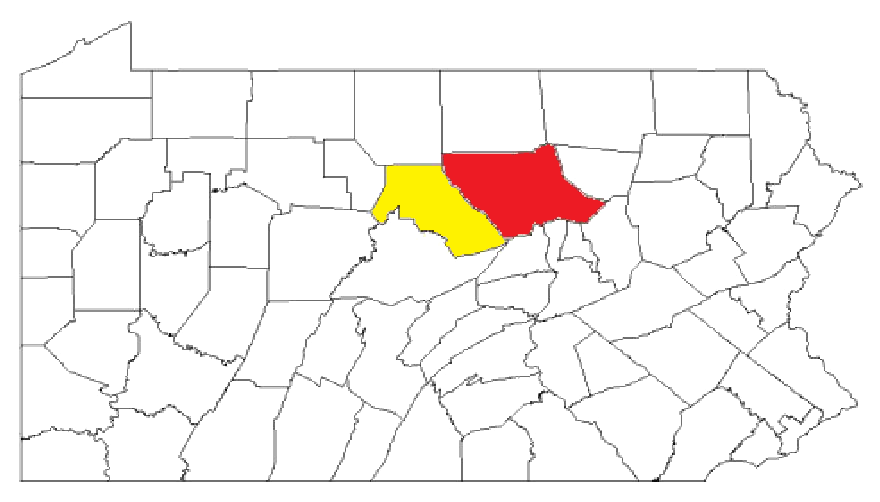
Map of the Williamsport-Lock Haven, PA Combined Statistical Area (CSA), composed of the following parts: Williamsport, PA Metropolitan Statistical Area Lock Haven, PA Micropolitan Statistical Area

The United States Office of Management and Budget has designated Clinton County as the Lock Haven, PA Micropolitan Statistical Area (μSA). As of the 2010 U.S. census the micropolitan area ranked 16th most populous in the State of Pennsylvania and the 315th most populous in the United States with a population of 39,238. Clinton County is also a part of the Williamsport-Lock Haven, PA Combined Statistical Area (CSA), which combines the population of both Clinton County and the Lycoming County areas. The Combined Statistical Area ranked 11th in the State of Pennsylvania and 143rd most populous in the United States with a population of 155,349.

== Government and politics ==
United States presidential election results for Clinton County, Pennsylvania
Year	Republican		Democratic		Third party(ies)	
Year	No.	%	No.	%	No.	%
1888	2,756	45.38%	3,204	52.76%	113	1.86%
1892	2,572	43.91%	3,075	52.49%	211	3.60%
1896	3,486	51.23%	3,053	44.87%	265	3.89%
1900	3,157	50.58%	2,879	46.13%	205	3.28%
1904	3,535	61.36%	1,941	33.69%	285	4.95%
1908	3,477	54.54%	2,547	39.95%	351	5.51%
1912	1,214	20.12%	2,200	36.45%	2,621	43.43%
1916	2,794	45.14%	2,967	47.93%	429	6.93%
1920	4,303	54.58%	2,976	37.75%	605	7.67%
1924	5,129	54.62%	1,939	20.65%	2,323	24.74%
1928	8,120	73.62%	2,849	25.83%	60	0.54%
1932	4,851	54.54%	3,741	42.06%	302	3.40%
1936	6,479	43.28%	8,351	55.79%	139	0.93%
1940	6,291	45.80%	7,419	54.01%	26	0.19%
1944	5,915	50.66%	5,703	48.85%	57	0.49%
1948	5,618	52.85%	5,013	47.15%	0	0.00%
1952	8,125	58.29%	5,758	41.31%	55	0.39%
1956	8,250	60.32%	5,411	39.56%	17	0.12%
1960	9,184	60.58%	5,965	39.34%	12	0.08%
1964	4,298	29.91%	10,038	69.84%	36	0.25%
1968	6,563	48.59%	6,301	46.65%	644	4.77%
1972	8,205	62.54%	4,772	36.37%	142	1.08%
1976	5,858	46.63%	6,532	51.99%	174	1.38%
1980	6,288	52.36%	4,842	40.32%	880	7.33%
1984	6,678	59.24%	4,525	40.14%	70	0.62%
1988	5,735	49.38%	5,759	49.59%	119	1.02%
1992	4,471	35.57%	5,397	42.94%	2,701	21.49%
1996	4,293	37.39%	5,658	49.27%	1,532	13.34%
2000	6,064	50.56%	5,521	46.03%	409	3.41%
2004	8,035	57.53%	5,823	41.69%	109	0.78%
2008	7,504	50.73%	7,097	47.98%	190	1.28%
2012	7,303	54.86%	5,734	43.08%	274	2.06%
2016	10,022	64.64%	4,744	30.60%	739	4.77%
2020	11,902	67.39%	5,502	31.15%	257	1.46%
2024	12,965	69.83%	5,395	29.06%	207	1.11%

United States Senate election results for Clinton County, Pennsylvania1
Year	Republican		Democratic		Third party(ies)	
Year	No.	%	No.	%	No.	%
1994	4,545	47.51%	4,688	49.01%	333	3.48%
2000	6,710	59.23%	4,333	38.25%	285	2.52%
2006	4,491	45.93%	5,287	54.07%	0	0.00%
2012	7,020	53.29%	5,857	44.47%	295	2.24%
2018	6,869	55.49%	5,289	42.73%	220	1.78%
2024	12,250	66.40%	5,722	31.02%	476	2.58%

United States Senate election results for Clinton County, Pennsylvania3
Year	Republican		Democratic		Third party(ies)	
Year	No.	%	No.	%	No.	%
1992	5,151	41.95%	6,025	49.07%	1,102	8.98%
1998	5,100	61.81%	2,837	34.38%	314	3.81%
2004	7,923	59.49%	4,602	34.55%	794	5.96%
2010	5,409	58.69%	3,807	41.31%	0	0.00%
2016	8,702	57.38%	5,511	36.34%	952	6.28%
2022	8,791	62.72%	4,750	33.89%	476	3.40%

Pennsylvania Gubernatorial election results for Clinton County
Year	Republican		Democratic		Third party(ies)	
Year	No.	%	No.	%	No.	%
1970	4,349	39.20%	6,534	58.90%	210	1.89%
1974	4,350	43.59%	5,554	55.66%	75	0.75%
1978	5,563	59.26%	3,703	39.45%	121	1.29%
1982	4,227	42.50%	5,629	56.60%	89	0.89%
1986	4,196	48.49%	4,373	50.53%	85	0.98%
1990	2,832	29.41%	6,796	70.59%	0	0.00%
1994	4,895	49.82%	4,084	41.56%	847	8.62%
1998	5,348	62.28%	2,656	30.93%	583	6.79%
2002	4,434	48.81%	4,341	47.79%	309	3.40%
2006	4,341	44.27%	5,464	55.73%	0	0.00%
2010	5,676	61.03%	3,625	38.97%	0	0.00%
2014	3,929	46.16%	4,583	53.84%	0	0.00%
2018	6,727	53.92%	5,517	44.22%	232	1.86%
2022	8,512	60.48%	5,293	37.61%	268	1.90%

Clinton County has historically been Republican like the rest of central Pennsylvania, Democrats captured the registration edge in early 2008. Each of the three row-office statewide winners carried Clinton in 2008. In 2006, Democrat Bob Casey Jr. received 54% of its vote when he unseated incumbent Republican US Senator Rick Santorum and Ed Rendell received 56% of the vote against Lynn Swann. The conservative tendencies of the county were again reestablished in 2008 when then-Senator Obama lost the county vote 48% to John McCain's 51%. This was followed in 2010 with U.S. Senate candidate, Republican Pat Toomey, receiving 59% to 41% for Democrat Joe Sestak. In 2012, Mitt Romney carried the county 55% to President Obama's 43%, while incumbent Democratic Senator Bob Casey, Jr. received 44% to his Republican challenger, Tom Smith's 53%.

=== Voter registration ===
As of February 6, 2024, there are 21,710 registered voters in Clinton County.

- Republican: 12,411 (57.17%)
- Democratic: 6,497 (29.93%)
- Independent: 2,015 (9.28%)
- Third Party: 787 (3.63%)
Chart of Voter Registration
1. Republican (57.2%)
2. Democratic (29.9%)
3. Independent (9.28%)
4. Other Parties (3.63%)

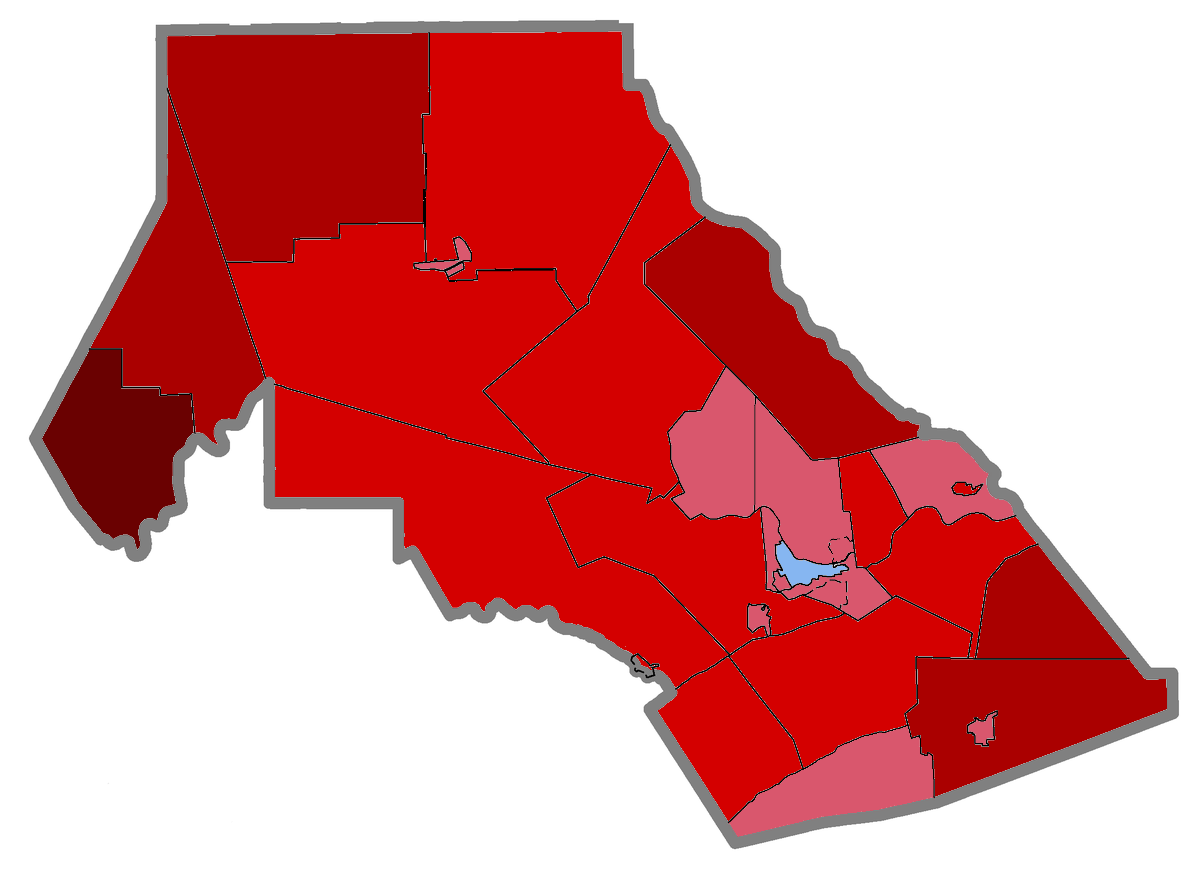
Presidential results of 2020 for Clinton County, Pennsylvania; municipalities separated by color Biden: 50–60% Trump: 60–70% 70–80% 80–90% >90%

=== County commissioners ===
- Jim Russo, chairman, Republican
- Jeffrey Snyder, vice chairman, Republican
- Angela Harding, Democrat

=== Other county offices ===
- Chief Clerk, Desiree Meyers
- Clerk of Courts and Prothonotary, Cynthia Love, Republican
- District Attorney, David Strouse, Democrat
- Register of Wills, Jennifer Hoy, Republican
- Treasurer, Michelle Kunes, Republican
- Auditor, Jacqui Anastos, Republican
- Auditor, Michelle Crowell, Democrat
- Auditor, Cathy Gedon, Republican
- Sheriff, Kerry Stover, Democrat
- Coroner Zach Hanna, Democrat

=== State senate ===
District	Senator	Party
25	Cris Dush	Republican

=== State House of Representatives ===
District	Representative	Party
76	Stephanie Borowicz	Republican

=== United States House of Representatives ===
District	Representative	Party
15	Glenn Thompson	Republican

=== United States Senate ===
Senator	Party
John Fetterman	Democratic
Dave McCormick	Republican

== Education ==
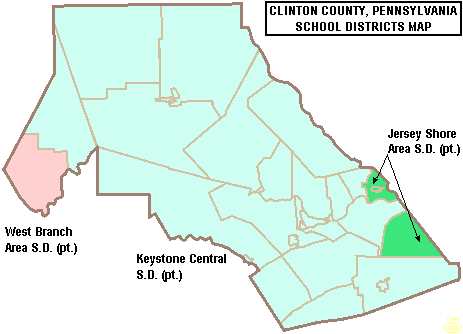
Map of Clinton County, Pennsylvania Public School Districts

=== Colleges and universities ===
- Lock Haven University of Pennsylvania

=== Public school districts ===
- Jersey Shore Area School District (also in Lycoming County)
- Keystone Central School District (also in Centre County)
- West Branch Area School District (also in Clearfield County)

== Recreation ==
There are five Pennsylvania state parks in Clinton County.

- Bucktail State Park Natural Area is a 75-mile (121 km) scenic route along Pennsylvania Route 120 stretching from Lock Haven to Emporium in Cameron County.
- Hyner Run State Park
- Hyner View State Park
- Kettle Creek State Park
- Ravensburg State Park

== Communities ==
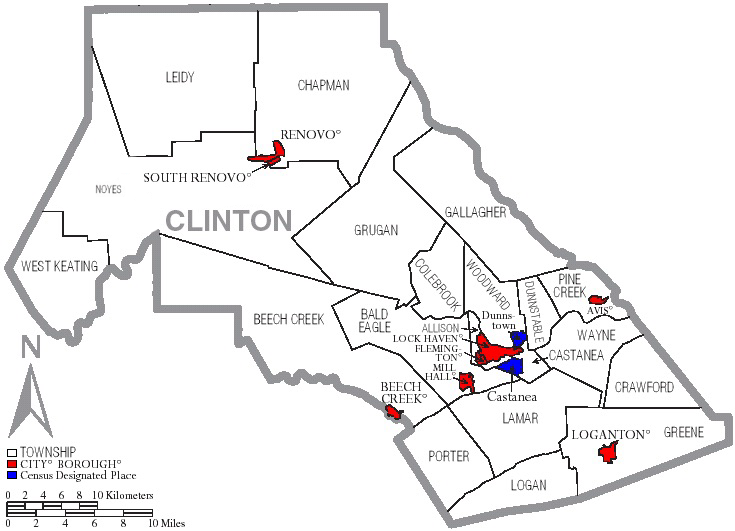
Map of Clinton County, Pennsylvania with Municipal Labels showing Cities and Boroughs (red), Townships (white), and Census-designated places (blue).

Under Pennsylvania law, there are four types of incorporated municipalities: cities, boroughs, townships, and, in at most two cases, towns. The following cities, boroughs and townships are located in Clinton County:

=== City ===
- Lock Haven (county seat)

=== Boroughs ===
- Avis
- Beech Creek
- Flemington
- Loganton
- Mill Hall
- Renovo
- South Renovo

=== Townships ===
- Allison
- Bald Eagle
- Beech Creek
- Castanea
- Chapman
- Colebrook
- Crawford
- Dunnstable
- Gallagher
- Greene
- Grugan
- Lamar
- Leidy
- Logan
- Noyes
- Pine Creek
- Porter
- Wayne
- West Keating
- Woodward

==== Former townships ====
- East Keating

=== Census-designated places ===
Census-designated places are unincorporated communities designated by the U.S. Census Bureau for the purposes of compiling demographic data. They are not actual jurisdictions under Pennsylvania law.

- Castanea
- Clintondale
- Dunnstown
- Farwell
- Lamar
- McElhattan
- North Bend
- Rauchtown
- Rote
- Salona
- Tylersville
- Woolrich

=== Other unincorporated communities ===
- Cooks Run
- Farrandsville
- Hyner
- Keating
- Mackeyville
- Westport

=== Population ranking ===
The population ranking of the following table is based on the 2020 census of Clinton County.

† county seat

Rank	City/Town/etc.	Municipal type	Population (2020 Census)
1	† Lock Haven	City	8,108
2	Mill Hall	Borough	1,479
3	Avis	Borough	1,473
4	Dunnstown	CDP	1,464
5	Flemington	Borough	1,271
6	McElhattan	CDP	1,224
7	Renovo	Borough	1,061
8	Castanea	CDP	1,047
9	Beech Creek	Borough	736
10	Rauchtown (partially in Lycoming County)	CDP	722
11	Lamar	CDP	561
12	Rote	CDP	488
13	Loganton	Borough	469
14	South Renovo	Borough	411

== See also ==
- National Register of Historic Places listings in Clinton County, Pennsylvania
- Project Ketch
