= Grugan Township, Pennsylvania =

Township in Pennsylvania, US

Coordinates: 41°23′00″N 77°32′59″W

- Township
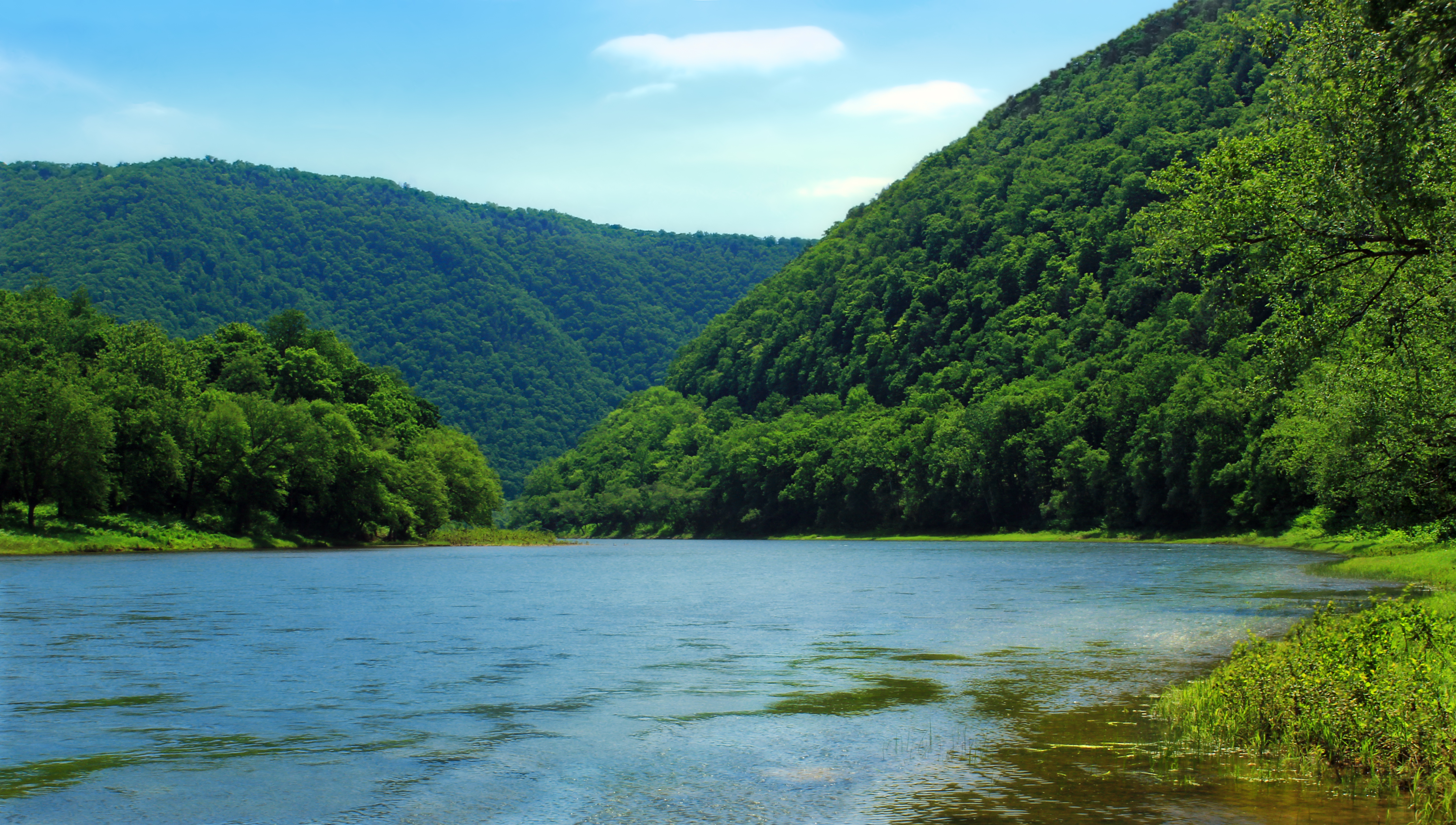
- West Branch Susquehanna River in Grugan Township

- Location in Clinton County and the state of Pennsylvania.
- Country: United States
- State: Pennsylvania
- County: Clinton
- Settled: 1785
- Incorporated: 1851

Area
  - Total: 69.38 sq mi (179.69 km^{2})
  - Land: 68.27 sq mi (176.82 km^{2})
  - Water: 1.11 sq mi (2.88 km^{2})

Population (2020)
  - Total: 48 ▼
  - Estimate (2021): 48
  - Density: 0.75/sq mi (0.29/km^{2})
- FIPS code: 42-035-31680

Grugan Township is a township in Clinton County, Pennsylvania, United States. The population was 48 at the 2020 census.

== History ==
The township was formed in 1851, and was taken from territory in Colebrook Township and Chapman Township. The township is divided into two nearly equal parts by the West Branch Susquehanna River. The township is named for the descendants of Charles Grogan, later written as "Grugan", an Irish immigrant and American Revolutionary War veteran from Lancaster County. Grogan froze to death in the Buffalo Valley Region during the winter of 1790–1791, and his sons, James and Alexander Grugan, later reared large families in what became Grugan Township. The earliest known settlers of the region were John Baker Atkin and James Burney. The first school in Grugan Township was opened in 1830.

== Geography ==
According to the United States Census Bureau, the township has a total area of 9.9 square miles (179/7 km^{2}), of which 68.3 square miles (176.8 km^{2}) is land and 1.1 square miles (2.9 km^{2}), or 1.60%, is water.

== Demographics ==
Historical population
Census	Pop.	Note	%±
1980	46		—
1990	52		13.0%
2000	52		0.0%
2010	51		−1.9%
2020	48		−5.9%
2021 (est.)	48		0.0%

As of the census of 2000, there were 52 people, 26 households, and 17 families residing in the township. The population density was 0.8 people per square mile (0.3/km^{2}). There were 144 housing units at an average density of 2.1/sq mi (0.8/km^{2}). The racial makeup of the township was 98.08% White and 1.92% Native American.

There were 26 households, out of which 7.7% had children under the age of 18 living with them, 65.4% were married couples living together, and 34.6% were non-families. 34.6% of all households were made up of individuals, and 15.4% had someone living alone who was 65 years of age or older. The average household size was 2.00 and the average family size was 2.53.

In the township the population was spread out, with 11.5% under the age of 18, 19.2% from 25 to 44, 44.2% from 45 to 64, and 25.0% who were 65 years of age or older. The median age was 56 years. For every 100 females, there were 108.0 males. For every 100 females age 18 and over, there were 119.0 males.

The median income for a household in the township was $35,625, with the median income for a family was $37,500. Males had a median income of $38,750 versus $0 for females. The per capita income for the township was $20,086. There were no families and 5.6% of the population living below the poverty line, including no under eighteens and none of those over 64.
