= Noyes Township, Pennsylvania =

Township in Pennsylvania, US

Coordinates: 41°14′59″N 77°47′29″W

- Township
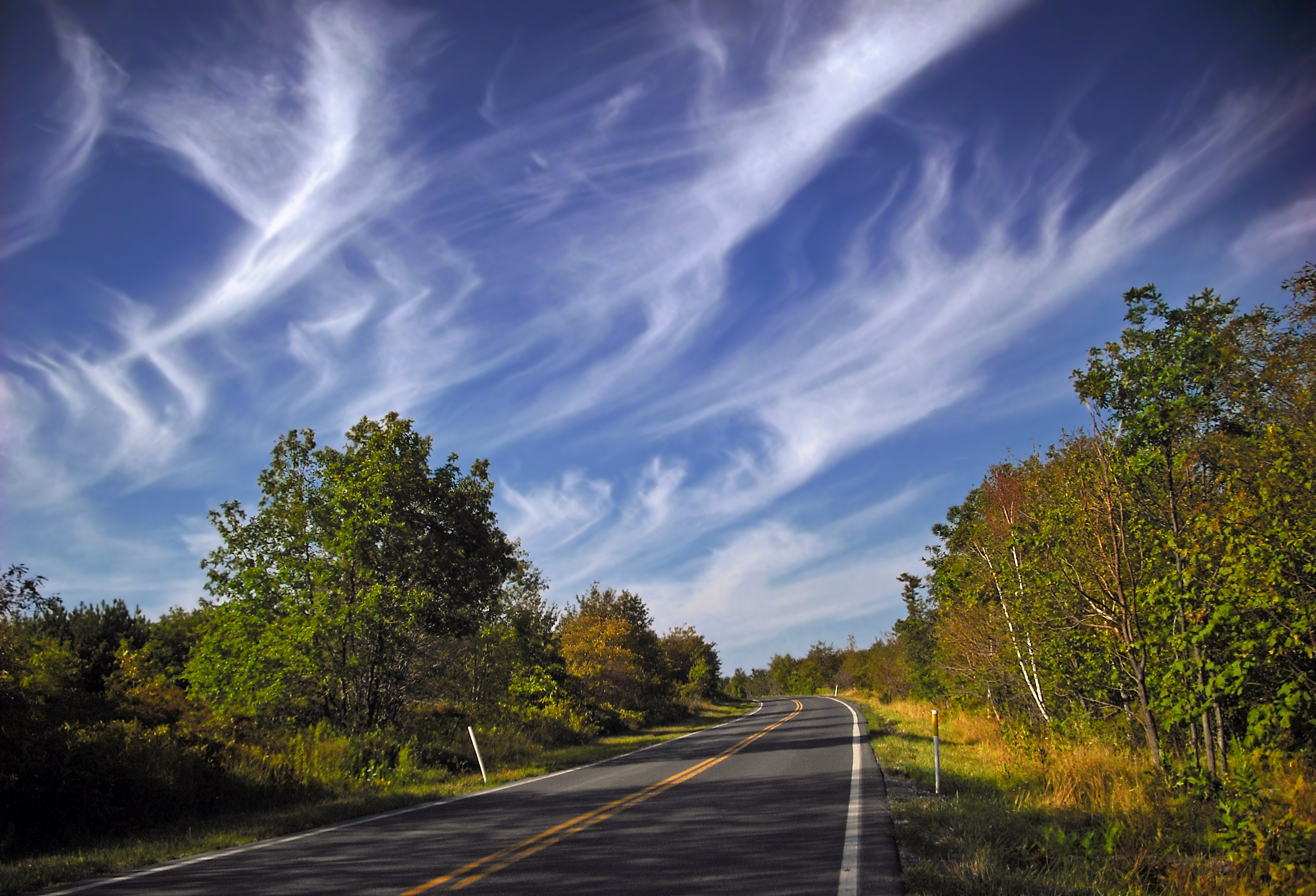
- Pennsylvania Route 144 passes through Noyes Township.

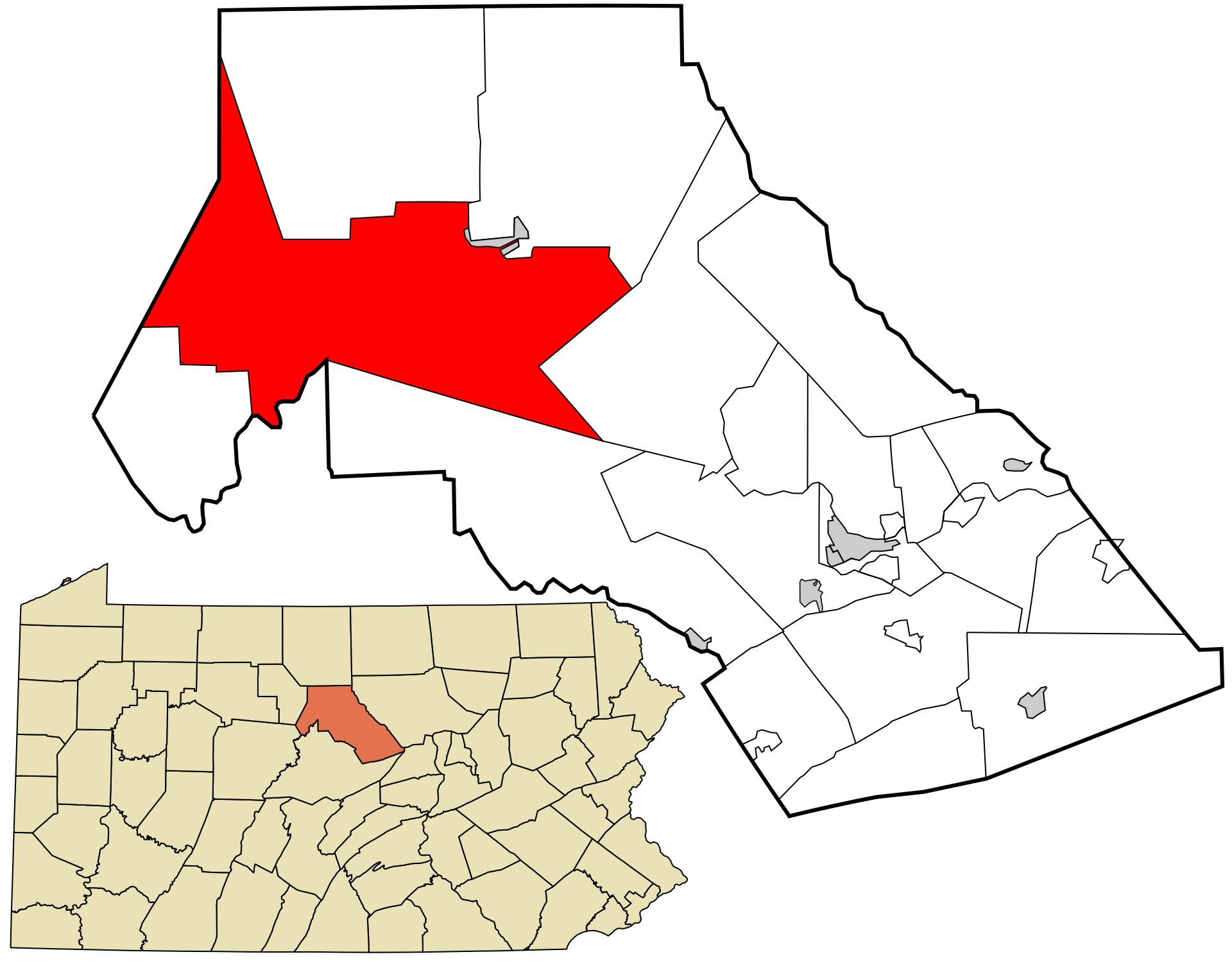
- Location in Clinton County and the state of Pennsylvania.
- Country: United States
- State: Pennsylvania
- County: Clinton
- Settled: 1775
- Incorporated: 1875

Area
  - Total: 89.97 sq mi (233.02 km^{2})
  - Land: 88.81 sq mi (230.02 km^{2})
  - Water: 1.16 sq mi (3.00 km^{2})

Population (2020)
  - Total: 333 ▼
  - Estimate (2021): 333
  - Density: 4.0/sq mi (1.55/km^{2})
- FIPS code: 42-035-55744
- Website: https://noyestownship.com/

Noyes Township is a township that is located in Clinton County, Pennsylvania, United States. The population was 333 at the time of the 2020 census, a decline from the total of 357 that was counted in 2010.

== History ==
Noyes Township was cut off and formed from Chapman Township in 1875, and was named in honor of Colonel A. C. Noyes, the most prominent citizen residing within the limits of the area. The first settlement in the territory was made around the time of the American Revolution, or shortly after, on the lower, north side and near the mouth of Kettle Creek.

In 2025, East Keating Township merged into Noyes Township.

== Geography ==
According to the United States Census Bureau, the township has a total area of 90.0 square miles (233.0 km^{2}), of which 88.8 square miles (230.0 km^{2}) is land and 1.2 square miles (3.0 km^{2}), or 1.29%, is water.

== Demographics ==
Historical population
Census	Pop.	Note	%±
1980	631		—
1990	463		−26.6%
2000	419		−9.5%
2010	357		−14.8%
2020	333		−6.7%
2021 (est.)	333		0.0%

As of the census of 2000, there were 419 people, 186 households, and 127 families residing in the township.

The population density was 4.7 people per square mile (1.8/km^{2}). There were 368 housing units at an average density of 4.1/sq mi (1.6/km^{2}).

The racial makeup of the township was 99.52% White and 0.48% Native American.

There were 186 households, out of which 19.9% had children under the age of eighteen living with them; 54.8% were married couples living together, 8.1% had a female householder with no husband present, and 31.2% were non-families. 29.6% of all households were made up of individuals, and 14.5% had someone living alone who was sixty-five years of age or older.

The average household size was 2.25 and the average family size was 2.75.

Within the township, the population was spread out, with 18.1% of residents who were under the age of eighteen, 4.1% who were aged eighteen to twenty-four, 19.6% who were aged twenty-five to forty-four, 32.2% who were aged forty-five to sixty-four, and 26.0% who were sixty-five years of age or older. The median age was forty-nine years.

For every one hundred females, there were 98.6 males. For every one hundred females who were aged eighteen or older, there were 101.8 males.

The median income for a household in the township was $28,036, and the median income for a family was $34,318. Males had a median income of $33,438 compared with that of $22,917 for females.

The per capita income for the township was $17,094.

Approximately 13.3% of families and 15.7% of the population were living below the poverty line, including 22.4% of those who were under the age of eighteen and 16.0% of those who were aged sixty-five or older.
