= North Bend, Pennsylvania =

Unincorporated community in Pennsylvania, US

- Unincorporated community
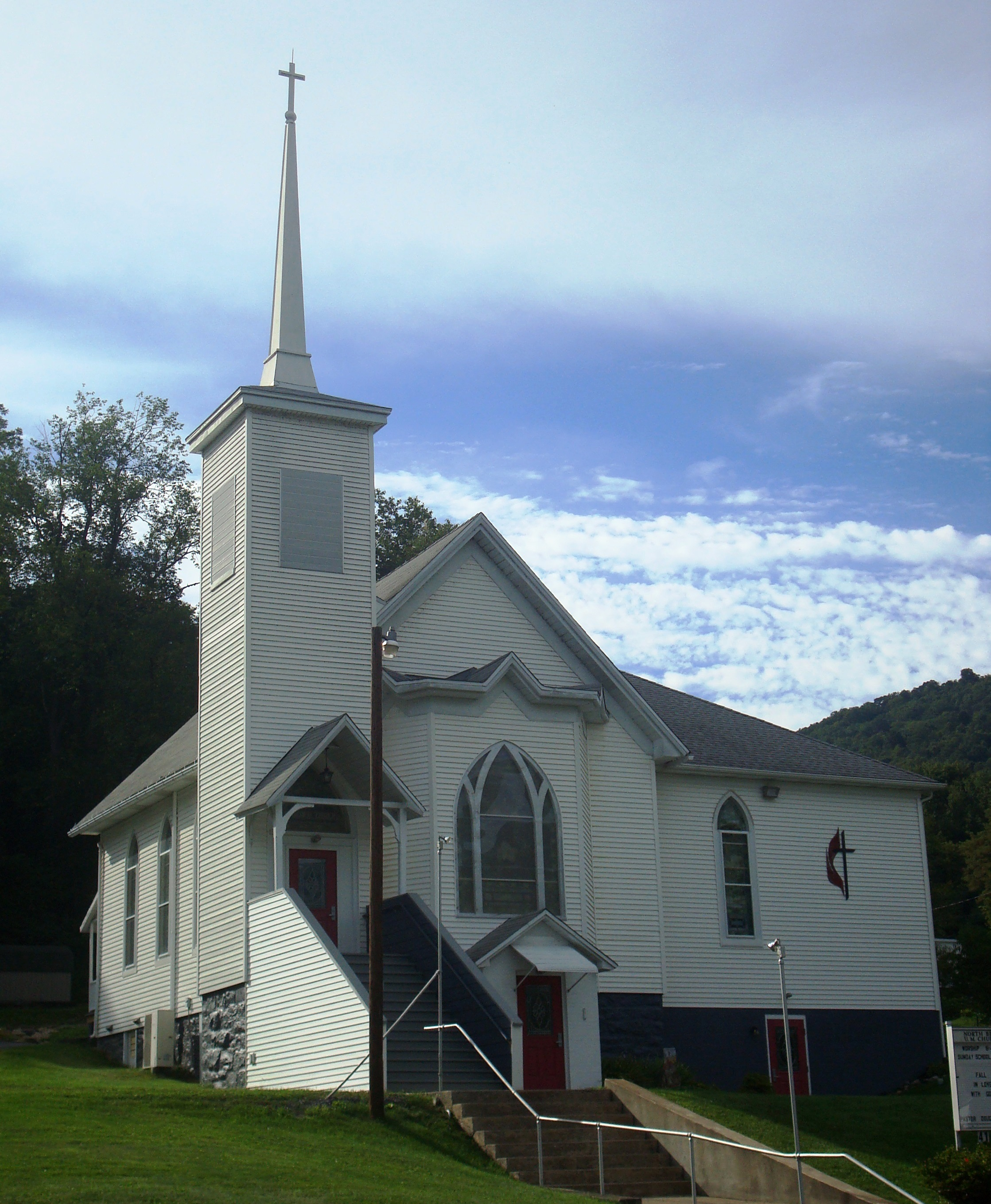
- North Bend United Methodist Church

- Location within Pennsylvania
- Coordinates: 41°21′00″N 77°42′08″W
- Country: United States
- State: Pennsylvania
- County: Clinton
- Township: Chapman

Area
  - Total: 0.63 sq mi (1.64 km^{2})
  - Land: 0.59 sq mi (1.54 km^{2})
  - Water: 0.039 sq mi (0.10 km^{2})
- Elevation: 673 ft (205 m)

Population (2020)
  - Total: 323
  - Density: 543.6/sq mi (209.89/km^{2})
- Time zone: UTC-5 (Eastern (EST))
  - Summer (DST): UTC-4 (EDT)
- ZIP code: 17760
- Area codes: 272 & 570
- GNIS feature ID: 1204297

North Bend is an unincorporated community in Clinton County, Pennsylvania, United States. The community is located along the West Branch Susquehanna River and Pennsylvania Route 120, 3 miles (4.8 km) east-northeast of Renovo. North Bend has a post office with ZIP code 17760.

== Demographics ==
Historical population
Census	Pop.	Note	%±
2020	323		—
U.S. Decennial Census
