= South Renovo, Pennsylvania =

Borough in Pennsylvania, US

- Borough
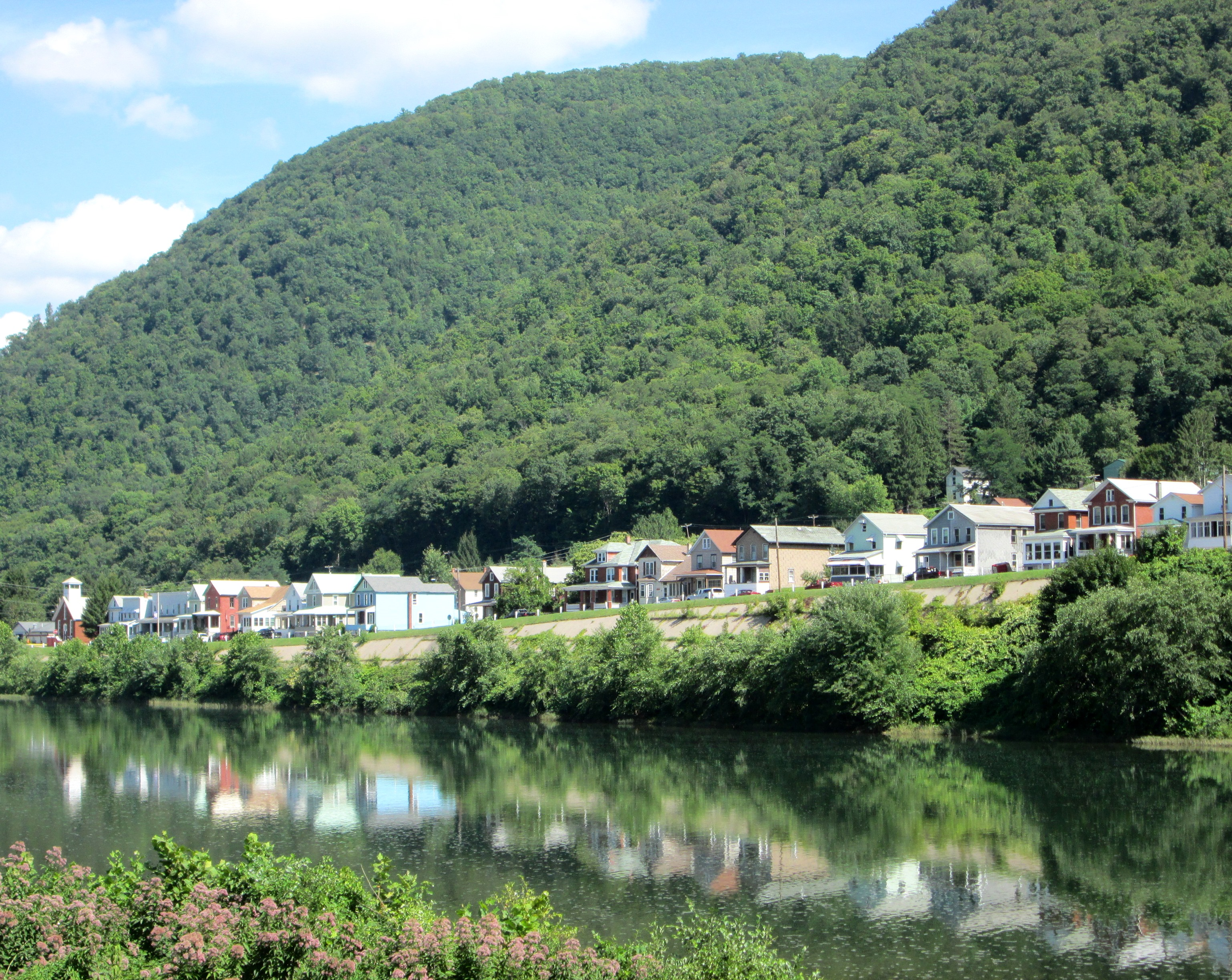
- South Renovo and the West Branch Susquehanna River

- Location in Clinton County and the U.S. state of Pennsylvania.
- Coordinates: 41°19′23″N 77°44′53″W
- Country: United States
- State: Pennsylvania
- County: Clinton
- Settled: 1881
- Incorporated (borough): 1888

Government
  - Type: Borough Council
  - Mayor: Matthew Carter

Area
  - Total: 0.23 sq mi (0.60 km^{2})
  - Land: 0.20 sq mi (0.53 km^{2})
  - Water: 0.031 sq mi (0.08 km^{2})
- Elevation: 700 ft (210 m)

Population (2010)
  - Total: 439
  - Estimate (2019): 426
  - Density: 2,090.1/sq mi (806.99/km^{2})
- Time zone: Eastern (EST)
  - Summer (DST): EDT
- ZIP code: 17764
- Area code: 570
- FIPS code: 42-72448

South Renovo is a borough in Clinton County, Pennsylvania, United States, located on the West Branch Susquehanna River, directly across from Renovo. As of the 2020 census, South Renovo had a population of 411.

Historically, the economy of the area was based on lumbering, but when the mountains of the region had been stripped of their first-growth forest, the industry collapsed. There are also deposits of bituminous coal and fire clay in the region.

Today, the area largely consists of state land in the form of state forests, state parks and game lands. The region is known as the Pennsylvania Wilds.

== Geography ==
South Renovo is located in north-central Clinton County at 41°19′28″N 77°44′40″W (41.324405, -77.744307), on the south bank of the West Branch Susquehanna River. It is bordered by the borough of Renovo on the north bank. According to the United States Census Bureau, South Renovo has a total area of 0.23 square miles (0.60 km^{2}), of which 0.20 square miles (0.53 km^{2}) is land and 0.03 square miles (0.08 km^{2}), or 12.60%, is water.

Pennsylvania Route 144 passes through the borough, crossing the West Branch into Renovo to the north, and leading south 34 miles (55 km) to Snow Shoe and Interstate 80.

Historical population
Census	Pop.	Note	%±
1890	135		—
1900	425		214.8%
1910	805		89.4%
1920	1,291		60.4%
1930	1,054		−18.4%
1940	1,018		−3.4%
1950	862		−15.3%
1960	777		−9.9%
1970	662		−14.8%
1980	663		0.2%
1990	579		−12.7%
2000	557		−3.8%
2010	439		−21.2%
2019 (est.)	426		−3.0%

== Demographics ==
As of the census of 2000, there were 557 people, 226 households, and 141 families residing in the borough. The population density was 2,824.2 inhabitants per square mile (1,090.4/km^{2}). There were 261 housing units at an average density of 1,323.4 per square mile (511.0/km^{2}). The racial makeup of the borough was 99.82% White and 0.18% Native American.

There were 226 households, out of which 29.2% had children under the age of 18 living with them, 46.9% were married couples living together, 10.6% had a female householder with no husband present, and 37.6% were non-families. 35.8% of all households were made up of individuals, and 24.3% had someone living alone who was 65 years of age or older. The average household size was 2.28 and the average family size was 2.92.

In the borough the population was spread out, with 22.3% under the age of 18, 5.6% from 18 to 24, 22.1% from 25 to 44, 22.4% from 45 to 64, and 27.6% who were 65 years of age or older. The median age was 45 years. For every 100 females, there were 88.2 males. For every 100 females age 18 and over, there were 83.5 males.

The median income for a household in the borough was $24,853, and the median income for a family was $34,625. Males had a median income of $30,455 versus $17,639 for females. The per capita income for the borough was $14,751. About 6.8% of families and 10.4% of the population were below the poverty line, including 16.0% of those under age 18 and 8.9% of those age 65 or over.

== Points of interest ==
South Renovo is in the heart of the Pennsylvania Wilds which comprises twelve and a half counties (Warren, McKean, Potter, Tioga, Forest, Elk, Cameron, Clinton, Lycoming, Clarion, Jefferson, Clearfield and part of Centre) located in north-central Pennsylvania. This area contains over two million acres of remote, mountainous, and pristine lands located on state forest lands, state game lands, state park lands and public grounds that offer a wide variety of recreational opportunities. The Wilds has within it 29 state parks, 8 state forests, 50 state game lands, abundant wildlife, several natural/wild areas, and miles of hiking trails and fishing streams. The region also contains the largest elk herd in the Northeast, stretching as far west as Ridgway and as far east as Renovo.

== Gallery ==
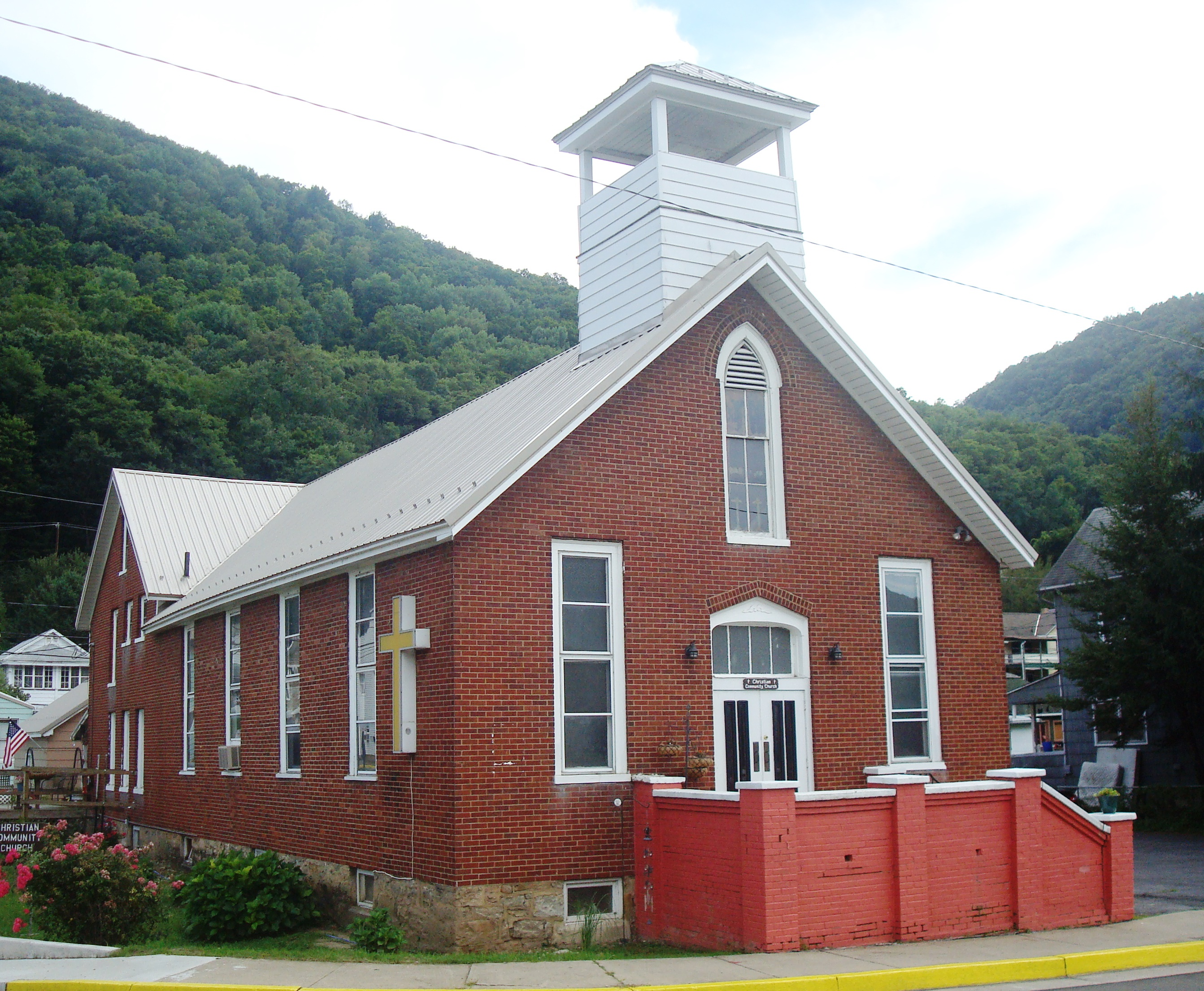
Christian Community Church

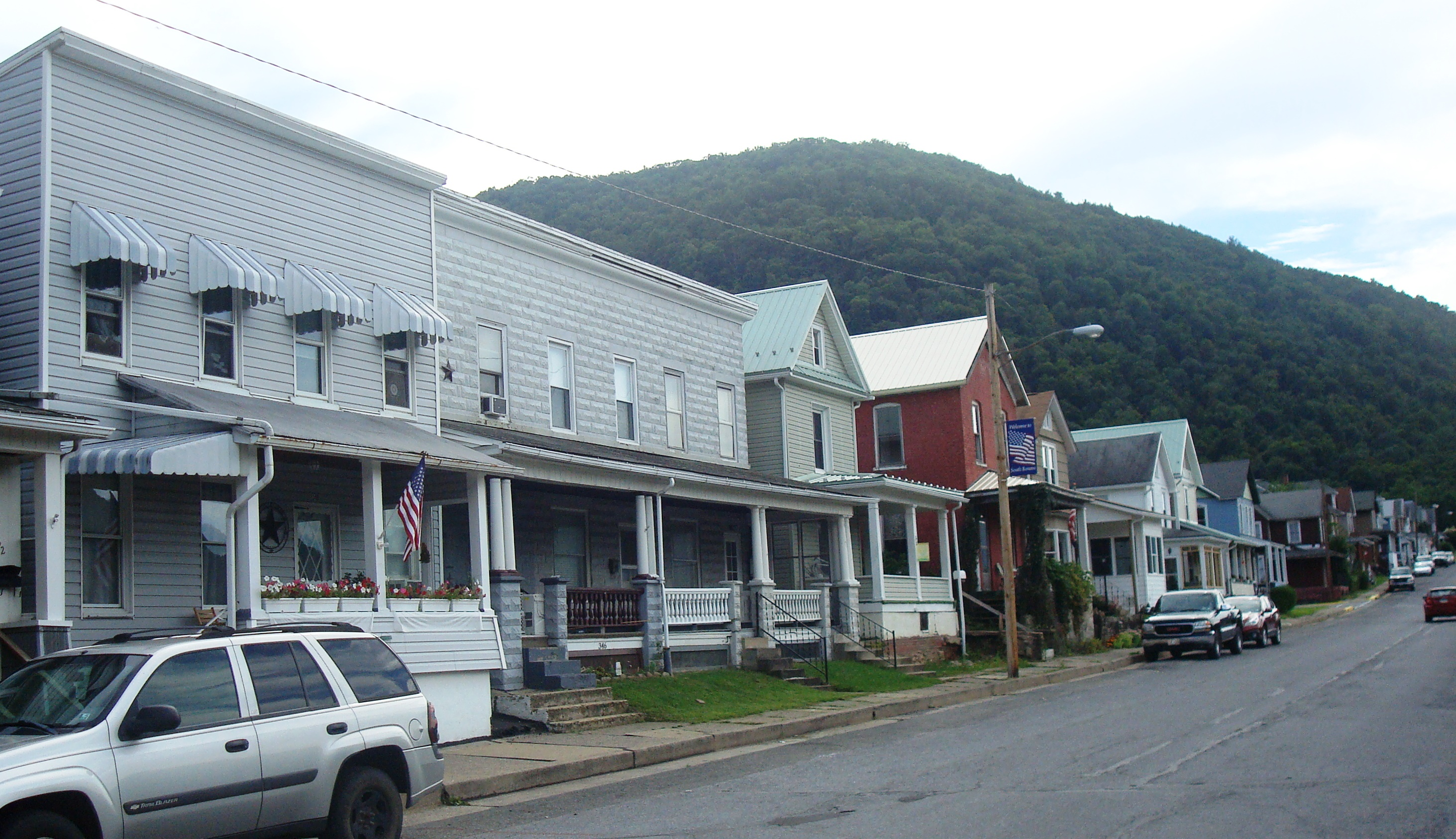
Susquehanna Avenue north of the bridge to Renovo

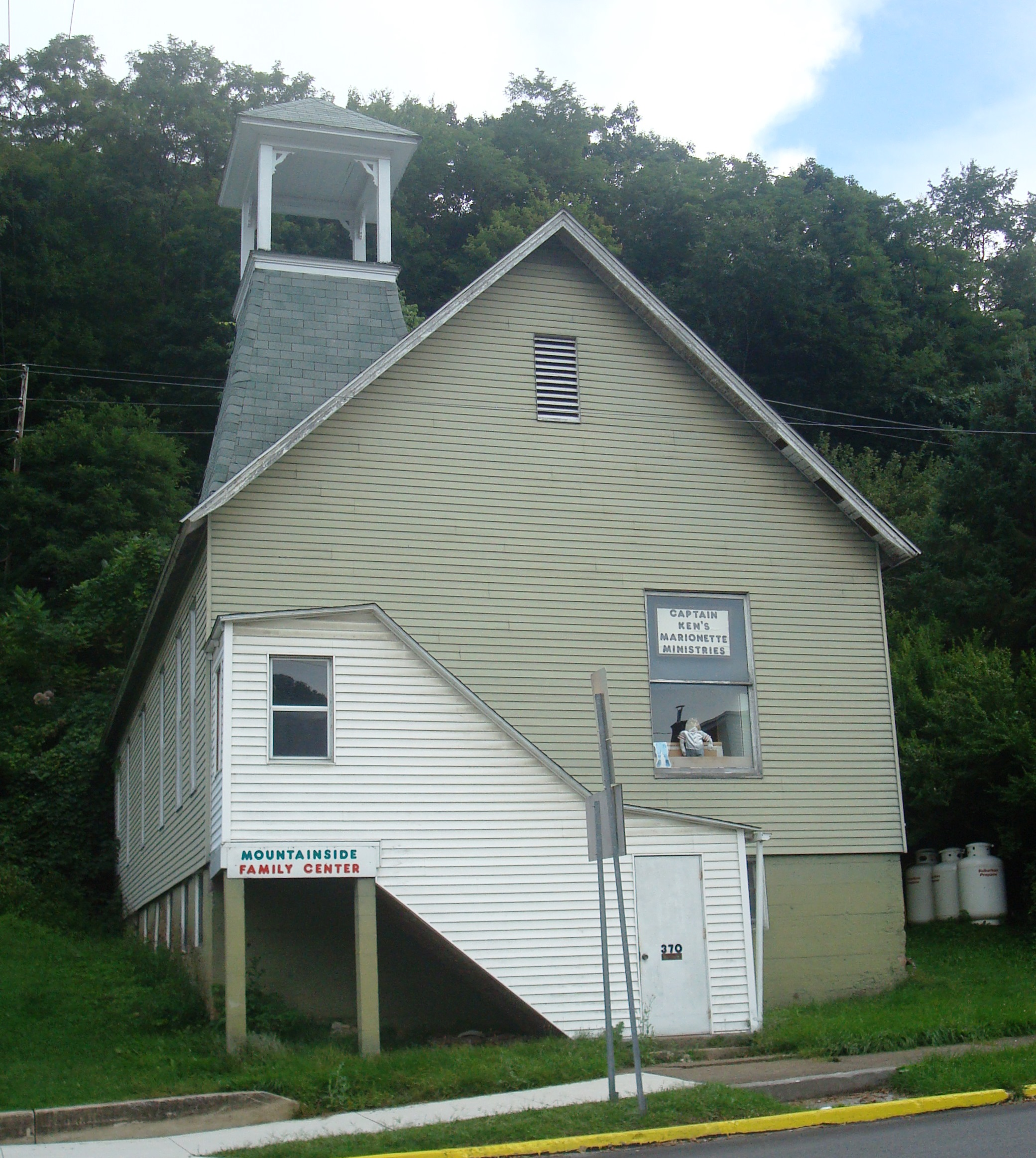
Mountainside Family Center

== See also ==
- Renovo, Pennsylvania
