= Chapman Township, Clinton County, Pennsylvania =

Township in Pennsylvania, US

Coordinates: 41°25′00″N 77°45′09″W

- Township
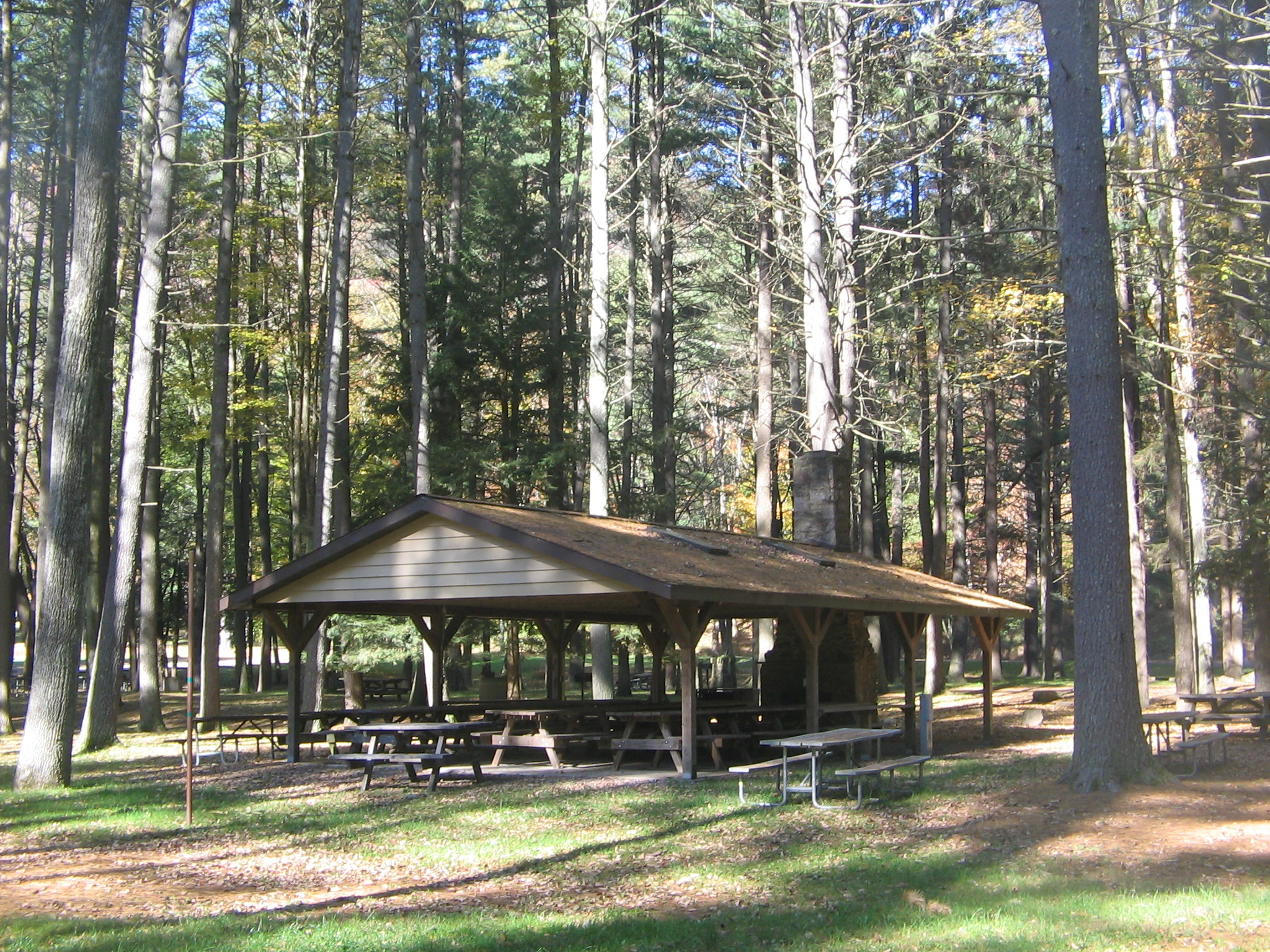
- Hyner Run State Park in Chapman Township

- Bicentennial logo

- Location in Clinton County and the state of Pennsylvania.
- Country: United States
- State: Pennsylvania
- County: Clinton

Government
  - Type: 2nd Class Township

Area
  - Total: 100.97 sq mi (261.52 km^{2})
  - Land: 100.08 sq mi (259.20 km^{2})
  - Water: 0.90 sq mi (2.32 km^{2})

Population (2020)
  - Total: 886 ▲
  - Estimate (2021): 885
  - Density: 8.5/sq mi (3.28/km^{2})
- Time zone: UTC-5 (EST)
  - Summer (DST): UTC-4 (EDT)
- FIPS code: 42-035-12640
- Website: www.chapmantownship-pa.us

Chapman Township is a township in Clinton County, Pennsylvania, United States. The population was 886 at the 2020 census, down from 993 in 2000. It was originally settled in 1780 and became an official township on February 3, 1819. Originally part of Lycoming County, Chapman Township was incorporated into the newly formed Clinton County in 1839.

== Geography ==
The township occupies the northeast corner of Clinton County and is bordered by Potter County to the north and Lycoming County to the northeast. The boroughs of Renovo and South Renovo border the southwest corner of the township. According to the United States Census Bureau, the township has a total area of 101.0 square miles (261.5 km^{2}), of which 100.1 square miles (259.2 km^{2}) is land and 0.89 square miles (2.3 km^{2}), or 0.89%, is water. Chapman Township maintains 14.92 miles (24.01 km) of paved road and 2.98 miles (4.80 km) of dirt road.

== Communities ==
- Farwell
- Gleasonton
- Hyner
- North Bend
- Renovo View

== Demographics ==
Historical population
Census	Pop.	Note	%±
1980	1,240		—
1990	978		−21.1%
2000	993		1.5%
2010	848		−14.6%
2020	886		4.5%
2021 (est.)	885		−0.1%

As of the census of 2000, there were 993 people, 422 households, and 287 families residing in the township. The population density was 10.0 people per square mile (3.9/km^{2}). There were 774 housing units at an average density of 7.8/sq mi (3.0/km^{2}). The racial makeup of the township was 99.40% White, 0.10% African American, 0.10% from other races, and 0.40% from two or more races. Hispanic or Latino of any race were 0.30% of the population.

There were 422 households, out of which 25.6% had children under the age of 18 living with them, 55.0% were married couples living together, 9.7% had a female householder with no husband present, and 31.8% were non-families. 26.5% of all households were made up of individuals, and 16.1% had someone living alone who was 65 years of age or older. The average household size was 2.35 and the average family size was 2.84.

In the township the population was spread out, with 20.8% under the age of 18, 6.0% from 18 to 24, 25.6% from 25 to 44, 27.9% from 45 to 64, and 19.6% who were 65 years of age or older. The median age was 43 years. For every 100 females, there were 97.0 males. For every 100 females age 18 and over, there were 94.6 males.

The median income for a household in the township was $29,500, and the median income for a family was $36,458. Males had a median income of $30,682 versus $20,337 for females. The per capita income for the township was $13,140. About 9.0% of families and 11.2% of the population were below the poverty line, including 11.9% of those under age 18 and 12.5% of those age 65 or over.
