= Renovo, Pennsylvania =

Borough in Pennsylvania, US

- Borough
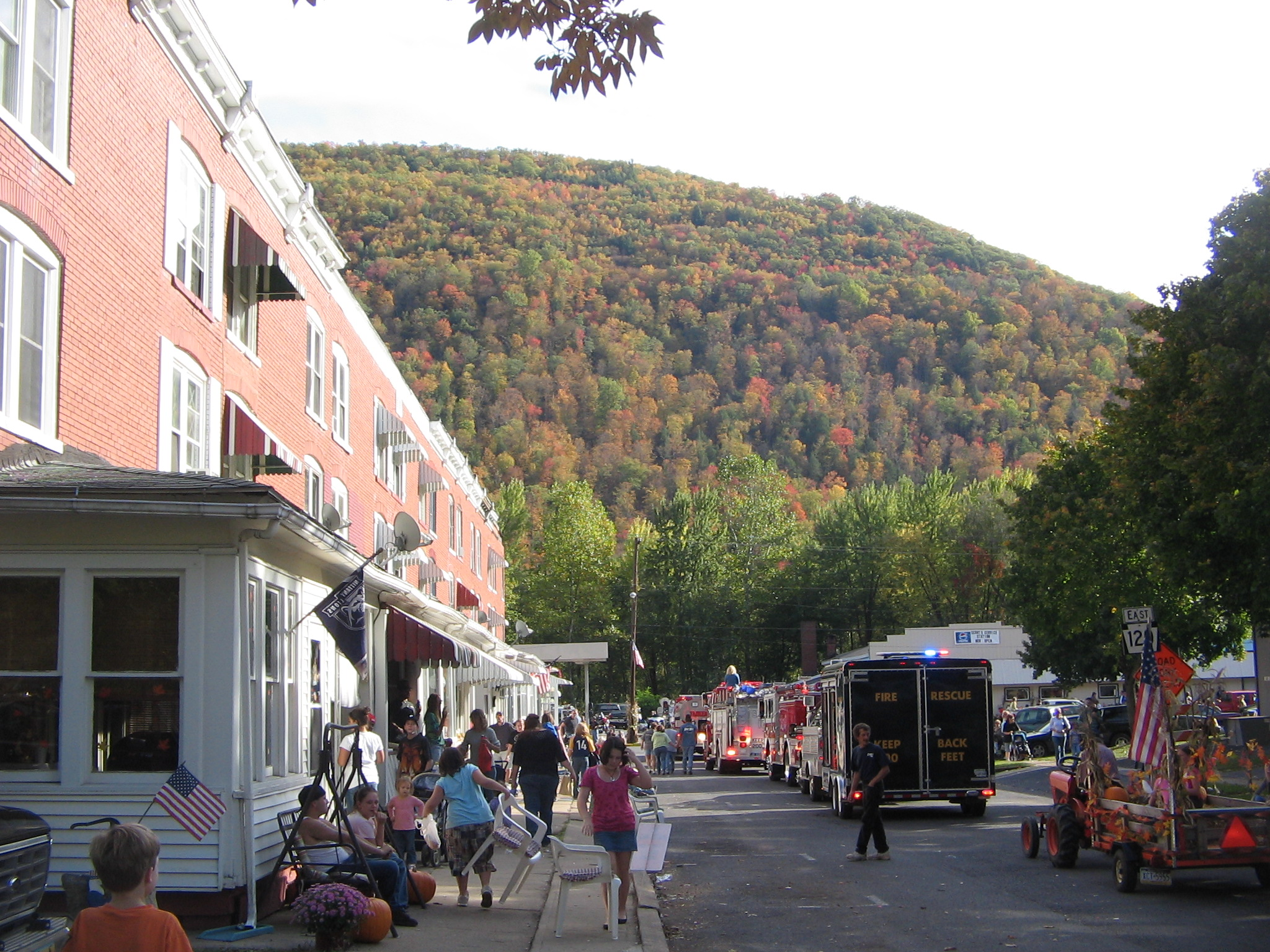
- 14th Street in Renovo, looking south during the Flaming Foliage Festival Parade

- Location in Clinton County and the U.S. state of Pennsylvania.
- Coordinates: 41°19′35″N 77°45′02″W
- Country: United States
- State: Pennsylvania
- County: Clinton
- Settled: 1825
- Incorporated (borough): 1860

Government
  - Type: Borough Council
  - Mayor: Justin Lynn (L)

Area
  - Total: 1.06 sq mi (2.74 km^{2})
  - Land: 1.05 sq mi (2.72 km^{2})
  - Water: 0.0039 sq mi (0.01 km^{2})
- Elevation: 668 ft (204 m)

Population (2020)
  - Total: 1,061
  - Density: 1,009.2/sq mi (389.64/km^{2})
- Time zone: Eastern (EST)
  - Summer (DST): EDT
- ZIP code: 17764
- Area code: 570
- FIPS code: 42-64200
- Website: https://renovoborough.org/

Renovo is a borough in Clinton County, Pennsylvania, United States, 28 miles (45 km) northwest of Lock Haven. As of the 2020 census, Renovo had a population of 1,061.

The borough is located on the West Branch Susquehanna River, and along Pennsylvania's Bucktail State Park Natural Area, centered on Pennsylvania Route 120, which winds through the surrounding mountains following the river. The town is the home of the "Flaming Foliage Festival" held each October, generally on the second weekend, celebrating the fall colors of the trees on the area's many mountains. The festival includes a parade and the crowning of a queen, usually chosen from one of the nearby high schools. The festival serves as a "homecoming" event for former residents of Renovo, many of whom return annually for the event. Various vendors from the surrounding areas sell food, clothing, and an array of novelties, memorabilia, and souvenirs.

The economy of Renovo and the surrounding area was primarily based on lumbering, until the first-growth forest was almost entirely stripped away, and the industry collapsed. There are also deposits of bituminous coal and fire clay in the region.

== History ==
Renovo was built for and by the Philadelphia & Erie Railroad as the midpoint between Philadelphia and Erie. The town was laid out on a mostly-flat flood plain along the West Branch of the Susquehanna River in North-Central Pennsylvania, and was incorporated in 1866. Many of the buildings of what became the sprawling Railroad Shops complex were built before, during, and after the American Civil War.

The Philadelphia and Erie Railroad, along with many other relatively smaller lines eventually became incorporated into the Pennsylvania Railroad. The Pennsylvania Railroad was the largest corporation in the world with an annual GPO larger than the federal government, and is the only corporation in history to have paid out dividends due to its profitability for 100 years.

Unlike most "rural" towns and residential areas, Renovo was laid out in an industrially-oriented urban grid with avenues given names of the Great Lakes, and "side streets" numbered from 1 to 16. Houses were mostly built close to one another or incorporated into row houses. Houses with larger lots allowing for big yards were a rare luxury.

Before the town was completely built out, Renovo was known and advertised as a "resort town in the mountains". One can still find newspaper ads and brochures extolling the restorative mountain air, clean water, and outdoor activities such as fishing and hunting. There were several large hotels in the town well before the turn of the 20th century. The railroad made access to this remote area seemingly quick and effortless for those living in other cities which enjoyed railroad service.

The town includes dozens of bars and restaurants, as well as multiple churches. Most institutions which one would find in a town of the era or today, such as a hospital, YMCA, schools, taxi service, shops, clubs, lodges, fraternal organizations, professional services, and sports teams, were established during this time.

The major employer was the Pennsylvania Railroad and Pennsylvania Railroad shops. The shops were a massive complex, stretching from one end of town to the other, containing a 25 rail freight classification yard, service shops for diesel and steam locomotives, and even its own coal power plant. As long as the Railroad prospered, the town was a bustling center of activity. Some aspects of railroad business began to decrease as early as before World War II, but business surged back strongly during the War. However, further decline in demand for both passenger and freight transportation via the railroad came with the building of the St. Lawrence Seaway, the building of the Interstate Highway System, the surge of automobile ownership and use, and the consolidation of the Pennsylvania Railroad's Shop facilities to other locations such as Pittsburgh and Altoona.

The closing of the shops in the 1960s tolled the death knell for Renovo as an enterprising town with a future. Its present population is less than 2,000; it was once around 5,000. Many residents drive the two-lane, windy roads and I-80 to other towns for employment. There is also a substantial contingent of lifelong residents and transplants who are retired. The change in human activity over the years hasn't dimmed or substantially altered the natural environment of this Allegheny Mountain area of the larger Appalachian Highlands.

In 1972, Renovo, along with many other parts of Pennsylvania were devastated by flooding and torrential rain from Hurricane Agnes, which stalled over the state, dumping up to 19 inches on parts of the state, and between 8 - 10 inches on Renovo.

In the 1980s, Renovo was a pawn in a large scandal, which sought to defraud the United States Government of millions of dollars. In 1983, a company called Chem-Con Corp. took over the vacant railroad shops after Berwick Forge & Fabricating, which made railroad boxcars, closed. Chem-Con made seasheds, which are containers used to transport military vehicles, for the U.S. Navy. In 1986, Chem-con was first suspected of inflating costs to the government. The FBI began an investigation into Chem-com in the same year, and Chem-con was exposed for defrauding nearly $12 Million from the U.S. Government and Navy. In 1987, Chem-con filed for bankruptcy, and a company called American Coastal Industries resumed operations at the shop buildings, later going bankrupt too. This scandal and "false hope" for the town, bringing hundreds of the town's unemployed back to work, in addition to a fire that tore through the business district on Erie Avenue, was devastating for Renovo, adding many more to the jobless and money-tight residents, who would eventually leave town for better opportunities.

In 2025, Renovo elected its first Libertarian mayor, Justin Lynn.

=== Renovo Energy Center ===
In early 2015, the Clinton County Economic Partnership announced that it would be working with Renovo Energy Center LLC. to plan out the construction of a new natural gas fired power plant on the site of the old Pennsylvania Rail Road shops across the tracks from Erie avenue. The project's original planned construction date was 2017 but has since been pushed back. The project is expected to bring over 500 construction workers to Renovo and offer around 30 full time jobs. In November 2020, Renovo Energy Center LLC. asked the Pennsylvania DEP to review and change their clean air license to "make its operations more efficient and the plant more attractive to investors". A Philadelphia-based activist group, the Clean Air Council, opposed the changes to the clean air license, posting their opposition on social media and mass mailing requests for public opposition to the plant.

On April 29, 2021, the Pennsylvania Department of Environmental Protection announced the approval of the Renovo Energy Center project's air quality permit. After the permit's approval, Renovo Energy Center LLC contracted Letterle & Associates of Bellefonte, PA to conduct soil tests to assess the condition of the land.

In on May 27, 2021, three environmental groups, Clean Air Council, Penn Future, and the Center for Biological Diversity, filed an appeal for the air quality permit, saying, "The permit allows the power plant to emit hundreds of tons of noxious pollutants annually and more greenhouse gases than the City of Pittsburgh. Despite DEP recognizing that Renovo is an environmental justice community, DEP failed to do the outreach required to community members before issuing the permit for one of the most-polluting facilities in Pennsylvania. The groups object to the permit on those grounds as well as the grounds that the permit allows unlawful levels of air pollution, that DEP ignored the costs to society in issuing the permit, and based on several other deficiencies spelled out in the Notice of Appeal. The groups said air pollution from the power plant would likely kill dozens of people over the course of the plant’s life and cost several billion dollars in impacts to health and communities. The power plant is being developed by Bechtel Corporation, a Virginia-based multinational engineering corporation. “Our members are deeply concerned about the very high levels of harmful air pollution from Bechtel’s enormous proposed power plant and the negative health effects it could have on our families and friends,” said Sue Cannon with Renovo Residents for a Healthy Environment. “This power plant is unwanted, unnecessary, and will provide no benefits to residents – only burdens."

On August 29, 2022, the Pennsylvania Environmental Hearing Board granted partial summary judgement. In this partial ruling, Chief EHB Judge Thomas W. Renwand had ruled that the DEP "has provided no basis for selecting a higher volatile organic compound emissions limit for the Renovo Energy Center facility" and ruled in favor of the appellants. Following the ruling, REC project manager Rick Franzese stated, "The REC project remains viable so long as the appeal of the project’s air permit is favorably resolved."

On April 14, 2023, Bechtel backed out of the proposed energy plant.

Maureen A. Ruhl was the key player in the demise of the proposed billion-dollar natural gas-to-electricity power plant. Ruhl proclaimed she wasn't against the power plant itself, but the location which was anticipated to be less than a football field away from the residents' homes.

== Geography ==
Renovo is located in north-central Clinton County at 41°19′43″N 77°44′54″W (41.327669, -77.749580), along the West Branch Susquehanna River, at the bottom of a 1,000-to-1,200-foot-deep (300 to 370 m) gorge. South Renovo is directly across the river, on the south bank. The vicinity of the town is one of the least densely populated areas in the eastern U.S. and was featured as such in the book The Last Empty Places (2010), by Peter Stark.

According to the United States Census Bureau, Renovo has a total area of 1.13 square miles (2.93 km^{2}), of which 1.13 square miles (2.92 km^{2}) is land and 0.004 square miles (0.01 km^{2}), or 0.48%, is water.

Pennsylvania Route 120 passes through the borough, leading southeast (downriver) 28 miles (45 km) to Lock Haven, the county seat, and west then northwest up Sinnemahoning Creek and its tributaries 45 miles (72 km) to Emporium. Pennsylvania Route 144 crosses the West Branch from Renovo into South Renovo and leads southwest 35 miles (56 km) to Snow Shoe and Interstate 80. PA 144 leads north 44 miles (71 km) to Galeton on U.S. Route 6.

Airports and distances from Renovo:

- Jersey Shore Airport - 54 minutes (43.1 miles)
- Williamsport Regional Airport - 1 hour 9 minutes (59.4 miles)
- University Park Airport in State College, Pennsylvania - 1 hour 14 minutes (57.0 miles)
- Bradford Regional Airport - 1 hour and 57 minutes (83.3 miles)
- DuBois Airport - 1 hour and 39 minutes (89.2 miles)
- Johnstown Airport - 2 hours and 24 minutes (135.0 miles)
- Harrisburg International Airport - 2 hours and 37 minutes (145.8 miles)

=== Climate ===
Climate data for Renovo, Pennsylvania (1991–2020 normals, extremes 1896–present)
Month	Jan	Feb	Mar	Apr	May	Jun	Jul	Aug	Sep	Oct	Nov	Dec	Year
Record high °F (°C)	69 (21)	76 (24)	86 (30)	92 (33)	96 (36)	96 (36)	105 (41)	98 (37)	96 (36)	88 (31)	81 (27)	73 (23)	105 (41)
Mean daily maximum °F (°C)	34.1 (1.2)	37.8 (3.2)	47.1 (8.4)	60.7 (15.9)	71.9 (22.2)	79.1 (26.2)	83.0 (28.3)	81.4 (27.4)	74.6 (23.7)	62.3 (16.8)	49.7 (9.8)	38.7 (3.7)	60.0 (15.6)
Daily mean °F (°C)	26.5 (−3.1)	28.7 (−1.8)	36.7 (2.6)	48.3 (9.1)	59.2 (15.1)	67.3 (19.6)	71.5 (21.9)	70.2 (21.2)	63.3 (17.4)	51.6 (10.9)	40.7 (4.8)	31.8 (−0.1)	49.6 (9.8)
Mean daily minimum °F (°C)	18.8 (−7.3)	19.5 (−6.9)	26.3 (−3.2)	36.0 (2.2)	46.4 (8.0)	55.5 (13.1)	60.0 (15.6)	58.9 (14.9)	52.1 (11.2)	40.8 (4.9)	31.6 (−0.2)	24.9 (−3.9)	39.2 (4.0)
Record low °F (°C)	−19 (−28)	−23 (−31)	−7 (−22)	15 (−9)	24 (−4)	34 (1)	37 (3)	35 (2)	28 (−2)	14 (−10)	10 (−12)	−9 (−23)	−23 (−31)
Average precipitation inches (mm)	2.74 (70)	2.21 (56)	3.06 (78)	3.61 (92)	3.85 (98)	4.02 (102)	3.95 (100)	3.72 (94)	4.30 (109)	3.51 (89)	3.12 (79)	3.13 (80)	41.22 (1,047)
Average snowfall inches (cm)	9.0 (23)	9.5 (24)	5.2 (13)	0.7 (1.8)	0.0 (0.0)	0.0 (0.0)	0.0 (0.0)	0.0 (0.0)	0.0 (0.0)	0.1 (0.25)	1.5 (3.8)	6.7 (17)	32.7 (83)
Average precipitation days (≥ 0.01 in)	13.9	11.6	12.0	13.5	14.0	12.9	12.1	10.8	11.2	12.6	11.9	13.9	150.4
Average snowy days (≥ 0.1 in)	6.5	5.1	2.7	0.4	0.0	0.0	0.0	0.0	0.0	0.1	1.0	3.7	19.5
Source: NOAA

== Demographics ==
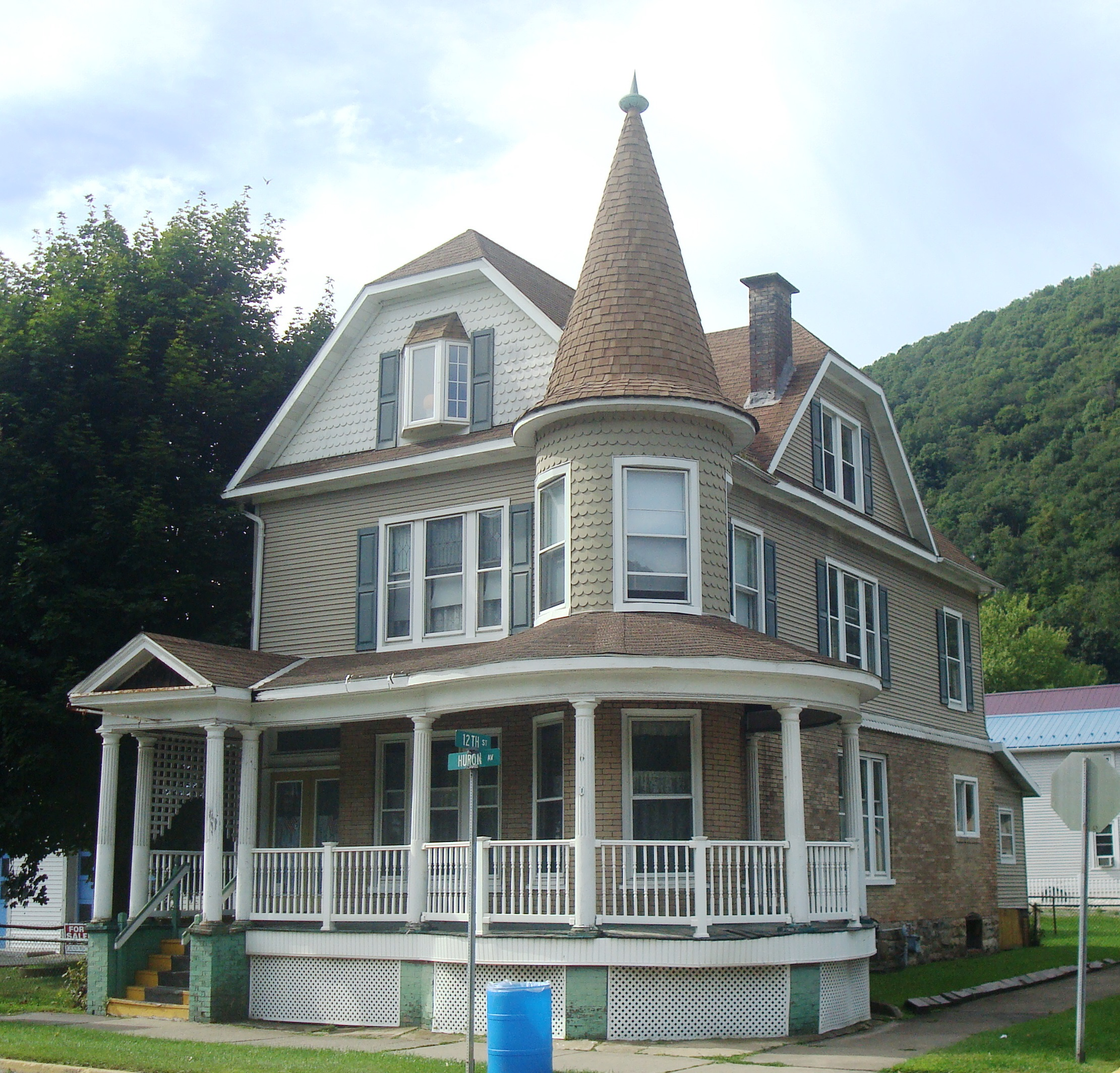
A house on Huron Avenue (PA 120), Renovo's main thoroughfare

Historical population
Census	Pop.	Note	%±
1870	1,940		—
1880	3,708		91.1%
1890	4,154		12.0%
1900	4,082		−1.7%
1910	4,621		13.2%
1920	5,877		27.2%
1930	3,947		−32.8%
1940	3,784		−4.1%
1950	3,751		−0.9%
1960	3,316		−11.6%
1970	2,620		−21.0%
1980	1,812		−30.8%
1990	1,526		−15.8%
2000	1,318		−13.6%
2010	1,228		−6.8%
2020	1,061		−13.6%

As of the census of 2000, there were 1,318 people, 593 households, and 333 families residing in the borough. The population density was 1,136.0 inhabitants per square mile (438.6/km^{2}). There were 727 housing units at an average density of 626.6 units per square mile (241.9 units/km^{2}). The racial makeup of the borough was 98.94% White, 0.23% African American, 0.08% Native American, 0.08% Pacific Islander, and 0.68% from two or more races. Hispanic or Latino people of any race were 0.38% of the population.

There were 593 households, out of which 29.0% had children under the age of 18 living with them, 35.4% were married couples living together, 15.0% had a female householder with no husband present, and 43.7% were non-families. 38.3% of all households were made up of individuals, and 21.8% had someone living alone who was 65 years of age or older. The average household size was 2.22 and the average family size was 2.94.

In the borough the population was spread out, with 25.9% under the age of 18, 8.0% from 18 to 24, 24.3% from 25 to 44, 21.9% from 45 to 64, and 20.0% who were 65 years of age or older. The median age was 40 years. For every 100 females, there were 93.0 males. For every 100 females age 18 and over, there were 87.7 males.

The median income for a household in the borough was $18,636, and the median income for a family was $23,854. Males had a median income of $26,328 versus $16,429 for females. The per capita income for the borough was $11,709. About 25.7% of families and 30.2% of the population were below the poverty line, including 50.8% of those under age 18 and 12.0% of those age 65 or over.

== Points of interest ==
Renovo is in the heart of the Pennsylvania Wilds which comprises twelve and a half counties (Warren, McKean, Potter, Tioga, Forest, Elk, Cameron, Clinton, Lycoming, Clarion, Jefferson, Clearfield and part of Centre) located in north-central Pennsylvania. This area contains over two million acres of remote, mountainous, and pristine lands located on state forest lands, state game lands, state park lands and public grounds that offer a wide variety of recreational opportunities. The Wilds has within it 29 state parks, eight state forests, 50 state game lands, abundant wildlife, several natural/wild areas, and miles of hiking trails and fishing streams. This region also contains the largest elk herd in the Northeast, stretching as far west as Ridgway and as far east as Renovo.

== Community services ==
- The Renovo Fire Dept. formed after the merger of the Emerald hose company, and the West Branch Hose company. Later merging with the Fireman's Ambulance Service Team (F.A.S.T) to created renovo Fire Department Inc. / Renovo EMS
- The Renovo Police Dept.
- Bucktail Medical Center - Located in South Renovo
- Family Practice of Renovo
- Bucktail Area Middle/High School (Chapman Township)
- Renovo Elementary (Chapman Township)
- Advocates United for Humanity (Chapman Township)

== Notable people ==
- Bill Friel, former pro baseball player
- John Montgomery Ward, Baseball Hall of Fame member

== Gallery ==
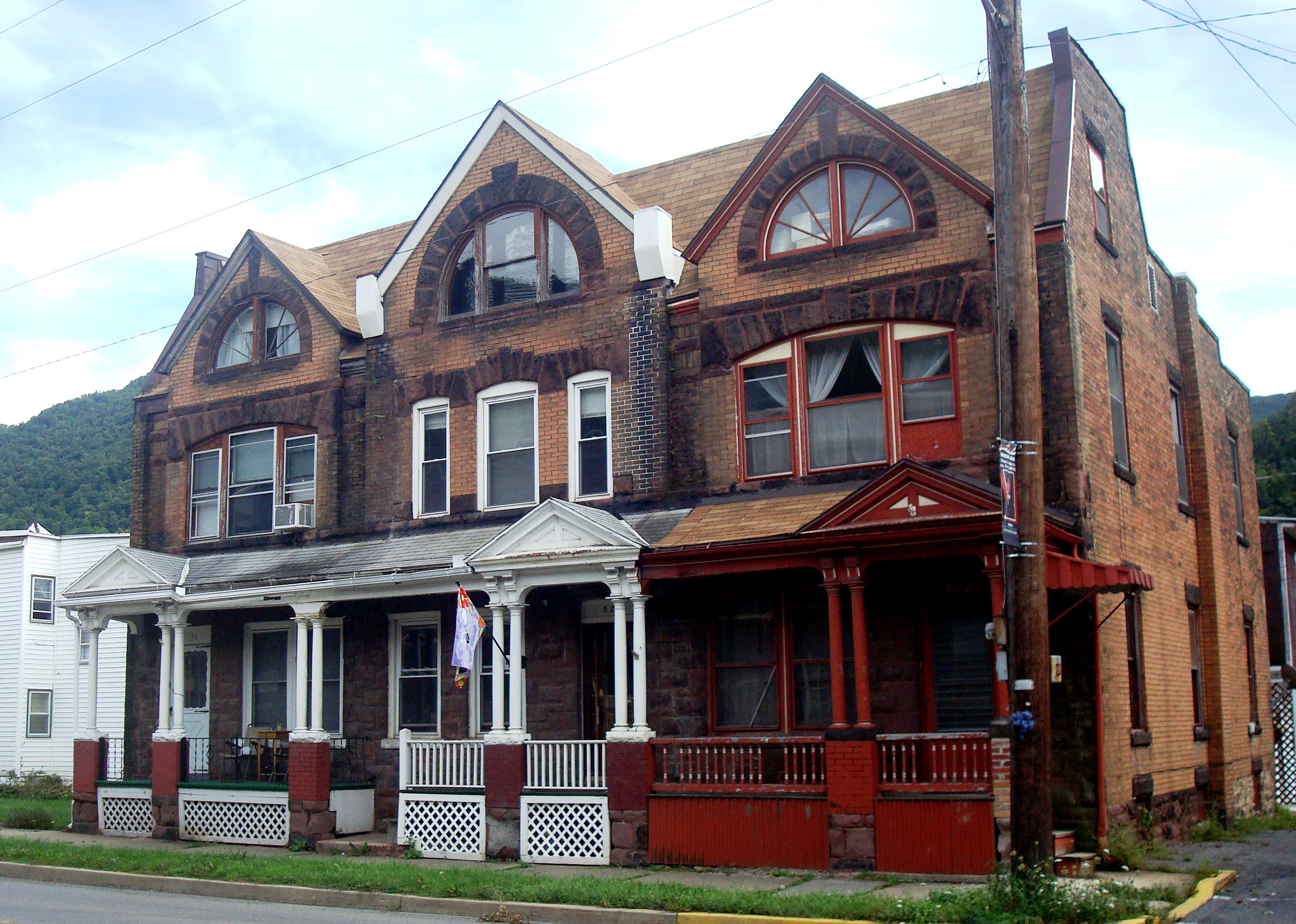
Residences on Huron Avenue

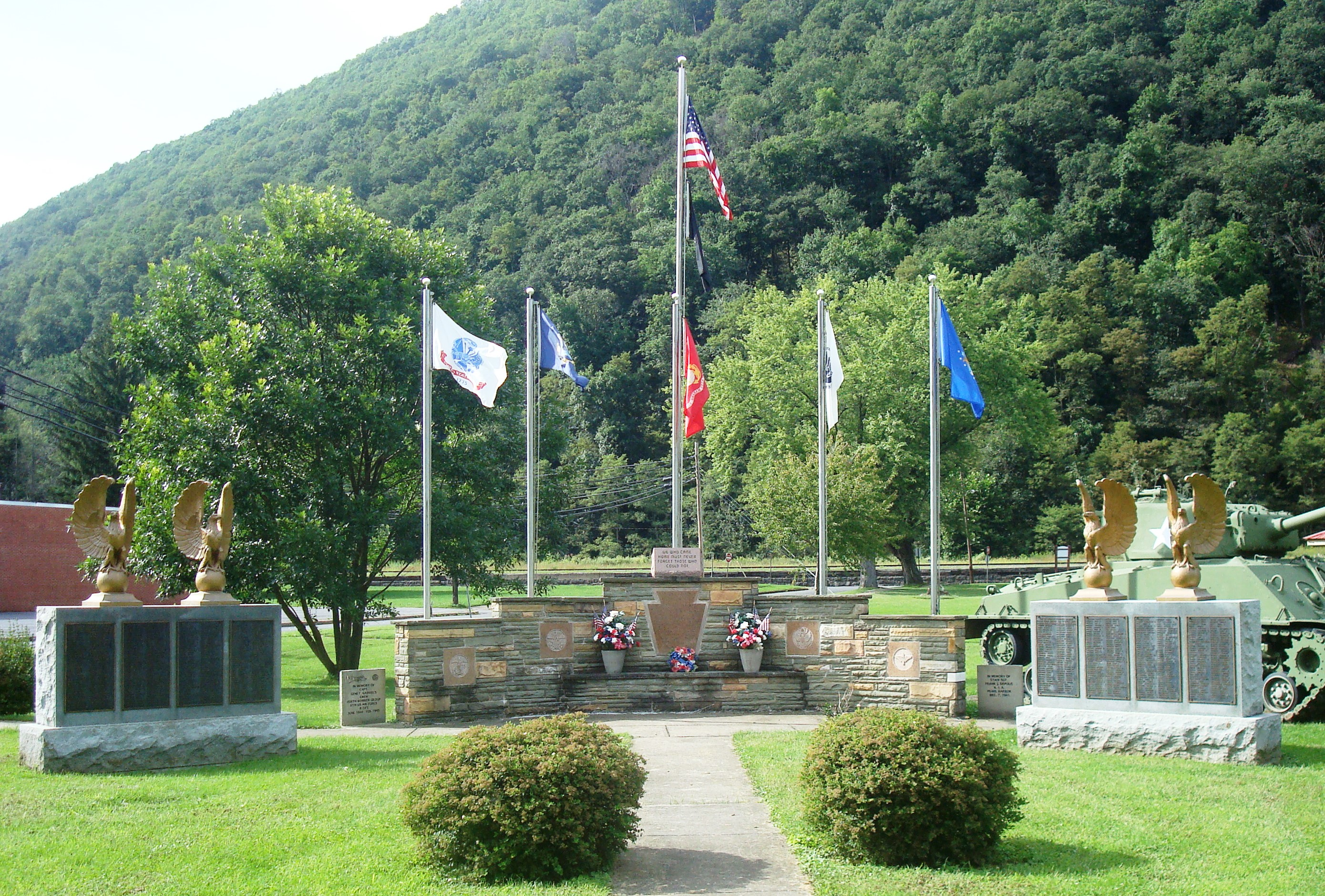
Veterans' memorial includes a Sherman tank.

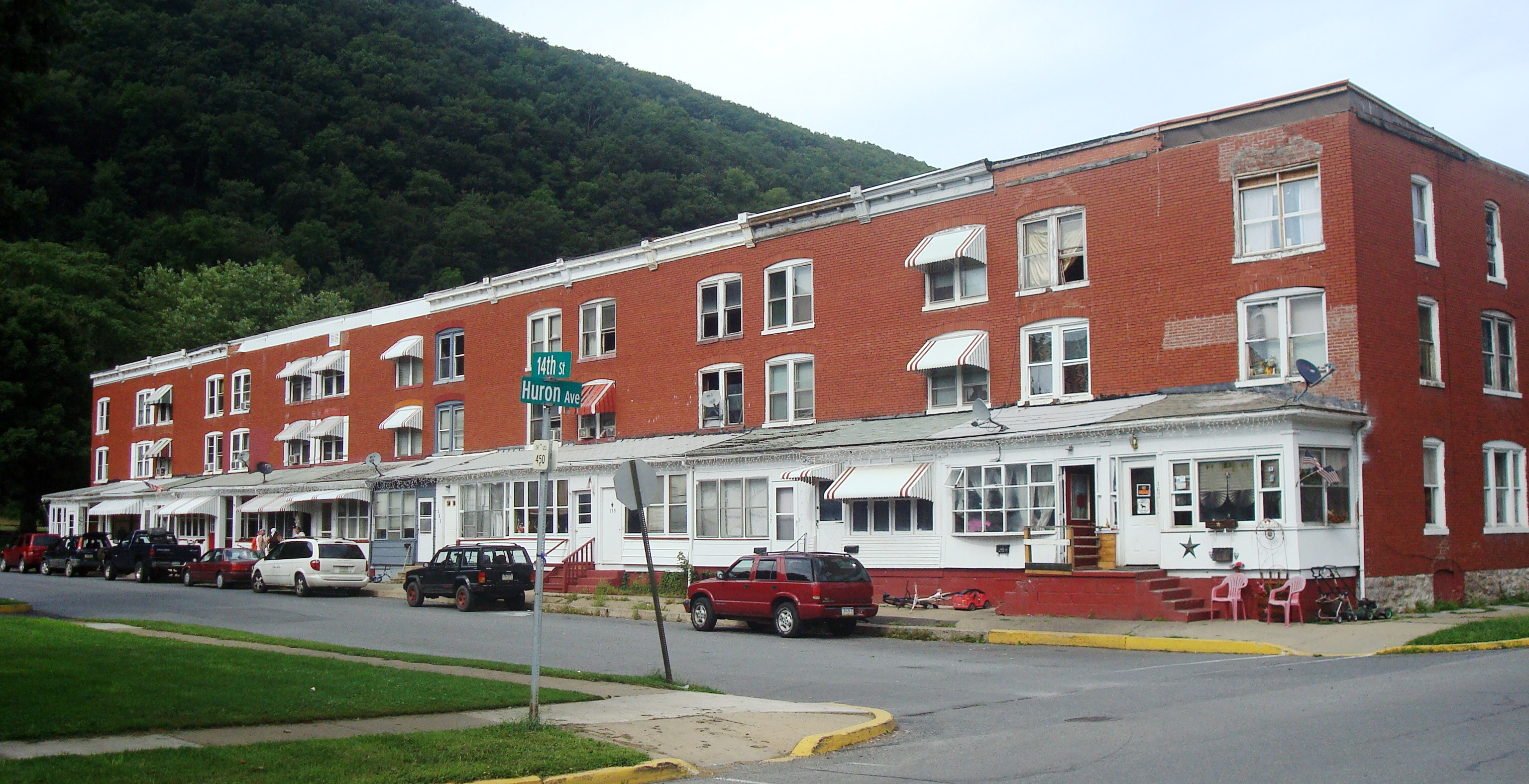
Row houses on 14th Street

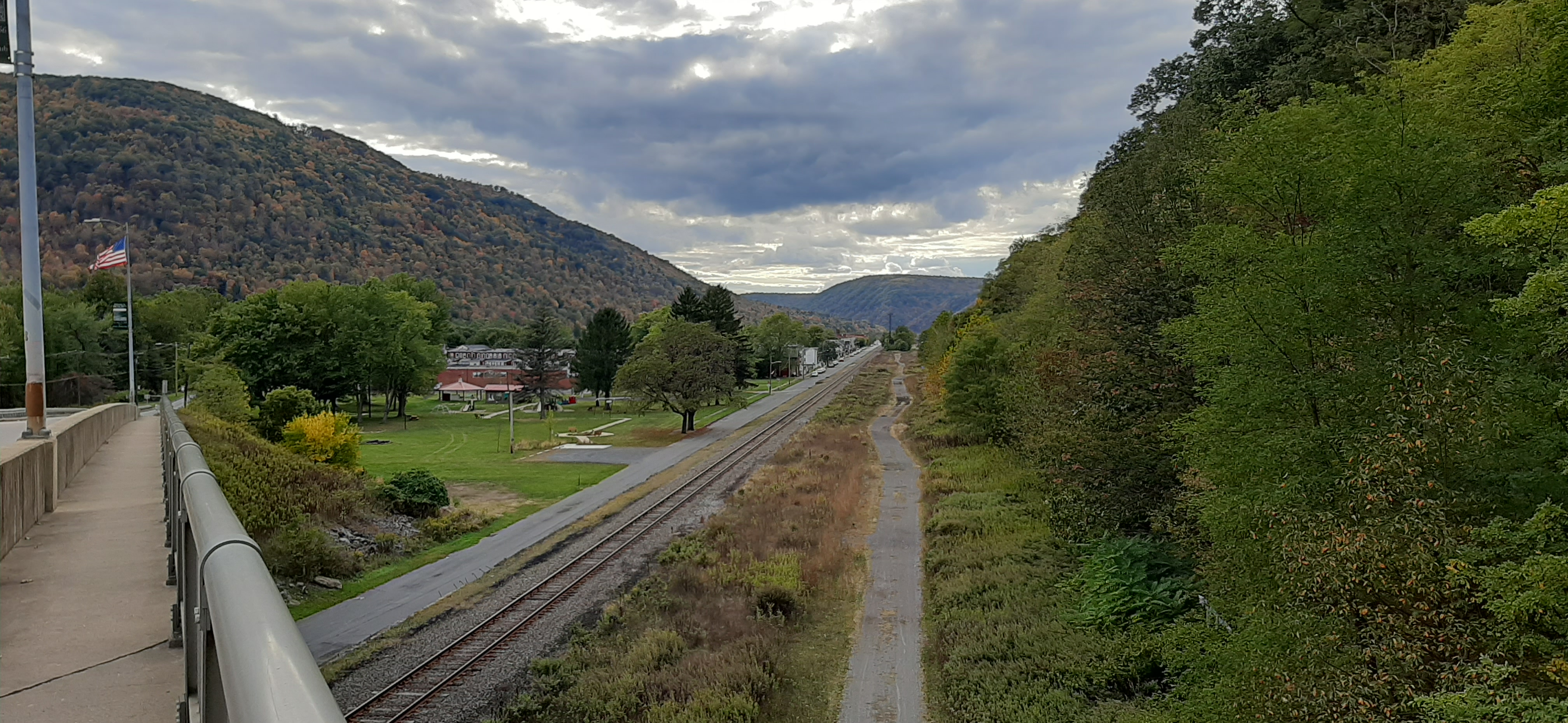
16th Street Park From Susquehanna Avenue
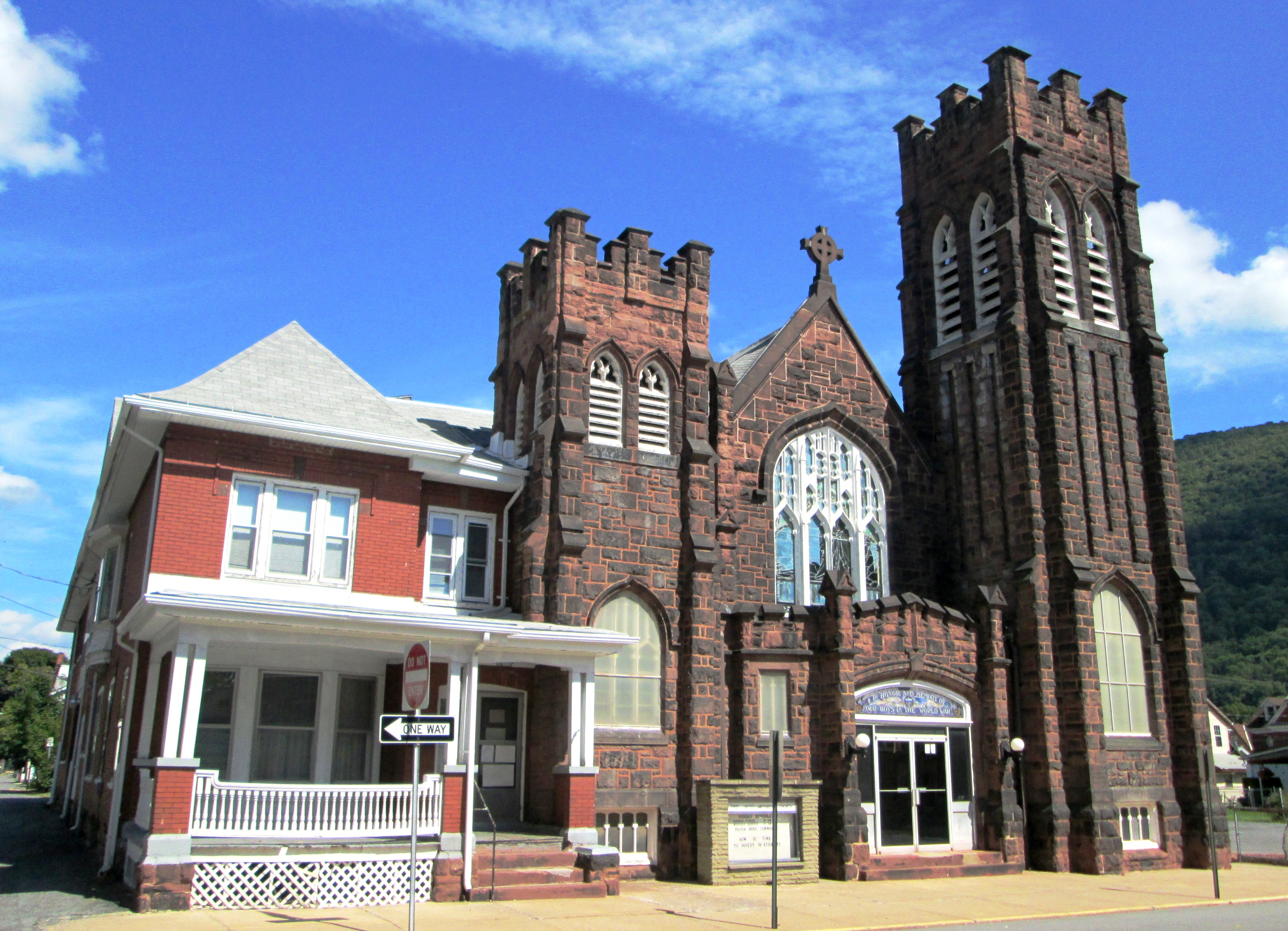
First United Methodist Church and rectory

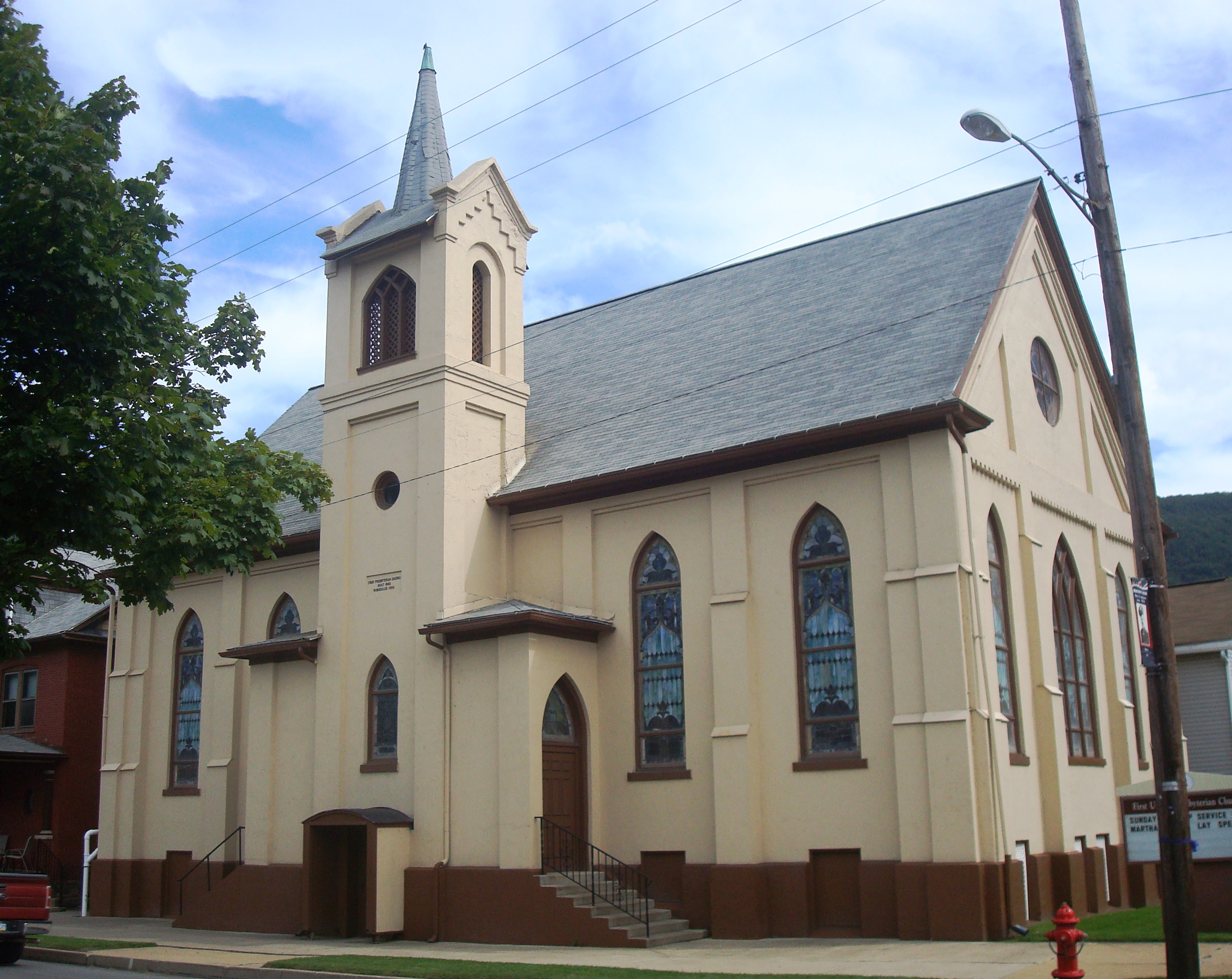
First United Presbyterian Church

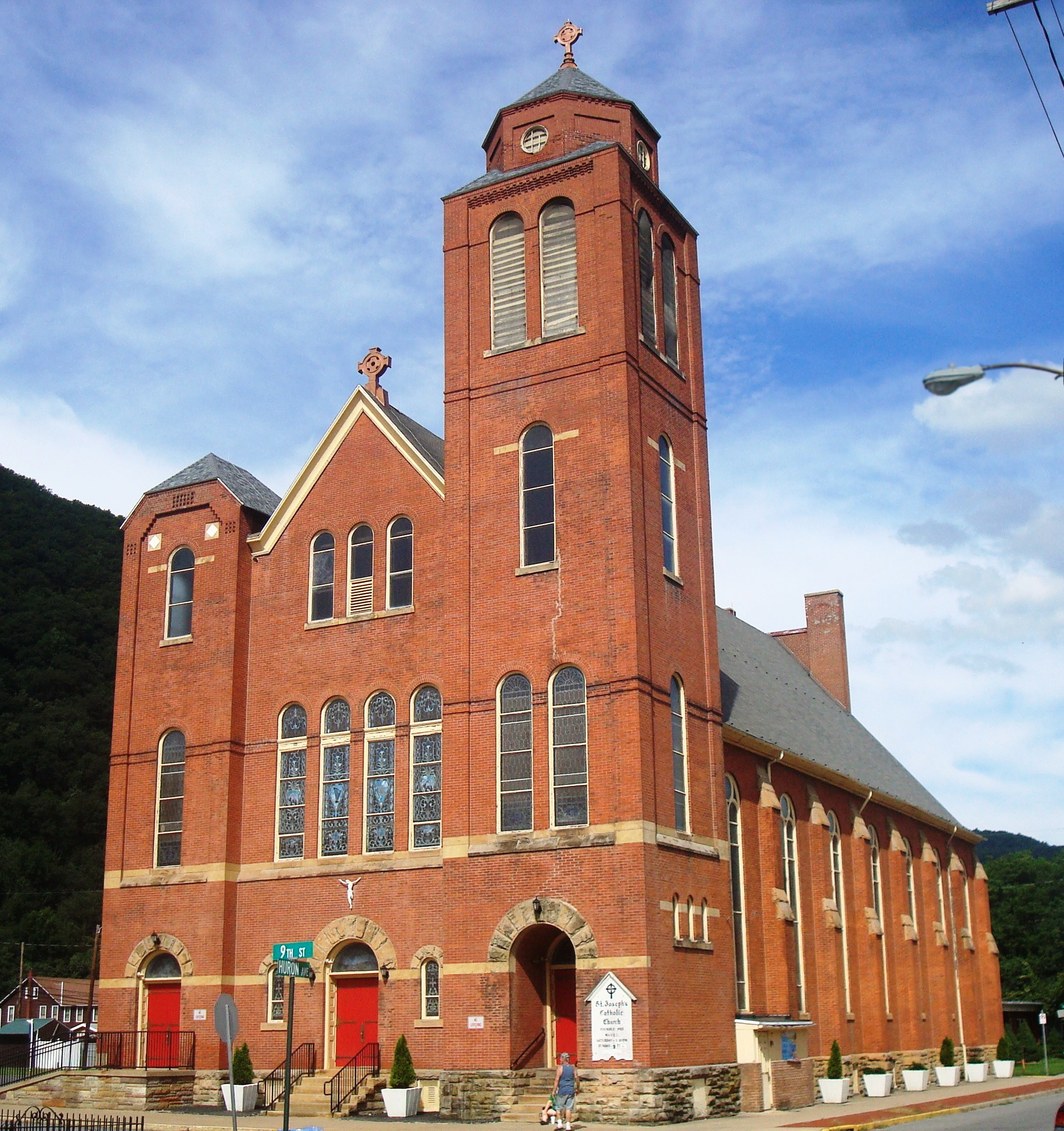
St. Joseph's Catholic Church

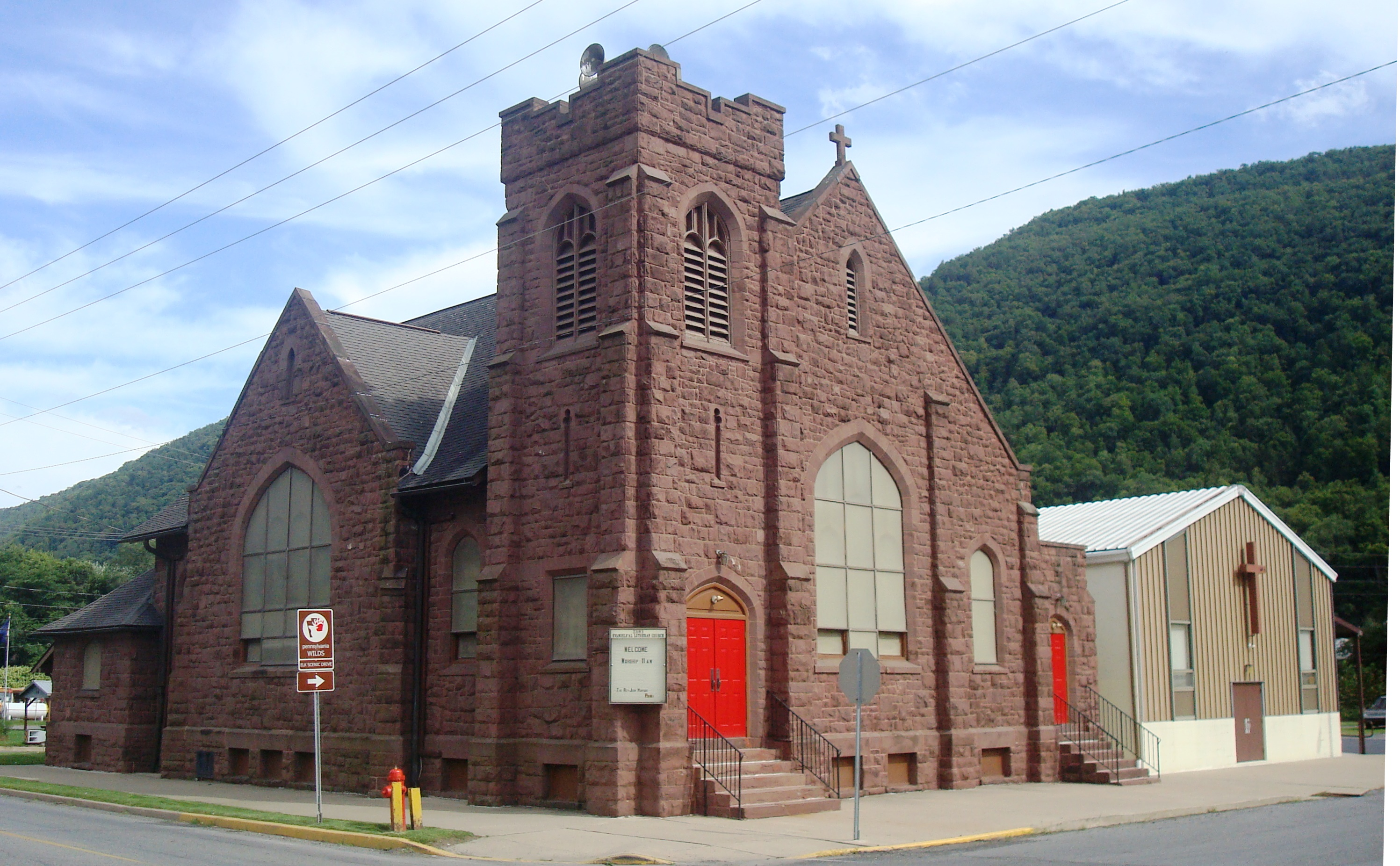
Zion Evangelical Lutheran Church

== See also ==
- South Renovo, Pennsylvania
