= James W. Quiggle =

American politician

Member of the Pennsylvania Senate for the 14th District
- In office 1855–1858
- Preceded by: William F. Packer
- Succeeded by: Francis Jordan

Personal details
- Born: James Williams Quiggle; January 20, 1820 Wayne, Pennsylvania
- Died: November 28, 1878 (aged 58)
- Spouse: Cordelia Mayer (m. 1848)
- Relations: Henry Wharton Shoemaker (grandson); Blanche Shoemaker Wagstaff (granddaughter)
- Children: 3
- Parent(s): John Quiggle; Rebecca Nicely

James Williams Quiggle (January 20, 1820 – November 28, 1878) was an American railroad magnate, politician and diplomat.

== Early life ==
Quiggle was born in Wayne, Pennsylvania on January 20, 1820. He was the son of Johannes "John" Quiggle (1764–1845) and Rebecca (née Nicely) Quiggle (1776–1854).

He studied law with James Gamble in Jersey Shore, Pennsylvania.

== Career ==
In 1841, Quiggle was admitted to Clinton and Lycoming bar. From 1853 to 1855. He was elected as a Buchanan Democrat and served in the Pennsylvania State Senate representing District 14 (Centre, Clinton, Lycoming, Sullivan counties). He was a Lt.-Col. on Governor William F. Packer's staff before fellow Pennsylvanian, President James Buchanan, appointed him U.S. Consul to Antwerp. During the Civil War, he attempted to persuade Gen. Giuseppe Garibaldi to command military operations for the Lincoln administration, a plan abandoned by early 1863.

After his service abroad, he returned to Clinton County where he served as Deputy Attorney General and later, prosecuting attorney.

== Personal life ==
On July 2, 1848, he married Cordelia Mayer (1828–1914), the sister of Judge Jacob Mayer. The Mayers were direct descendants of Richard Buffington, an agent for William Penn who came to Pennsylvania from England in 1675. Together, they were the parents of three children:

- Harry Quiggle (b. 1850), who died young.
- James Clarence Quiggle (1851-1921), who was elected to the Pennsylvania House of Representatives as a Democrat in 1890 and 1892.
- Blanche Quiggle (1853–1928), who married Henry F. Shoemaker in 1874.

He owned "Restless Oaks", the family estate in McElhattan, Pennsylvania (near Lock Haven).

Quiggle died in 1878 and was buried in Lock Haven where a "fine granite monument to his memory stands in the old Quiggle burial ground one mile east of the Quiggle homestead."

=== Descendants ===
Through his daughter Blanche, he was a grandfather of diplomat Henry Wharton Shoemaker (1880–1958), stockbroker William Brock Shoemaker (1882–1906), and poet Blanche LeRoy Shoemaker (1886–1967).

Through his son James, he was a grandfather of James Williams Quiggle.

Pennsylvania State Senate
Preceded by William F. Packer	Member of the Pennsylvania; Senate, 14th District; 1855–1858	Succeeded by Francis Jordan
