= Henry Shoemaker =

Henry Shoemaker may refer to:

- Henry F. Shoemaker (1843–1918), American railroad magnate and financier
- Henry W. Shoemaker (1880–1958), American writer and diplomat
