= Pine Creek Township, Clinton County, Pennsylvania =

Township in Pennsylvania, US

Coordinates: 41°11′36″N 77°20′44″W

- Township
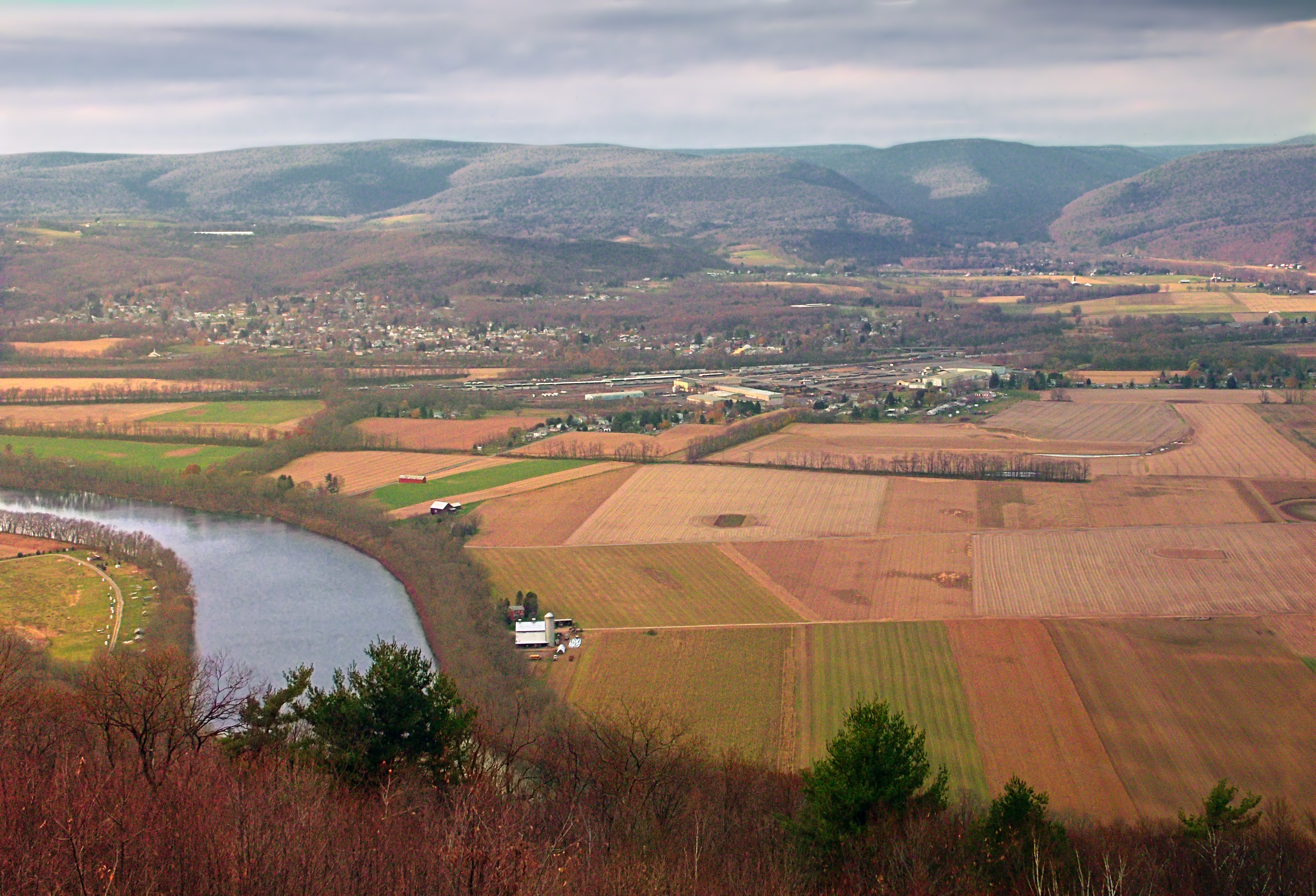
- Pine Creek Township as seen from atop a ridge in Wayne Township

- Logo

- Location in Clinton County and the state of Pennsylvania.
- Country: United States
- State: Pennsylvania
- County: Clinton
- Settled: 1772
- Incorporated: Before 1839

Area
  - Total: 14.91 sq mi (38.62 km^{2})
  - Land: 14.41 sq mi (37.31 km^{2})
  - Water: 0.51 sq mi (1.31 km^{2})

Population (2020)
  - Total: 3,394 ▲
  - Estimate (2021): 3,391
  - Density: 226.6/sq mi (87.51/km^{2})
- FIPS code: 42-035-60360
- Website: www.pinecreektownship.com

Pine Creek Township is a township in Clinton County, Pennsylvania, United States. The population was 3,394 at the 2020 census. The township is named for Pine Creek, which flows into the West Branch Susquehanna River at the border of the township with Lycoming County, between the boroughs of Avis and Jersey Shore

== Geography ==
According to the United States Census Bureau, the township has a total area of 14.9 square miles (38.6 km^{2}), of which 14.4 square miles (37.3 km^{2}) is land and 0.50 square miles (1.3 km^{2}), or 3.38%, is water. It contains the census-designated place of Woolrich.

== Demographics ==
Historical population
Census	Pop.	Note	%±
1980	3,100		—
1990	3,188		2.8%
2000	3,184		−0.1%
2010	3,215		1.0%
2020	3,394		5.6%
2021 (est.)	3,391		−0.1%

As of the census of 2000, there were 3,184 people, 1,293 households, and 941 families residing in the township. The population density was 221.3 inhabitants per square mile (85.4/km^{2}). There were 1,379 housing units at an average density of 95.9 per square mile (37.0/km^{2}). The racial makeup of the township was 99.31% White, 0.25% African American, 0.03% Native American, 0.09% Asian, 0.06% Pacific Islander, 0.09% from other races, and 0.16% from two or more races. Hispanic or Latino of any race were 0.06% of the population.

There were 1,293 households, out of which 28.7% had children under the age of 18 living with them, 60.4% were married couples living together, 8.9% had a female householder with no husband present, and 27.2% were non-families. 22.8% of all households were made up of individuals, and 10.4% had someone living alone who was 65 years of age or older. The average household size was 2.46 and the average family size was 2.86.

In the township the population was spread out, with 22.9% under the age of 18, 6.3% from 18 to 24, 27.3% from 25 to 44, 27.8% from 45 to 64, and 15.8% who were 65 years of age or older. The median age was 41 years. For every 100 females, there were 95.9 males. For every 100 females age 18 and over, there were 95.5 males.

The median income for a household in the township was $39,464, and the median income for a family was $44,085. Males had a median income of $33,333 versus $21,628 for females. The per capita income for the township was $20,451. About 4.8% of families and 6.3% of the population were below the poverty line, including 9.1% of those under age 18 and 6.1% of those age 65 or over.
