= Dunstable (disambiguation) =

Dunstable is a market town and civil parish in Bedfordshire, England.

Dunstable may also refer to:

== People ==
- John Dunstaple (c. 1390 – 1453) English composer (often spelled Dunstable)

== Places ==
- Dunstable, Massachusetts, town in Middlesex County, Massachusetts, US
- Dunnstable Township, Pennsylvania, township in Clinton County, Pennsylvania, US
