= Robert F. Rich =

American politician (1883–1968)

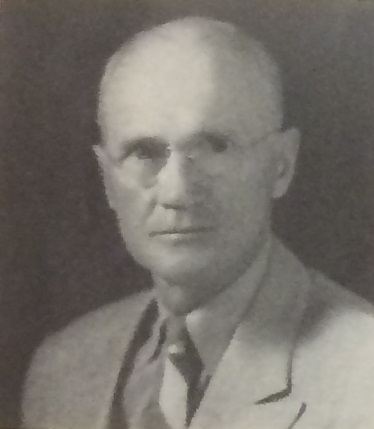
- From 1949's Pictorial Directory of the 81st Congress

Member of the U.S. House of Representatives from Pennsylvania
- In office January 3, 1945 – January 3, 1951
- Preceded by: Wilson D. Gillette
- Succeeded by: Alvin Bush
- Constituency: 15th district
- In office November 4, 1930 – January 3, 1943
- Preceded by: Edgar R. Kiess
- Succeeded by: Thomas E. Scanlon
- Constituency: 16th district

Personal details
- Born: June 23, 1883 Woolrich, Pennsylvania
- Died: April 28, 1968 (aged 84) Jersey Shore, Pennsylvania
- Party: Republican

Robert Fleming Rich (June 23, 1883 – April 28, 1968) was a Republican member of the U.S. House of Representatives from Pennsylvania.

== Early life and education ==
Robert F. Rich was born in Woolrich, Pennsylvania. He attended Dickinson Seminary in Williamsport, PA, and the Williamsport Commercial College. He graduated from the Mercersburg Academy in 1902 and attended Dickinson College in Carlisle, PA, from 1903 to 1906.

== Commercial enterprises ==
Rich was engaged in the woolen-mills business in 1906. He was also engaged in banking and became financially interested in various business and manufacturing enterprises. He was a delegate to the Republican National Conventions in 1924, 1952, and 1956. He was a member of the board of trustees of Dickinson College from 1912 to 1958, of the Lock Haven Teachers College from 1918 to 1928, and of the Lock Haven Hospital from 1920 to 1951. He was an important supporter of Lycoming College and a member of its board of trustees from 1931 to 1963.

== United States House of Representatives ==
Rich was against allying the US with the USSR, saying that it would akin to "get in bed with a rattlesnake and a skunk".

Rich was elected as a Republican to the 71st Congress to fill the vacancy caused by the death of Edgar R. Kiess. He was reelected to the 72nd Congress and to the five succeeding Congresses. According to Christopher Manion, Rich:

became famous – and wildly popular – during the New Deal for one question, which he insisted on asking on the floor of the House of Representatives every time a new spending bill was taken up: "Where are we going to get the money," he would roar. It was such a constant refrain that the other members of the House would often join in like a chorus – alas, only in jest: they knew where they would get the money – they would print it.

During Congressional consideration of Lend-Lease in early 1941, Rich was among the bill's most vocal opponents in the House, along with Hamilton Fish III and Roy Woodruff, among others. Speaking often during the debates, Rich became somewhat notorious for longer speeches and belligerent statements, especially in opposition to President Franklin D. Roosevelt. During one particular address on February 4, 1941, Rich infamously declared:

I do not care what the people in my district think. If I received a telegram tomorrow from everybody in my district wanting me to vote for this bill, I would resign my job in Congress before I would vote for it.

In the same address, Rich went on to disparage aliens residing in the United States as being potentially dangerous fifth columnists, arguing that all of them should be forced to swear allegiance to the United States, be shipped back to their home countries, or else "we ought to put them into concentration camps."

He did not seek renomination in 1942, but was again elected to the Seventy-ninth, Eightieth, and Eighty-first Congresses. He was not a candidate for renomination in 1950.

== Woolrich Woolen Mills ==
He served as general manager of the Woolrich Woolen Mills from 1930 to 1959, president from 1959 to 1964, and chairman of the board from 1964 until 1966 when he became honorary chairman. He died at Jersey Shore, Pennsylvania, and is interred in Woolrich Cemetery.

== Sources ==
- United States Congress. "Robert F. Rich (id: R000209)". Biographical Directory of the United States Congress.
- The Political Graveyard

U.S. House of Representatives
Preceded by Edgar R. Kiess	Member of the U.S. House of Representatives from Pennsylvania's 16th congressional district 1930–1943	Succeeded by Thomas E. Scanlon
Preceded by Wilson D. Gillette	Member of the U.S. House of Representatives from Pennsylvania's 15th congressional district 1945–1951	Succeeded by Alvin Bush
