= Woolrich =

American outdoor clothing company

- Type: Private
- Industry: Outdoor apparel
- Founded: 1830 in Woolrich, Pennsylvania
- Founder: John Rich
- Headquarters: Bologna, Italy
- Number of locations: Europe and North America
- Area served: International
- Key people: Stefano Saccone (chairman of the board); Nicholas Brayton (former president March ‘12-May‘19)
- Products: Outdoor apparel; blankets
- Revenue: US$ 250 million (2013)
- Website: www.woolrich.com

Woolrich, Inc. (/ˈwʊlrɪtʃ/ WUUL-ritch) is an American luxury outdoor clothing company founded in Woolrich, Pennsylvania, in 1830.

Lorenzo Flamini, the company's former CFO, was promoted to CEO in February 2025. The company was acquired in December 2025 by BasicNet group, a Turin, Italy-based company.

== History ==
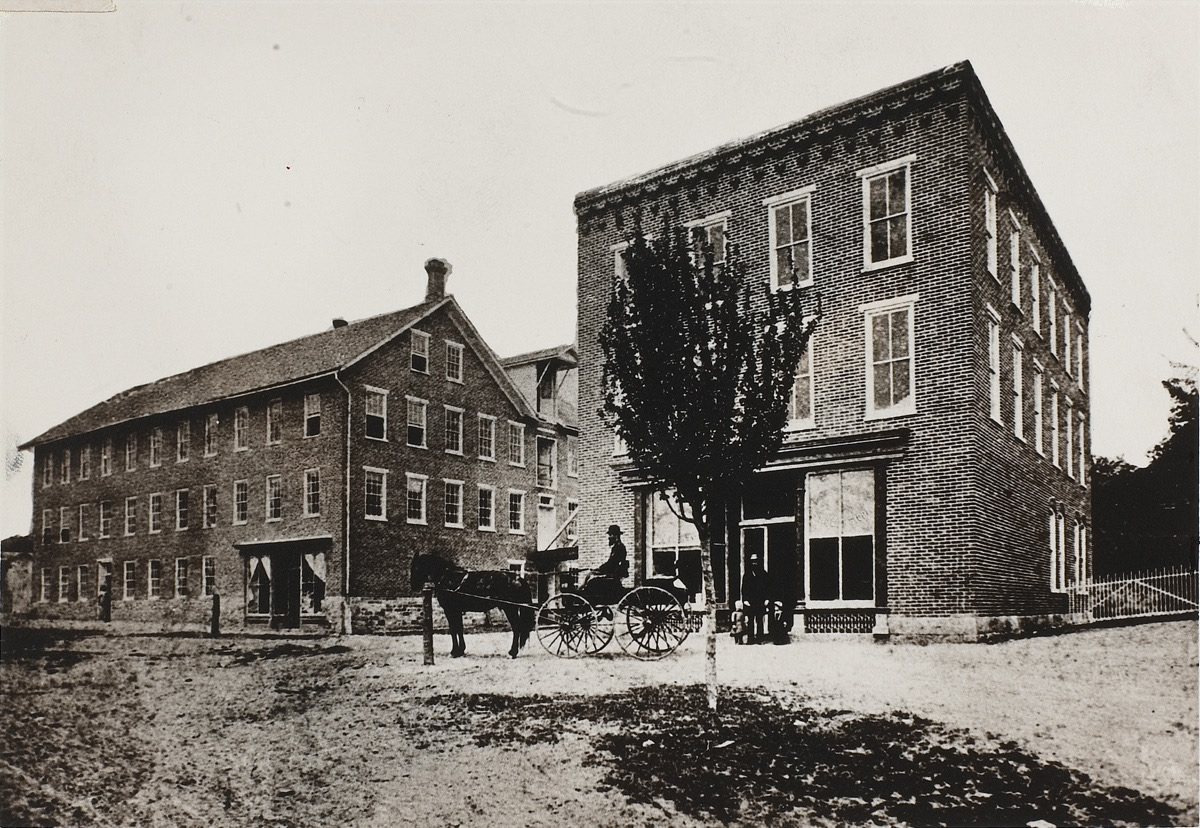
Woolrich factory in 1887.

Woolrich, Inc., founded in 1830 by John Rich and Daniel McCormick, is the oldest manufacturer of outdoor wear in the United States. The company was founded for the purpose of manufacturing fabric for the wives of hunters, loggers and trappers. Later, the company also outfitted clothing supplies to the American Civil War. and Richard E. Byrd's 1939–1940 Antarctic expedition.

The 1830 wool mill was located on Little Plum Run in Dunnstable Township, Pennsylvania. Wool production stopped there around 1843–1845 because of insufficient water supply. The company bought 300 acres at Chatham's Run in nearby Pine Creek Township in 1834 and built a sawmill. Rich bought out McCormick's interest in 1843, and by 1845 the company moved to a new mill at the Chatham's Run location. The 1845 mill no longer exists in its original configuration but its location remains the site of Woolrich's main operations, which developed into a company town now known as Woolrich, Pennsylvania. The 1830 mill was later used for storage and residential purposes; known as the Rich-McCormick Woolen Factory, it was added to the National Register of Historic Places in 1985.

Another member of the Rich family, Robert F. Rich, headed Woolrich for many years and was also a longtime Republican member of the U.S. House of Representatives. Serving 18 years between 1931 and 1951, he became known as a vocal opponent of the New Deal and (like many other members of his family) an important supporter of Lycoming College.

After camping grew popular in the 1970s, Woolrich suffered in the 1980s due to other companies wanting to compete. For many years, their competitors have been L.L.Bean, Eddie Bauer, the Timberland Company, the North Face, Patagonia and Columbia Sportswear. In 1990, Woolrich let go of half of their 2,600 employees nationwide by then-president S. Wade Judy due to fewer orders. That same year, the company also closed six plants in Pennsylvania, Nebraska and Colorado for about five years and outsourced the work to Mexico, leaving them with about 1,400 employees. Since then, the employment numbers have continued changing, with about 500 as of 2008 and about 200 in 2013. In 1998, Woolrich provided the clothing used in the film The Horse Whisperer.

In 2007, the company's long-time president and CEO, Roswell Brayton, Jr., died after collapsing at the Woolrich headquarters. He was a sixth generation member of the Rich family and joined the company in 1977 and became president in 1996 and CEO the next year. The former president, Nick Brayton, and vice president Joshua Rich, represented the seventh and eighth generations of the Rich family to serve in the management of the company. In January 2013, John Ranelli was named president and CEO of Central Garden & Pet Company and retained his "non-executive" chairman of the board title at Woolrich. In May, the company announced they had plans to move more of their workforce to the United States.

In September 2013, Woolrich partnered with Portland Product Werks (PPW) to manufacture shoes, a new line for Woolrich. PPW is led by Sean Beers, a former employee of Columbia Sportwear, a Woolrich competitor. They debuted the Woolrich footwear line at the Salt Lake City Outdoor Retailer Winter Market in January 2014, Las Vegas in February and in Fall 2014 in New York.

In 2014, Woolrich collaborated with Dogfish Head Brewery by releasing the limited edition Pennsylvania Tuxedo, a spruce-enhanced pale ale. In 2015, the company celebrated and achieved its 185-year anniversary with an art gallery show at its store in New York.

In 2016, Italian company W.P. Lavori, which had previously licensed the Woolrich name for the European market as John Rich & Bros., agreed to acquire a majority stake in the company. The move consolidated the European licensing operations with the company in the U.S., forming Woolrich International. Goldwin Inc., a Japanese company, also acquired a portion of the newly created company.

In September 2018, the company announced it would permanently close its last plant in the United States, in Woolrich, Pennsylvania. It was also announced that the majority stake of W.P. Lavori was being sold to L-GAM Advisors, a private equity firm.

As of 2023, the three stores remaining in North America are in Woolrich, Pennsylvania; SoHo, New York City; and Woodbury, New York. In Europe, the brand has stores in Germany, Italy, and The Netherlands.

In November 2023, Woolrich appointed Todd Snyder as the Creative Director of its new Black Label premium collection.

In January 2025, Woolrich presented its Fall 2025 menswear collection at Milan Fashion Week.

On October 18, 2025, Target issued a collaboration with Woolrich which almost immediately sold out. In December of that year, the company announced it had been acquired by Italian-based company BasicNet.

== In popular culture ==
Woolrich has appeared in films including: Dumb and Dumber, Lassie, The Perfect Storm, The Patriot, Dr. Dolittle 2, and War of the Worlds.

== See also ==
- Pendleton Woolen Mills
- Faribault Woolen Mill Company
- L.L.Bean
- Eddie Bauer
- The Timberland Company
- Filson
