= Jersey Shore Steel =

Jersey Shore Steel Company is a family-owned company based in Jersey Shore, Lycoming County, Pennsylvania in the United States, principally manufacturing rail steel.

It was founded in 1938, near the end of the Great Depression by John A. Schultz. The mill was set up in the former New York Central locomotive shop in Avis, across Pine Creek from Jersey Shore. The company began manufacturing steel rails for the railroad industry. In its first year of business, Jersey Shore Steel was able to produce 15,000 tons of rail steel. When John A. Schultz died in 1943, the business was passed on to his sons Charles and John A. Jr. The brothers oversaw expansion and devastation. A massive fire nearly destroyed the steel mill in 1963, and the Agnes Flood of the West Branch Susquehanna River valley caused tremendous amounts of damage in 1972. The company which is owned by a third generation of the Schultz family operates two mills, the original mill in Avis and a second mill in Lycoming County at Montoursville. It is capable of producing 170,000 tons of rail steel annually. The rail steel produced by Jersey Shore Steel can be used as door supports, fence posts, sign stands, barricade legs, shelving supports, orchard posts, and vineyard stakes.

Many of the products produced by Jersey Shore Steel reach their destination via the Lycoming Valley Railroad, a short line that operates 38 miles of track in Lycoming and Clinton along track that was formerly owned by Conrail and the Reading and New York Central Railroads.
