= Henry W. Shoemaker =

American historian

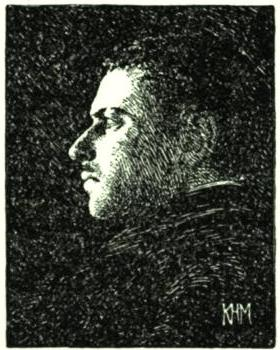
- Shoemaker, c. 1914

U.S. Minister to Bulgaria
- In office March 28, 1930 – August 2, 1933
- Appointed by: Herbert Hoover
- Preceded by: H. F. Arthur Schoenfeld
- Succeeded by: Frederick A. Sterling

Personal details
- Born: Henry Wharton Shoemaker; February 24, 1880 New York City, New York, U.S.
- Died: July 14, 1958 (aged 78) Pennsylvania, U.S.
- Spouses: Beatrice Genevieve Barclay (m. 1907, divorced) Mabelle Ruth Ord (m. 1913)
- Relations: Blanche Shoemaker Wagstaff (sister)
- Children: Henry Francis Shoemaker II
- Parent(s): Henry Francis Shoemaker; Blanche Quiggle Shoemaker
- Education: Columbia University

Henry Wharton Shoemaker (February 24, 1880 – July 14, 1958) was a prominent American folklorist, historian, diplomat, writer, publisher, and conservationist.

== Early life, family, and career ==
Shoemaker was born in New York City, but was closely associated with Pennsylvania, where he spent summers in childhood and took up residence later in life. His father, Henry Francis Shoemaker (1845–1918), was a railroad magnate, investment banker, and close confidante of future senator and vice presidential candidate Charles W. Fairbanks. His mother, Blanche Quiggle, was the sole daughter of railroad magnate and diplomat Col. James W. Quiggle of Philadelphia and Lock Haven, Pennsylvania. He attended the E. D. Lyons Classical School and Columbia University. He then served in the military and attained the rank of Colonel. Attracted to foreign service, he worked in European embassies before returning home to enter a brokerage venture with his brother William. His brother died in an elevator accident, and Henry closed the brokerage.

== Preservationist, Progressive, and pressman ==
Shoemaker summered in McElhattan, Pennsylvania, at an estate called "Restless Oaks" owned by his mother's family, and wrote that this experience deeply influenced his lifelong devotion to folklore and legend, hunting heritage, and historical and environmental preservation. Familiar with the Roosevelt family in New York, he was a supporter of Theodore Roosevelt's calls for the values of strenuosity, conservation, and Progressivism. Shoemaker, for example, founded the Alpine Club in Pennsylvania to encourage mountain climbing and hiking, and wrote one of the first tourist guides to the natural wonders of Pennsylvania in Eldorado Found (1917).

After his brief stint on Wall Street, Shoemaker turned to publishing, running newspapers in Reading, Altoona, and Jersey Shore, Pennsylvania. He was also an active writer, which he had begun in student publications at Columbia. He gained notice as a journalist after 1898, when he reported legends from Pennsylvania mountain residents and workers in lumber and hunting camps and coalfields, which he first published in central Pennsylvania newspapers and then more widely in the book Pennsylvania Mountain Stories (1908). This was the first of twelve volumes in the Pennsylvania Folklore Series (1908–1924) that promoted the culture and landscape of central Pennsylvania.

From his maternal home in McElhattan which he inherited, Shoemaker devoted much of his energy to environmental conservation and considered folklore associated with the endangered landscape deserving of preservation along with the state's forests and wildlife. In this campaign associated with the Progressive movement, he became involved as a campaign writer for Gifford Pinchot's runs for U.S. Senator (1914, 1926) and Governor (1923, 1931). Pinchot appointed Shoemaker as chair of the Pennsylvania Historical Commission (1923–1930) and various state boards for environmental and historical preservation. Serving as campaign manager for Herbert Hoover's presidential campaign in Pennsylvania in 1929, Shoemaker was later appointed by Hoover to be US minister to Bulgaria (1930–1933).

== Folklore and conservation work ==
Praised for drawing attention in his creative writing to the traditions of the Pennsylvania "mountaineers", Shoemaker nonetheless drew criticism for his alteration and occasional fabrication of legends. His goal, he announced, was to show the legacy of legends for landscape features such as trees, animals, caves and caverns, rivers, and mountains; by making people realizing the spiritual narratives associated with the environment he hoped to make them more respectful and conservation-minded. An example is his publication of the legend of Princess Nit-a-Nee, supposedly connected to the Nittany Mountains in Centre County; the legend has been perpetuated in many tourist brochures for sites to the present day such as Penn's Cavern and the Pennsylvania State University.

Shoemaker's humanistic interests in his creative writing also showed in his campaign to have artists use local folklore as a resource for literature, poetry, art, and music. A prolific writer, he produced more than 100 books and pamphlets and hundreds of articles. In addition to his books of legends such as Susquehanna Legends, In the Seven Mountains, Penn's Grandest Cavern, Tales of the Bald Eagle Mountains, Allegheny Episodes, Juniata Memories, North Mountain Mementos, South Mountain Sketches, Black Forest Souvenirs, for which he is best known, he published more ethnographic field collections of songs and ballads (Mountain Minstrelsy of Pennsylvania, 1931), folk speech (Scotch-Irish and English Proverbs and Sayings of the West Branch Valley of Central Pennsylvania, 1927), and crafts (Early Potters of Clinton County, 1916). He also wrote some of the earliest accounts of hunting and animal lore, such as Pennsylvania Deer and Their Horns (1915), Pennsylvania Lion or Panther (1914), Wolf Days in Pennsylvania (1914), and Stories of Great Pennsylvania Hunters (1913).

== First state folklorist ==
In 1924, he cofounded the Pennsylvania Folklore Society with Bishop J.H. Darlington, and he was its president from 1930 until 1957. From 1924 to 1932, he published a series of monographs for the society. While he was minister to Bulgaria from 1930 to 1933, he took notice of Bulgaria's official efforts to preserve its folklore that he thought could be applied to the United States.

Upon his return to the United States, he began a daily column for the Altoona Tribune, which he had purchased in 1912, in which he covered regional folklore and history and called for cultural conservation efforts. He had an opportunity to develop his plans when he was appointed state archivist of Pennsylvania from 1937 to 1948 and director of the State Museum in Harrisburg from 1939 to 1940. In the posts, he called for the state to sponsor collection and preservation of folklore in addition to keeping the state's documentary record.

After the archives, museum, and historical commission merged to form the Pennsylvania Historical and Museum Commission following World War II, he oversaw the creation of the Division of Folklore in the commission in 1948 and took the position of the nation's first state folklorist. Over forty states now have comparable positions. In the post, Shoemaker sponsored publications, meetings, festivals, and exhibits, although he entered into bitter disputes with academic folklorists in Pennsylvania over his popularized presentations of folklore.

Shoemaker left the post in 1956, retiring to Restless Oaks. Shoemaker died shortly thereafter near his McElhattan home in 1958. Many of his papers are located in repositories at the Pennsylvania State University, State Archives of Pennsylvania, and Juniata College (where a Shoemaker Gallery is named after him).

== Personal life ==
In 1907, Shoemaker was married to Beatrice Genevieve Barclay (1888–1974), a daughter of George Bartholf Barclay and Elizabeth Jane (née Shaffer) Barclay. Before their divorce, they were the parents of:

- Henry Francis Shoemaker II (1908–1974)

He married, secondly, to Mabelle Ruth Ord (1878–1967) of San Francisco on May 10, 1913. Mabelle was a daughter of Robert Brent Ord and Eliza (née Good) Ord and the niece of Gen. Edward Ord for whom Fort Ord in California is named. As a wedding present, his mother gave them a $250,000 house at 21 West 53rd Street in Manhattan that was previously owned by Florence C. Eno Graves and was designed by C. P. H. Gilbert.

Shoemaker died on July 14, 1958, in Williamsport, Pennsylvania, near his McElhattan home.
