= WXPI =

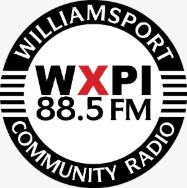
- Jersey Shore, Pennsylvania; United States
- Broadcast area: North Central Pennsylvania
- Frequency: 88.5 MHz
- Branding: Williamsport Community Radio

Programming
- Format: community radio
- Affiliations: Pacifica Radio Network

Ownership
- Owner: Williamsport Independent Media, Inc.

History
- First air date: 2011
- Last air date: February 2026

Technical information
- Licensing authority: FCC
- Facility ID: 175293
- Class: A
- ERP: 95 watts
- HAAT: 190 meters (620 ft)
- Transmitter coordinates: 41°12′8″N 77°16′15″W

Links
- Public license information: Public file; LMS
- Website: wxpiradio.org

WXPI (88.5 FM), was an independent, non-commercial, listener-supported community radio station in Jersey Shore, Pennsylvania. The station, which served the North Central Pennsylvania area, aired a mix of news, public affairs, and music programming.

Licensed by the FCC in 2011, WXPI is affiliated with Pacifica Radio, while its local programming is staffed entirely by volunteers. The station is owned by Williamsport Independent Media, Inc., which publishes the Williamsport Guardian, the region's alternative newspaper.

In 2025, Williamsport Independent Media sold the license for the original WXPI to Family Life Ministries, owner of the Family Life Network, for $20,000. This allowed it to build and operate a construction permit for a new low-power FM radio station in Williamsport. After the purchase, Family Life immediately shut the facility down so that it could apply to upgrade Family Life transmitter WCOB (FM) at State College.
