= Jersey Shore Historic District =

Historic district in Pennsylvania, United States

- U.S. National Register of Historic Places
- U.S. Historic district
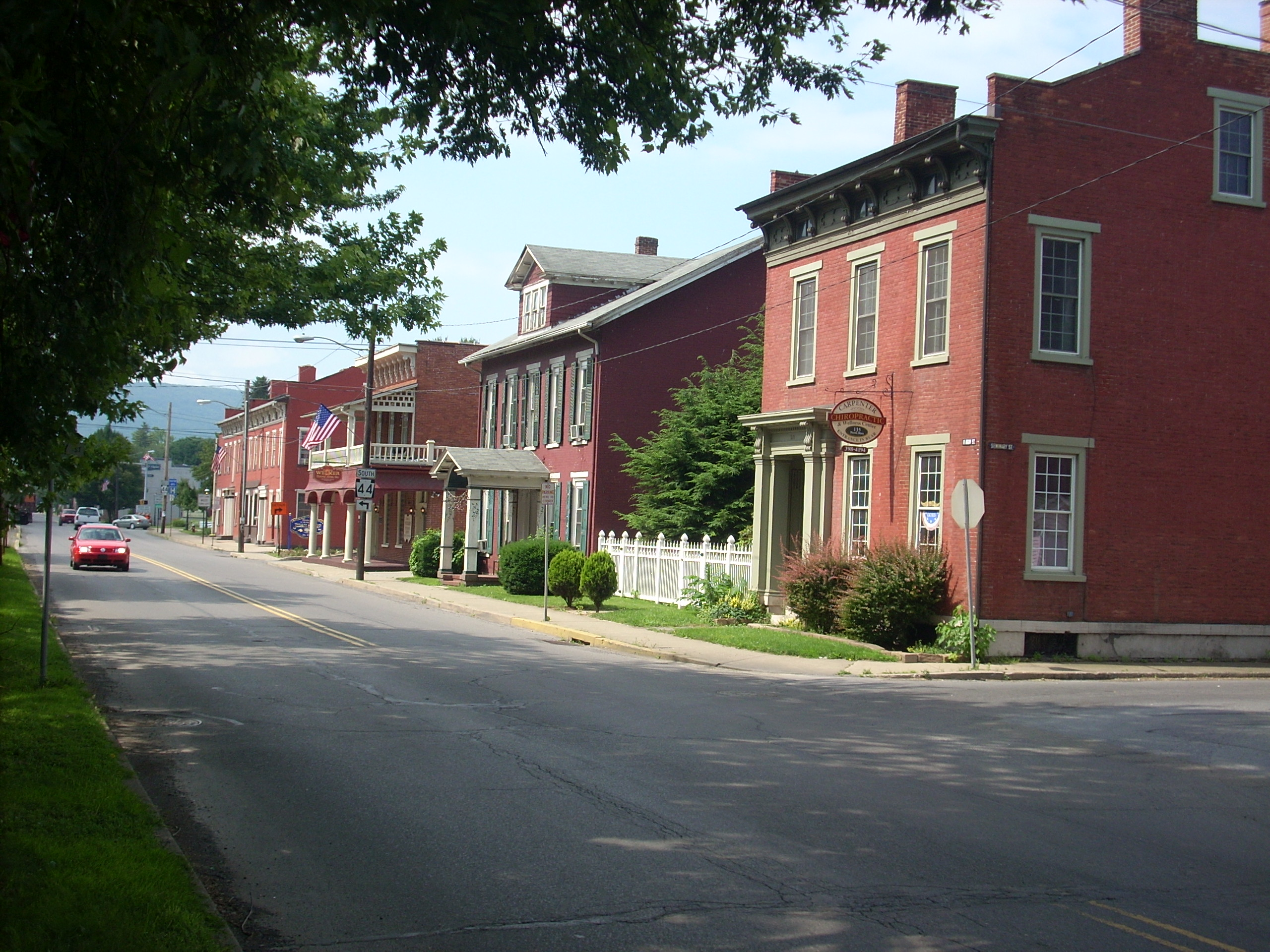
- Jersey Shore Historic District, June 2009

- Location within Pennsylvania Location within the United States
- Location: Irregular shape roughly bounded by Lawshe Run, W. Branch Susquehanna River, S borough boundaries, and Tomb Ave., Jersey Shore, Pennsylvania
- Coordinates: 41°12′4″N 77°15′18″W
- Area: 150 acres (61 ha)
- Built by: Alexander Smith (Humes building)
- Architectural style: Late Victorian, Greek Revival, Federal
- NRHP reference No.: 75001653
- Added to NRHP: March 31, 1975

The Jersey Shore Historic District is a national historic district located in Jersey Shore, Lycoming County, Pennsylvania. The district encompasses 286 contributing buildings in the central business district and surrounding residential area of Jersey Shore. Most were built during the period 1830 to 1860, and are representative of Victorian, Greek Revival, and Federal style architecture.

It was added to the National Register of Historic Places in 1975.

== History ==
The Borough of Jersey Shore had its beginnings in pre-Revolutionary War days, according to newspaper accounts of the town's history.

Dean R. Wagner, who prepared the form which helped secure the Jersey Shore Historic District's placement on the National Register of Historic Places, the present day Borough of Jersey Shore, Pennsylvania confirmed in 1975 that the town is located on lands which were part of initial land grants made to 17th and 18th-century settlers along the western branch of the Susquehanna River, roughly 15 miles south of what is, today, the city of Williamsport in Lycoming County. Those land grants, from north to south, were: Forrest Situate, Richmond Situate, Richland Situate, and Forge Hammer. A portion of Forrest Situate was then subsequently purchased by Jeremiah and Reuben Manning who, sometime around the year 1800, had left the shore of New Jersey where they were residing to relocate to Pennsylvania. After purchasing their land, they then laid out a town north of what is, today, Allegheny Street, and initially named their new town Waynesburg. That year, there were just four houses inside the town's boundaries, but the town was ripe for expansion because there were multiple businesses located outside of town, including lumber and flour mills.

Twelve years later, William B. Smith purchased land south of what is now Allegheny Street, and laid out a new section of town there in 1813. Initially reachable by wagon and stagecoach, the town became even more accessible when it became a stop on the West Branch Canal in 1834. Further growth was impeded during the mid-1800s, however, when planners chose to build the incoming railroad on the other side of the river, rather than closer to or through the town.

The name of the town was officially changed to Jersey Shore in 1826.

== Notable architecture ==
Notable buildings include:

- Abraham Lawshe House (c. 1840), which was the home of the owner of Jersey Shore's largest tannery
- Gallagher-Webb House (c. 1842)
- Mark Slonaker House (c. 1845), which was the home of one of the men who collaborated on the construction of a pig iron furnace on the Upper Pine Bottom Run in 1814
- Stone-Nice House (c. 1845)
- Bailey-Allen House (c. 1850)
- Sanderson-Sebring House (c. 1852)
- Samuel Humes Building (1852), which was named in honor of a member of the board of directors of both the Jersey Shore National Bank and the Lewisburg Turnpike and Bridge Company
- Moran-Trump House (1855)
- West Branch Dormitory Building (1856)
- McHenry-Cline House (c. 1885).
