= Rich-McCormick Woolen Factory =

- U.S. National Register of Historic Places
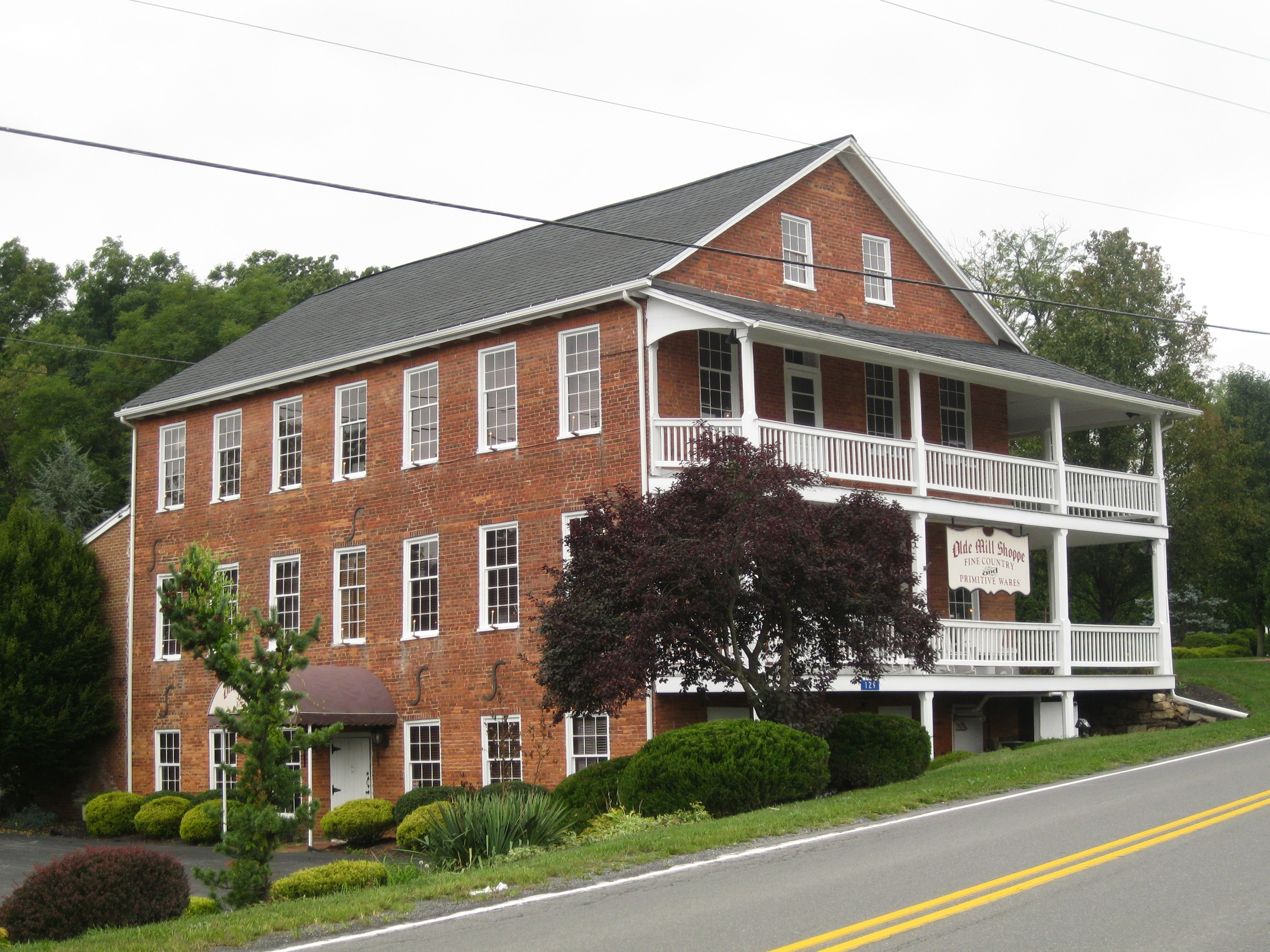
- Rich-McCormick Woolen Factory, September 2012

- Location within Pennsylvania Location within the United States
- Location: Little Plum Run Road, Dunnstable Township, Pennsylvania
- Coordinates: 41°10′17″N 77°22′16″W
- Area: 1.5 acres (0.61 ha)
- Built: 1830
- NRHP reference No.: 85001959
- Added to NRHP: September 5, 1985

The Rich-McCormick Woolen Factory is an historic woolen mill in Dunnstable Township in Clinton County, Pennsylvania, United States.

It was listed on the National Register of Historic Places in 1985.

== History and architectural features ==
Built in 1830, this historic structure is a three-story, brick building that sits on a coursed stone foundation, has a gable roof, and measures thirty-two feet by fifty feet, six inches, and four bays by seven bays. It was built as a woolen mill and remained in operation until 1845, after which it was used for storage. The building was converted to residential use in 1930.

== See also ==
Woolrich
