= Woolrich, Pennsylvania =

Unincorporated community in Pennsylvania, US

- Unincorporated community
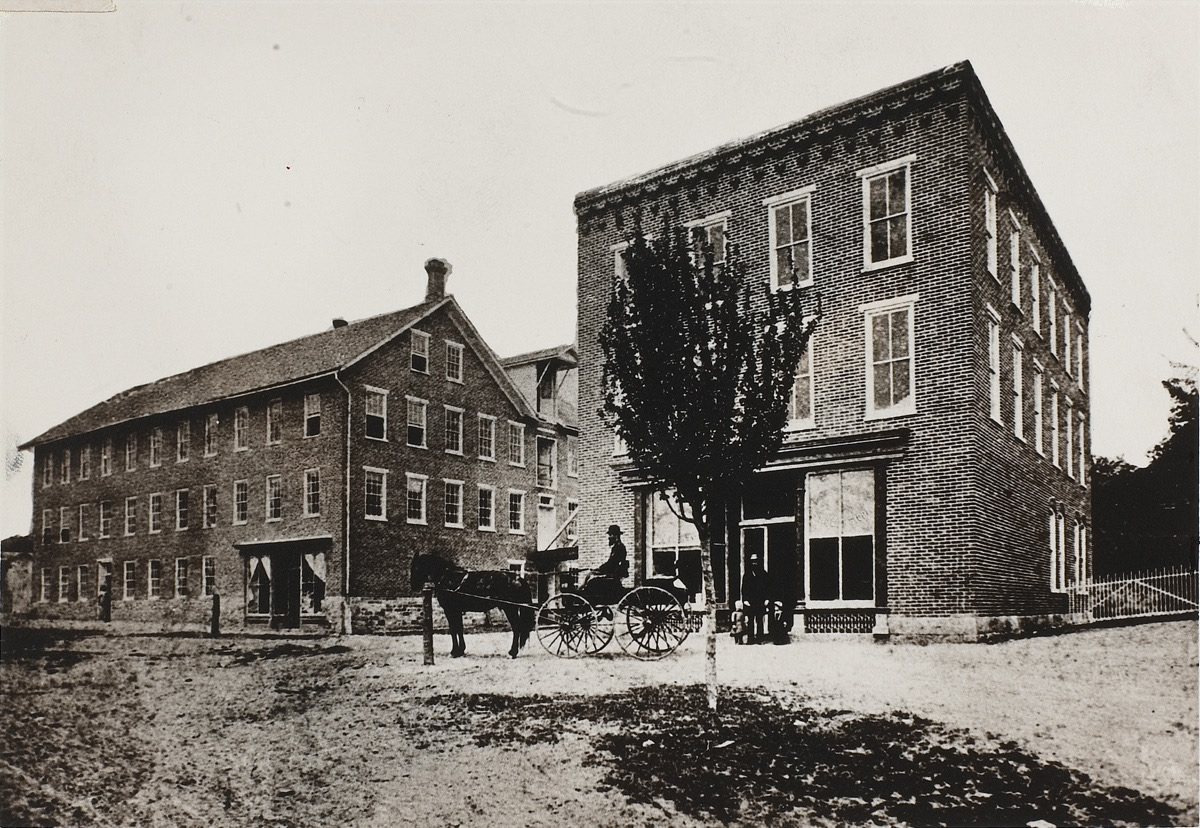
- Factory c. 1887

- Location within Pennsylvania Location within the United States
- Coordinates: 41°12′28″N 77°22′19″W
- Country: United States
- State: Pennsylvania
- County: Clinton
- Township: Pine Creek
- Established: 1834
- Elevation: 725 ft (221 m)
- Time zone: UTC-5 (Eastern (EST))
  - Summer (DST): UTC-4 (EDT)
- ZIP: 17779
- Area codes: 570 and 272
- GNIS feature ID: 1191785

Woolrich (/ˈwʊlrɪtʃ/ WUUL-ritch) is an unincorporated community in Pine Creek Township, Clinton County, Pennsylvania, United States. Its elevation is 725 feet (221 m), and it is located at 41°12′28″N 77°22′19″W (41.1911819, 77.3720595).

Woolrich is a company town, the home of Woolrich, Inc., a family-owned clothing company. The company was founded in 1830 by John Rich and Daniel McCormick, and originally located at a mill on Little Plum Run in nearby Dunnstable Township. By 1834, Rich and McCormick decided to move their operations to a location with a better water supply at Chatham's Run in Pine Creek Township. They bought 300 acres and first built a sawmill; around 1845 the company (by then solely owned by John Rich) relocated to a new mill at the Chatham's Run location. This 1845 mill no longer exists in its original configuration, but its location remains the site of Woolrich's main operations and its surrounding community. The town was first called Factoryville, later Richville, and after 1888 was named Woolrich.

John Rich began his business by selling wool to lumberjacks and their families who were located in the mountains of central Pennsylvania. The wool was used to make clothing and socks for the lumberjacks. Lumber was the primary source of income for most people who lived in this region. Hence the lumber barons' major homes in Williamsport, Pennsylvania called Millionaires Row. The woolen mill that was started was one of the businesses that sprang up to support the lumber industry. Woolrich Inc., though it does not make its clothes in the local factory, still manufactures blankets and fabric there, including those used in the U.S. military.

In 2014 Woolrich Inc. partnered with a Delaware brewery, Dogfish Head to manufacture beer made from pine trees and introduced the black-and-red checkered pattern that is one of Woolrich's signature patterns in their logo.

== Notable person ==
Robert F. Rich, who headed the Woolrich company for many years and was also a Republican member of the U.S. House of Representatives for 18 years between 1931 and 1951, was born in Woolrich.
