= Wayne Township, Clinton County, Pennsylvania =

Township in Pennsylvania, US

Coordinates: 41°07′27″N 77°19′59″W

- Township
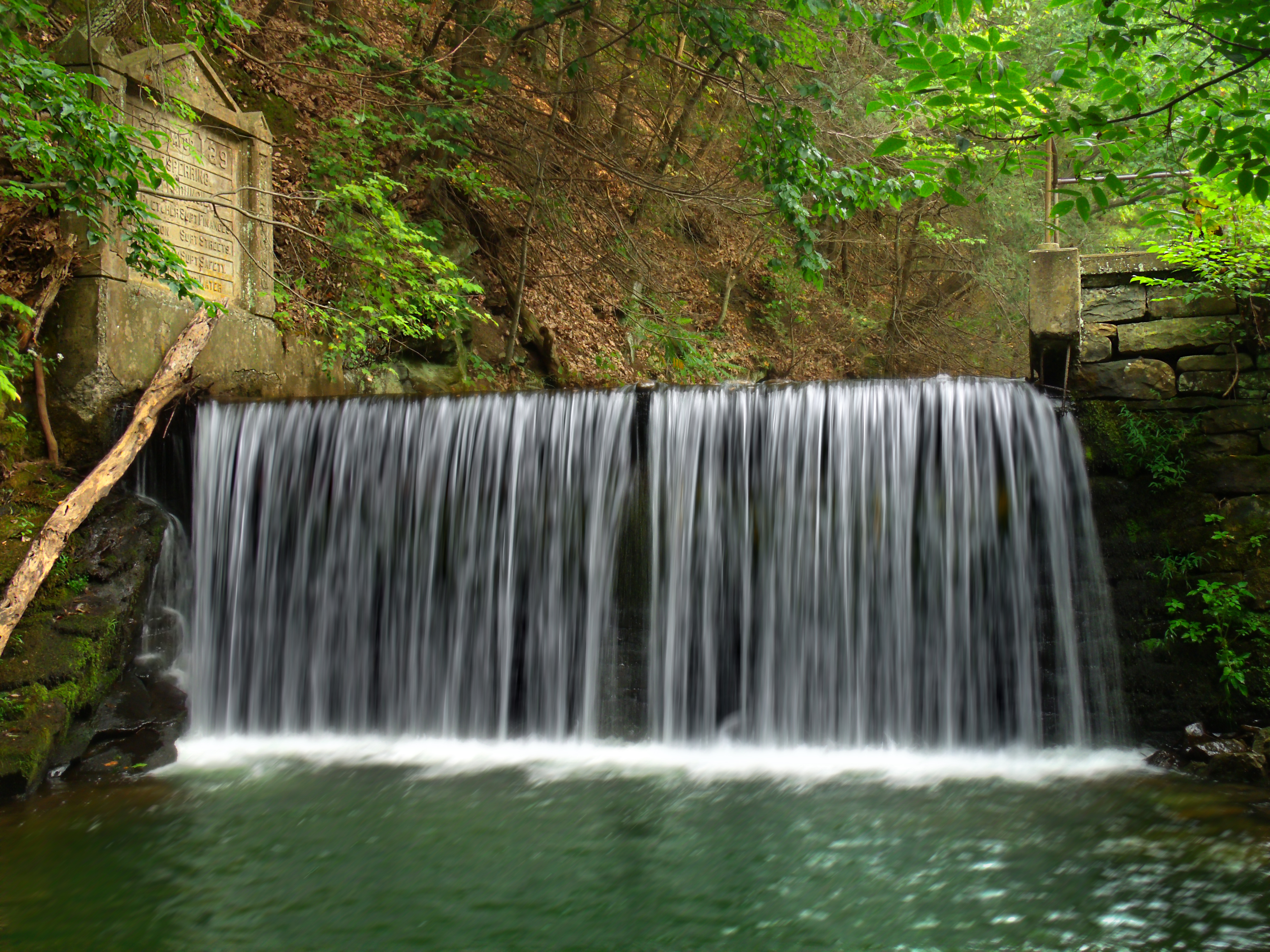
- Small dam on McElhattan Creek, Wayne Township, Clinton County, within Zindel Park

- Flag Seal

- Location in Clinton County and the state of Pennsylvania.
- Country: United States
- State: Pennsylvania
- County: Clinton
- Settled: 1768
- Incorporated: Before 1839

Area
  - Total: 22.86 sq mi (59.21 km^{2})
  - Land: 22.31 sq mi (57.79 km^{2})
  - Water: 0.55 sq mi (1.42 km^{2})

Population (2020)
  - Total: 1,476 ▼
  - Estimate (2021): 1,478
  - Density: 76/sq mi (29.3/km^{2})
- FIPS code: 42-035-81728
- Website: wayne-township.com

Wayne Township is a township in Clinton County, Pennsylvania, United States. As of the 2020 census, the township had a population of 1,476, down from 1,666 in 2010.

== Geography ==
Wayne Township is in southeastern Clinton County and is bordered on the east by Lycoming County. The West Branch Susquehanna River forms the winding northern border of the township. The unincorporated community of McElhattan is in the north, along the West Branch. U.S. Route 220, a four-lane freeway, passes through the township, with access from one exit. US 220 leads west 6 miles (10 km) to Lock Haven, the county seat, and east 7 miles (11 km) to Jersey Shore.

According to the United States Census Bureau, the township has a total area of 22.9 square miles (59.2 km^{2})of which 22.3 square miles (57.8 km^{2}) is land and 0.54 square miles (1.4 km^{2}), or 2.40%, is water.

== Demographics ==
Historical population
Census	Pop.	Note	%±
1980	728		—
1990	782		7.4%
2000	1,363		74.3%
2010	1,666		22.2%
2020	1,476		−11.4%
2021 (est.)	1,478		0.1%

As of the census of 2000, there were 1,363 people, 477 households, and 353 families residing in the township. The population density was 23.6/km^{2} (61.1/sq mi). There were 496 housing units at an average density of 8.6/km^{2} (22.2/sq mi). The racial makeup of the township was 98.17% White, 1.32% African American, 0.15% Asian, 0.07% from other races, and 0.29% from two or more races. 0.51% of the population were Hispanic or Latino of any race.

There were 477 households, out of which 27.0% had children under the ageof 18 living with them, 65.0% were married couples living together, 4.6% had a female householder with no husband present, and 25.8% were non-families. 20.1% of all households were made up of individuals, and 10.3% had someone living alone who was 65 years of age or older. The average household size was 2.53 and the average family size was 2.93.

In the township the population was spread out, with 19.7% under the age of 18, 10.8% from 18 to 24, 31.0% from 25 to 44, 24.4% from 45 to 64, and 14.1% who were 65 years of age or older. The median age was 38 years. For every 100 females, there were 118.4 males. For every 100 females age18 and over, there were 123.3 males.

The median income for a household in the township was $35,417, and the median income for a family was $42,895. Males had a median income of $27,054 versus $20,380 for females. The per capita income for the township was $16,785. 6.3% of the population and 3.1% of families were below the poverty line. Out of the total population, 7.0% of those under the age of 18 and 3.2% of those 65 and older were living below the poverty line.
