= Henry F. Shoemaker =

American railroad magnate and financier

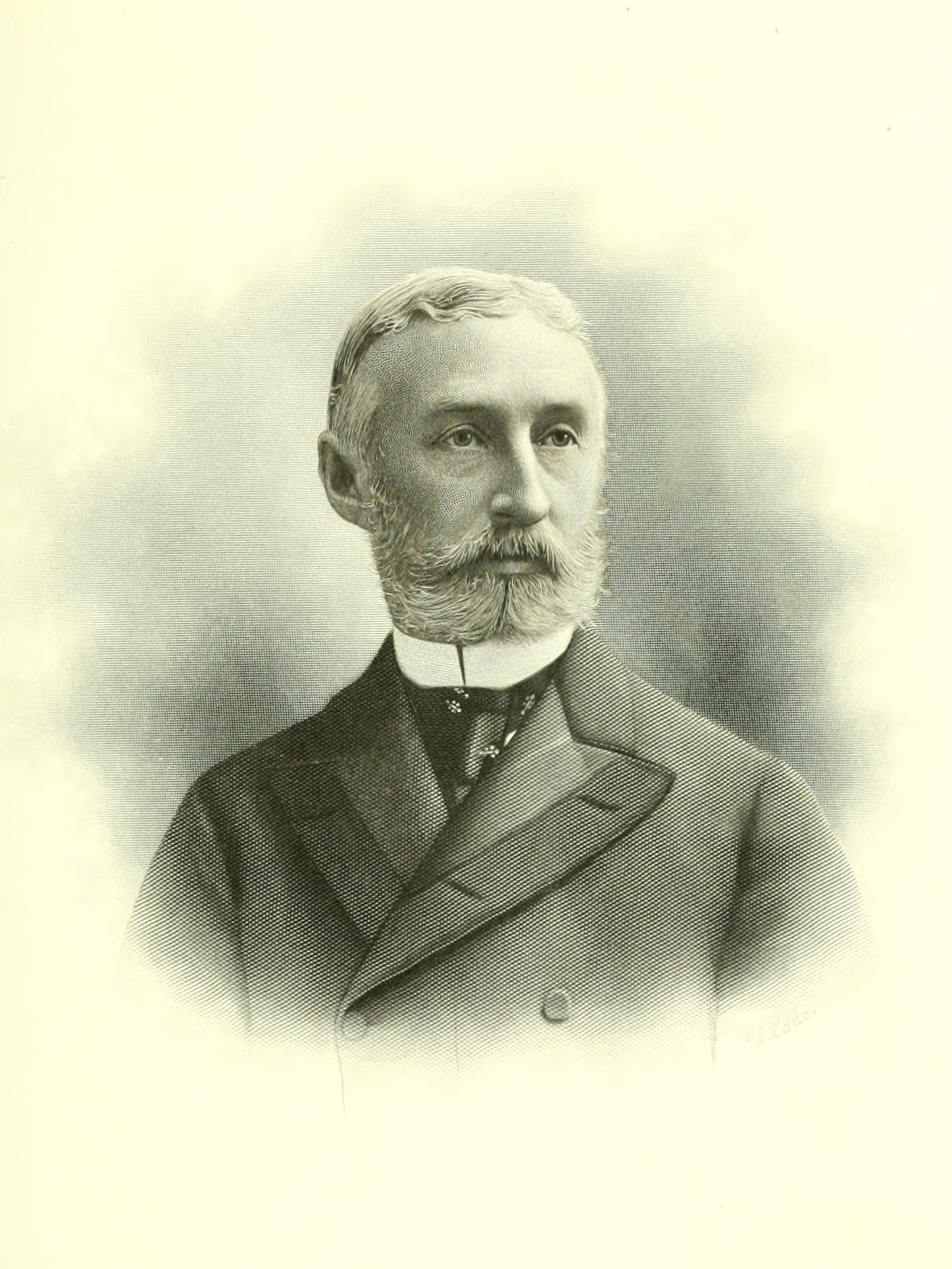
- Born: Henry Francis Shoemaker; March 28, 1843; Orwigsburg, Pennsylvania
- Died: July 2, 1918 (aged 75); Riverside, Connecticut
- Education: Genesee Seminary
- Spouse: Blanche Quiggle (m. 1874)
- Children: Henry Wharton Shoemaker; William Brock Shoemaker; Blanche Shoemaker Wagstaff
- Parent(s): John Wise Shoemaker; Mary Ann Brock Shoemaker

Henry Francis Shoemaker (March 28, 1843 – July 2, 1918) was an American railroad magnate and financier.

== Early life ==
Shoemaker was born in Orwigsburg, Pennsylvania, on March 28, 1843. He was the second son of Mary Ann (née Brock) Shoemaker (1821–1891) and John Wise Shoemaker (1811–1863), who invested in anthracite coal industry in Schuylkill County, Pennsylvania. His maternal grandfather was a coal operator of English and Scotch-Irish descent. The first Shoemaker was a Quaker who arrived in Germantown, Pennsylvania, from Holland in 1685, but was whose family came from the Palatinate region of Germany.

Shoemaker attended Genesee Seminary (which later became Syracuse University), from which he graduated in 1861. While Simon Cameron obtained an appointment to the U.S. Naval Academy for Shoemaker through President Abraham Lincoln, he declined so he could see immediate action, eventually fighting in the Battles of Shiloh, Wrightsville, and Gettysburg, achieving the rank of First Lt. in the United States Volunteers.

== Career ==
After his father's death in 1863, he took over management of his family's coal mines. During the 1870s, he expanded the family's interests into railroads and banking and moved to New York City in 1878.

Shoemaker eventually owned the Cincinnati, Hamilton and Drayton Railroad (which he expanded to over 2,000 miles long), had a controlling interest in the Cleveland, Lorain and Wheeling Railway, and held directorships in the Texas Pacific Railroad, the Chatham National Bank (which eventually merged into JPMorgan Chase), and the North American Trust Company.

== Personal life ==
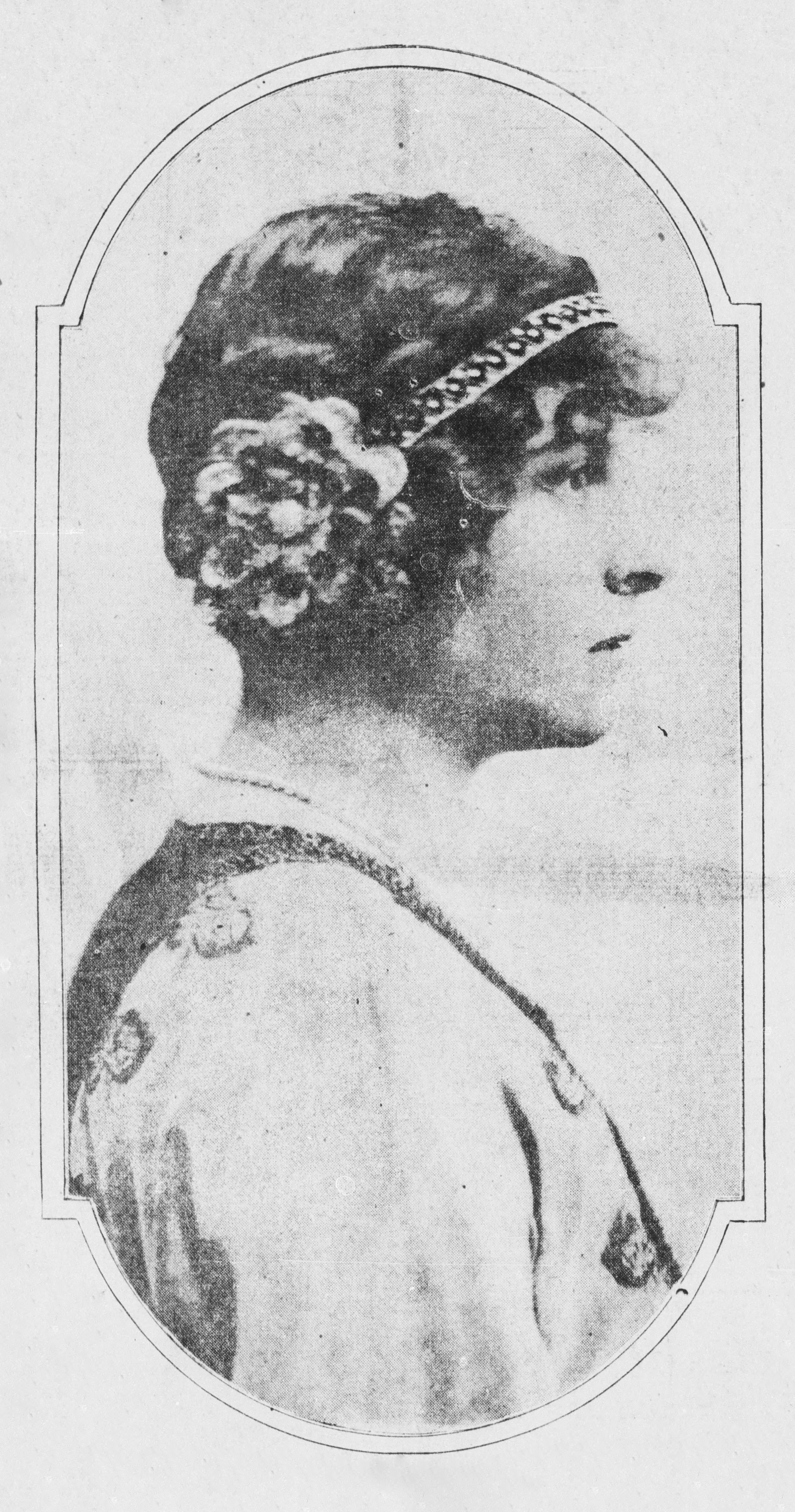
Profile photograph of his daughter, Blanche, 1912

In 1874 Shoemaker was married to Blanche Quiggle (1853–1928). Blanche, the sole daughter of railroad magnate and diplomat Col. James W. Quiggle of Philadelphia, was a descendent of Richard Buffington, an agent for William Penn who came to Pennsylvania from England in 1675. After moving to New York City, they lived in a five-story residence at 21 West 53rd Street, called Villa D'Este, adjoining the residence of John D. Rockefeller. They spent their summers at "Restless Oaks", the Quiggle family estate in McElhattan, Pennsylvania (near Lock Haven) and at "Cedar Cliff", an "opulent Victorian residence" in Riverside, Connecticut. Together, they were the parents of:

- Henry Wharton Shoemaker (1880–1958), who married Beatrice Genevieve Barclay (1888–1974) in 1907. They divorced and he remarried to Mabelle Ruth Ord (1878–1967) in 1913.
- William Brock Shoemaker (1882–1906), who married Ella Morris De Peyster (1881–1957), a daughter of Frederic James De Peyster, in 1905.
- Blanche LeRoy Shoemaker (1886–1967), who married Alfred Wagstaff (1881–1930), a son of Alfred Wagstaff Jr., in 1907. They divorced and she married Donald Carr (1887–1961) in 1921.

Shoemaker died on July 2, 1918, at his country estate in Riverside, Connecticut. His widow died in May 1928 at her residence, 610 Park Avenue, in New York City "after a fortnight's illness".

=== Descendants ===
Through his son Henry, he was a grandfather of Henry Francis Shoemaker II (1908–1974). Through his daughter Blanche, he was a grandfather of Alfred Wagstaff IV (1908–1982).
