= Blanche Shoemaker Wagstaff =

American writer

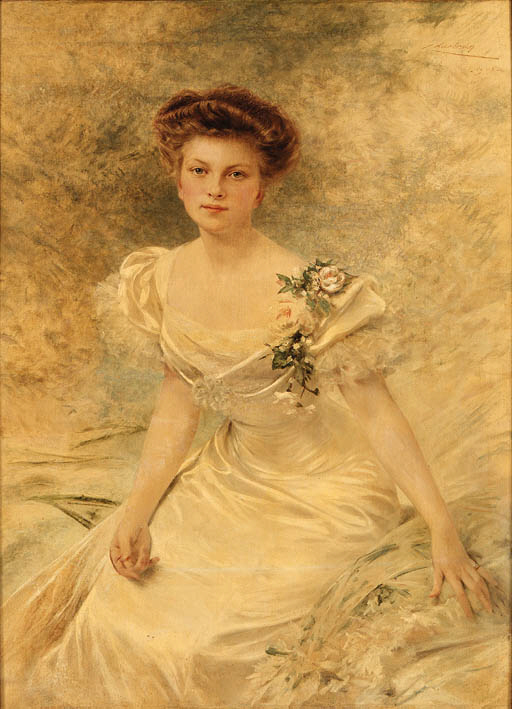
- Blanche Wagstaff, painted by Théobald Chartran.
- Born: Blanche LeRoy Shoemaker; July 10, 1888; Larchmont, New York, U.S.
- Died: December 15, 1967 (aged 79); Virginia Water, Surrey, England
- Spouses: Alfred Wagstaff III (m. 1907; div. 1920) Donald Carr (m. 1921; died 1961)
- Children: Alfred Wagstaff IV
- Parent(s): Henry Francis Shoemaker; Blanche Quiggle Shoemaker
- Relatives: Henry W. Shoemaker (brother)

Blanche Shoemaker Wagstaff (née Shoemaker, later Carr) (July 10, 1888 – December 15, 1967) was an American poet.

== Early life ==
Blanche was born in Larchmont, New York, on July 10, 1888, but spent much of her life in New York City. She was the only daughter of Henry Francis Shoemaker (1843–1918), a railroad magnate and close confidante of future vice president Charles W. Fairbanks, and Blanche (née Quiggle) Shoemaker (1853–1928). Among her siblings were Henry Wharton Shoemaker and William Brock Shoemaker, who married Ella Morris De Peyster (a daughter of Frederic James De Peyster) in 1905, but died in an elevator accident a few months after his wedding in 1906. Her mother was the sole daughter of railroad magnate and diplomat Col. James W. Quiggle of Philadelphia and Lock Haven, Pennsylvania.

She began writing at age 7, and had sold her first poem, to Town & Country, by age 16. In 1905, her portrait was painted by the French artist Théobald Chartran. After she made her debut in New York City, she was presented at the Court of St. James and later had a private interview with Pope Pius.

== Career ==
Blanche served for a time as the associate editor of The International, a magazine founded by her close friend George Sylvester Viereck, whose sensual, decadent verse mirrored Wagstaff's. She praised his work, although the two had a falling out over Viereck's support of Germany in the first World War, later reconciling in 1924. Her verse often dealt with sensual and classical themes, and twelve of her poems were anthologized in T. R. Smith's 1921 erotic verse collection Poetica Erotica. Her 1944 book for children, The Beloved Son, was a life of Jesus in verse.

H. L. Mencken praised Wagstaff's poetic drama Alcestis for its "constant novelty and ingenuity of epithet", though he thought she at times let "her adjectives run riot".

== Personal life ==
In 1907, she married Alfred Wagstaff III (1881–1930), the eldest son of Alfred Wagstaff Jr. Before their divorce in 1920, they were the parents of:

- Alfred Wagstaff IV (1908–1982), who married Julia A. C. Frederick, a daughter of William P. Frederick and descendant of Chief Justice John Marshall, in 1949.

After their divorce, she married well known real estate broker and amateur golf player Donald Carr on July 30, 1921, at Bide-a-Wee, her country place in Manchester, Vermont. During the ceremony, the officiating clergyman read one of her new poems entitled Marriage. Carr, who owned Cedarcliff in Riverside, Connecticut, was the son of Henry Shaler Carr and Tamzin (née Shaler) Carr (a daughter of Civil War Gen. Alexander Shaler).

In 1934, she sold two business buildings, 24 and 26 East 54th Street, adjoining the southwest corner of Madison Avenue, in midtown Manhattan for $400,000. The five-story building at 24 East 54th Street was a wedding gift from her father upon her marriage to Wagstaff. She had acquired the adjoining five-story building at 26 East 54th Street in 1921 and had them renovated for commercial use and leased to single tenants.

Carr died in 1961. Blanche died on December 15, 1967, in Virginia Water in the Borough of Runnymede in Surrey, England. She was interred at the Shoemaker Mausoleum in Woodlawn Cemetery in the Bronx.

== Published works ==
- The Song of Youth (1905)
- Woven of Dreams (1908)
- Atys, a Grecian Idyl, and Other Poems (1909)
- Alcestis: A Poetic Drama (1911)
- Colonial Plays for the School-room (1912)
- Eris: A Dramatic Allegory (1914)
- The Book of Love (1917)
- Narcissus and Other Poems (1918)
- Quiet Waters (1921)
- Bob, the Spaniel: The True Story of a Springer (1927)
- Mortality and Other Poems (1930)
- The Beloved Son (1944)
- After the Flesh (1953)
- Sonnets to Parsifal (1960)
