= McElhattan, Pennsylvania =

Unincorporated community in Pennsylvania, US

- Census-designated place
- Location in Clinton County and the state of Pennsylvania.
- Coordinates: 41°09′35″N 77°21′41″W
- Country: United States
- State: Pennsylvania
- County: Clinton
- Township: Wayne

Area
  - Total: 3.48 sq mi (9.02 km^{2})
  - Land: 3.35 sq mi (8.67 km^{2})
  - Water: 0.14 sq mi (0.35 km^{2})
- Elevation: 577 ft (176 m)

Population (2020)
  - Total: 1,224
  - Density: 365.8/sq mi (141.24/km^{2})
- Time zone: UTC-5 (Eastern (EST))
  - Summer (DST): UTC-4 (EDT)
- ZIP code: 17748
- FIPS code: 42-46112
- GNIS feature ID: 1180705

McElhattan is a census-designated place (CDP) in Wayne Township in southern Clinton County, Pennsylvania, United States. As of the 2010 census, the population was 598.

The community is located in eastern Clinton County and is bordered to the northwest by the West Branch of the Susquehanna River and to the southeast by U.S. Route 220, a four-lane freeway. The southwestern part of the CDP includes the area known as Youngdale. US 220 leads west 6 miles (10 km) to the city of Lock Haven, the Clinton County seat, and northeast 7 miles (11 km) to the borough of Jersey Shore. Bridge Road crosses the West Branch, connecting McElhattan with Dunnstable Township to the northwest.

== Demographics ==
Historical population
Census	Pop.	Note	%±
2020	1,224		—
U.S. Decennial Census
