= Avis, Pennsylvania =

Borough in Pennsylvania, US

- Borough
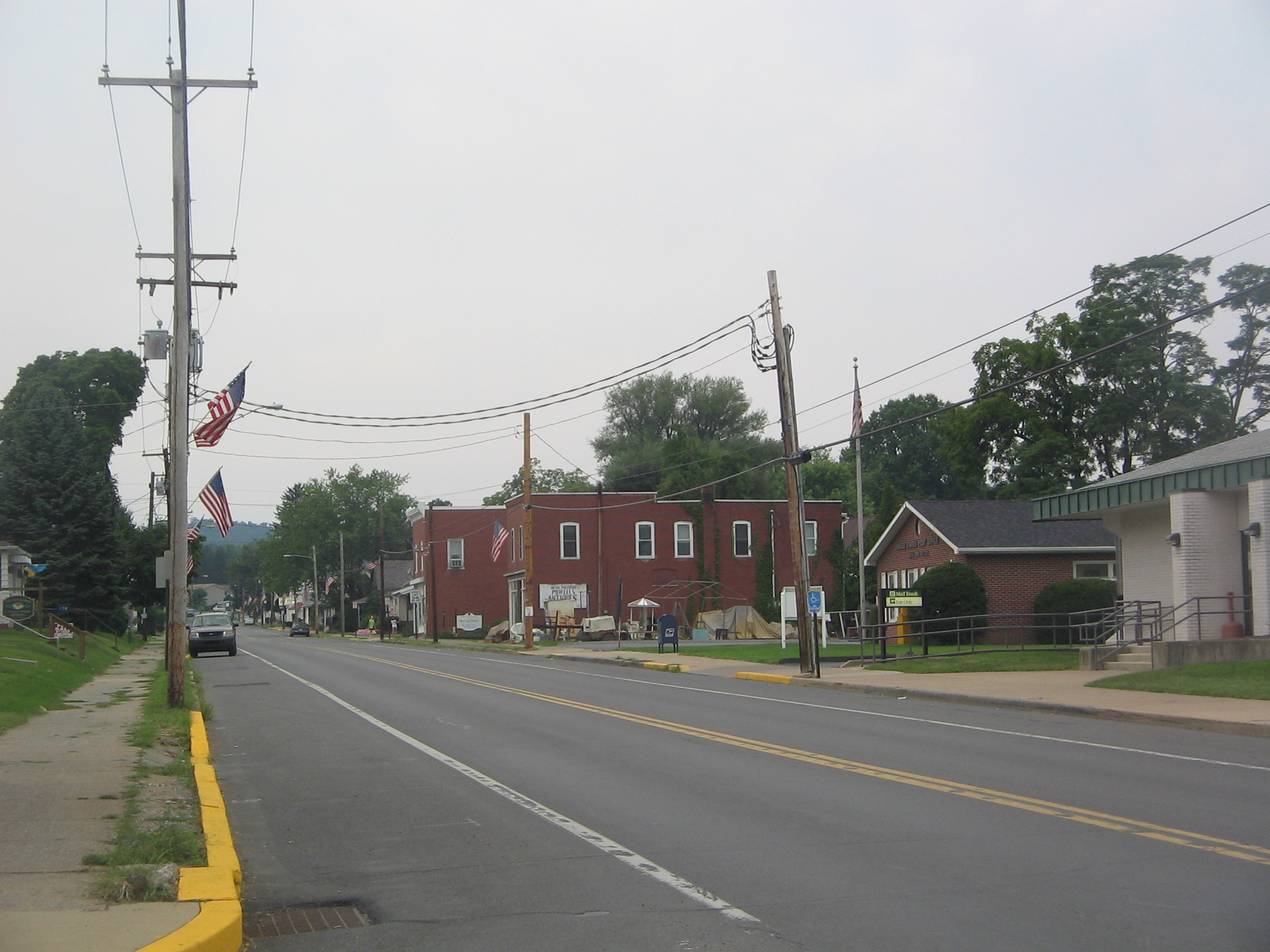
- Central Avenue in Avis

- Logo

- Location in Clinton County and the U.S. state of Pennsylvania.
- Coordinates: 41°11′07″N 77°18′59″W
- Country: United States
- State: Pennsylvania
- County: Clinton
- Settled: 1901
- Incorporated (borough): 1908

Government
  - Type: Borough Council
  - Mayor: Ernest Harter III (D)

Area
  - Total: 0.49 sq mi (1.28 km^{2})
  - Land: 0.49 sq mi (1.28 km^{2})
  - Water: 0 sq mi (0.00 km^{2})
- Elevation: 595 ft (181 m)

Population (2020)
  - Total: 1,473
  - Density: 2,977.0/sq mi (1,149.43/km^{2})
- Time zone: Eastern (EST)
  - Summer (DST): EDT
- ZIP code: 17721
- Area code: 570
- FIPS code: 42-03632
- Website: avisboro.org

Avis is a borough in Clinton County, Pennsylvania, United States. As of the 2020 census, Avis had a population of 1,473.

== Geography ==
Avis is located in southeastern Clinton County at 41°11′7″N 77°18′59″W (41.185234, -77.316455). It is on the north side of the valley of the West Branch Susquehanna River, which passes 1 mile (1.6 km) to the south.

U.S. Route 220, a four-lane freeway, runs along the southern edge of the borough, with access from Exit 118 (Pennsylvania Route 150) to the south of town and from Exit 120 (Pennsylvania Route 44) to the east. The borough of Jersey Shore is 3 miles (5 km) to the east of Avis, and Williamsport is 18 miles (29 km) to the east via US 220, while Lock Haven, the Clinton county seat, is 8 miles (13 km) to the west.

According to the United States Census Bureau, Avis has a total area of 0.5 square miles (1.3 km^{2}), all land.

== Demographics ==
Historical population
Census	Pop.	Note	%±
1910	796		—
1920	1,092		37.2%
1930	1,268		16.1%
1940	1,161		−8.4%
1950	1,193		2.8%
1960	1,262		5.8%
1970	1,749		38.6%
1980	1,718		−1.8%
1990	1,506		−12.3%
2000	1,492		−0.9%
2010	1,484		−0.5%
2020	1,473		−0.7%

As of the census of 2000, there were 1,492 people, 633 households, and 417 families residing in the borough. The population density was 3,040.4 inhabitants per square mile (1,173.9/km^{2}). There were 652 housing units at an average density of 1,328.7 per square mile (513.0/km^{2}). The racial makeup of the borough was 98.73% White, 0.34% African American, 0.60% Asian, and 0.34% from two or more races. Hispanic or Latino of any race were 0.07% of the population.

There were 633 households, out of which 29.9% had children under the age of 18 living with them, 54.0% were married couples living together, 8.1% had a female householder with no husband present, and 34.0% were non-families. 29.7% of all households were made up of individuals, and 17.4% had someone living alone who was 65 years of age or older. The average household size was 2.35 and the average family size was 2.91.

In the borough the population was spread out, with 23.3% under the age of 18, 8.0% from 18 to 24, 27.3% from 25 to 44, 22.3% from 45 to 64, and 19.2% who were 65 years of age or older. The median age was 40 years. For every 100 females, there were 95.3 males. For every 100 females age 18 and over, there were 91.9 males.

The median income for a household in the borough was $31,083, and the median income for a family was $39,167. Males had a median income of $30,250 versus $18,942 for females. The per capita income for the borough was $16,371. About 6.5% of families and 9.8% of the population were below the poverty line, including 7.6% of those under age 18 and 14.0% of those age 65 or over.
