= Jersey Shore, Pennsylvania =

Borough in Pennsylvania, US

Jersey Shore, Pennsylvania Waynesburg
- Borough
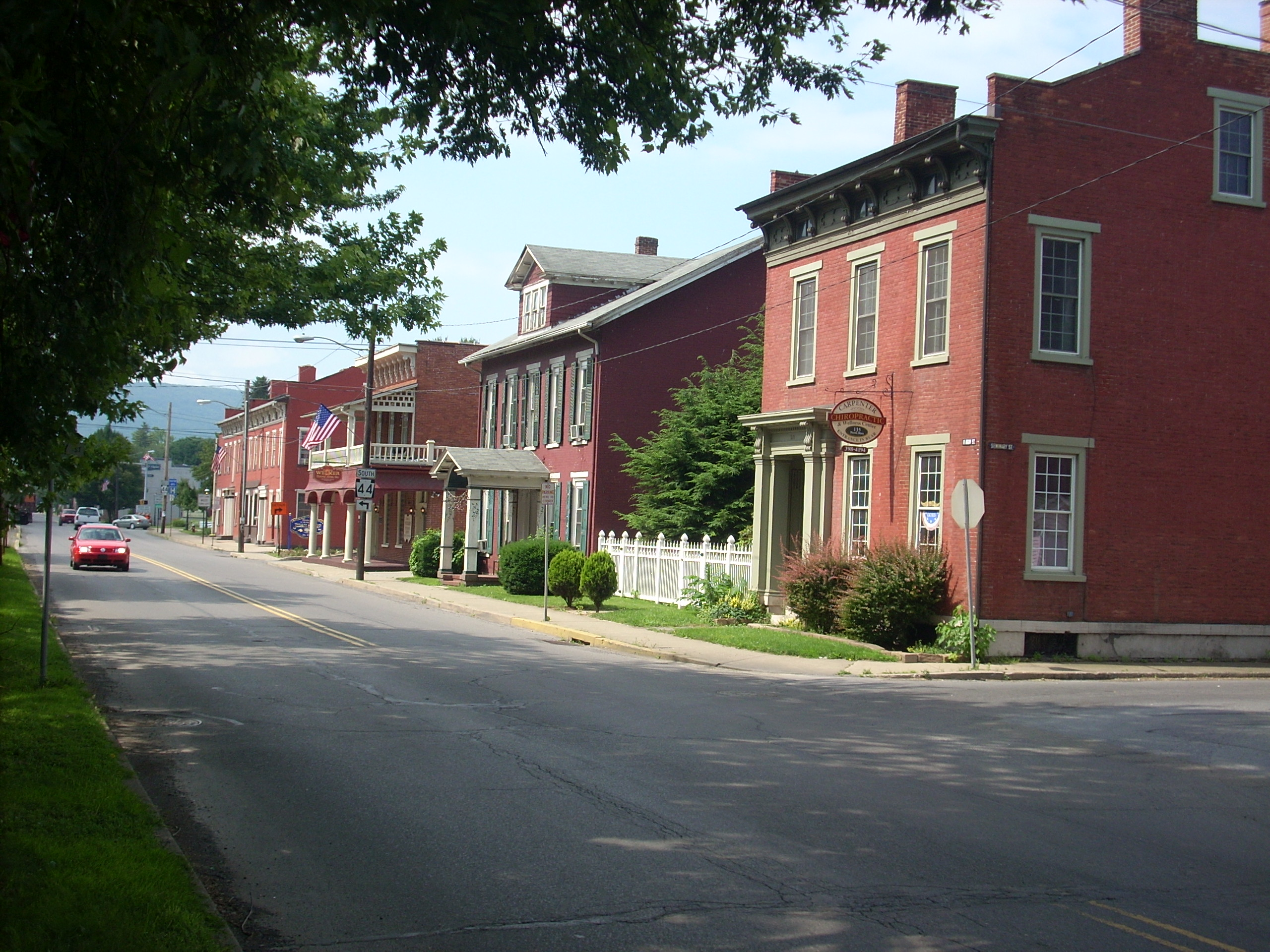
- A view of Jersey Shore

- Location of Jersey Shore in Lycoming County, Pennsylvania.

- Map of Pennsylvania highlighting Lycoming County
- Coordinates: 41°12′9″N 77°16′0″W
- Country: United States
- State: Pennsylvania
- County: Lycoming
- Settled: 1800
- Incorporated: 1826

Government
  - Type: Borough Council
  - Mayor: Lon Myers

Area
  - Total: 1.18 sq mi (3.06 km^{2})
  - Land: 1.16 sq mi (3.00 km^{2})
  - Water: 0.023 sq mi (0.06 km^{2})
- Elevation: 604 ft (184 m)

Population (2020)
  - Total: 4,166
  - Density: 3,598/sq mi (1,389.3/km^{2})
- Time zone: UTC-5 (Eastern (EST))
  - Summer (DST): UTC-4 (EDT)
- ZIP codes: 17740
- Area codes: 570 and 272
- FIPS code: 42-38128
- GNIS feature ID: 1213696
- Website: www.jerseyshoreboro.org

Jersey Shore is a borough in Lycoming County, Pennsylvania, United States. It is on the West Branch Susquehanna River, 15 miles (24 km) west by south of Williamsport. It is part of the Williamsport, Pennsylvania Metropolitan Statistical Area. In the past, Jersey Shore held farms, railroad shops, cigar factories, a foundry, and a large silk mill. The population was 4,158 at the 2020 census.

== History ==
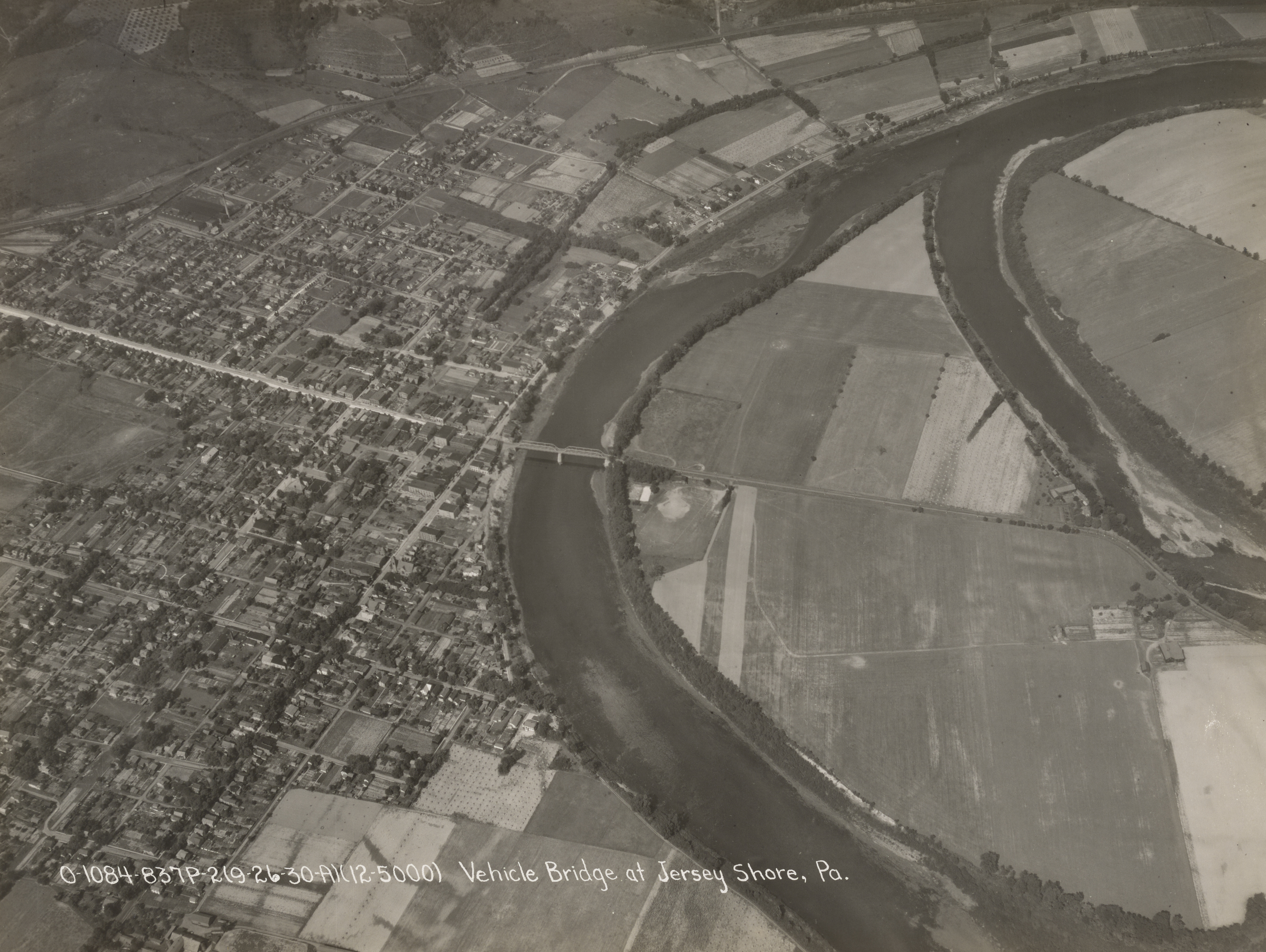
Jersey Shore in 1930

Jersey Shore was incorporated as a borough on March 15, 1826. The history of Jersey Shore begins about 50 years before it was incorporated and on the opposite bank of the West Branch Susquehanna River in what is now Nippenose Township. Colonel John Henry Antes arrived in 1772 and established a homestead along the banks of Antes Creek. Antes also built a gristmill and his fortified home, Fort Antes, provided a safe haven for the early settlers against raids conducted by Loyalist and Indian forces during the American Revolution. Settlers who had sought refuge at Fort Antes and had returned to the right bank of the West Branch to milk their cows were among the first killed when Fort Antes was attacked just prior to the Big Runaway. These pioneers on the north side of the river were counted among the Fair Play Men, a group of squatters who lived outside the jurisdiction of the colonial and revolutionary governments of Pennsylvania. Many of the settlers did not return to the area until after Sullivan's Expedition had forced the Lenape and other Indians allied with the British further west.

Jersey Shore was originally named Waynesburg by the two brothers, Reuben and Jeremiah Manning, who laid out the town circa 1785. Around the time that this was happening, a settlement arose on the eastern side of the West Branch Susquehanna River (Nippenose Township), opposite Waynesburg. A rivalry developed between the two settlements, and those on the eastern shore began referring to the settlement on the western shore as the "Jersey Shore," because the Manning family had relocated from New Jersey. The nickname became so fixed that in 1826 the original name of Waynesburg was officially abandoned and changed to Jersey Shore.

Jersey Shore's location on the West Branch Susquehanna River, just downstream from the mouth of Pine Creek made it an ideal location for traders and other businessmen who outfitted the pioneers who settled the westernmost portions of the West Branch Susquehanna River Valley and the Pine Creek valley. Thomas Martin was a farmer who sold his produce to the people of Jersey Shore and to the men and women who were just passing through. Mr. Martin was noted for his strong beliefs regarding the prices that he set. For example, if he believed that his potatoes were worth 35 cents a bushel, he would sell them for 35 cents a bushel, no more no less. If his competitors would sell potatoes for 50 cents a bushel, Martin would not raise his price and if others lowered the price to 25 cents per bushel, he would not lower his price. This firmness and fairness allowed Thomas Martin to rise to a position of prominence in Jersey Shore and Lycoming County. His reputation for fairness and honesty was passed onto his son Lewis Martin who went on to serve as a Lycoming County prothonotary and as a deputy U.S. Marshal.

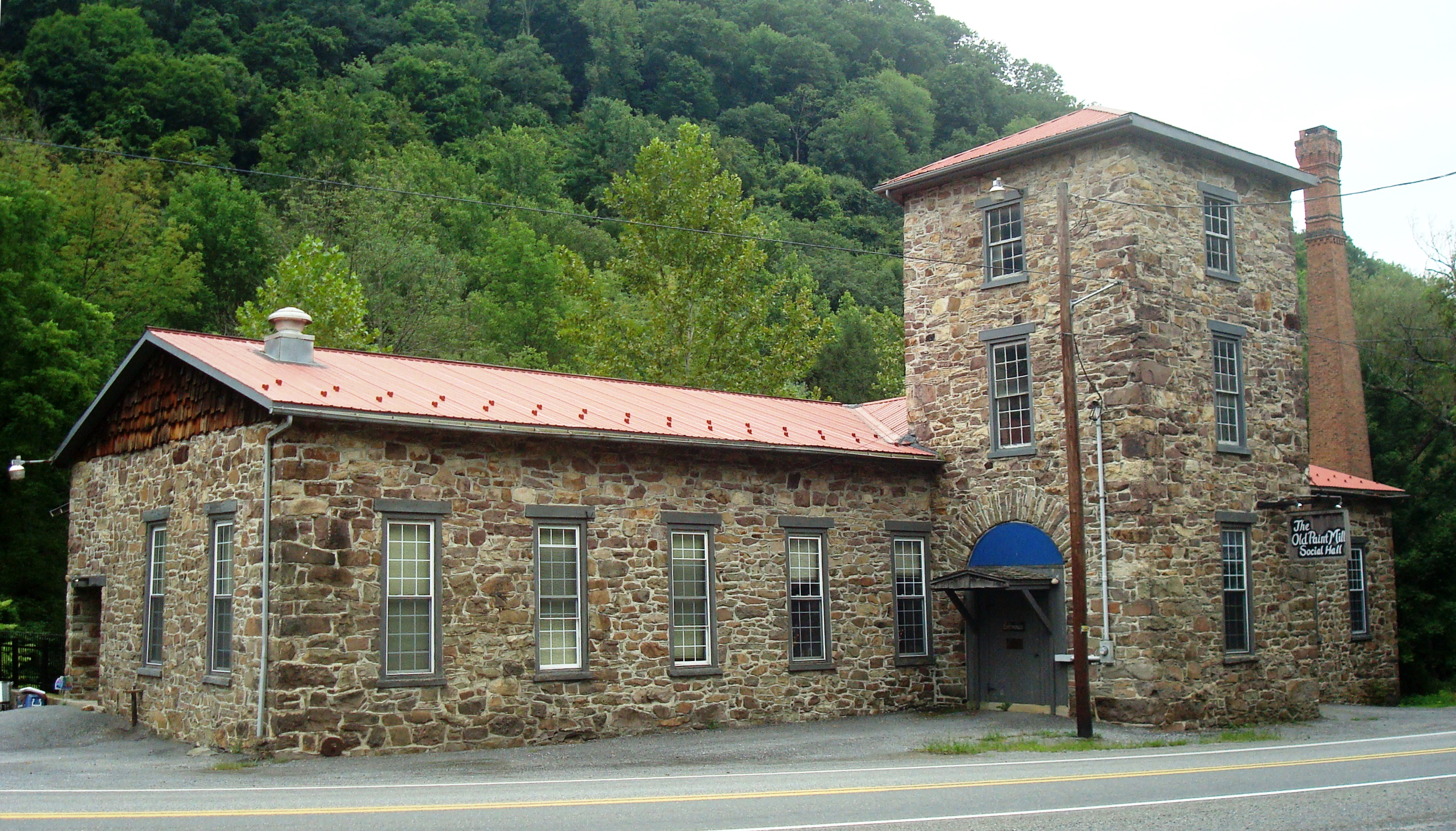
The Old Paint Mill

The Reverend John Hays Grier arrived in Jersey Shore in 1814. He was a Presbyterian missionary who originally set out from his home of Doylestown Pennsylvania with the intention of serving the pioneers of the west. He stopped one Sunday in Jersey Shore and for the most part never left. He built a strong congregation at Jersey Shore and another upstream on the West Branch in Lock Haven. Grier served the churches in Lock Haven and Jersey Shore for 14 years before serving the church in Jersey Shore, alone, for an additional 23 years. Rev. Grier was also elected sheriff of Lycoming County in 1822.

Jersey Shore was once a major player in the railroad industry. In 1901, the New York Central and Hudson River Railroad announced it would build large rail car shops near Avis, 4 miles (6.4 km) west of Jersey Shore, on the far side of Pine Creek. To induce workers and businesses to favor Jersey Shore over competing towns, entrepreneurs acquired land and built the Jersey Shore Electric Street Railway, a trolley line running from the city to the New York Central shops. In 1905, a second trolley line, the Jersey Shore and Antes Fort Railway, was put into service between the city and the Pennsylvania Railroad station in Antes Fort, 2 miles (3.2 km) to the southeast. These two trolley lines changed Jersey Shore from a city with no railroad connection to a city with two. What had formerly been a minor stop on the West Branch Canal and stagecoach lines was transformed into an industrial boomtown. Over 1,000 skilled mechanics were employed at the car shops. They were able to earn wages that far exceeded the normal income of the average worker in Lycoming County at the time. Other early industrial ventures in Jersey Shore included the American Balance Valve and Machine Works (a maker of railroad valves), the Susquehanna Silk Mill and the Jersey Shore Creamery Company.

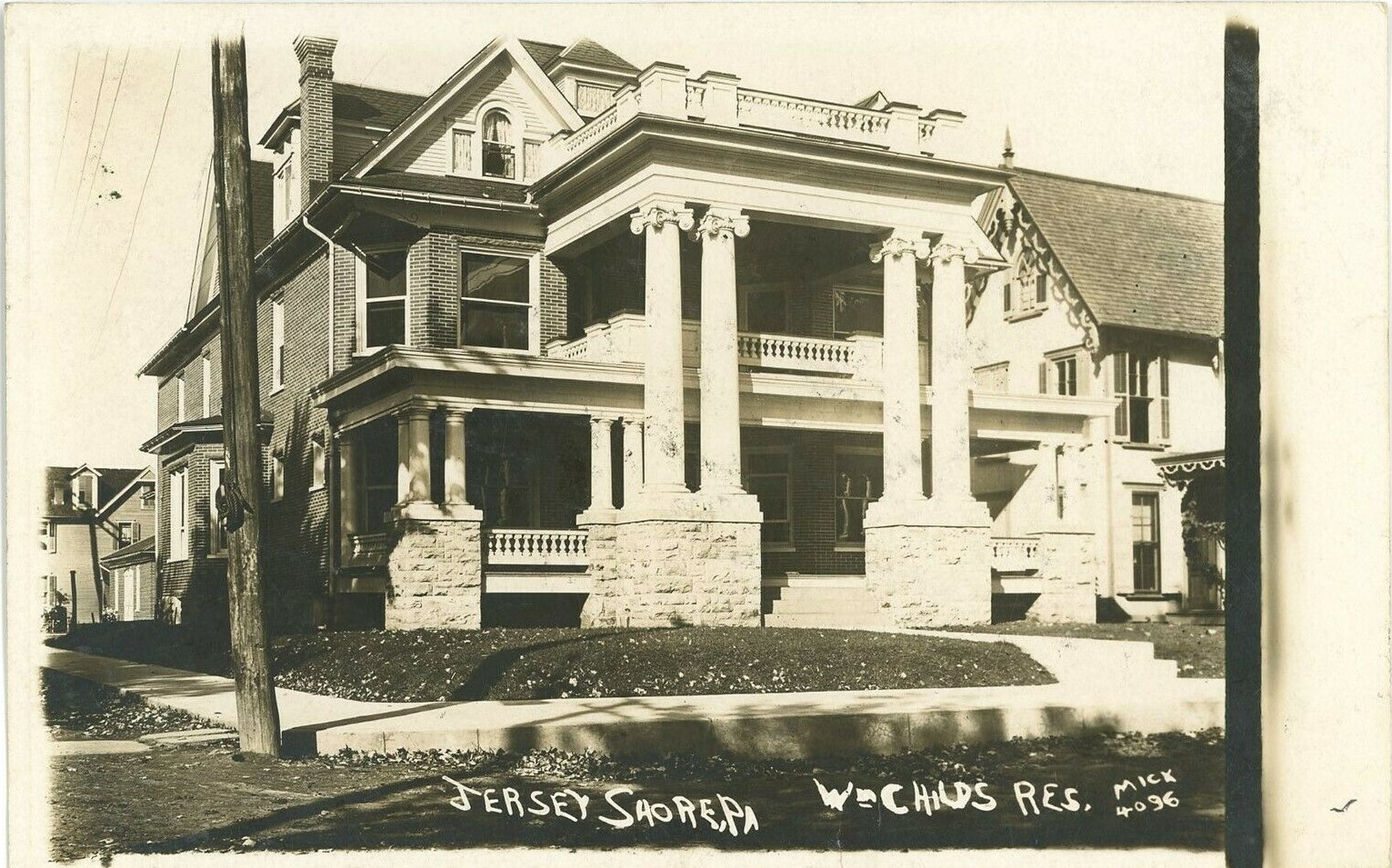
203 N. Main Street, Jersey Shore, PA - Jan. 2, 1908

On October 10, 1911, Jersey Shore Hospital was founded by four physicians. At that time, the hospital consisted of 14 beds in the rebuilt home of the L.D. Herrit family. Over the next few years, x-ray services, a maternity ward, and nurses’ residence were added. It was not until 1922 that Jersey Shore Hospital was recognized as a community hospital by the borough and became a not-for-profit institution, which the hospital still maintains.

Jersey Shore Steel Company was founded in 1938, near the end of the Great Depression by John A. Schultz. The company began manufacturing steel rails for the railroad industry. In its first year of business Jersey Shore Steel was able to produce 15,000 tons of rail steel. When John A. Schultz died in 1943, the business was passed onto his sons Charles and John A. Jr. The brothers oversaw expansion and devastation. A massive fire nearly destroyed the steel mill in 1963, and the Agnes Flood of 1972 caused tremendous damage. The company, which is owned by a third generation of the Schultz family, operates two mills, the original mill in Jersey Shore and a second mill downstream in Montoursville. It is capable of producing 170,000 tons of rail steel annually.

The Jersey Shore Historic District was added to the National Register of Historic Places in 1975.

== Industry ==
In the past, Jersey Shore held farms, railroad shops, cigar factories, a foundry, and a large silk mill.

Woolrich, Inc. had a mill in Jersey Shore, in addition to ones in the neighbouring towns of Woolrich and Avis, which closed in 2008.

== Geography ==
Jersey Shore is located at 41°12′9″N 77°16′0″W (41.202587, -77.266715). It is just east of the confluence of Pine Creek with the Susquehanna, surrounded to the north, west, and south by Porter Township and to the east (across the Susquehanna) by Nippenose Township. As the crow flies, Lycoming County is approximately 130 miles (209 km) northwest of Philadelphia and 165 miles (266 km) east-northeast of Pittsburgh.

According to the United States Census Bureau, the borough has a total area of 1.2 square miles (3.1 km^{2}), all land.

== Demographics ==
Historical population
Census	Pop.	Note	%±
1840	525		—
1850	640		21.9%
1860	1,365		113.3%
1870	1,394		2.1%
1880	1,411		1.2%
1890	1,853		31.3%
1900	3,070		65.7%
1910	5,381		75.3%
1920	6,103		13.4%
1930	5,781		−5.3%
1940	5,432		−6.0%
1950	5,595		3.0%
1960	5,613		0.3%
1970	5,322		−5.2%
1980	4,631		−13.0%
1990	4,353		−6.0%
2000	4,482		3.0%
2010	4,361		−2.7%
2020	4,166		−4.5%
2021 (est.)	4,132	▼	−0.8%

=== 2020 census ===
As of the 2020 census, Jersey Shore had a population of 4,166. The median age was 36.9 years. 23.9% of residents were under the age of 18 and 17.1% of residents were 65 years of age or older. For every 100 females there were 96.9 males, and for every 100 females age 18 and over there were 95.8 males age 18 and over.

100.0% of residents lived in urban areas, while 0.0% lived in rural areas.

There were 1,653 households in Jersey Shore, of which 33.2% had children under the age of 18 living in them. Of all households, 42.3% were married-couple households, 19.5% were households with a male householder and no spouse or partner present, and 26.3% were households with a female householder and no spouse or partner present. About 28.9% of all households were made up of individuals and 13.1% had someone living alone who was 65 years of age or older.

There were 1,842 housing units, of which 10.3% were vacant. The homeowner vacancy rate was 3.1% and the rental vacancy rate was 10.3%.

Racial composition as of the 2020 census
Race	Number	Percent
White	3,949	94.8%
Black or African American	39	0.9%
American Indian and Alaska Native	0	0.0%
Asian	32	0.8%
Native Hawaiian and Other Pacific Islander	2	0.0%
Some other race	6	0.1%
Two or more races	138	3.3%
Hispanic or Latino (of any race)	28	0.7%

=== 2000 census ===
As of the census of 2000, there were 4,482 people, 1,771 households, and 1,190 families residing in the borough. The population density was 3,655.1 inhabitants per square mile (1,411.2/km^{2}). There were 1,904 housing units at an average density of 1,552.7 per square mile (599.5/km^{2}). The racial makeup of the borough was 98.75% White, 0.38% African American, 0.13% Native American, 0.29% Asian, 0.07% Pacific Islander, 0.11% from other races, and 0.27% from two or more races. Hispanic or Latino of any race were 0.13% of the population.

There were 1,771 households, out of which 34.6% had children under the age of 18 living with them, 49.5% were married couples living together, 13.0% had a female householder with no husband present, and 32.8% were non-families. 28.1% of all households were made up of individuals, and 12.8% had someone living alone who was 65 years of age or older. The average household size was 2.45 and the average family size was 2.98.

In the borough the population was spread out, with 26.0% under the age of 18, 8.9% from 18 to 24, 29.4% from 25 to 44, 18.7% from 45 to 64, and 17.1% who were 65 years of age or older. The median age was 36 years. For every 100 females, there were 84.7 males. For every 100 females age 18 and over, there were 82.4 males.

The median income for a household in the borough was $30,594, and the median income for a family was $39,261. Males had a median income of $27,045 versus $18,220 for females. The per capita income for the borough was $15,343. About 6.5% of families and 9.0% of the population were below the poverty line, including 12.7% of those under age 18 and 6.3% of those age 65 or over.

== Attractions ==
Jersey Shore is the southern terminus of the 65-mile (105 km) long Pine Creek Rail Trail.

== Media ==
- WEJS
- WJSA-FM
- WXPI

== Notable people ==
- Robbie Gould (born 1982), professional football player
- June Maule (1917–2009), owner of Maule Air
- Hunter S. Thompson (1937–2005), author, journalist
- Gabrielle Chappel, winner Next Level Chef television show Season 3
- Vinny Mauro, drummer for American Metalcore band Motionless in White (2014–present)

== See also ==
- History of Lycoming County, Pennsylvania
- Jersey Shore Steel
