= Dunnstable Township, Pennsylvania =

Township in Pennsylvania, US

Coordinates: 41°10′06″N 77°22′23″W

- Township
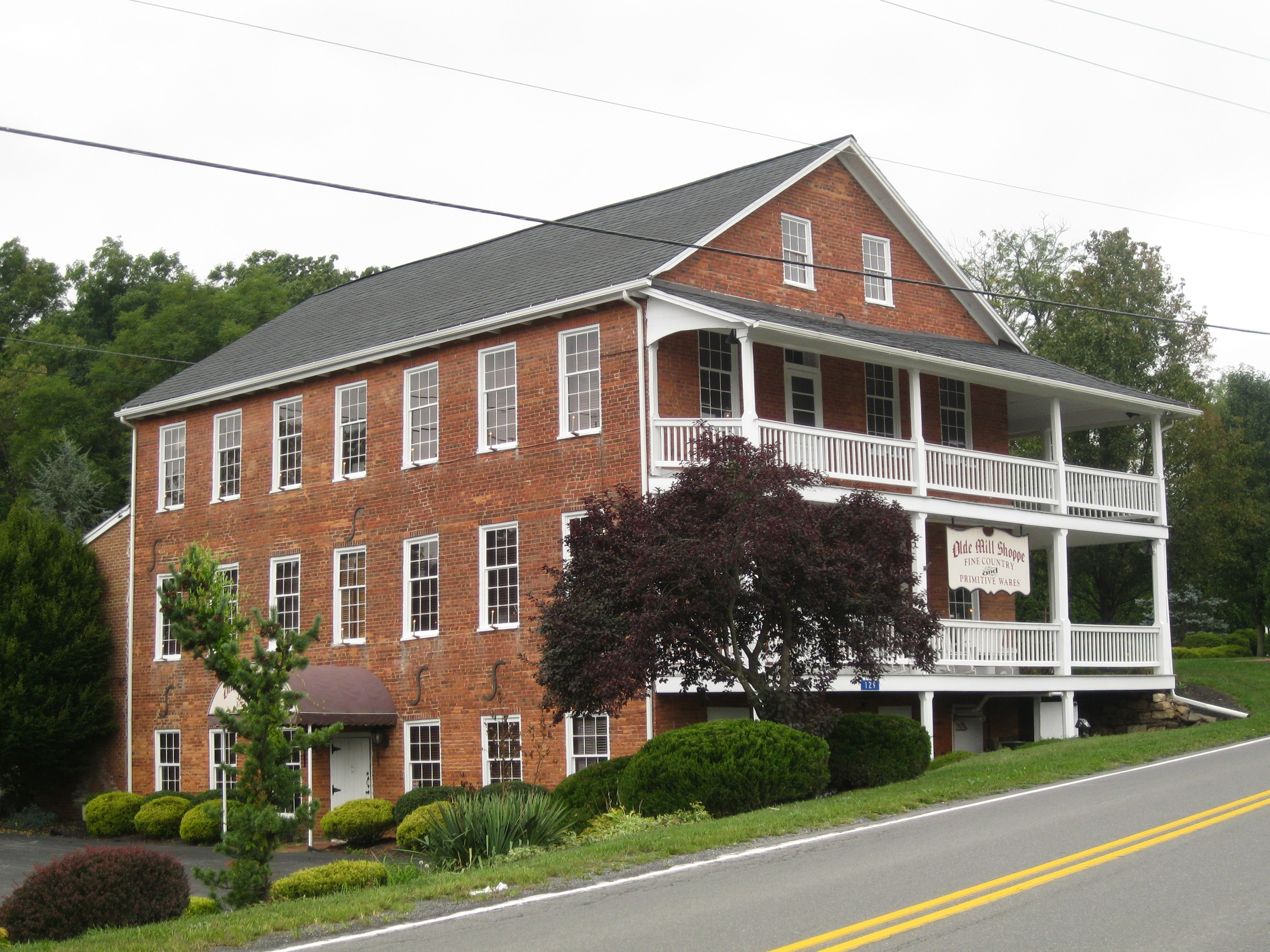
- Rich-McCormick Woolen Factory, a historic site in the township

- Location in Clinton County and the state of Pennsylvania.
- Country: United States
- State: Pennsylvania
- County: Clinton
- Settled: 1785
- Incorporated: Before 1839

Area
  - Total: 9.61 sq mi (24.89 km^{2})
  - Land: 9.37 sq mi (24.28 km^{2})
  - Water: 0.24 sq mi (0.61 km^{2})

Population (2020)
  - Total: 1,002 ▼
  - Estimate (2021): 1,010
  - Density: 108/sq mi (41.8/km^{2})
- FIPS code: 42-035-20408

Dunnstable Township is a township in Clinton County, Pennsylvania, United States. The population was 1,002 at the 2020 census.

== History ==
The Rich-McCormick Woolen Factory was listed on the National Register of Historic Places in 1985.

== Geography ==
According to the United States Census Bureau, the township has a total area of 9.6 square miles (24.9 km^{2}), of which 9.4 square miles (24.3 km^{2}) is land and 0.23 square miles (0.6 km^{2}), or 2.45%, is water.

== Demographics ==
Historical population
Census	Pop.	Note	%±
1980	982		—
1990	846		−13.8%
2000	945		11.7%
2010	1,008		6.7%
2020	1,002		−0.6%
2021 (est.)	1,010		0.8%

As of the census of 2000, there were 945 people, 366 households, and 285 families residing in the township. The population density was 101.3 inhabitants per square mile (39.1/km^{2}). There were 381 housing units at an average density of 40.8 per square mile (15.8/km^{2}). The racial makeup of the township was 98.5% White, 0.3% African American, 0.6% Asian, 0.1% from other races, and 0.4% from two or more races. Hispanic or Latino of any race were 0.4% of the population.

There were 366 households, out of which 27.3% had children under the age of 18 living with them, 68.6% were married couples living together, 6.0% had a female householder with no husband present, and 21.9% were non-families. 17.8% of all households were made up of individuals, and 9.3% had someone living alone who was 65 years of age or older. The average household size was 2.57 and the average family size was 2.88.

In the township the population was spread out, with 21.7% under the age of 18, 5.3% from 18 to 24, 27.4% from 25 to 44, 28.8% from 45 to 64, and 16.8% who were 65 years of age or older. The median age was 43 years. For every 100 females there were 99.4 males. For every 100 females age 18 and over, there were 98.9 males.

The median income for a household in the township was $47,981, and the median income for a family was $51,250. Males had a median income of $32,333 versus $20,469 for females. The per capita income for the township was $19,382. About 4.1% of families and 5.4% of the population were below the poverty line, including 4.5% of those under age 18 and 9.7% of those age 65 or over.
