= History of Williamsport, Pennsylvania =

Williamsport, Pennsylvania was incorporated as a borough on March 1, 1806, and as a city on January 15, 1866. The city is the original home of Little League Baseball, founded in 1939 as a three-team league.

In the late 19th century, when Williamsport was known as "The Lumber Capital of the World" because of its thriving lumber industry, it also was the birthplace of the national newspaper Grit in 1882. Williamsport once had more millionaires per-capita than anywhere in the world. The area's local high school, the Williamsport Area High School, uses The Millionaires as its mascot.

== Founders ==
The founders of Williamsport were Michael Ross and William Hepburn. Both men played a great role in the formation of Lycoming County and the establishment of Williamsport as the county seat.

Michael Ross, of Scottish descent, was born on July 12, 1759. He and his mother were living in Philadelphia, Pennsylvania in 1772 when Michael became indentured servants to Samuel Wallis, known as the "Land King" of the West Branch Susquehanna River Valley. Wallis had extensive holdings in Muncy Township. Wallis brought Michael Ross and his mother to Muncy Township where Ross was trained as a surveyor's assistant. Michael Ross must have made a good impression upon Wallis, since Wallis gave Ross 109 acres (0.4 km^{2}) of land and a favorable letter of recommendation. Ross quickly became a successful surveyor and farmer. He was able to use his profits to purchase 285 acres (1.2 km^{2}) of land along the West Branch Susquehanna River, between Loyalsock and Lycoming Creeks. This land originally called "Virginia" was to in time become Williamsport, the county seat of Lycoming County.

William Hepburn was in County Donegal, Ireland in 1753. He migrated to the Thirteen Colonies in 1773 or 1774. Hepburn lived in the Sunbury area for a short time before moving up the West Branch Susquehanna River to what is now Duboistown where he worked for Andrew Culbertson in digging the race for Culbertson's Mill. Hepburn also joined the local militia. During the American Revolution, the West Branch Valley came under attack from Loyalist and Indian forces. These attacks were known as the Big Runaway in 1778 and the later Little Runaway in 1779. Hepburn rose to the position of colonel and was the commanding officer at Fort Muncy, Samuel Wallis' fortified home in Muncy Township. Hepburn, reportedly, gave the orders to Robert Covenhoven and Rachel Silverthorn to spread the word of the impending attacks. Following the Big Runaway, Hepburn kept a permanent connection with the Covenhoven family by marrying, Crecy Covenhoven, the sister of Robert. Hepburn also bought 300 acres (1.2 km^{2}) of land, to the west of Ross' holdings. His land, known as "Deer Park", combined with Ross' "Virginia" would eventually become Williamsport.

== Selection of Williamsport as the county seat ==
The selection of Williamsport as county seat was a major controversy in the early history of Lycoming County. It involved a bitter rivalry between an old frontier town and an upstart town that was built on a swamp. The first commissioners and officers of Lycoming County had their first offices and held their first court in Jaysburg (now part of the Newberry section of Williamsport). Jaysburg was on the western side of Lycoming Creek on a high piece of land. The land to the east of Lycoming Creek was known as "Deer Park" and was quite swampy. Jaysburg was at the time the only sizeable village west of Muncy. Although Muncy was and still is in Lycoming County it was not considered as an option for county seathood, possibly due to its proximity to the southern and eastern borders of the county. Jaysburg's buildings were sufficient to serve as the first courthouse and jail in the history of Lycoming County. It seemed to be the most logical place for establishing a county seat and many of its residents were quite sure that their town would indeed be the county seat. This was not to be. The county seat was awarded to a new community across the creek and Jaysburg soon disappeared from the map and its land was absorbed by the new city of Williamsport.

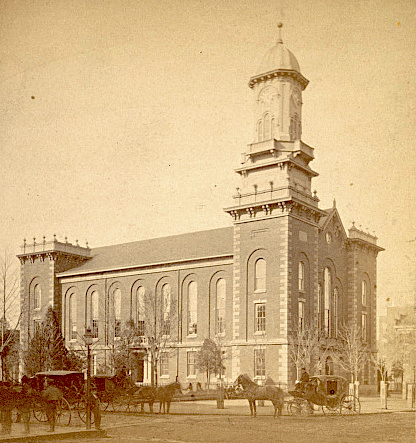
Old Lycoming County Courthouse in Williamsport, built 1860

One of the first county judges, William Hepburn, owned the land on the opposite shore of Jaysburg that was known as Deer Park. Another land speculator, Michael Ross owned 285 acres (1.2 km^{2}) of land in what is now the central part of Williamsport. Ross had laid out a town on his property and a few homes were being built. Ross and Hepburn would team together to create Williamsport from land that was swampy and thought to be uninhabitable by the Susquehannocks who had originally inhabited the West Branch Susquehanna River Valley. Ross wanted to sell his properties and rightly believed that they would quickly sell if his town was made county seat. Hepburn desired for political power, had little money by which to gain that power, but had a lot of land, land that could also be sold if Williamsport were to become the county seat.

The citizens of Jaysburg saw the attempts by Hepburn and Ross as a threat and they fought back. They believed that Jaysburg was much better suited to be the seat of government. It was already well established and held the higher and drier land. They firmly believed that Williamsport would be frequently flooded and that the swamps would carry deadly diseases. The Jaysburgers sought to prove their point by sending an affidavit to the state capital stating that the land was prone to flooding and thereby unsuitable to be the county seat. A resident of Northumberland wrote an affidavit that he had once "tied up" his boat on a point of land on what is now East Third and State Streets in downtown Williamsport. He accessed it by way of a "gut" or an arm of the river that backflowed into the land. The affidavit was the proof that the Jaysburg interests needed to discredit Williamsport as a possible location for the county seat. Hepburn and Ross heard of this potentially financially devastating document and sought to have it destroyed before it reached the state government. It is supposed that men working for Hepburn and Ross met up with the messenger bearing the affidavit at the Russell Inn on the corner of East Third and Mulberry Streets in Williamsport and got him intoxicated. Then they are said to have cut open his saddle bags and made off with the documents.

The state commissioners by this time had begun to grow very weary of the rivalry between Jaysburg and Williamsport. They began to consider a third possibility for the county seat, a new village that was further up the West Branch Susquehanna River west of the mouth of Pine Creek in what is now Clinton County. The town of Dunnsburg even went as far as offering, free of charge, lots on which to build the buildings that would be required by the county government. It appeared as if the state commissioners would choose neither Williamsport nor Jaysburg, instead choosing the outpost of Dunnsburg. This is when Judge Hepburn and Michael Ross set out their plan that ultimately led towards Williamsport being named the county seat.

Hepburn convinced Ross to offer lots of his property to the state commissioners for the building of a county courthouse and jail. This he believed would induce the state commissioners to give the seathood to Williamsport. Ross is stated to have had little interest in politics, but being a good businessman was interested in selling his land. Ross agreed to Hepburn's suggestion and the lots were offered to the state commission. The state commission accepted the lots and Williamsport was finally named the county seat of Lycoming County.

When Williamsport was established as the county seat it was little more than a few cabins spread here and there in the aforementioned swampy areas. Jaysburg served as the de facto county seat for several years after Williamsport was "officially" named the seat of government for Lycoming County. This delay became a cause for concern to the residents of county and the state government in Philadelphia. The county commissioners delayed in constructing a courthouse and jail in Williamsport until 1799. The jail was finally opened in 1801. Next the commissioners approved the construction of the county courthouse in Williamsport. Construction also began in 1800 and work was completed in late 1804, nearly ten years after Williamsport was named the county seat.

== City "firsts" ==
1778 - The first purpose-built cemetery is opened on what is now the site of Calvary United Methodist Church on Washington Blvd.

1786 - The first house was built in Williamsport. James Russell built his inn on what is now the corner of East Third and Mulberry Streets in downtown. It served as the first courthouse in Williamsport.

1796 - The first recorded childbirth in Williamsport was James Russell the son of Mr. and Mrs. William Russell and grandson of James Russell of the Russell Inn.

1796 - The first school is built as a one-room log addition to the building that would eventually become the first Lycoming County Courthouse. Caleb Bailey was the first teacher.

1799 - The first post office is built at the corner of Third and State Streets in what is now downtown. The post office was later converted to a saloon.

1875 - The first tower clock to sound the Cambridge Quarters is installed at Trinity Episcopal Church (Williamsport, Pennsylvania)

== Peter Herdic ==
Peter Herdic (1824–1888) was a lumber baron, entrepreneur, inventor, politician, and philanthropist in Victorian era Williamsport. He was the youngest of seven children born to Henry and Elizabeth Herdic on December 14, 1824, in Fort Plain, New York. Herdic's father died in 1826 and Elizabeth Herdic remarried shortly thereafter. She was widowed again prior to 1837 when she moved her family to Pipe Creek, New York near Ithaca. Herdic attended school for just a few years while he worked on his mother's 50-acre (200,000 m^{2}) farm. He left his mother's farm in 1846 and arrived in Lycoming County later that same year and settled in Cogan House Township. Herdic would go on to become one of the wealthiest men in Pennsylvania. He was a major figure on the development of the lumber industry throughout North Central Pennsylvania. Herdic donated large amounts of land and money to various churches, for example, Trinity Episcopal Church (Williamsport, Pennsylvania). Peter Herdic is the inventor of the Herdic cab, a precursor to the taxi. It was a two-wheeled horse-drawn carriage with side seats and a rear entrance. Peter Herdic died on February 2, 1888, as the result of a concussion sustained when he slipped and fell on ice while inspecting his waterworks in Huntingdon, Pennsylvania.

== Susquehanna Boom ==
The Susquehanna Boom was a system of cribs in the West Branch Susquehanna River designed to hold timber in the river until it could be processed at one of the nearly 60 sawmills along the West Branch Susquehanna River between Lycoming and Loyalsock Creeks in Lycoming County, Pennsylvania in the United States. The boom was constructed in 1846 under the supervision of James H. Perkins. A boom is "a barrier composed of a chain of floating logs enclosing other free-floating logs, typically used to catch floating debris or to obstruct passage". The Susquehanna Boom extended seven miles (11 km) upstream from Duboistown to the village of Linden in Woodward Township. The boom was constructed by creating a series of man-made islands known as "cribs". These cribs built of local mountain stone and sunken timber were stretched diagonally across the river, beginning on the south side near Duboistown and ending on the north side near Linden. The boom was made of 352 separate cribs that were 22 feet (7 m) high. The boom was opened and closed at the upper end by a device known as a "sheer boom." It was 1,000 feet (300 m) long and was controlled with a hand-powered windlass. The sheer boom gathered the logs into the main boom that was capable of holding up to 300 million board feet (710,000 m^{3}) of logs. The lower end of the boom was where the logs were sorted. The mills in Williamsport, South Williamsport, and Duboistown each had their own distinctive brand burnt into the logs. The men working at the end of the boom would sort the logs according to their corresponding brand and float them into the correct holding pond along the bank of the river. During the height of the lumber industry in Lycoming County, 1861–1891, the various mills produced 5,500 million board feet (13,000,000 m^{3}) of lumber. Williamsport became one of the most prosperous cities in Pennsylvania and in the United States. Men like James H. Perkins, Peter Herdic, and Mahlon Fisher became millionaires while many of the men who actually worked in the river struggled to survive on the wages paid to them by the lumber barons.

== Daniel Hughes ==
Daniel Hughes was a conductor in the Underground Railroad based in Loyalsock Township and Williamsport He was the owner of a barge on the Pennsylvania Canal and transported lumber from Williamsport on the West Branch Susquehanna River to Havre de Grace, Maryland. Hughes hid runaway slaves in the hold of his barge on his return trip up the Susquehanna River to Lycoming County where he provided shelter on his property near the Loyalsock Township border with Williamsport before moving further north and to eventual freedom in Canada. Hughes' home was located in a hollow or small valley in the mountains just north of Williamsport. This hollow is now known as Freedom Road having previously been called Nigger Hollow. In response to the actions of concerned African American citizens of Williamsport, the pejorative name was formally changed by the Williamsport City Council in 1953 after many meetings with the local chapter of the National Association for the Advancement of Colored People (NAACP). Some of the members involved in this effort were: Dr. Philip Gillette, a local dentist, Dr. Bruce Carricher, a professor at Bucknell University, Mr. Bruce Anderson, Mr. Oscar Fisher, Mr. & Mrs. Allen W. Bright.

== Grit ==
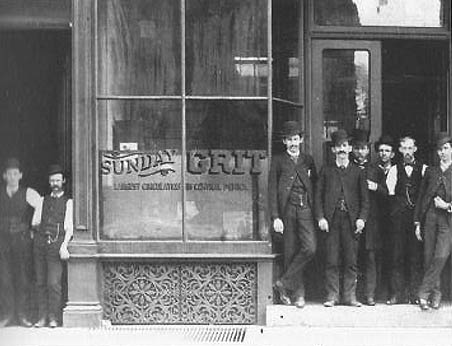
The Grit office as it looked in the 1890s: Publisher Dietrick Lamade is fifth from right, with the mustache.

Grit was a newspaper founded in 1882 as the Saturday edition of the Williamsport, Daily Sun and Banner. In 1885, the name was purchased for $1000 by 25-year-old German immigrant Dietrick Lamade, who established a circulation of 4000 during the first year. He operated from a third-floor single room, moving down to a storefront location in 1886, establishing a weekly circulation of 20,000 by 1887.

With rapid expansion, a horse-drawn wagon of Remington typewriters was delivered to the Grit offices in 1892. Displaying news and features aimed at rural America, Grit climbed to a weekly circulation of 100,000 by 1900, following an editorial policy outlined by Lamade during a banquet for Grit's employees.

Always keep Grit from being pessimistic. Avoid printing those things which distort the minds of readers or make them feel at odds with the world. Avoid showing the wrong side of things, or making people feel discontented. Do nothing that will encourage fear, worry or temptation... Wherever possible, suggest peace and good will toward men. Give our readers courage and strength for their daily tasks. Put happy thoughts, cheer and contentment into their hearts.

A familiar newspaper in small towns across the United States for over a century, Grit became a national institution. By the time of its 50th anniversary in 1932, 400,000 people bought the newspaper each week. That number had increased to 500,000 by 1934. Lamade, who retired in 1936, died in 1938, and his son, George Lamade, became the editor with grandson Howard Lamade Jr. serving as Grit's production manager. Another son, Howard J. Lamade, was vice president, and also served as a top executive with Little League Baseball, helping to build it into a national institution. The main stadium used for the Little League World Series, built on land donated by the Lamade family, is named Howard J. Lamade Stadium in his memory. Grit went to a tabloid format in 1944.

Grit was a pioneer in the introduction of offset printing. It was one of the first newspapers in the United States to run color photographs, with the first full color picture (of the American flag) appearing on the front page in June 1963. At its peak in 1969, Grit had a total circulation of 1.5 million weekly copies.

For decades Grit had published both a national edition and a local edition. The local edition was the Sunday newspaper for Williamsport and Lycoming County, Pennsylvania, and was circulated in 13 other counties in north-central Pennsylvania as well. This edition stopped publication in the early 1990s (and only then did the Williamsport Sun Gazette begin producing a Sunday paper).

== Fire of 1871 ==
Williamsport was devastated by a fire on August 20, 1871. The headlines of the local newspapers called it a "Terrible Conflagration" and a "Great Fire." The fire was started in a stable owned by C.M. Baker on what was then called Black Horse Alley, now known as East Church Street, just east of Williamsport's downtown. Strong winds blowing from the south caused the fire to spread very quickly. The fire, which began at 8:00 p.m., spread to the north and west. It consumed what was known as "Center Square" at the intersection of East Third and Mulberry Streets.

The Great Fire of 1871 caused more than $300,000 worth of damage. It was the worst fire to ever hit the downtown area in terms of area burned. The local landmarks that were damaged or destroyed by the fire included an old log building at the corner of Third and Mulberry Streets, the Russell Inn (this inn served as the first courthouse in Williamsport), and the Wayne Train Station, where an entire train of ten to fifteen cars and its engine were burned. Businesses destroyed by the fire included a confectionery shop, a millinery, and the Wavery House Inn. In addition to destroying several businesses many private homes of some of the leading citizens were destroyed by the fire. One church, the Mulberry Street Methodist Episcopal church, was destroyed. It had just been rebuilt after having been destroyed by another fire just three years earlier.

The competing fire departments of Williamsport made the situation surrounding the fire worse. The various fire departments competed with each other for the honor of fighting the fire and the money that went with successfully putting the fire out. They competed for access to the hydrants, and even fought one another for the water that was needed to fight the fire, as the fire raged around them and spread over many city blocks.

The exact cause of the fire has never been found. All that is known for sure is that it started in that stable on Black Horse Alley. In the immediate aftermath of the fire many "theories" about the cause of the fire abounded. One theory pointed to disgruntled Confederate sympathizers or infiltrators. The followers of the Southern cause were implicated in setting the fire as vengeance for their loss in the American Civil War which had just ended 6-years prior. Another theory placed the blame on newly arrived European immigrants. These immigrants were cited as possible arsonists because of their religious beliefs. They had remained at home while the "leading citizens" of Williamsport were temporarily out of town attending a revival camp meeting.

The Great Fire of 1871 was far from the last fire to destroy parts of downtown Williamsport, but it was the most devastating and controversial. The fire destroyed many historical landmarks and exposed a bias towards newly arrived European migrants that was fairly common throughout the United States during the Industrial Revolution.

== Little League Baseball ==
Carl Stotz, a resident of Williamsport, Pennsylvania, founded Little League Baseball in 1939. He began experimenting with his idea in the summer of 1938 when he gathered his nephews, Jimmy and Major Gehron and their neighborhood friends. They tried different field dimensions over the course of the summer and played several informal games. The following summer Stotz felt that he was ready to establish what became Little League Baseball. The first league in Williamsport had just three teams, each sponsored by a different business. The first teams, Jumbo Pretzel, Lycoming Dairy and Lundy Lumber were managed by Carl Stotz and two of his friends George and Bert Bebble. The men joined by their wives and another couple formed the first ever Little League Board of Directors. Stotz's dream of establishing a baseball league for boys to teach fair play and teamwork had come true.

The first Little League game took place on June 6, 1939. Lundy Lumber defeated Lycoming Dairy 23–8. Lycoming Dairy came back to claim the league championship. They, the first half season champions, defeated Lundy Lumber the second half champs in a best of three season ending series. The following year, a second league was formed in Williamsport, and from there Little League Baseball grew from three teams in a small Pennsylvania town to an international organization of nearly 200,000 teams in every U.S. State and over 80 countries all around the world.

== Historic buildings ==
The Peter Herdic House, Hart Building, Millionaire's Row Historic District, City Hall, Williamsport Armory, and Old City Hall are listed on the National Register of Historic Places.

== See also ==
- List of mayors of Williamsport, Pennsylvania
