= Herdic Phaeton Company =

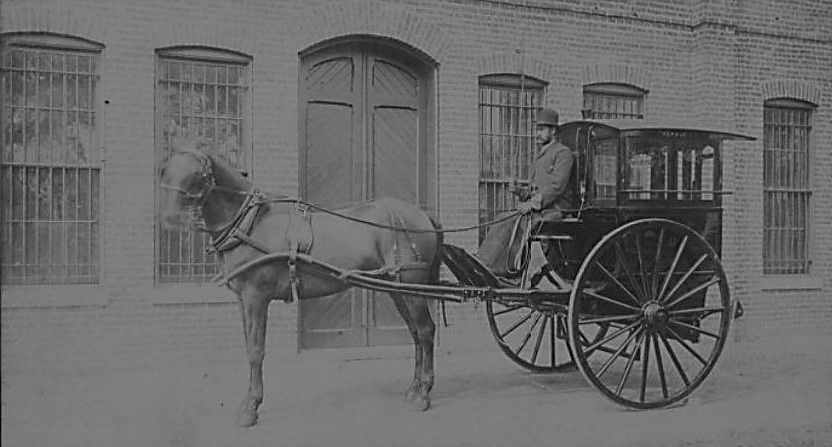
Photograph of the first time a herdic cab was ever used in Washington, D.C.; photo taken circa 1888

The Herdic Phaeton Company was a late nineteenth-century mass transit company that was located in Washington, D.C. The company derived part of its name from Peter Herdic, the designer of the horse-drawn carriage known as the Herdic.

Expanding on the success of Herdic's invention, which had increased in popularity since its launch three years earlier in Williamsport, Pennsylvania and had been used to create systems of inexpensive mass transportation in multiple major metropolitan across the United States, Herdic Phaeton started operations in December 1879, and quickly became known for running plushly-upholstered carriages from 22nd and G Streets NW in Washington, D.C., along G Street and Pennsylvania Avenue to the Navy Yard.

Competing directly with the Washington and Georgetown streetcars, the company continued to expand until 1887.

== History ==
In December of 1879, the Herdic Phaeton Company began operations. At its conception, the company operated a single route from 22nd and G Streets NW along G Street and Pennsylvania Avenue to the Navy Yard. Land was purchased at 10th and C Streets SE for the stables that would house the Herdic phaeton Company horses.

In 1883, the Herdic Phaeton Company expanded its operations and established a new route started at 11th and East Capitol Streets and travelled through East Capital Streets, Pennsylvania Avenue NW, and 15th Street NW. The line and ended at 15th and F streets.

In 1884, the Washington and Georgetown Railroad Company increased their presence around the Herdic Phaeton Company's 15th Street route. In response to the increasing competition on 15th street and the need for public transportation of 16th Street, the Herdic Phaeton Company rerouted its lines from 15th to 16th Street.

In 1886, the Herdic Phaeton Company expanded its operations for the last time, establishing new lines along I and K Streets.

Following the expansion of the Herdic chariot routes, the Herdic Phaeton Company received a permit to expand its stables in 1886.

Despite the expansion, the Herdic Phaeton Company began its decline in the years following 1886. By 1887 the Herdic Phaeton Company began to discontinue parts of its original lines as it struggled to compete with the Columbia Railway Company.

The Herdic Phaeton Company go on to serve the public for the next decade until Commodore Potts, the company's principal stockholder, died in 1896. Immediately thereafter, the Herdic Phaeton Company officially and indefinitely ceased its operations.

The Herdics were still run by the Metropolitan Coach Company after to dissolution of the Herdic Phaeton Company, but they were eventually phased out when the Metropolitan Coach Company began operating buses powered by gasoline motors in 1909.

Two of the company's waiting stations, nicknamed "herdics", still exist on the Capitol grounds near the East Front.

== See also ==
- Herdic
- Peter Herdic House
