= History of logging in Pennsylvania =

From the 17th century

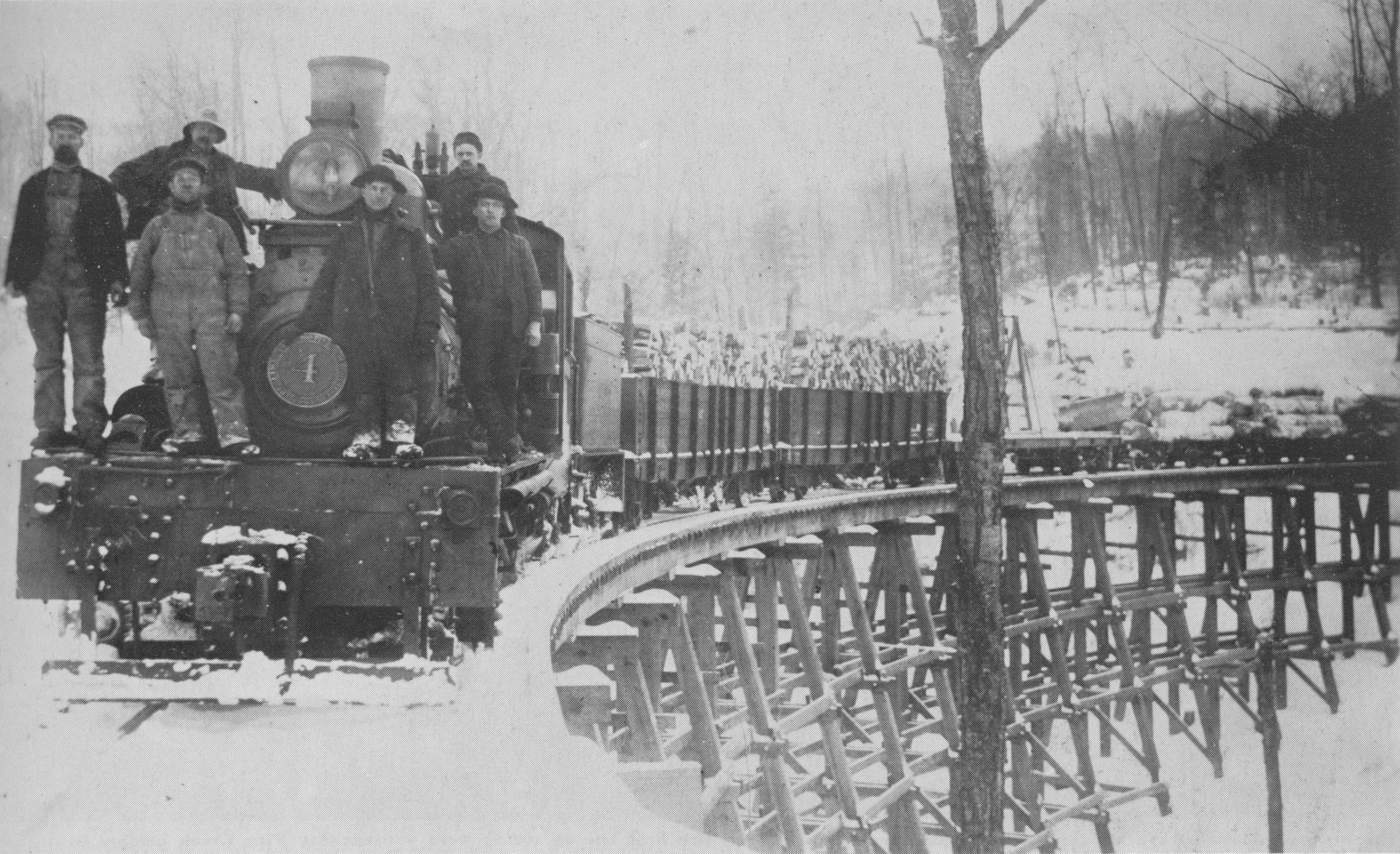
Logging train on a trestle bridge in what is now Colton Point State Park, Pennsylvania, USA, early 20th Century.

The American state of Pennsylvania has a history of logging dating back to its earliest settlers in the 17th century, with the development of many techniques that were later used throughout the United States while exhibiting a strong influence on the economics and industry of the region.

== Early history and growth ==
Prior to the arrival of William Penn and the Quaker colonists in Pennsylvania in 1682, the territory that now comprises the state was estimated to be more than 90% percent forested. White pine, Eastern hemlock, and various hardwoods were most prevalent. White pine trees grow tall and straight, making them ideal for masts on ships. Hemlock trees were coveted for their bark, which yields tannic acid that in turn is used in the production of leather. Pennsylvania’s first sawmills started operating in the Philadelphia area as early as the 1680s, almost immediately after Penn founded the colony. The forests near the early settlements in Philadelphia and in the current Bucks, Delaware, and Montgomery Counties were the first to be harvested as the early settlers used the region's plentiful timber to build homes, barns, and ships. The timber also supported the early development of other industries including barrels, rifle stocks, and shingles and fenceposts for housing construction.

After exhausting the forests of southeastern Pennsylvania, loggers spread generally to the northwest, reaching central Pennsylvania by the mid-1800s, then the north-central and northwestern regions of the state by the late 1800s. Small operators often acquired forested tracts to harvest trees for the construction industry. In many cases, these forested lands were purchased for relatively inexpensive sums, from county officials who craved tax revenues while trying to attract industry to their areas. Many communities had small water-powered sawmills as their primary industrial facilities. Large tracts of forest were purchased by ironmakers to obtain trees that were slowly cooked into charcoal, which in turn fueled early iron furnaces.

The Pennsylvania logging industry grew in tandem with the state's burgeoning coal mining industry, with felled trees used in great quantities for the reinforcement of mine shafts and tunnels. Other logs were transported to market via wagon trains at first, followed by narrow-gauge railroads that soon proliferated across the state. While the rugged terrain of the Appalachian Mountains in the central parts of the state initially deterred large-scale logging, the high demand for wood products spurred the development of railroads to less accessible areas. In the late 1800s, innovations such as the Shay locomotive, the steam-powered loader, and the steam-powered skidder allowed massive logging of remote forest areas. Early Pennsylvania railroads like the Jersey Shore, Pine Creek and Buffalo Railway pioneered techniques to build tracks in previously inaccessible rugged areas and to transport felled trees to market. Logs were also floated down waterways to significant timber market towns like Williamsport; this transport technique was typically supported by splash dams, the construction methods for which were largely developed in Pennsylvania and the surrounding region.

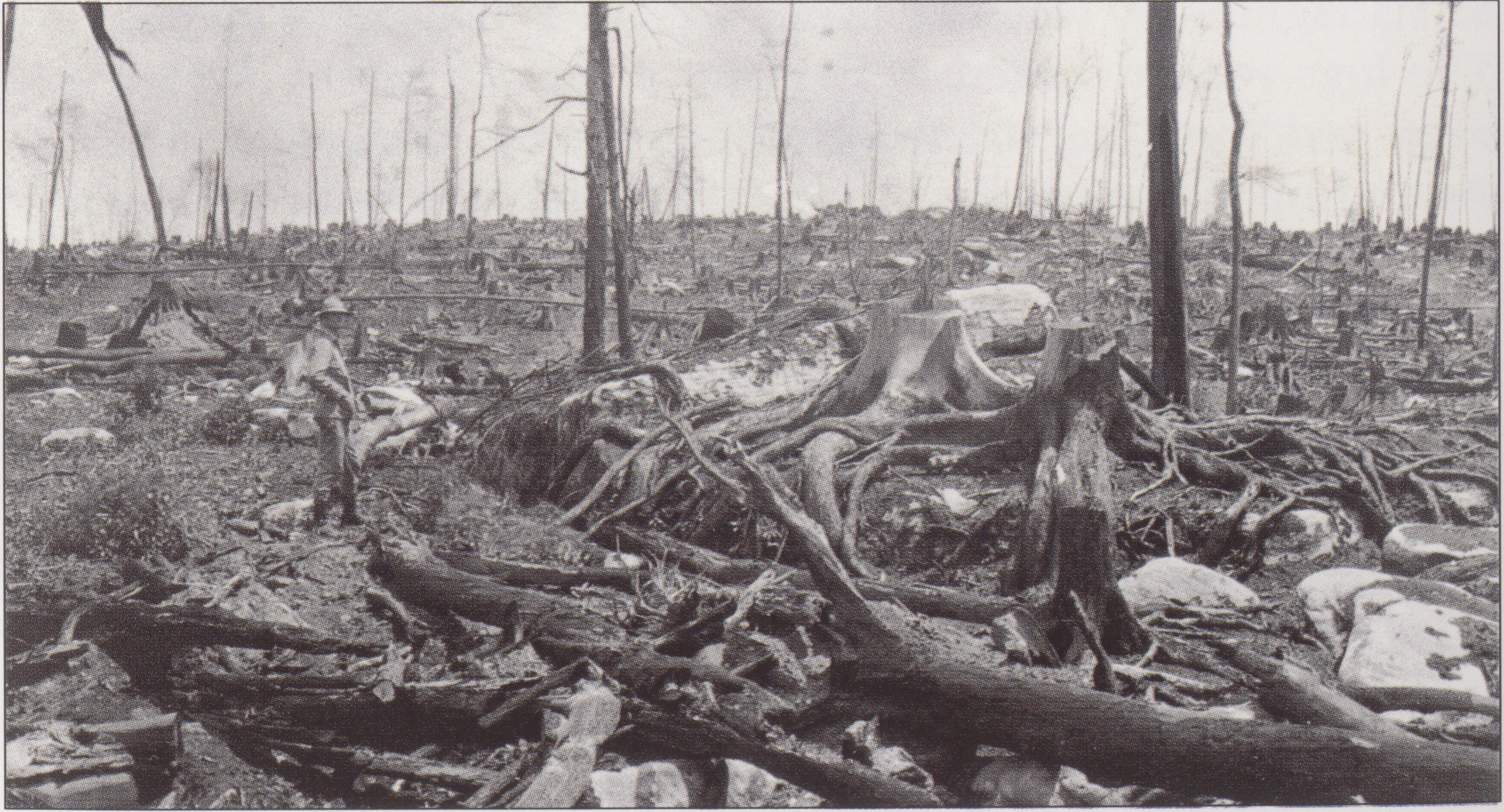
Clearcut wasteland known as the "Pennsylvania Desert," early 20th Century.

The Pennsylvania timber market was largely developed by experienced loggers from New England like John Leighton and James Perkins, who established operations in Williamsport in the 1840s. The Susquehanna Boom was developed during this period, in the form of a chain of connected floating timbers extended across the West Branch Susquehanna River to manage the flow of logs downstream. The Susquehanna Boom was in operation for over 50 years, and it processed over 5.5 billion board feet (13 million m³) of lumber until the early 1900s, which led to Williamsport being named "Lumber Capital of the World" during that era.

Logging firms often housed workers at hastily constructed camps that developed into functioning towns with hundreds of residents and full services. Many such towns have since disappeared, having been abandoned when local trees ran out and the loggers moved on. Ironically, forests have reclaimed most such settlements. Logging was a primary industry in Pennsylvania until approximately the turn of the 20th century, by which time most of the state's old growth forests had been denuded. By the end of the era, most of Pennsylvania consisted of “stumps and ashes” as described in a 1995 government report. Clearcutting, as well as sparks from trains and other automated processes, also resulted in many wildfires. By the end of the era, most of the non-residential areas of Pennsylvania were almost entirely portioned out to logging firms. Most such areas were clearcut, due to the drive to maximize profits and primitive knowledge of the long-term environmental effects.

== Decline and forest remediation ==
After Pennsylvania's old-growth forests were almost entirely clearcut, loggers and their employers moved on to other states. Settlers often arrived in clearcut areas, hoping to convert them to agriculture, which was only found to be viable in some portions of the Pennsylvania landscape, much of which is rugged and hilly. In the more rugged areas, farmers often attempted to convert clearcut areas to pasturelands and ranches. Such efforts typically failed, and those areas reverted to forest, but with an altered ecosystem of oak-dominant hardwoods without most of the aboriginal white pine and hemlock. Even before the logging industry had tired of the region, the state began to reclaim land in order to restore the forests, typically buying it cheaply from desperate owners who had failed to turn their lands into pasture or who sought forgiveness for delinquent tax bills. Pennsylvania's first State Forests were established in this fashion, starting in 1898 and with steadily increasing acreage protected over the following decades. Starting in the 1930s, the Civilian Conservation Corps was enlisted to rehabilitate clearcut areas across Pennsylvania by planting millions of trees; their efforts can mostly be seen in State Parks and State Forests. The history of the industry is now commemorated at several museums, most notably the Pennsylvania Lumber Museum.

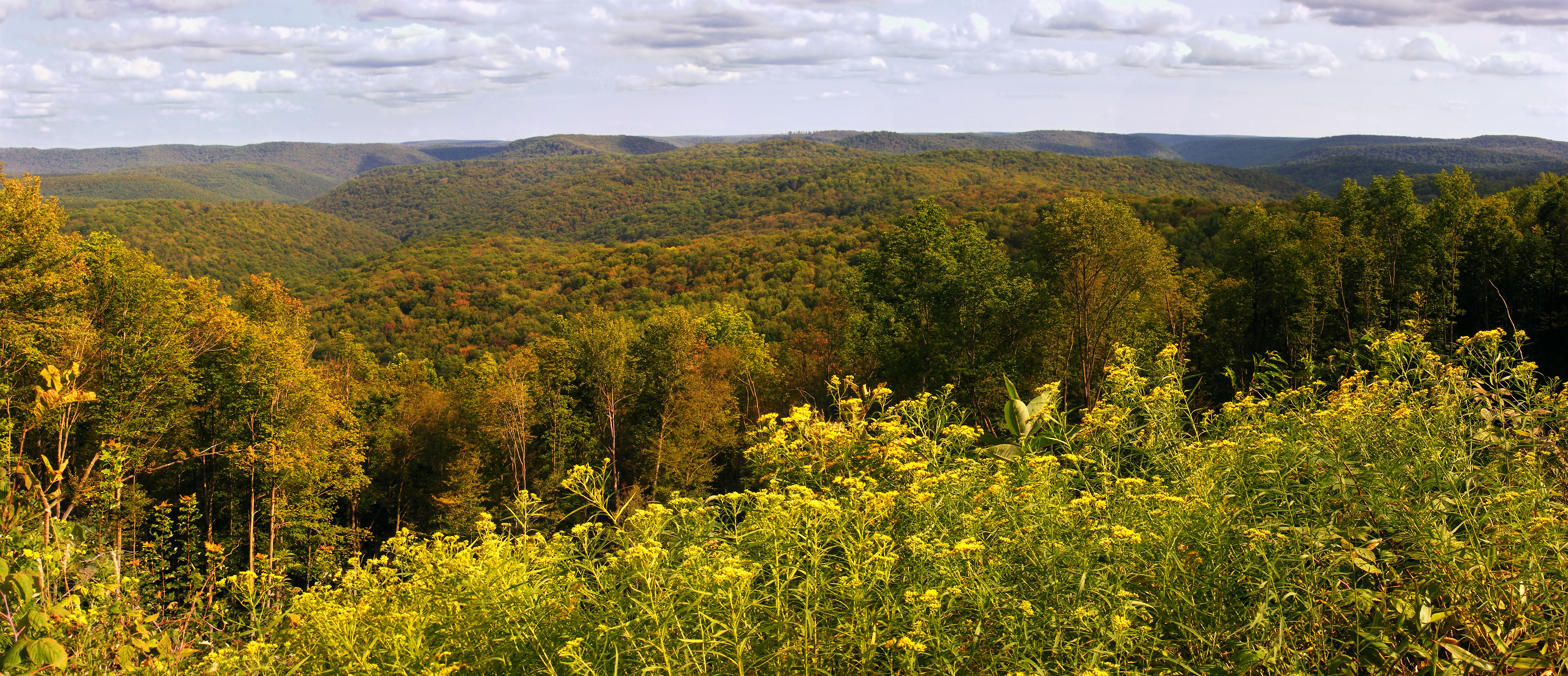
A modern photograph of Susquehannock State Forest, consisting largely of second-growth woods after recovering from the clearcut era.

Due to unreliable surveying methods, the boundaries between the parcels owned by neighboring companies were highly contested due to the value of the timber to be harvested. A company would not dare to harvest trees belonging to a competitor, and the fuzzy boundaries sometimes created no man’s lands where the trees survived due to competing companies trying to stay off each other’s turf. Ironically, this process created the few patches of undisturbed old-growth timber remaining in Pennsylvania, many of which are currently preserved as State Forest Natural Areas.

Pennsylvania’s forests, though they now feature altered ecosystems, partially recovered after the clearcutting ended, and now approximately half of the state features second and third-growth forests. However, many of these forests remain available to logging interests, and about one-fifth of the state's current forest lands are privately owned. Private landowners are permitted to sell timber to logging companies, but must observe state requirements for routing haul roads, minimizing erosion and fire hazards, and preventing damage to streams and wetlands. Many of Pennsylvania's remaining forests are protected in the form of State Forests, and occasionally as State Game Lands, but the state sells timber from these protected lands to logging firms as well. Clearcutting is no longer permitted in Pennsylvania, and loggers are required to leave a percentage of an area's trees standing to prevent complete destruction of the local ecosystem.
