= Pennsylvania Lumber Museum =

Museum in Pennsylvania, United States

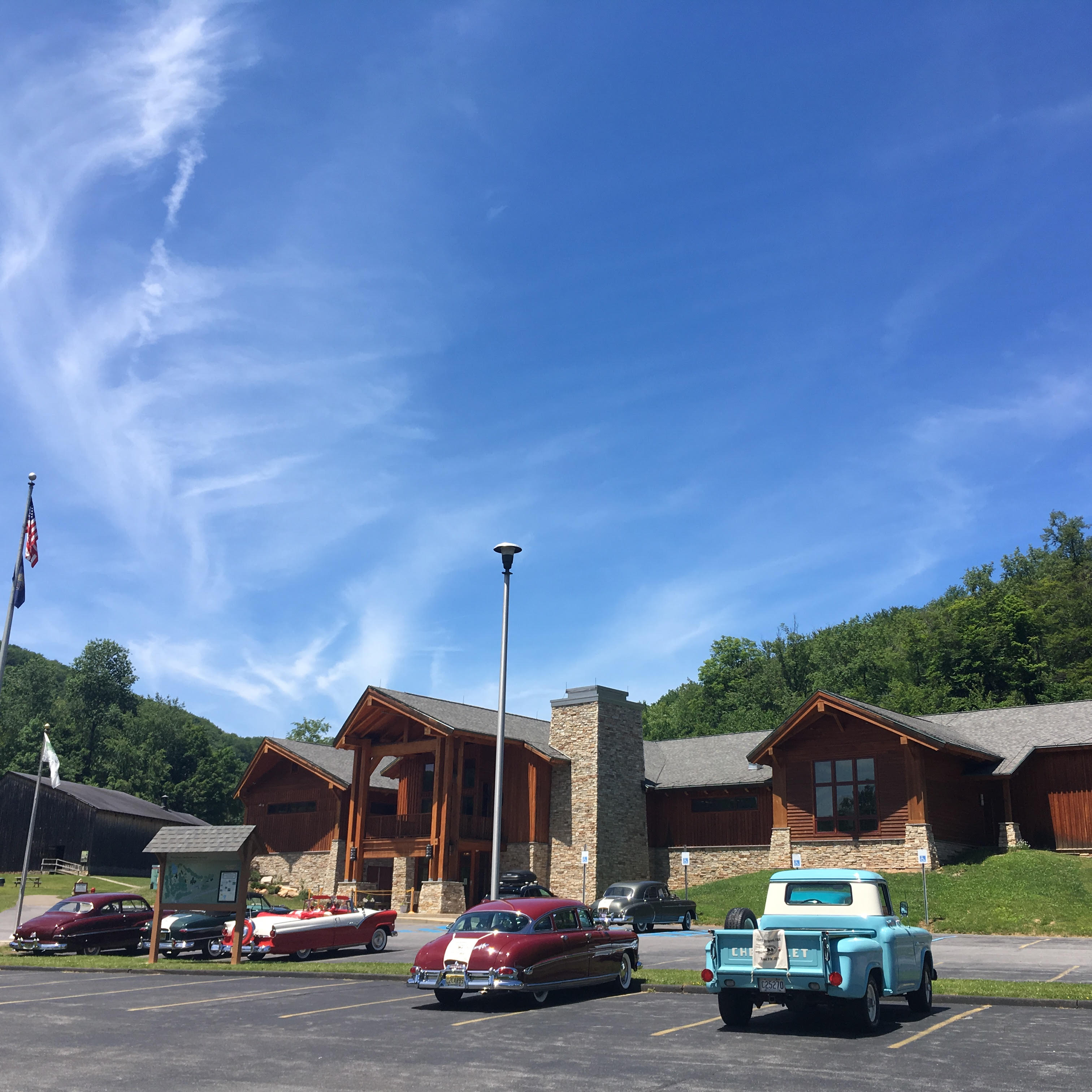
- The museum entrance in 2018
- Location: Ulysses Township, Potter County, Pennsylvania, USA
- Coordinates: 41°46′56″N 77°49′21″W
- Owner: Pennsylvania Historical and Museum Commission

The Pennsylvania Lumber Museum is near Galeton, Potter County, Pennsylvania in the United States.

== Description ==
The museum documents the history and technology of the lumber industry, which was a vital part of the economic development and ecological destruction of Pennsylvania. It includes a visitor center and several replica buildings that illustrate the industrial processes and lives of loggers during the heyday of the Pennsylvania logging industry in the late 1800s.

The museum specializes in preserving and displaying period technologies, including logging locomotives and sawmill equipment. It is included in a state project called the Pennsylvania Lumber Heritage Region to highlight the region's history and to bring tourism to Potter County, and it was developed sporadically with state assistance beginning in the late 1960s. In 2016 the museum received the Award of Merit from the American Association of State and Local History. In 2025, it was named one of the twelve best museums in Pennsylvania.

The museum conducts tours of the grounds, educational workshops, and classes. It also hosts occasional lumberjack competitions and an annual fall festival that encourages local communities to view the grounds and exhibits. The grounds include a rustic cabin that had been inhabited by longtime Pennsylvania forester Bob Webber; shortly after Webber's death in 2015, his cabin was moved intact from his off-the-grid residence within Pine Creek Gorge. Webber was known for developing many hiking trails in nearby Tiadaghton State Forest, and hikers and history buffs lobbied for his cabin to be preserved on the grounds of the museum.

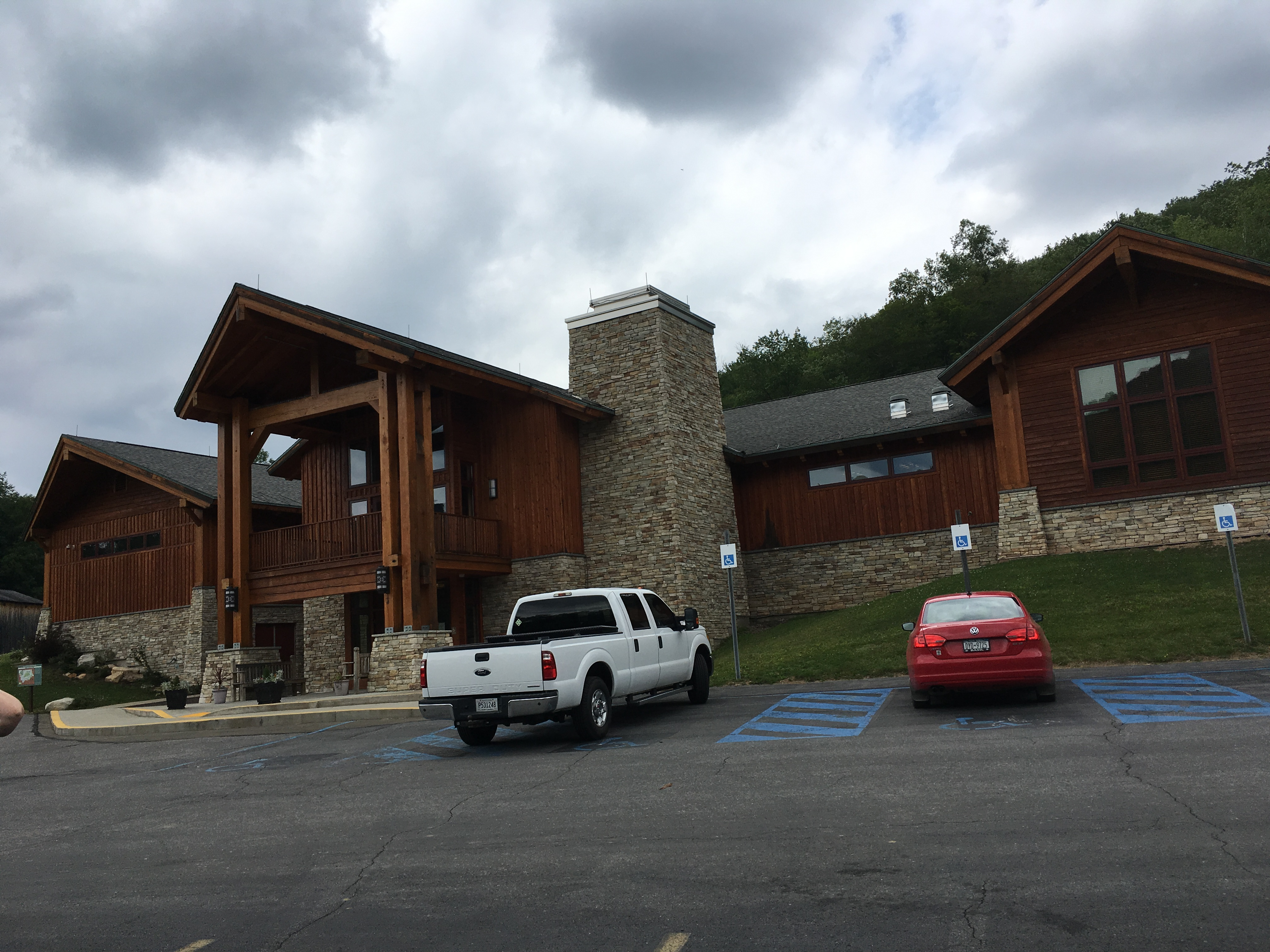
Visitor center

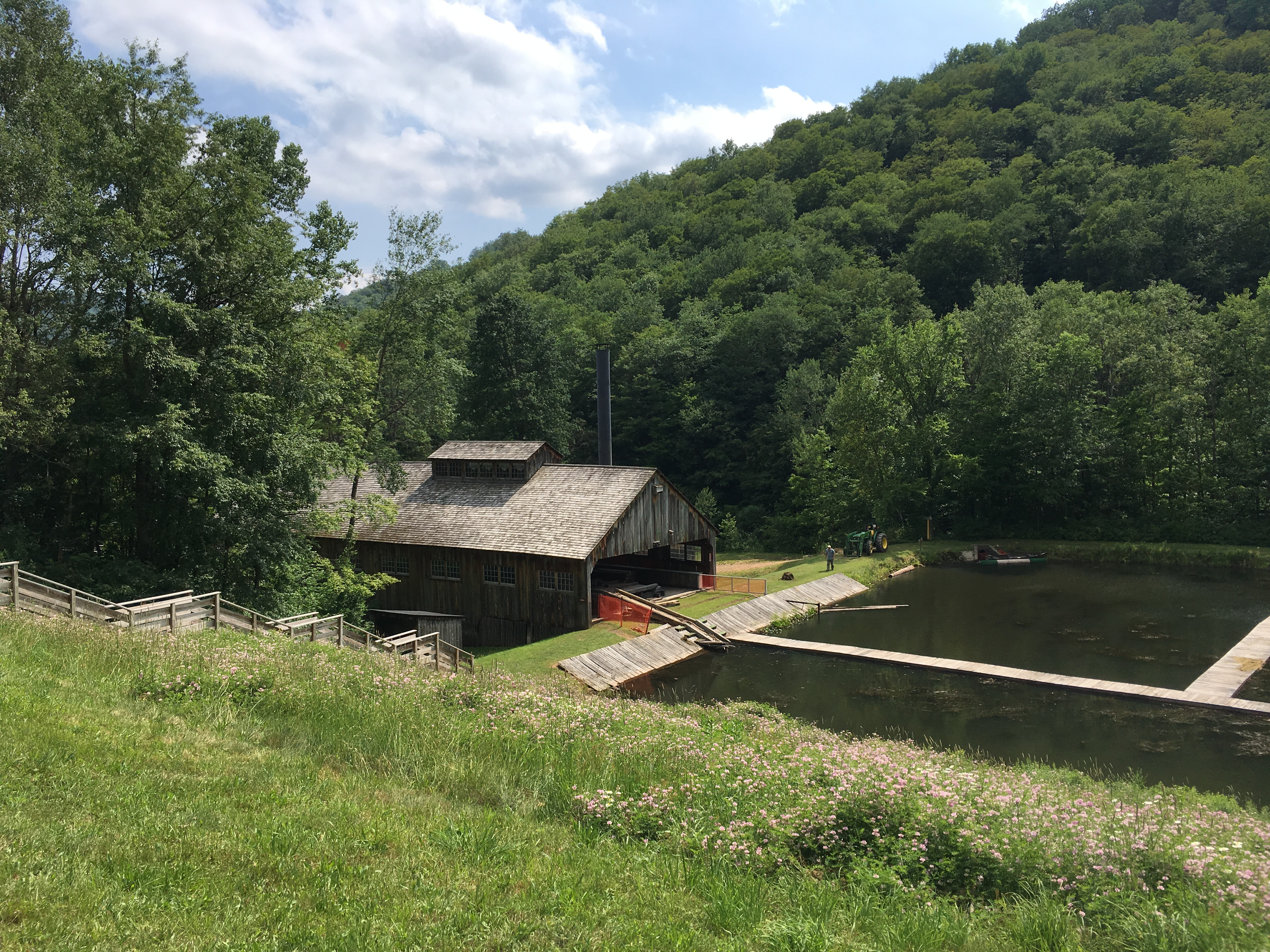
Replica sawmill and log pond

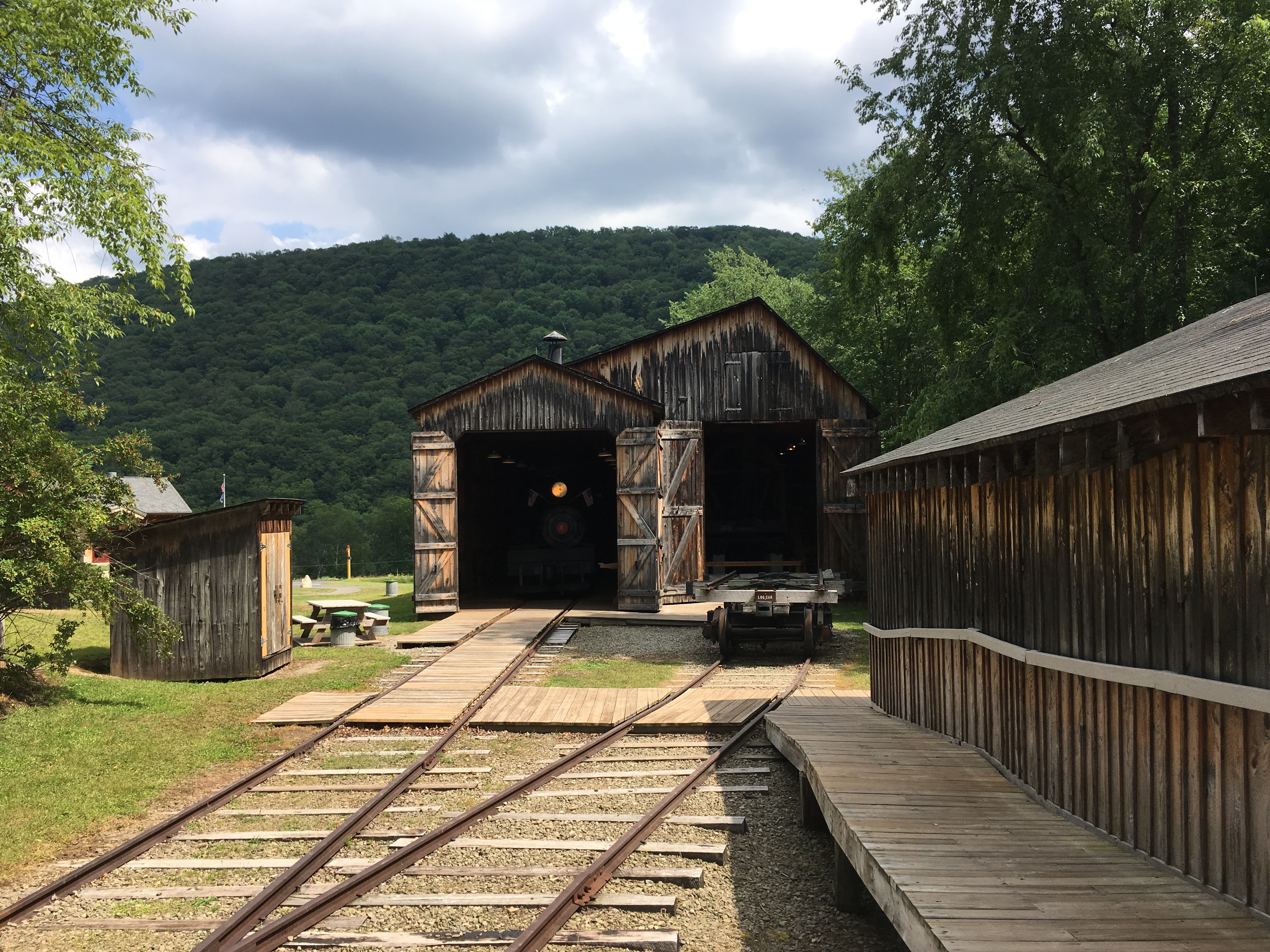
Replica engine house

== See also ==
- History of logging in Pennsylvania
