= Herdic =

Type of horse-drawn carriage

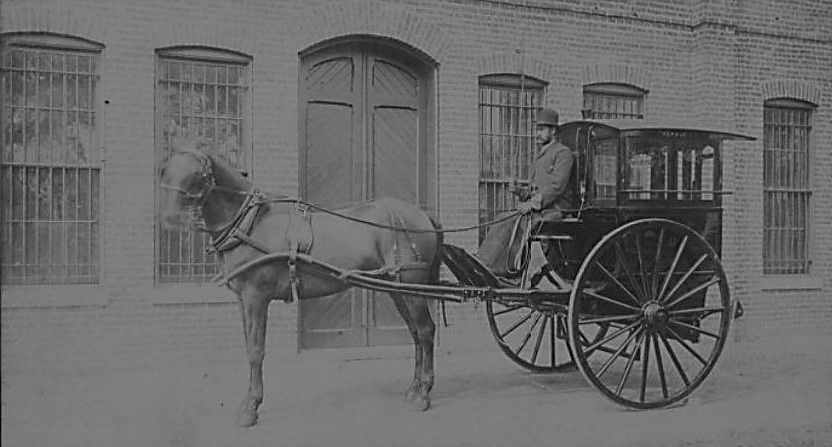
Photograph of the first time a herdic cab was ever used in Washington, D.C.; photo taken circa 1888

A herdic is a type of horse-drawn carriage, which was frequently used as an omnibus during the late nineteenth and early twentieth centuries. It was invented by Peter Herdic of Williamsport, Lycoming County, Pennsylvania during the 1870s and patented in 1880.

Shortly after the first vehicle's creation, fleets of herdics were purchased and used to create systems of inexpensive mass transportation in multiple major metropolitan across the United States, bolstering Peter Herdic's status as a successful inventor and millionaire.

Herdics were particularly successful in Washington, D.C., becoming the transportation method of choice during inclement weather due to the cab's rear entrance design, which enabled drivers to back their vehicles up to sidewalks and buildings so that their passengers could enter the cabs more quickly than they would with traditional hansom cabs.

The first herdic was used in Washington, D.C. in 1888. The last surviving herdic in operation in Boston, Massachusetts was owned and driven by Daniel C. Harris in 1910. His horse's name was Billy.

== Background ==
A predecessor of the taxicab, the herdic was a small two-wheeled carriage that had side seats and an entrance at the back. Later versions had four wheels and varied in size from a small coach to a full size omnibus. The first four-wheel herdic cabs carried up to eight passengers. The major improvements over previous types of carriage were in the springs, the way the body is mounted on the springs, and the manner in which the axles, springs, body and shaft were connected. Herdics were designed as passenger vehicles, and, in particular, for use in public transportation. Their low entry made it easy for passengers to enter and exit the cars. This was especially advantageous for the women of the time, who wore full length dresses.

The earliest herdics were painted bright yellow in order to be easily identified and quickly acquired the nickname "canary". This convention is presumably what led to many taxi cabs being painted yellow. Each cab was small enough to move freely through the city streets of Williamsport and leave its passengers at the curb instead of the middle of the street as other modes of public transportation were forced to do. The newest herdic models of 1881 featured gas lighting. The gas reservoir was positioned under the driver's seat.

Cab interiors were described by Washington, D.C.'S Evening Star newspaper as "boxlike compartments with glass doors, nicely cushioned and elegantly finished in a rich olive green."

Detail of the patent application for the Herdic carriage

Peter Herdic found surprisingly rapid success with his cab design when it was quickly adopted in the cities of Boston, Chicago, Philadelphia, New York, Washington, D.C., and numerous other locations. He ran into difficulty in Philadelphia, however, when the Herdic Personal Transportation Company, the company he had begun business with there in 1880, failed to follow through on the provisions of an agreement which promised Herdic 12,500 shares of its stock in return for Herdic allowing the company to use his patent on five hundred of the company's coaches, and that Herdic's stock shares would be increased to 50,000 should the company begin using Herdic's patent on additional coaches over and above the initial five hundred. Herdic contended that the company violated the agreement during the summer of 1880 when it communicated, via multiple newspaper reports, its intent to build 4,000 coaches using Herdic's patent without further compensating him. Unable to resolve the agreement's breach to his satisfaction, Herdic applied for an injunction against the company in June 1881. In his legal response to Herdic, Kelley admitted both that he had entered into the contract with Herdic on July 31, 1880 and that Herdic was the holder of the patent for running gear that was at the root of the men's dispute, but claimed that Herdic's coach invention was neither useful, nor valuable.

As this legal situation was unfolding, Herdic traveled to Omaha, Nebraska in August 1881 to expand the reach of his business. Its new coach system began operating just weeks later, on September 1.

The next year, civic leaders in communities that hadn't yet developed their own versions of "the Herdic system" began openly lobbying Herdic and other businessmen to launch cab services that would utilize the new coaches. During the summer of 1882, Herdic's vehicles were already at work on the west coast of the United States. The first of his shipments to Portland, Oregon arrived aboard the steamer Oregon on July 26 with the expectation that the new cabs would travel on streets that the city's railroad system couldn't reach. The Herdic service that opened in Ogden, Utah that year operated routes on Fifth Street from the railroad depot down Main and First streets and from the depot down Fourth and Main to Eighth Street, with cabs departing every thirty minutes. A single fare cost ten cents with ticket packages offered at discount rates of three for twenty-five cents, seven for fifty cents, or sixteen for one dollar.

By 1883, herdics were operating in Atlanta, Georgia and in Austin and Fort Worth, Texas. A hotel proprietor in Denver, Colorado and other entrepreneurs from a wider range of companies also began purchasing Herdics for their own operations. The city had already had ten herdics in operation by 1881.

The first of Herdic's coaches to operate in San Francisco, California began rolling down Montgomery Street on New Year's Day in 1884. Meanwhile, in Washington D.C. that same year, the cost of a herdic cab ride in Washington was twenty-five cents per person or one dollar per hour for a cab that held four people. Herdic car companies in the city sold tickets in groups of six, which were usable on any herdic or other street-car line. A special rate of two cents per trip was charged by herdics for the route which took passengers down Fourteenth Street to the United States Department of the Treasury's monument and printing bureau, and another special rate of three cents per trip was charged by herdics traveling the two-mile route down Eighteenth Street and Pennsylvania Avenue to the wing of the United States House of Representatives at the U.S. Capitol. Herdic cab riders typically paid their fares by slipping their tickets into small boxes similar in size and shape to the ticket boxes used on bobtailed cars.

But Peter Herdic's ability to enjoy his latest round of success would prove to be short lived. After achieving millionaire status within a few years of his having introduced the horse-drawn cab that bore his name and made him famous as an inventor, Herdic slipped on an icy walkway in Pennsylvania while inspecting another of his business ventures, the Huntingdon waterworks, in late January 1888. As he fell, he toppled down an embankment and hit his head, causing inflammation of the brain. He then traveled to New York for medical treatment; while there, his condition devolved into paralysis and then coma. He died at the Glenham Hotel in New York several days later, on March 2, 1888, while still in his early to mid-sixties. His death made the front-page news in multiple newspapers across the United States.

His death initially did not impact the continued distribution of his invention, however. In 1889, a group of civic leaders in Saint Paul, Minnesota established a committee which oversaw the promotion of stock sales to fund the purchase of new coaches in order to launch a new transit service for their city.

In 1897, the herdic system in Washington, D.C. nearly ended when one of the major companies involved in providing this mode of transportation—the Herdic Phaeton Company—ceased operations on March 31. The service was restored shortly thereafter, however, when Samuel G. Eberly of the Herdic Cab Company agreed to step in and take over Herdic Phaeton's routes.

In 1899, twenty aging herdics were shipped from Washington, D.C. to Cleveland, Ohio via the Pennsylvania Railroad to provide transportation services for passengers who normally rode the Consolidated Street Railway Lines, but were unable to do so during a strike by workers against the street railway.

In 1901, the Commissioners of the District of Columbia promulgated a series of cab rules and rates for transportation related to the Inaugural Ball, one of which dictated that herdic cab rides "to and from the ball" were not to exceed five dollars.

In 1913, one of the major operating entities in the herdic system changed hands again when Samuel G. Eberly, the longtime owner of the Herdic Cab Company, announced his planned retirement in June of that year. Edward F. Barker subsequently purchased the company and its equipment in July, and promised, via newspaper notices, to "continue the business at the same stand." The herdic cab was still in service in Washington, D.C. as late as 1918.

=== Cab leases with drivers ===
The Herdic Phaeton Company operated cab services in Boston and Washington, D.C. during the 1880s. In Boston, the company's procedure in 1885 was to lease its cabs by the day to individual drivers who were required to sign individual leases each day they took cabs from the company's stables. The contract stated:

"The Herdic Phaeton Company, in consideration of the rent herein reserved and paid in advance, hereby leases the cab, the number of horses named, and one harness, all as specified in the memorandum on the margin hereof, to the lessee named, herein, who leases the same to be used solely between the hours named in the margin hereof and on the date hereof only; and said lessee agrees to return the same to the lessor at the same stable whence he takes them, at the time named in the margin hereof, in as good condition as when delivered to him. And the said lessee hereby covenants and agrees that he has inspected said cab, horses and harness, at the time of their delivery to him, and that they are each and all in good condition and fit for the purpose for which he hires them, and properly adjusted. And the said lessee hereby assumes the entire responsibility of said horses, cab and harness during the term of this lease, and guarantees the lessor against all loss or damage that shall in any way arise therefrom during their use by him.

LEASE NO. A 1988. Boston.....................................188........
Cab Numbered..........................................
No. of Horses.........................................
Cab leased for ..................................hours
From.........................................................M.
To..............................................................M.
Rent paid in advance,...............................................

Herdic Phaeton Company Lessor, by ..............Sup't."

In 1885, drivers working for Herdic Phaeton in Boston paid the company $4.20 per day for their respective cabs, two horses and harness each, for twelve-hour shifts, plus thirty-five cents for each hour over the twelve hours if they opted to continue working, or were late in returning their cabs to the stable. Once per week, the company refunded ten percent of those charges to the driver if the driver had rented the cab for six days that week, reducing the driver's rental fee to $3.78 for that week. Herdic Phaeton's policy was to inspect and repair each of its seventy-two cabs every four months, and to sell off cabs after roughly eighteen months of use, or when a cab was deemed to be below the company's operating condition standards.

=== Damage to horses' health ===
As herdic use increased, newspapers across the United States began carrying reports of the physical harm done to the horses that pulled this particular style of cab. According to The St. Paul Daily Globe:

"These two-wheeled vehicle are very bad on the horses, except on very smooth streets. The vehicle which has two wheels ... is more affected by rough roads, and when one of the wheels strikes an obstacle the effect is felt by the horse. The result is that cabs are horse-killers.... Experience has taught us that with the best cab ... a horse does not last more than a year. The vehicle having but two wheels, a part of the weight necessarily comes on the horse's back."

Newspaper editors encouraged their herdic-using readers to direct their cab drivers to drive more slowly in hot weather, particularly on hilly routes that would tax the stamina of horses, and also suggested that their readers pay their drivers five or ten cents more per trip to ensure that the drivers took better care of their horses. Newspaper editors also urged their readers to "refuse to ride in any cab, herdic or carriage drawn by a docked horse, and tell the driver why." The process involved amputating a portion of the horse's tail to prevent it from becoming entangled with the harness and carriage equipment, a procedure which has fallen out of favor with multiple present-day veterinary and animal protection groups.

As herdic cabs were gradually replaced by newer, faster methods of transportation, horses faced even greater likelihood of injury due to the frequent number of accidents which occurred between cabs and automobiles or trolleys.

== See also ==
Peter Herdic House
