= Peter Herdic =

American politician

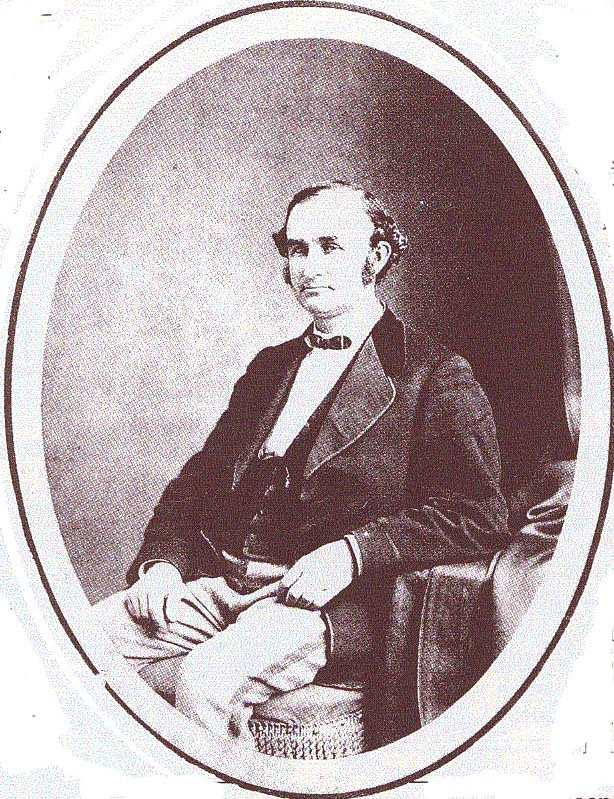
- Born: December 14, 1824; Fort Plain, New York
- Died: February 2, 1888 (aged 63); Huntingdon, Pennsylvania
- Occupations: philanthropist, lumber baron, entrepreneur, inventor, and politician
- Spouse(s): Amanda Taylor, Encie Maynard
- Children: Florence Louise with Amanda Peter Jr. and Henry with Encie
- Parent(s): Henry and Elizabeth

Peter Herdic (1824–1888) was a lumber baron, entrepreneur, inventor, politician, and philanthropist in Victorian-era Williamsport, Lycoming County, Pennsylvania, in the United States. He was the youngest of seven children born to Henry and Elizabeth Herdic on December 14, 1824, in Fort Plain, New York. Herdic's father died in 1826 and Elizabeth Herdic remarried shortly thereafter. She was widowed again prior to 1837 when she moved her family to Pipe Creek, New York, near Ithaca. Herdic attended school for just a few years while he worked on his mother's 50-acre (200,000 m^{2}) farm. Herdic left his mother's farm in 1846 and arrived in Lycoming County later that same year, where he settled in Cogan House Township.

Herdic would go on to become a millionaire and one of the wealthiest men in Pennsylvania, as well as a major figure in the development of the lumber industry throughout North Central Pennsylvania. Herdic donated large amounts of land and money to various churches in Williamsport. Peter Herdic was the inventor of the Herdic cab (a precursor to the taxi), which was a two-wheeled horse-drawn carriage with side seats and a rear entrance. Peter Herdic died on February 2, 1888, as the result of a concussion sustained when he slipped and fell on ice while inspecting his waterworks in Huntingdon, Pennsylvania.

== Early career ==
In the early 1840s, Herdic worked at a sawmill near his home in Upstate New York. In two years work there, he saved a considerable amount of money. After leaving his mother's farm in 1846, Peter Herdic settled along Lycoming Creek in Cogan House Township, Pennsylvania, just north of Williamsport. Here Herdic, with his business partner William Andress, opened a sawmill, using his saving for the purchase and initial operation of the sawmill. This was the first of Herdic's many business ventures, that led to his rise as one of the richest of millionaires in Williamsport.

Peter Herdic moved to Williamsport in 1854, which was then a small village of 1,700 people surrounded by vast stands of virgin hemlock, white pine and various hardwoods. The lumber industry had existed in Lycoming County since the first Europeans arrived prior to the American Revolution, but it did not become the land-changing and eco-system altering industry until Peter Herdic and men like him arrived on the scene in the mid-19th century. The lumber era began in force in 1846 when the Susquehanna Boom, a series of cribs for holding and storing floating logs on the West Branch Susquehanna River was built under the leadership of James Perkins. Herdic was able to use his business sense, leadership abilities, and according to some questionable business tactics to rapidly acquire wealth by buying and selling several tracts of timber and several sawmills. He used his gains to purchase several tracts of land in Williamsport, more sawmills, and eventually the Susquehanna Boom.

Peter Herdic and two business partners, Mahlon Fisher and John Reading, purchased the Susquehanna Boom and expanded it so that it could hold up to 300 million board feet (710 thousand m^{3}) of lumber. At this time, the most efficient sawmill in Williamsport could process only 100,000 board feet (240 m^{3}) of lumber in a week. At first, the sawmills could not keep up with the vast amounts of lumber floating in the West Branch. Approximately 60 sawmills along the river between Lycoming and Loyalsock Creeks operated day and night on a year-round basis. Peter Herdic, along with his partners and many other businessmen in Williamsport, eventually became wealthy. Williamsport became known as "The Lumber Capital of the World" with the highest number of millionaires per capita of any city in the United States.

== Leadership ==
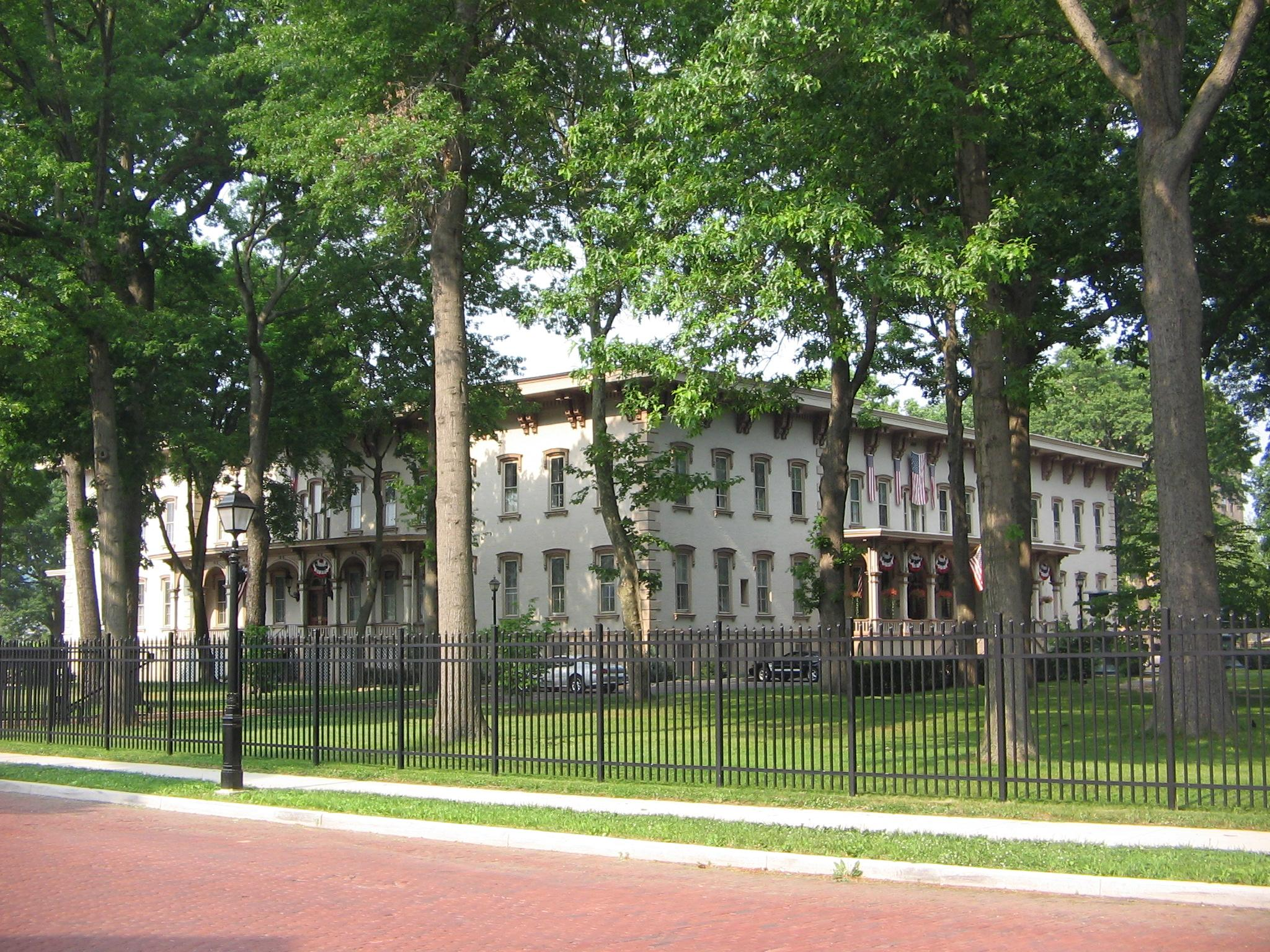
The former Herdic Hotel in Williamsport

Peter Herdic used his wealth to gain political power in Williamsport and Lycoming County, and led the drive to have Williamsport chartered as a city in 1866. He spent $20,000 to get elected mayor of Williamsport in 1869. Local saloon keepers reported that Herdic would leave $10 and $20 bills among the bottles of their taverns for anybody that would vote for him in the election. Prior to Herdic's arrival, the Newberry section of Williamsport was known as Jaysburg and had vied with Williamsport to be the county seat of Lycoming County. Herdic saw to it that the rival community on the west bank of Lycoming Creek would no longer compete with Williamsport by leading the cause to annex the community to Williamsport. Herdic had such influence that he was able to have the Philadelphia and Erie Railroad move their passenger station from the Pine Street area to his Herdic Hotel on West Fourth Street. Herdic was able to profit from this since the trains would now deposit their passengers at the door of his opulent hotel.

The Williamsport Passenger Railway Company was founded by Peter Herdic. This precursor to the trolley system, later followed by the bus system, was a form of public transit. It was one of Herdic's few business ventures that was not profitable. He divested himself of the Williamsport Passenger Railway Company in 1879, a time in Herdic's life when he lost most of his wealth (only to reacquire most of it soon after). Peter Herdic used his position as an owner of the Susquehanna Boom to maintain high levies on the lumbermen who floated their logs down the West Branch Susquehanna River. These lumbermen teamed together to seek relief from the high levies from the Pennsylvania General Assembly. Peter Herdic used his wealth and political connections to buy the votes of many of the members of the assembly. He had to borrow heavily against his holding to provide the legislators with the money needed for their votes. This heavy borrowing combined with the Financial Panic of 1873 lead to Peter Herdic's eventual bankruptcy in 1878.

Peter Herdic was knocked down, but he was not knocked out. He would regain his wealth soon after by leading the building of various waterworks in several U.S. cities including Selinsgrove and Huntingdon, Pennsylvania, Orlando, Florida, and Cairo, Illinois. He also continued to be a leading citizen of Williamsport.

== Injury, death and interment ==
During an inspection tour of one of his business ventures in Huntingdon, Pennsylvania in late January or early February 1888, Herdic slipped on an icy walkway, fell down an embankment and hit the back of his head, causing inflammation to the brain. He traveled to New York for medical care, where his condition devolved into paralysis and then coma. Herdic died several days later at the Glenham Hotel in New York on March 2, 1888. Still in his early to mid-sixties at the time of his death and leaving a wife and three children, his body was returned home to Pennsylvania, where it was interred at the Wildwood Cemetery in Lycoming County following funeral services. The official cause of death was listed as paralysis.

== Legacy ==
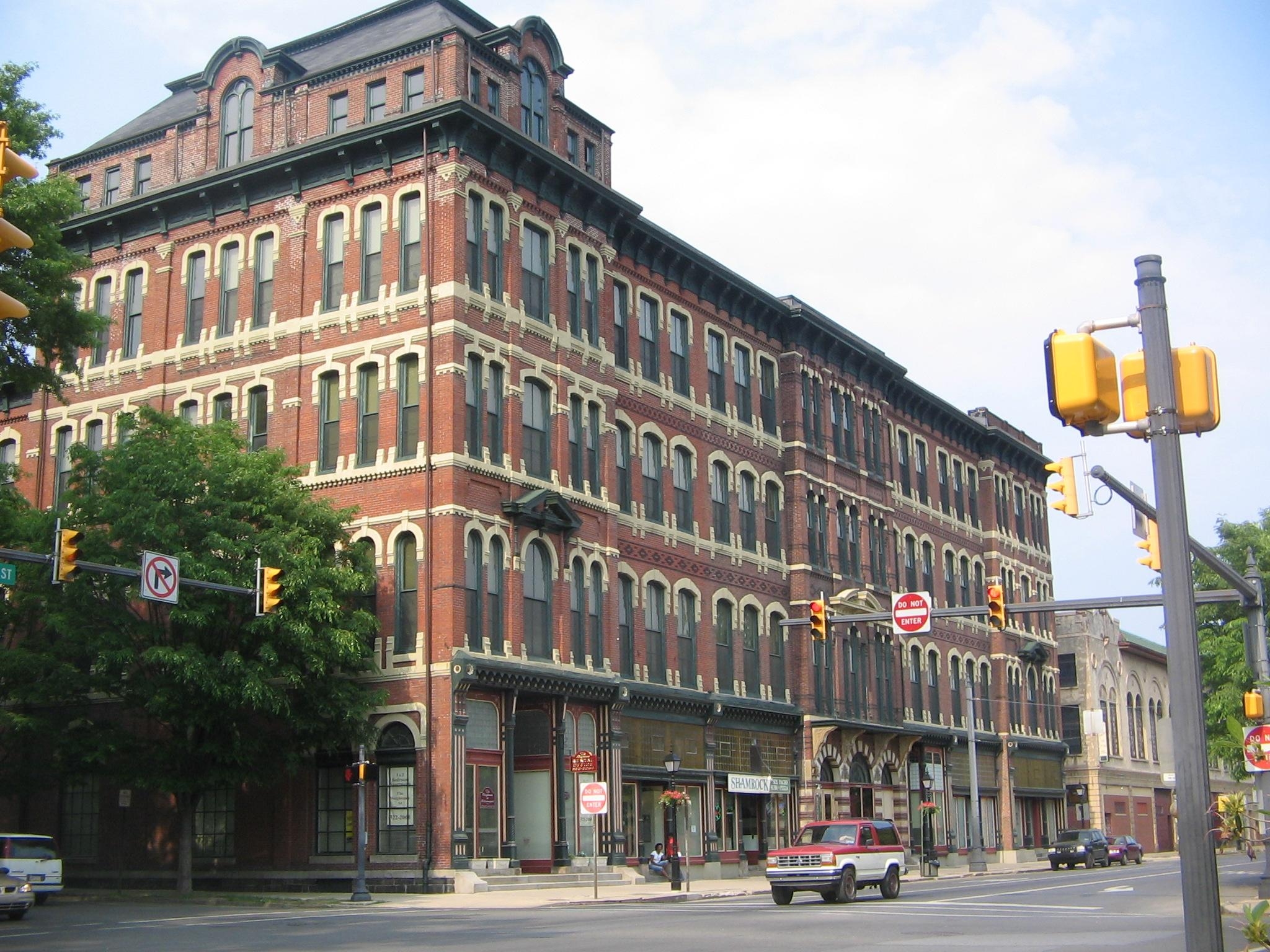
The Weightman Block was built by Herdic

Peter Herdic left his mark on Williamsport through churches, homes, hotels and other real estate developments. The Peter Herdic House, his personal mansion at 407 West Fourth Street stands today as a fine dining restaurant. It was listed on the National Register of Historic Places in 1978, and located in the Millionaire's Row Historic District. The house and a neighboring mansion were renovated in 1984 to a condition similar to when Peter Herdic lived there. It is an example of Italian Villa architecture with ornate plaster moldings and arches, a curving mahogany stairway and acanthus columns. The Peter Herdic Hotel, also on West Fourth Street, is now known as 800 Park Place. It is the home of two business and several apartments. It was previously served as a nursing home and hotel. The Weightman Block takes up on entire city block on West Fourth Street. Herdic had this block constructed in 1870. He had planned to use it as a center of business in downtown Williamsport. It included an opera house and fifth floor penthouse. Herdic was forced to sell it to William Weightman in 1878 after he declared bankruptcy. The Weightman Block was also renovated in the late 1990s it currently houses several small businesses on the ground floors with numerous apartments above.

Peter Herdic donated the land and or building materials for several of Williamsport's oldest and historic churches. Trinity Episcopal Church was funded entirely by Peter Herdic. He donated the land and paid for its construction. The structure was built in 1871 from mountain stone that was quarried from Bald Eagle Mountain near South Williamsport. Herdic also donated the land or provided funds for Annunciation Roman Catholic Church, First Baptist Church, First Evangelical Lutheran Church, the Congregational Church and Temple Beth Ha Sholom.

Detail of the patent application for the Herdic carriage

Peter Herdic's name will live on forever in the dictionary. His invention the herdic was a small two wheeled carriage that was towed by a horse. The cab had side seats and rear entrance. Many transportation historians regard the herdic as a predecessor of the taxicab. The first herdic cabs carried up to eight passengers. The earliest herdics were painted bright yellow and quickly acquired the canary nickname. Each cab was small enough to move freely through the city streets of Williamsport and leave its passengers at the curb instead of the middle of the street as other modes of public transportation were forced to do. Peter Herdic had moderate success with his cab and was able to sell it to the cities of Philadelphia and Washington, D.C. The herdic cab was in service in Washington as late as 1918.

Herdic's death in February 1888 was noted in the Sunday Grit as the passing of a leader and philanthropist. "Peter Herdic as really the father of Williamsport. He was a progressive citizen; whatever may be said by his enemies, it cannot be denied that had it not been for Peter Herdic, Williamsport might be nothing more than a village of a few thousand inhabitants." An editorial in the Williamsport Sun Gazette on March 4, 1988, marking the 100th anniversary of his death stated, "Historians have been unable to settle on Herdic as a hero or a scoundrel for his financial dealings so he remains somewhere in-between a century later. The mark he made on the city of Williamsport is indelible."

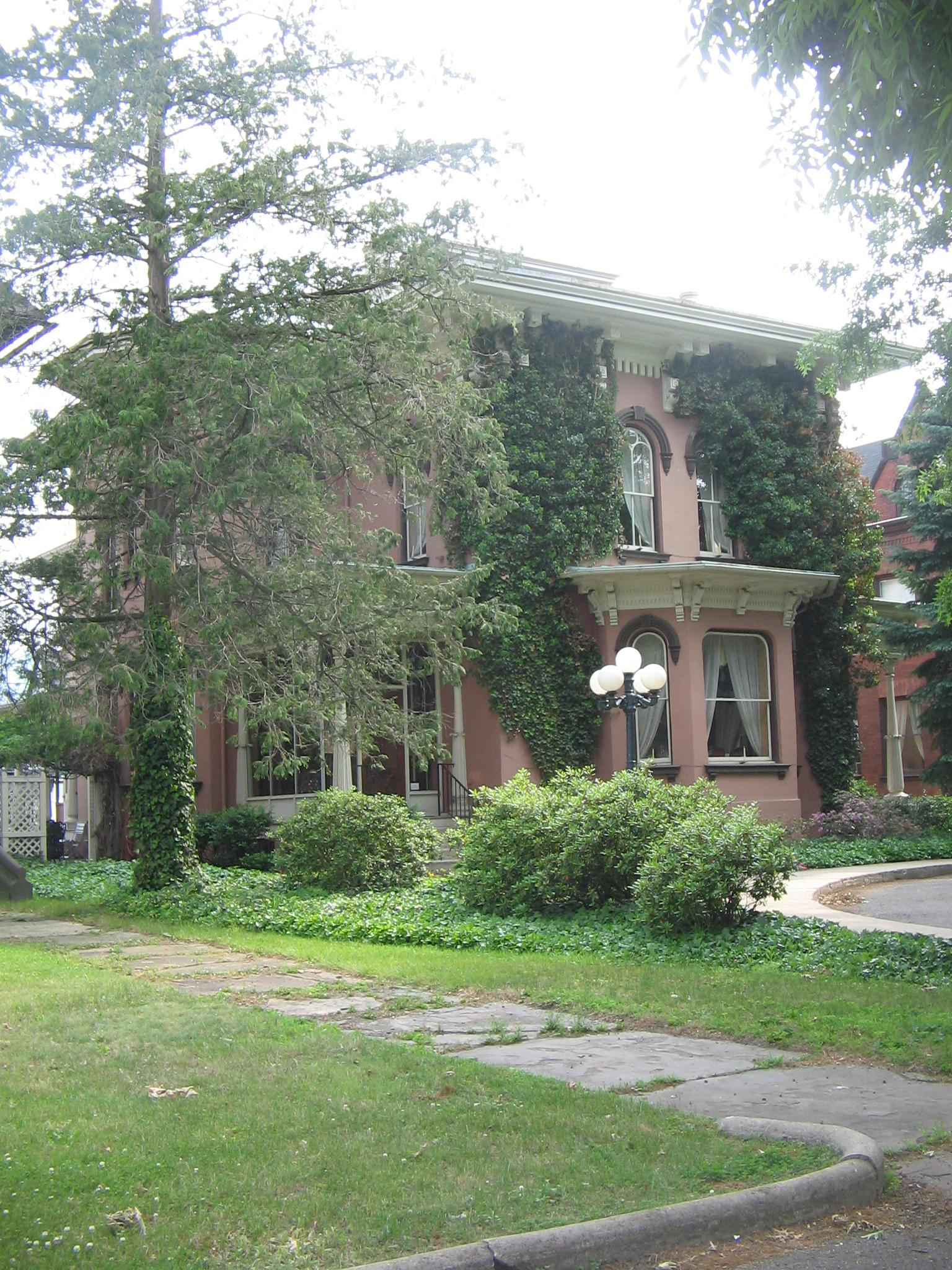
Herdic's house in Williamsport

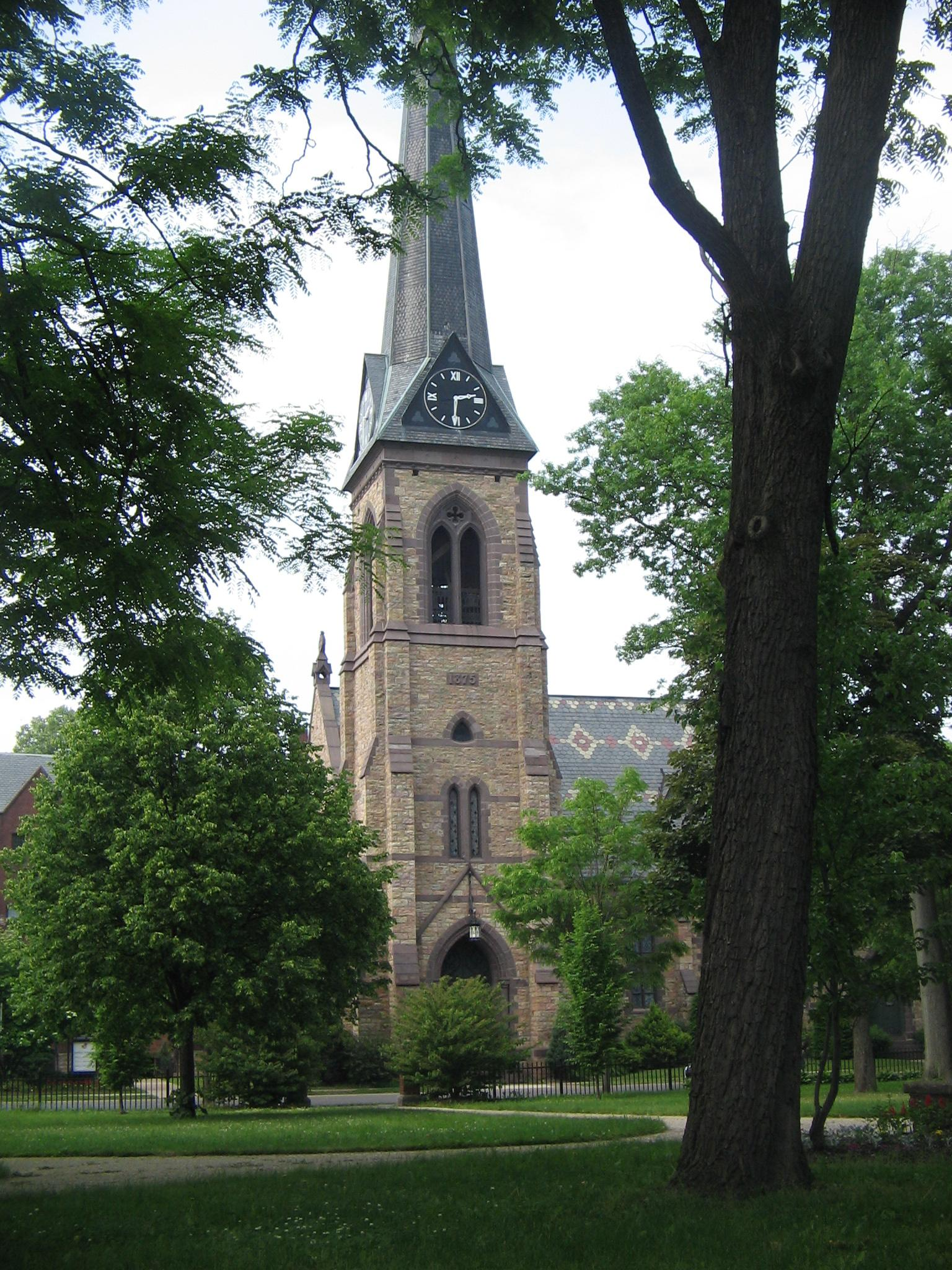
Trinity Episcopal Church

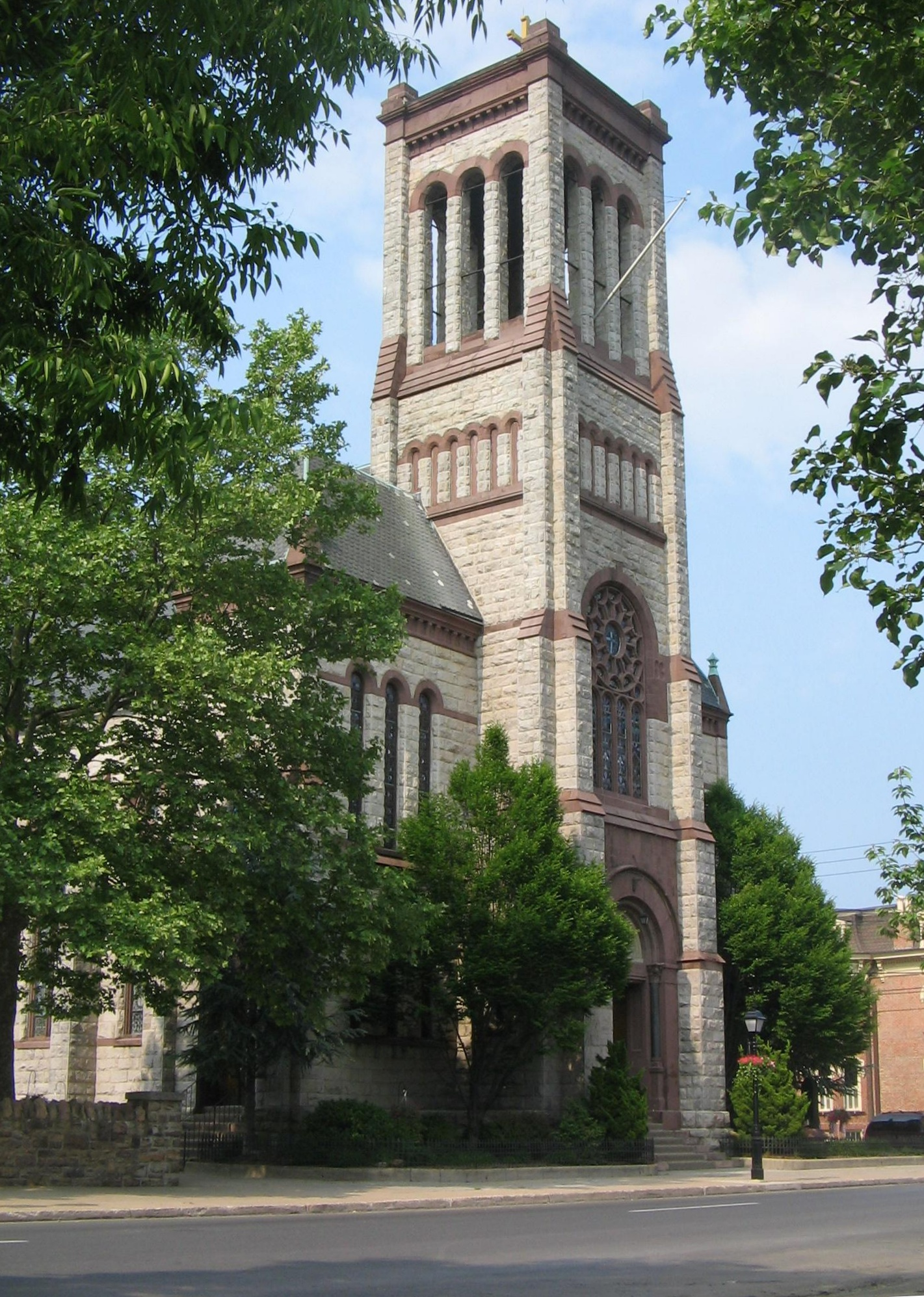
Annunciation Roman Catholic Church

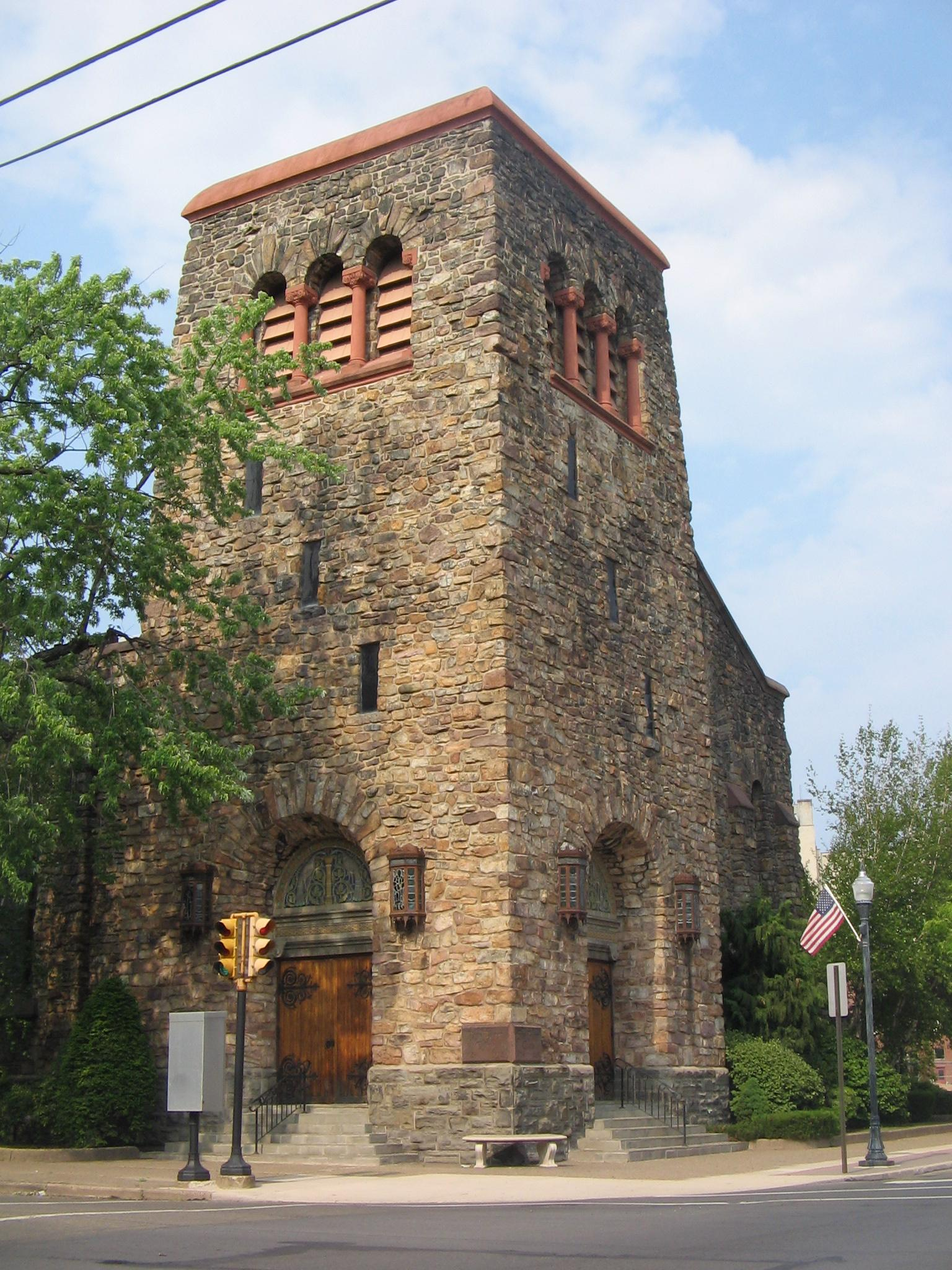
First Baptist Church

Political offices
Preceded by William F. Logan	Mayor of Williamsport, Pennsylvania; 1869–1870	Succeeded by James H. Perkins
