= Trinity Episcopal Church (Williamsport, Pennsylvania) =

Coordinates: 41°14.383′N 77°1.128′W

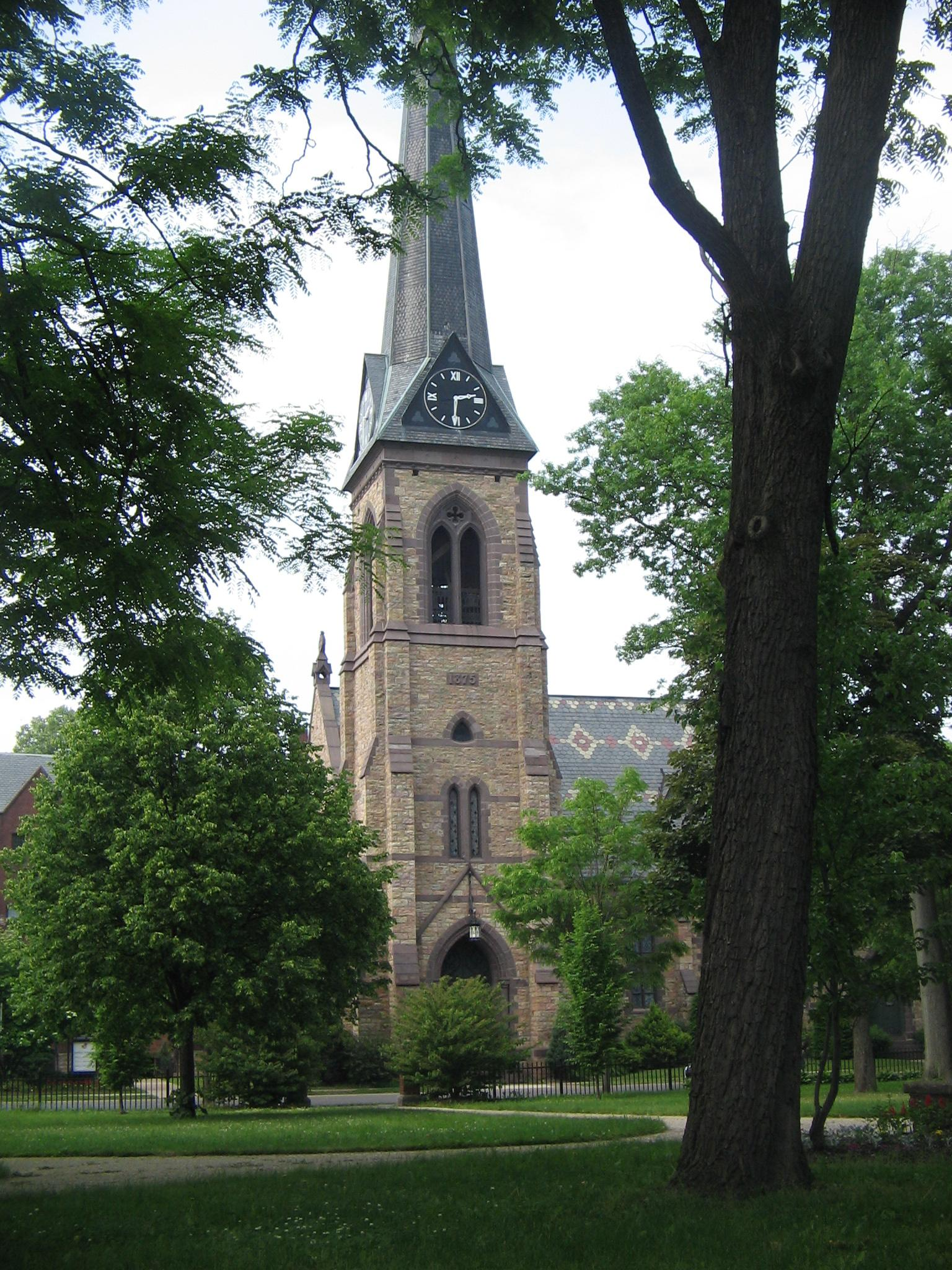
Trinity Episcopal Church (Williamsport, Pennsylvania)

Trinity Episcopal Church is an historic church located in north-central Pennsylvania, at 844 West Fourth Street, Williamsport, Pennsylvania. Built in 1875 and consecrated in February 1876, it is the largest of the Episcopal churches in the city. Preservation Williamsport includes the church on its first trolley tour stop.

The church structure was given to the parish by Peter Herdic. Trinity Church is currently the Pro-Cathedral of the Diocese of Central Pennsylvania. The current rector of Trinity Parish and provost of the pro-cathedral is The Reverend Canon Kenneth E. Wagner-Pizza.

== History of Trinity ==
Trinity is an exceptional example of 19th-century ecclesiastical gothic architecture that would not have been possible without the financial backing and vision of two Williamsport residents, Peter Herdic and Eber Culver.

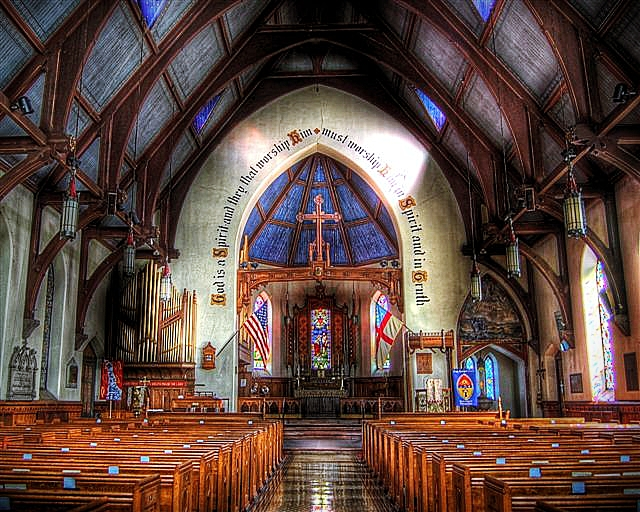
Church Interior

Peter Herdic was an entrepreneur and Williamsport mayor in the 1860s and 1870s. Eber Culver designed and oversaw the construction of the 210-foot spire and Fred G. Thorn designed the floor plans for the church.

The cornerstone for the church was laid on Saturday, July 15, 1871. The stone that embraces Trinity’s facade was quarried from Bald Eagle Mountain. Peter Herdic underwrote the cost of the construction, and donated the organ and tower clock at a cost to him of $80,000.

Later, in 1875, Judge Maynard donated the nine-bell chime. The chime mechanism was designed by E. Howard & Co. to sound the Westminster Quarters. According to church records, this was the FIRST tower clock in the United States to sound this chime sequence originally heard in the Tower Clock of the Palace of Westminster in London.

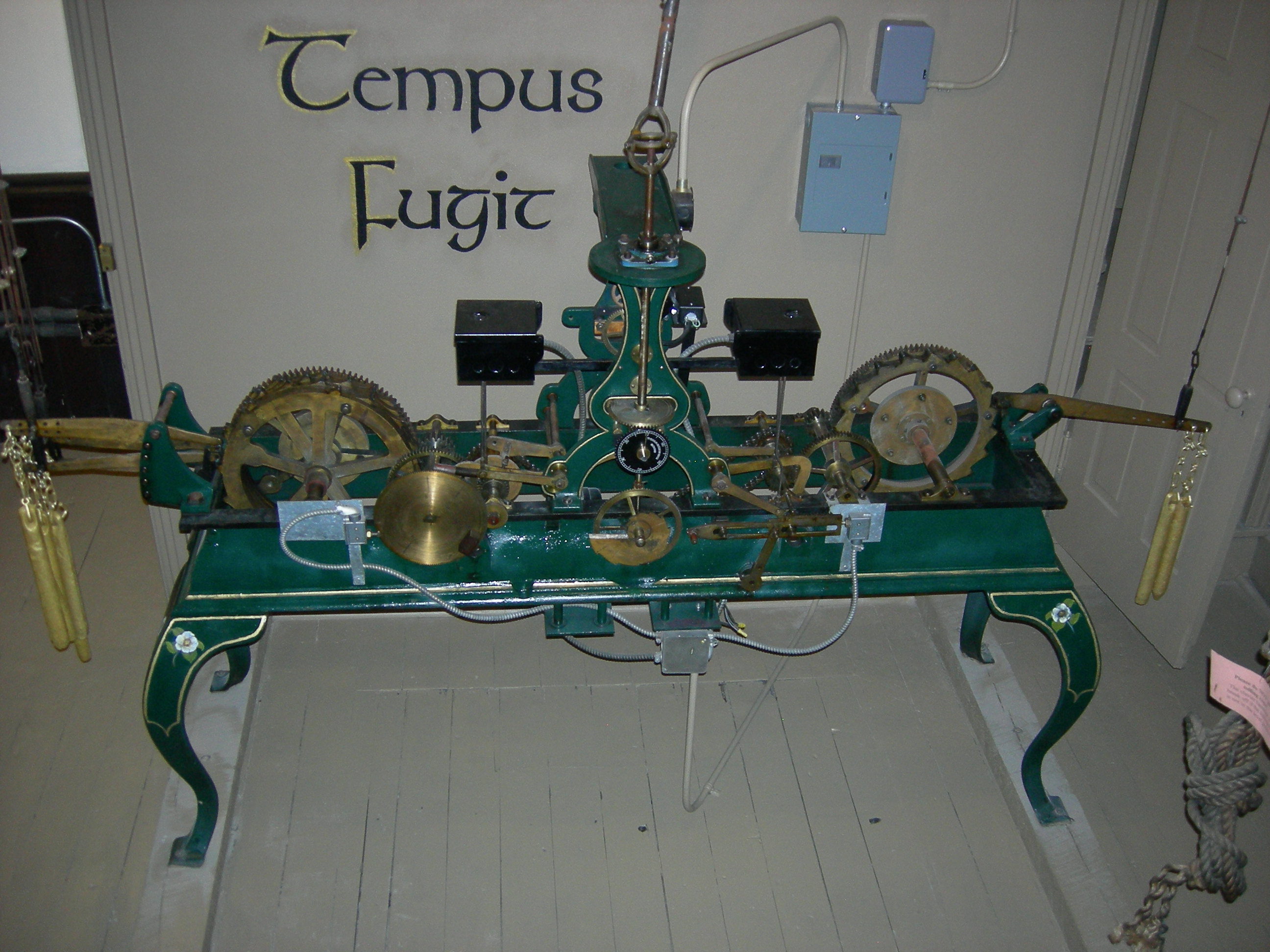
E. Howard Tower Clock #281

The chime clavier was first played on Christmas Eve, 1875. The 9-bell chime combined weight is 8,500 pounds, with the largest bell weighing 2,300 pounds.

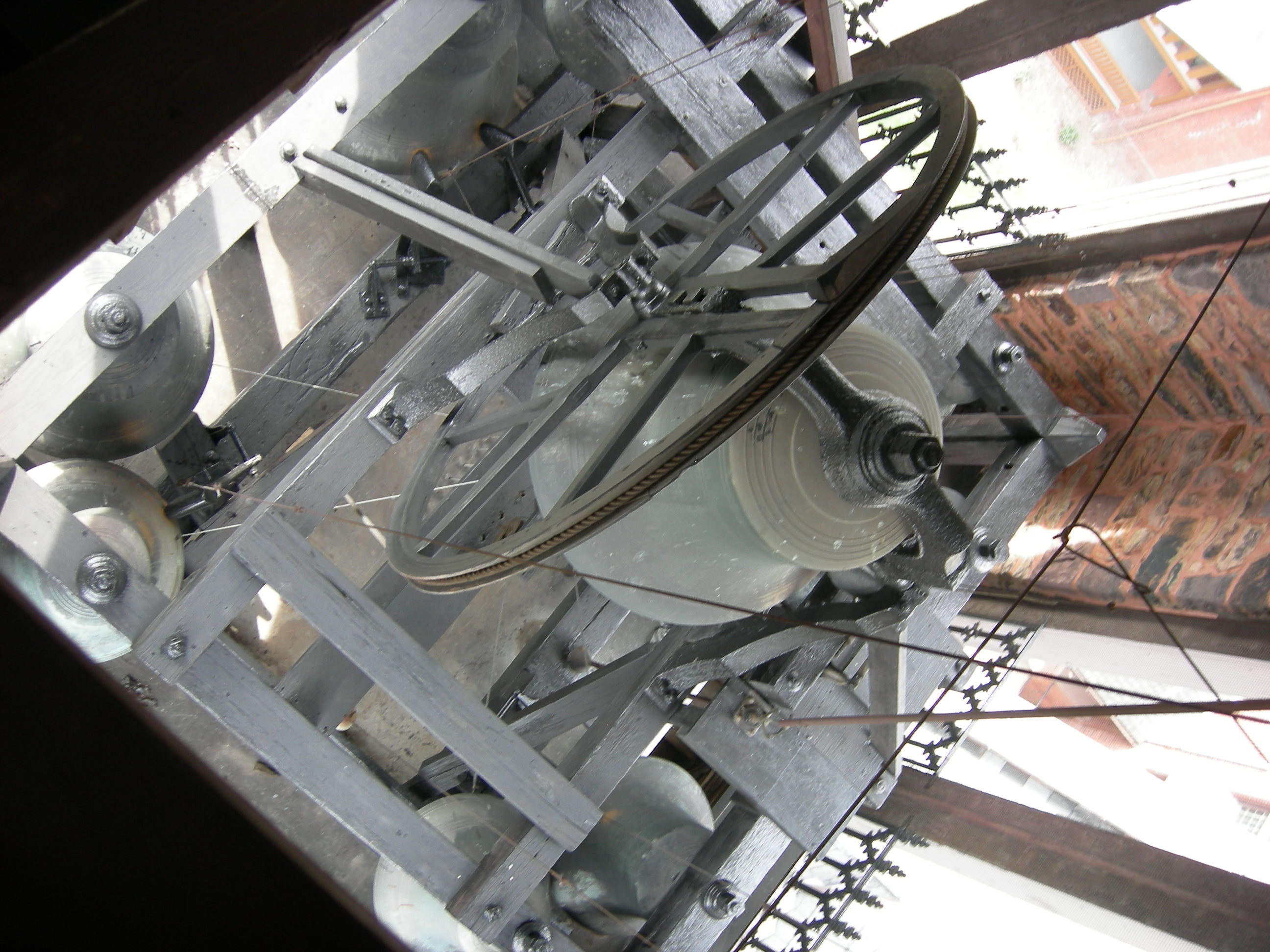
The Maynard Chime (Jones Bell Foundry, Troy, NY)

An excerpt from the Parish Dial, March, 1875: "The beautiful instrument, which it contains is from the manufactory of E. Howard & Co., Boston (Serial Number 281.) Several years ago Prof. Lyman, of the Sheffield Scientific School, Yale College, was requested by the city of New Haven to examine the various tower clocks made in this country, and to recommend the instrument which seemed to him the best time keeper. The result of this examination was the purchase of a Howard clock by the city of New Haven, which is now in the tower of the Town Hall and keeps accurate time. The clock in Trinity Church tower is similar to the New Haven instrument, and is warranted, after proper regulation, not to vary over two seconds a week. Extra machinery has been added to the Trinity clock by means of which it strikes the famous Cambridge Quarters, sometimes called the Westminster Quarters. The music for the first quarter consists of four notes, for the second quarter of eight, for the third of twelve, and for the fourth of sixteen. The notes played were arranged by William Crotch from an air of Handel's and were first applied to St. Mary's Cambridge, England in 1794. They are also struck by the clock in the tower of Westminster Palace, and by the Cathedral clock in Toronto, Canada. To Trinity Church belongs the credit of introducing them into the United States. Five of the bells of the Maynard Chime are used in playing these strains, the hour being struck on the great tenor bell."

In 1884, Judge Maynard donated land for the Rectory to be erected.

The Parish Hall and Chapel was constructed and dedicated on May 8, 1916 from a bequest made by Amanda Howard.

On Sunday, February 13, 1977, an arsonist set fire to a pile of hymnals and prayer books in the church chapel. This was the second church fire he had set that evening. The other fire was set at Pine Street United Methodist Church, which could not be saved from the destruction of flames. It was fortunate for Trinity that a neighbor smelled smoke and saw the flames flickering through the chapel windows. The fire department, responded quickly, and contained the damage to the chapel area. The heat from the fire was so intense that it melted the chapel organ pipes.

It was included in the Millionaire's Row Historic District in 1985.

A history of the church "Trinity Episcopal Church - An Historical Portrait" (LC Control No.: 9106682) was written in 1991 and updated and revised in 2010 by Douglas S. Gordon. The original published book is out-of-print but an electronic copy is available from the church office.

The restoration and repointing of the stonework was completed in 2000.

The baptistery mural, "The Angels Appearing to the Shepherds" (1929)(designed by John Wesley Little and completed by S.R. Hartman after Little's death) was restored by Michele W. Mapstone in 2009.

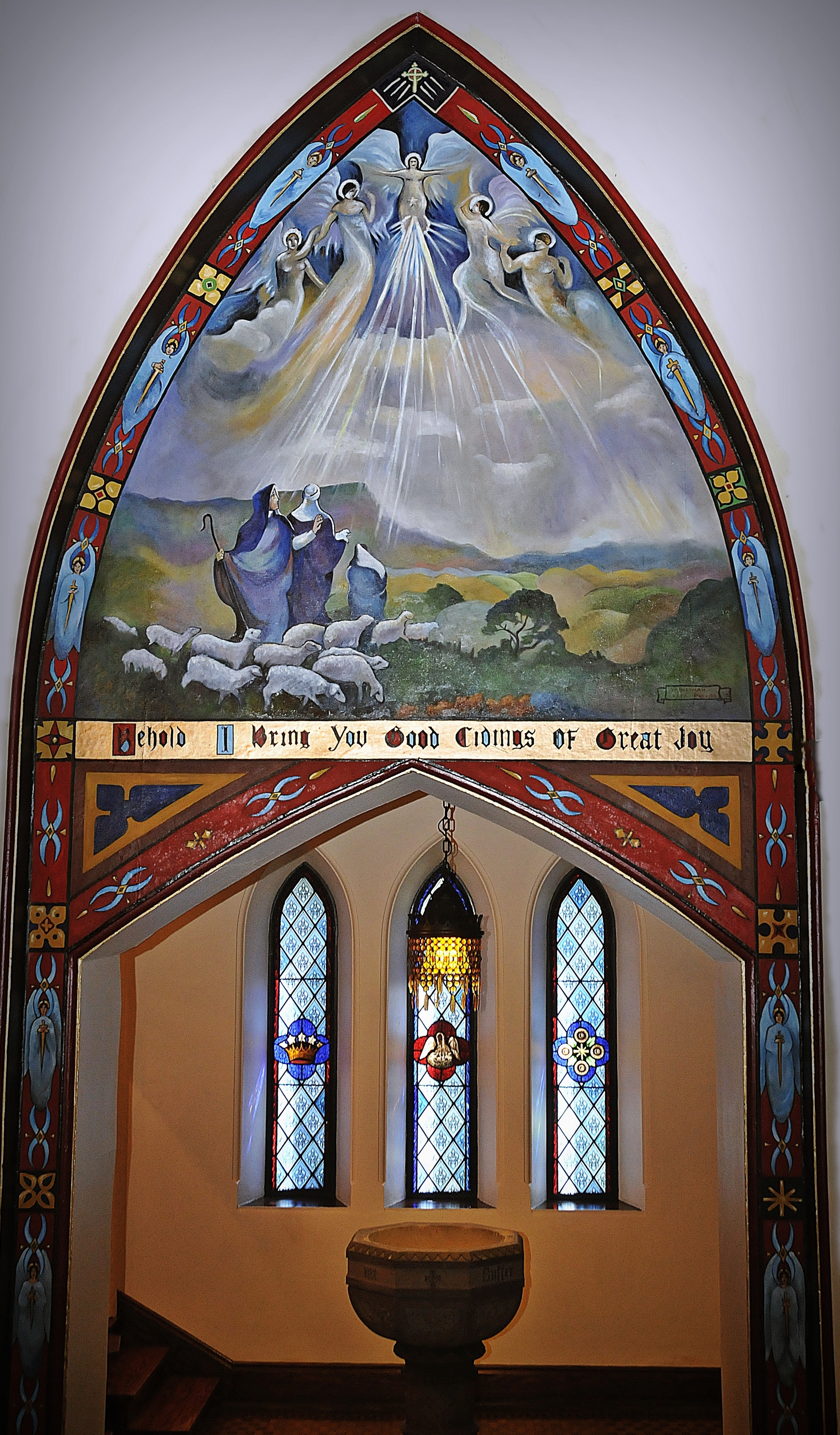
"The Angels Appearing to the Shepherds", J. Wesley Little

In 2010, The Pennsylvania College of Technology in cooperation with Mr. James Zerfing rebuilt portions of the clock and put it back in faithful service. Mr. Zerfing has been the caretaker of the clock since the 1970s.

== Music at Trinity ==
Music is a valued part of Trinity’s heritage. The organ in the main church was built and installed by Austin Organs, Incorporated. It contains 2,031 pipes constituting three manual divisions and pedals arranged in 35 ranks and 2 extensions.

== Sunday worship schedule ==
Worship services begin at 8:00 AM in the Chapel and 10:00 AM in the Main Church. The church is located at 844 West Fourth Street, Williamsport, PA 17701

== Community outreach ==
In addition to church services, it is home to Alcoholics Anonymous meetings, concerts and community events.
