= Peter Herdic House =

Historic house in Pennsylvania, United States

- U.S. National Register of Historic Places
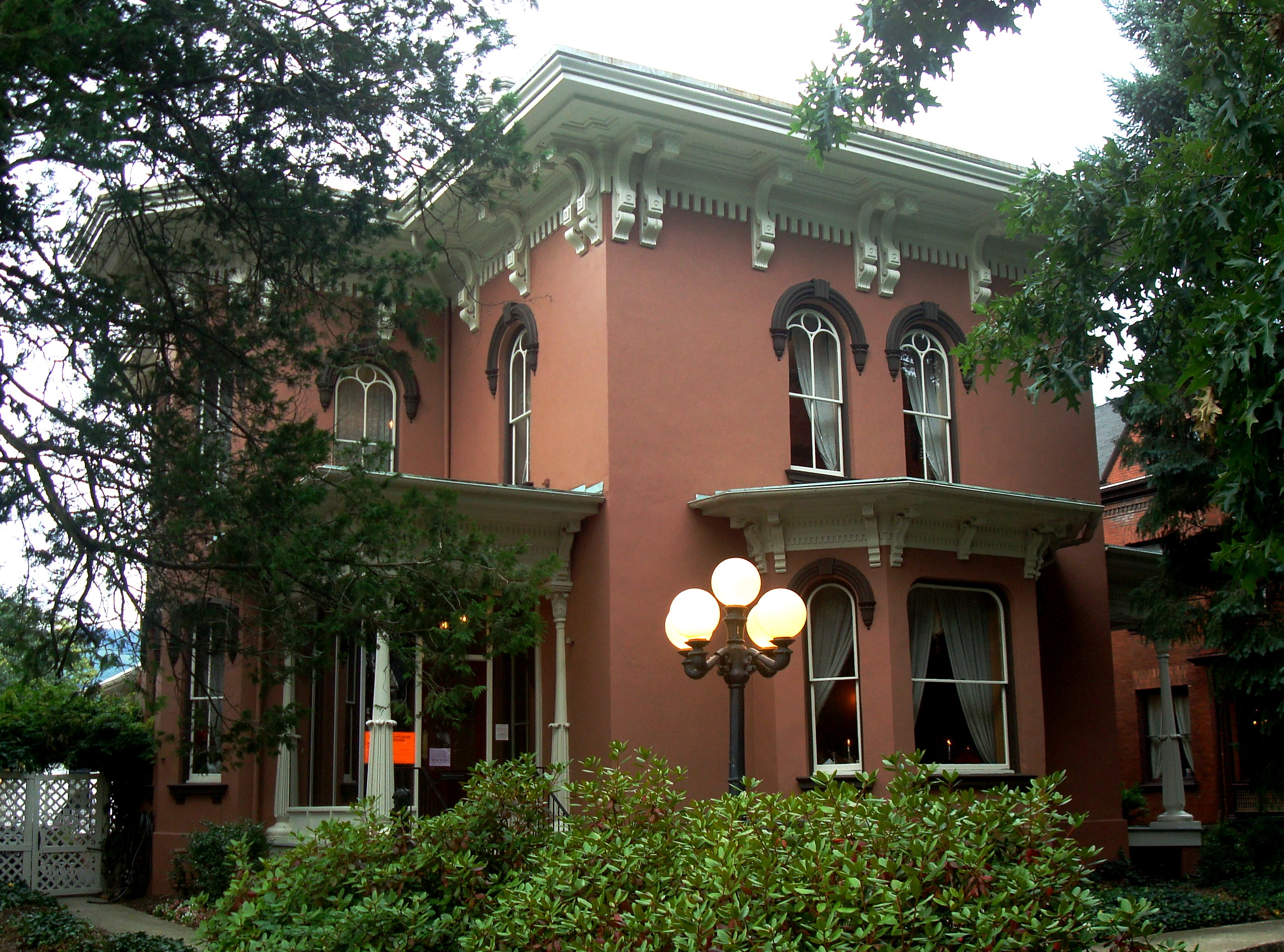
- (2014)

- Location within Pennsylvania Location within the United States
- Location: 407 West 4th Street between Elmira and Center Streets; Williamsport, Pennsylvania
- Coordinates: 41°14′23″N 77°0′33″W
- Built: 1855-1856
- Architect: Eber Culver
- Architectural style: Italian Villa
- NRHP reference No.: 78002429
- Added to NRHP: November 21, 1978

The Peter Herdic House is an historic home that is located at 407 West 4th Street between Elmira and Center Streets in the Millionaire's Row Historic District of Williamsport, Pennsylvania, United States.

The house was added to the National Register of Historic Places in 1978. The Millionaire's Row Historic District was listed in 1985.

== History ==
Built between 1855 and 1856, this historic structure was designed for Peter Herdic, a notable figure in the early development of Williamsport who served as the city's fourth mayor, beginning in the fall of 1869, and who later invented the Herdic, a horse-drawn carriage which became so popular that it was used to create systems of inexpensive mass transportation in multiple major metropolitan across the United States, including the Herdic Phaeton Company in Washington, D.C.

== Architectural features ==
The Peter Herdic House is a 2 1/2-story, brick building that was coated in stucco. Designed in the Italian Villa style, it features three bay windows on each floor and a distinctive cupola atop the roof.

== See also ==
- Herdic
- Herdic Phaeton Company
- National Register of Historic Places listings in Lycoming County, Pennsylvania
