= Susquehanna Boom =

The Susquehanna Boom was a system of cribs and chained logs in the West Branch Susquehanna River, designed to catch and hold floating timber until it could be processed at one of the nearly 60 sawmills along the river between Lycoming and Loyalsock Creeks in Lycoming County, Pennsylvania in the United States. The Susquehanna Boom was originally built under the supervision of James H. Perkins, and operated from 1851 to 1909, when it shut down for lack of timber.

== Function ==
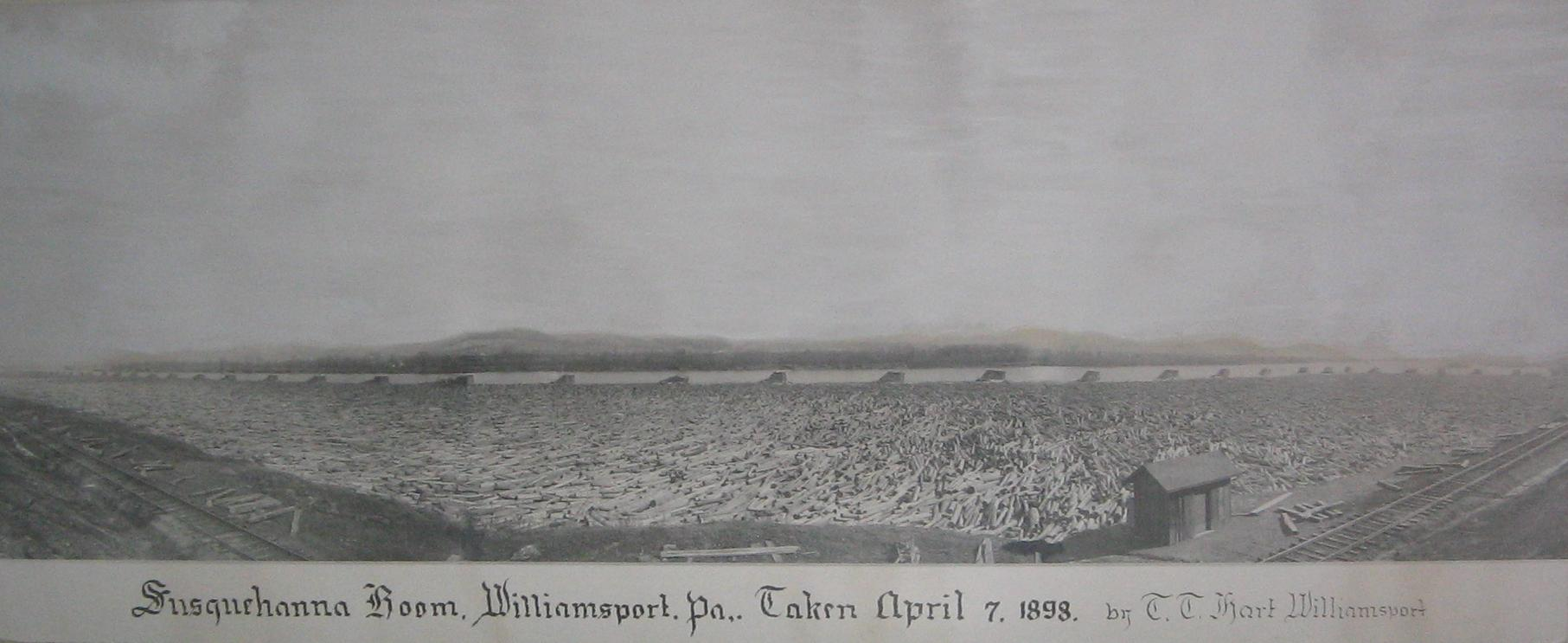
The Susquehanna Boom full of logs, 1898

A boom is "a barrier composed of a chain of floating logs enclosing other free-floating logs, typically used to catch floating debris or to obstruct passage". The Susquehanna Boom extended seven miles (11 km) upstream from Duboistown to the village of Linden in Woodward Township where it was interrupted to create a channel across the river for the passage of a ferry. It was extended further westward towards Jersey Shore. This extension was not always used, depending on the supply and demand for lumber. The boom was constructed by creating a series of man-made islands known as "cribs". These cribs built of local mountain stone and sunken timber were stretched diagonally across the river, beginning on the south side near Duboistown and ending on the north side near Linden. The boom was made of 352 separate cribs that were 22 feet (6.7 m) high. The boom was opened and closed at the upper end by a device known as a "sheer boom." It was 1,000 feet (300 m) long and was controlled with a hand-powered windlass. The sheer boom gathered the logs into the main boom that was capable of holding up to 300 million board feet (710,000 m^{3}) of logs. The lower end of the boom was where the logs were sorted. The mills in Williamsport, South Williamsport, and Duboistown each had their own distinctive brand burnt or cut into the logs. The men working at the end of the boom would sort the logs according to their corresponding brand and float them into the correct holding pond along the bank of the river. During the height of the lumber industry in Lycoming County, 1861–91, the various mills produced 5.5 billion board feet (13 million m^{3}) of lumber. Williamsport became one of the most prosperous cities in Pennsylvania and in the United States. Men like James H. Perkins, Peter Herdic, and Mahlon Fisher became millionaires while many of the men who actually worked in the river struggled to survive on the wages paid to them by the lumber barons.

== Beginnings ==
The first European settlers arrived in what became Lycoming County after the Province of Pennsylvania purchased the land from the Iroquois in the 1768 Treaty of Fort Stanwix. Small scale sawmills along tributaries of the West Branch Susquehanna River were built prior to the American Revolution, and provided enough lumber to build the houses and barns of Williamsport and the surrounding area. Even more timber was made into rafts and floated all the way down the Susquehanna River, into Chesapeake Bay and on to Baltimore, where the massive and straight timbers were turned into masts for the famous Baltimore Clippers and other sailing vessels of the 18th century.

In the 1830s, lumber booms were not used along the Susquehanna and West Branch Susquehanna rivers, but they were used extensively in the Maine lumber industry. According to Taber, the idea for a very large boom on the West Branch Susquehanna River originated with John Leighton, who had worked in Maine sawmills and visited the Williamsport area in 1836. The West Branch Susquehanna River drainage basin at Williamsport is 5,682 square miles (14,716 km^{2}), and is drained by many fairly large tributaries such as Sinnemahoning Creek and its branches, Kettle Creek, Pine Creek, and Lycoming Creek. In the 19th century these streams and their tributaries reached far into the Allegheny Plateau and provided easy access to the millions of trees that covered much of Pennsylvania then. Leighton saw that the stretch of the West Branch near Williamsport was fairly slow moving, broad, deep and calm. This stretch of river, known as the "Long Reach", proved to be the ideal setting for the construction of the Susquehanna Boom. However, the properties of the river that made it ideal for a very large boom also made it a poor location for operating water-powered sawmills. Only one such sawmill, the "Big Water Mill", operated in Williamsport prior to the establishment of the boom, and it went bankrupt at least twice.

The next several years saw two developments that made the Susquehanna boom and the sawmills associated with it feasible. The first was the development of reliable means of transportation, with the completion of the West Susquehanna Branch of the Pennsylvania Canal to Williamsport in 1834 and opening of the first railroad in 1839. These allowed finished wood products to be taken to markets year-round, instead of just floating logs and rafts down the river during Spring and high water. The second was the gradual development and acceptance of steam engines to power sawmills, allowing large mills to operate without water-power.

The arrival of James H. Perkins, a native of New Hampshire, in December 1845 was the beginning of the economic boom that would make Williamsport into a booming lumber city. Perkins had been a successful owner of a calico prints factory in Philadelphia prior to selling out and moving to the West Branch Susquehanna River Valley. Perkins and his business partner, John Leighton, set out with the goal of creating a large scale lumbering and milling operation. Perkins believed that Williamsport could be a major center in the lumber business, as it was surrounded by a plentiful supply of old-growth forests of hemlock, white pine and various hardwoods.

The Susquehanna Boom Company was incorporated on March 26, 1846. There were initially 100 shares of stock issued at $100 per share. The first shareholders were John Dubois (founder of Duboistown and later Dubois, Pennsylvania) and his brother Matthias DuBois, each with 25 shares, Perkins had 24 shares, Isaac Smith had 20 shares, Elias S. Lowe (a partner of the DuBois brothers) had five shares, and Leighton had one share, perhaps as payment for services. John DuBois was elected President of the Boom and served in that capacity until 1857.

The stockholders meeting held on November 5, 1849, saw the election of John Leighton to the chair and Elias S. Lowe was chosen as the secretary. Construction of the boom began in 1849 with the erection of two temporary booms. Periodic flooding along the West Branch slowed construction of the boom until it was ultimately completed in 1851. When filled to capacity the 450 acres (1.8 km^{2}) of enclosed river could hold nearly one million logs.

== Operation ==
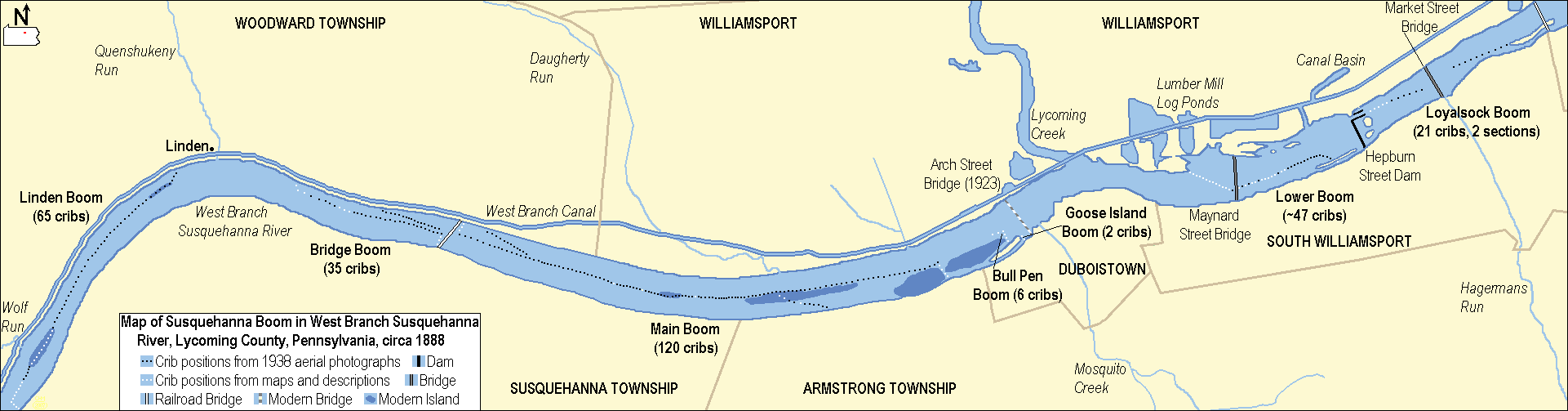
Map of the Susquehanna Boom on the West Branch Susquehanna River, in Lycoming County, Pennsylvania in the USA, between its completion in 1873 and partial destruction in 1889.

The Susquehanna Boom was placed in an area of the river that had a large bend that drew the logs to the south side of the river. It worked as a type of corral, a corral for logs. Operating and managing the boom was a labor-intensive endeavour. 150 men and boys were needed to sort and separate the millions of logs that floated into the Susquehanna Boom. Boys as young as 12 worked among the cribs. They had to identify one of over 1,700 marks found on the logs and send them along in a raft to the proper sawmill. Sorting these logs was the first job a boy could get on the Susquehanna Boom. The "Boom Rats" walked along long planks known as "stretchers" that connected the 352 cribs. They used long handled hooks to gather the logs to be tied into rafts. This was a job that required strength and agility and was the domain of young men.

The boom had to be lifted from the river at the outset of every winter before the river would freeze. This job was carried out by a group of men that worked with a tugboat. The power of the tub lifted the boom out of the water for storing on the safety of the banks of the river. Then each spring before the run of the logs down the river the boom had to be put back into place.

The boom operated for eight months. The 150 employees were paid $1.50 per day for their work. The owners of the boom paid an average of $50,000 per year to their employees for an average of $333.33 per man. This low pay compared to the millions that the owners of the boom and some of the mills brought about some hard feelings among the workers of the Susquehanna Boom. The workers of the boom, the lumber jacks, and the sawmill workers banded together in 1872 went on strike that summer.

== Sawdust War ==
The strike began on July 1 and culminated with the riot known as the "Sawdust War" broke out on July 20. Nearly 3,000 men felt like they had not received a fair share of the profits. Over 5 million dollars' worth of lumber had been processed the previous summer. Men like Peter Herdic, James Perkins and Mahlon Fisher had become millionaires while they struggled to feed their families with the wages earned at the dangerous jobs. In addition to the disparity in income the workers were also being forced to work twelve-hour days when the Pennsylvania General Assembly had recently passed a law requiring ten-hour workdays. Despite the new law the state government had no way to enforce the new rules and the owners of the lumber mills and the boom chose to ignore the law. The leaders of the lumbermen decided that going on strike would be the only way to receive the hours and pay that they felt they deserved. Their motto was, "Ten hours or no sawdust."

On the morning of July 1, 1872 the leaders of strike assembled in front of the Lycoming County Courthouse. They then marched to each sawmill and gathered the mill workers and/or shutdown the machinery of the mill. The strike on July 1 was relatively peaceful. The leaders of the strike became worried that the lumbermen would return to work without gaining the new working hours and higher pay that they sought. Many of the mill workers expressed worry that they would be unable to feed their families if they did not earn their wages by working. The leaders of the strike assembled once again on July 22 and they descended on the mills once again. This time they were met by a police force that was ordered to prevent the mills from being closed down. The strikers attempted to force their way past the police force. They threw stones at the police and the mill and the riot began. Many of the strikers armed themselves with clubs and revolvers. They chased away mill workers and tried to chase away the police.

The Pennsylvania Militia was called in to protect the interests of the sawmill owners. And the strikers fled the scene. Twenty-seven men were arrested for their role in the riot and 21 convicted by the local court for their roles in the riot on September 14, 1872. Twenty-one days later all of them were pardoned by Pennsylvania Governor John W. Geary as a political favor to Peter Herdic, the owner of the Susquehanna Boom.

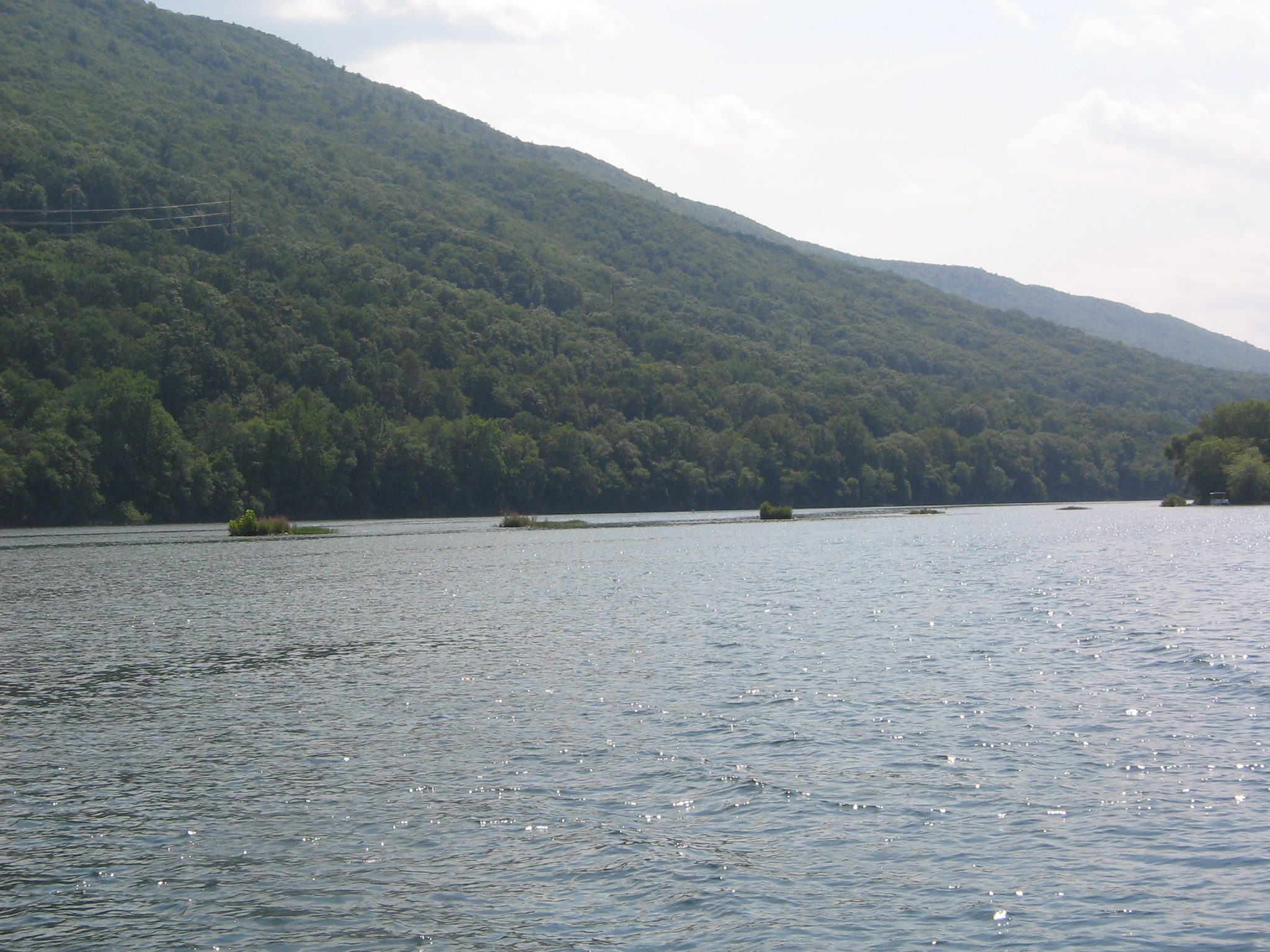
Islands left from the boom cribs in the West Branch Susquehanna River are all that is left of the Susquehanna Boom today

== End of the Boom ==
The Susquehanna Boom lost its profitability for three main reasons. First was the periodic floods that swept down the West Branch Valley following the winter snow melt and the spring rains. The West Branch Valley was devastated by a flood in 1894. The sawmills along the river were largely destroyed. The boom was washed away and close to two million board feet (4,700 m^{3}) of freshly cut timber were washed down the Susquehanna River. Second were the newly constructed railroads in North Central Pennsylvania. These railroads were able to transport the fresh timber more quickly and were less risky, expensive and dangerous than floating the logs down the West Branch Susquehanna River and its tributaries. Thirdly, little thought for the future was placed when the massive stands of old growth forest were harvested during the 19th century. The mountains were clear cut. The tops of the trees were left to dry. The passing steam trains spread burning embers along the railroad tracks. These embers would spark devastating fires that prevented the forests from regrowing. Without trees the sawmills could no longer process timber, the mills closed and eventually the boom itself was forced to close in 1908.

== See also ==
- History of logging in Pennsylvania
