= Millionaire's Row Historic District =

Historic district in Pennsylvania, United States

- U.S. National Register of Historic Places
- U.S. Historic district
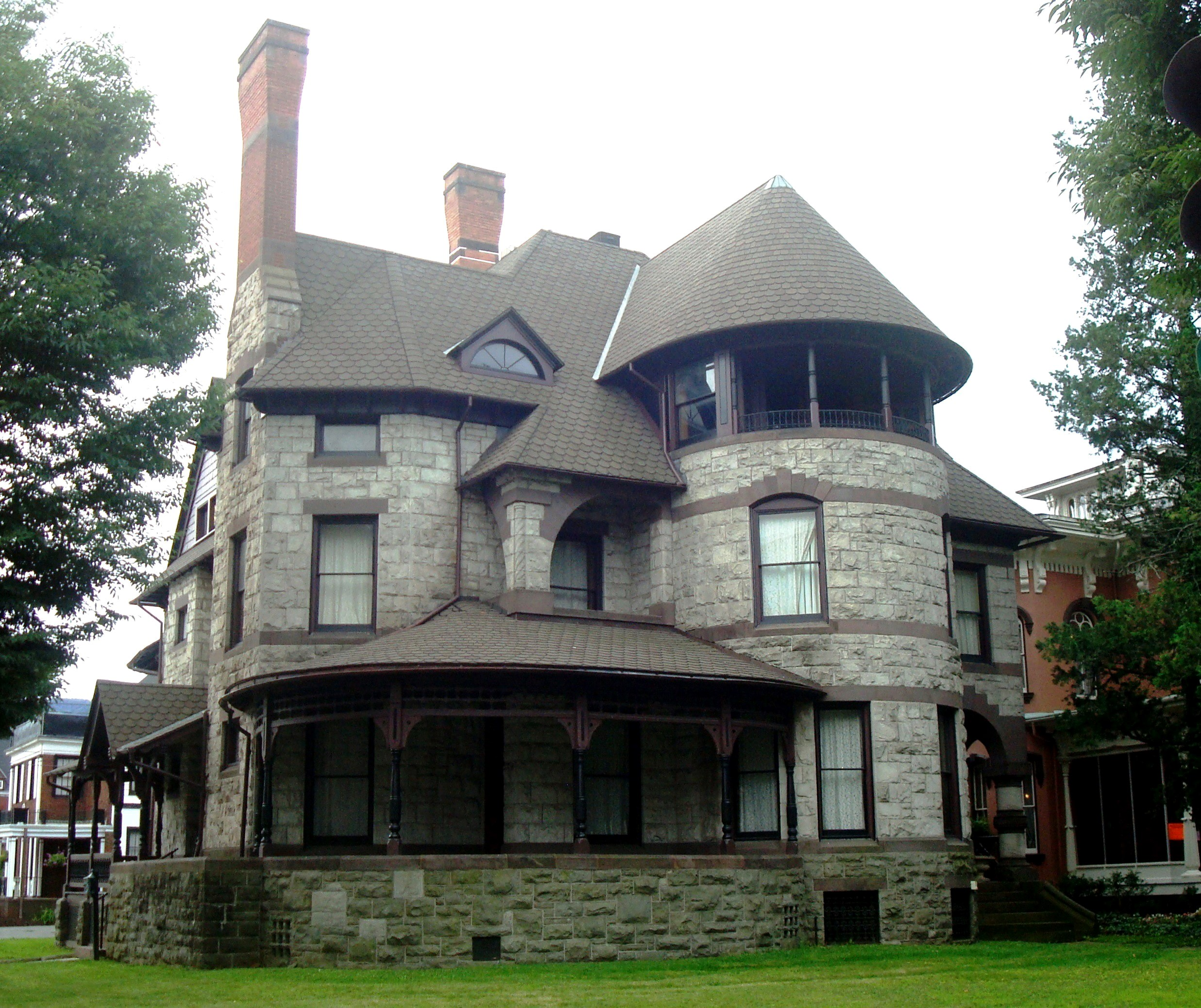
- Hermance House (2014)

- Location within Pennsylvania Location within the United States
- Location: Roughly bounded by Nichols Place, Elmira and West 3rd Streets, and 7th Avenue; Williamsport, Pennsylvania
- Coordinates: 41°14′20″N 77°0′59″W
- Area: 100 acres (40 ha)
- Built: c.1855
- Architect: Eber Culver, et al.
- Architectural style: Late Victorian
- NRHP reference No.: 85000120
- Added to NRHP: January 24, 1985

The Millionaire's Row Historic District is a national historic district that is located in Williamsport, Pennsylvania.

It was added to the National Register of Historic Places in 1985.

== History and architectural features ==
This district includes 263 contributing buildings and one contributing site that are located in a residential area of Williamsport. The buildings date back to as early as 1855, and are representative of Victorian-style architecture. Notable non-residential buildings include the Trinity Church and Parish House, First Church of Christ-Scientist, Weightman Block, Park Home, and the Covenant Central Presbyterian Church. Way's Garden is the contributing site; it was established in 1913. Located in the district but separately listed is the Peter Herdic House.

== See also ==
- National Register of Historic Places listings in Lycoming County, Pennsylvania
