= Great Indian Warpath =

Trails in eastern North America used by Native Americans

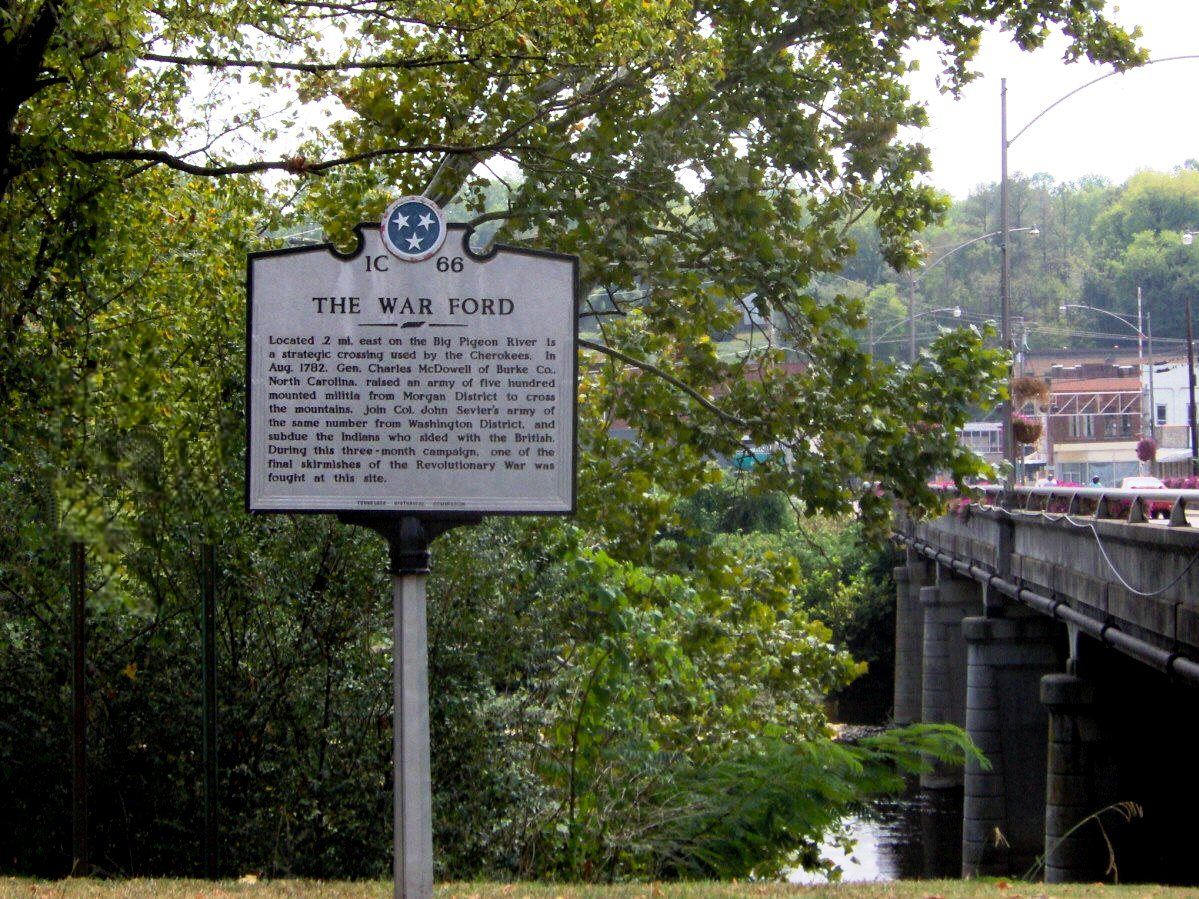
Tennessee Historical Commission marker at the north end of McSween Memorial Bridge (US-321) in Newport, Tennessee. The sign recalls the location of War Ford, 0.2 miles to the east along the Pigeon River. The ford was an important crossing along the Great Indian Warpath.

The Great Indian Warpath (GIW)—also known as the Great Indian War and Trading Path, or the Seneca Trail—was part of the network of trails in eastern North America developed and used by Native Americans which ran through the Great Appalachian Valley. The system of footpaths (the Warpath branched off in several places onto alternate routes and over time shifted westward in some regions) extended from what is now upper New York to deep within Alabama. Various Native peoples traded and made war along the trails, including the Catawba, numerous Algonquian tribes, the Cherokee, and the Haudenosaunee Confederacy. The British traders' name for the route was derived from combining its name among the northeastern Algonquian tribes, Mishimayagat or "Great Trail", with that of the Shawnee and Lenape, Athawominee or "Path where they go armed".

== History ==
The age of the Great Indian Warpath is unknown. Many of the trails were first broken by animals traveling to the salt licks in the region, especially by the herds of buffalo in the Valley of Virginia. These animal trails were later used by Native Americans. The trails were used for commerce, trading and communication between tribes before the land was explored by Europeans. In Virginia during November 1728, William Byrd II commented while passing a branch of the Indian trail what would later be called the Great Wagon Road in what would eventually be Henry County, Virginia, that "The Indians, who have no way of traveling except on the Hoof, make nothing of going 25 miles a day, and carrying their little Necessities at their backs, and Sometimes a Stout Pack of Skins into the bargain."

While archaeology shows that the Valley of Virginia was inhabited before the arrival of the Europeans, by the 18th century most of the region was abandoned. Only smaller villages and settlements of different tribes occupied the valley, which was used as a hunting ground, a travel route, and a warpath between the two great clusters of Eastern Indians in the 17th and 18th centuries.

=== European colonizers ===
In the north, the line of the Seneca Trail formed the boundary of "the frontier" by the time of the French and Indian War (1756–63). When King George III issued a proclamation in 1763 forbidding further settlement beyond the mountains and demanding the return of settlers who had already crossed the Alleghenies, a line was designated roughly following the Seneca Trail.

== Route ==
=== Alabama ===
In the south, the GIW began at the Gulf of Mexico in the Mobile area and proceeded north by northeast, bisecting another trail known as the Upper Creek Path and crossing the Tennessee River near Guntersville. It then followed roughly the same route as the Tennessee upriver until reaching the vicinity of the modern Bridgeport. There it crossed the Tennessee once again at the Great Creek Crossing just below the foot of Long Island on the Tennessee, intersecting another path, the Cisca and St. Augustine Trail, which ran from the area of St. Augustine, Florida to that of Nashville, Tennessee.

=== Tennessee ===
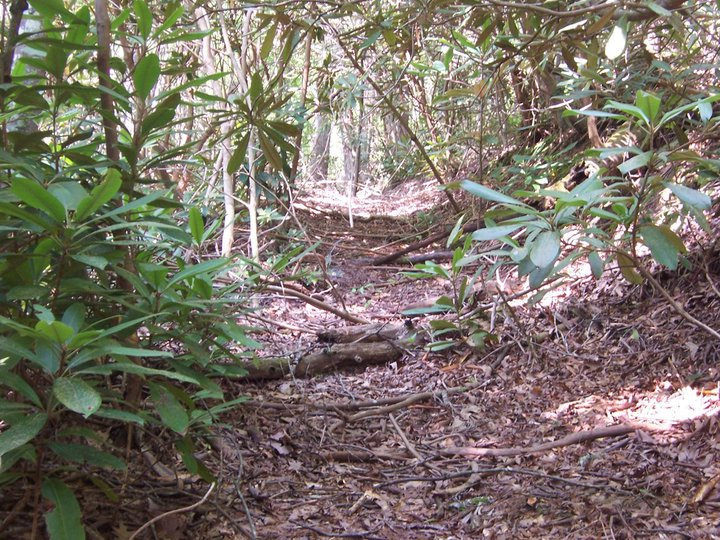
A preserved section of the Unicoi Turnpike Trail near Conasauga Creek in the Cherokee National Forest

Several miles upriver from Long Island, the GIW passed through the Nickajack area, so-called by the Cherokee (from Ani-Kusati) because it had once been inhabited by the Koasati.

After following the south bank of the Tennessee River, the path proceeded through Running Water Valley to Lookout/Will's Valley, where it met the Cumberland Trail. From present-day Gadsden, Alabama, this trail passed through the latter valley at a point along the Upper Creek Path, on its way to the Cumberland Gap, the Ohio Valley, and the Great Lakes region. Having met, both trails crossed the foot of Lookout Mountain; their route was later followed by the improved Old Wauhatchie Pike.

Once over the mountain, the path crossed lower Chattanooga Valley to what archaeologists refer to as the Citico site. For several hundred years this was the pre-eminent town in the early period of the Mississippian culture in East Tennessee (until around 1200). Past Citico, the path ran east (later followed by the late Shallowford Road) to Missionary Ridge, where it divided. The main branch headed northeast toward the Shallow Ford (which can still be seen) across the Chickamauga River (South Chickamauga Creek) and the other branch went directly east (a route now followed by Bird's Mill/Brainerd Road) to cross at another ford at the site of the later Brainerd Mission and Bird's Mill.

The east bank of that site is where Dragging Canoe and his Chickamauga Cherokee faction established their base after leaving the Overhill Cherokee towns on the Little Tennessee River. From there, it proceeded north along the modern-day Chickamauga Road until reaching the main route again. Its path was later followed by the improved Chattanooga-Cleveland Pike. From the area of present-day Cleveland, Tennessee, the path has been followed by Lee Highway until reaching the Little Tennessee River.

From Old Chickamauga Town, a third branch of the path passed across Hickory Valley, where it intersected a path from the Cisca and St. Augustine Trail in North Georgia to the Tennessee River. This intersected the main route of the path before fording the stream at Harrison, Tennessee, to reach the Middle Mississippian town which archaeologists call the Dallas site. After crossing that valley, the branch from Chickamauga passed east to Parker's Gap through Whiteoak Mountain and turned northeast, eventually rejoining the main route.

In the Overhill Cherokee country, the path ran from the north to the town of Chota on the Little Tennessee. Here, another important trail, the Warriors' Path, continued south to the town of Great Tellico (present-day Tellico Plains), following Ball Play Creek and the Tellico River. At Great Tellico, the Warrior's Path intersected the Trading Path (later called the "Unicoi Turnpike"), which ran east over the mountains. From Great Tellico, the Warrior's Path followed Conasauga Creek to its confluence with the Hiwassee River, where the town of Great Hiwassee stood.

=== Virginia ===
In Virginia, U.S. Route 11 (parallel to Interstate 81) was built along the GIW route. From the Cumberland Gap and Appalachian mountains at the Tennessee border, the fork called the Chesapeake Branch led northeast, passing 3 miles (5 km) west of what is now Bristol, then through the sites of present-day Abingdon, Glade Spring, Marion, Rural Retreat, Fort Chiswell (another possible westward gap route), Draper, Ingle's or Pepper's ferry, Salem, Roanoke and Amsterdam, then up the Shenandoah Valley through Buchanan, Lexington, Staunton, Harrisonburg, Winchester. From Winchester, most GIW routes briefly enter West Virginia, then continue northward into Maryland and Pennsylvania.

Various forks led up (or down) rivers from Chesapeake Bay through the coastal plain and Piedmont. One Chesapeake branch cut off at present Ellett, Virginia, went up the North Fork of the Roanoke River, down Catawba Creek to Fincastle or Amsterdam. The Richmond fork of the Chesapeake branch led off from Salem, and continued southwest of Lynchburg, and thence northeast to the future site of Richmond.

Another branch turned south from Big Lick, near present-day Roanoke, and turned south toward the Catawba country in South Carolina. Later this trading path would be called part of the Great Wagon Road or the Carolina Road. William Byrd II mentioned it during his survey of the dividing line between North Carolina and Virginia in November 1728. "The Trading Path above mentioned receives its name from being the Route the Traders take with their caravans, when they go to traffick with the Catawbas and other Southern Indians... The Course from Roanoke to the Catawbas is laid down nearest Southwest, and lies through a fine country, that is watered by Several beautiful Rivers.

The Ohio branch led up the Holston Valley to the north fork of the Holston River by what is now Saltville, Virginia, to the New River, and thence down the New and Kanawha rivers to Indian settlements in Ohio and western Pennsylvania.

=== West Virginia ===
Most GIW branches cross West Virginia, although one more eastern route skips the state entirely, following U.S. Route 15 from Winchester to Frederick, Maryland. The Winchester Pike (now U.S. 11) passes through Berkeley County, West Virginia (including Martinsburg) before crossing the Potomac River near Hagerstown, Maryland.

Another more western Seneca Trail branch crossed West Virginia along routes that became U.S. Route 19, I-79 and U.S. Route 219. Entering a few miles west of Bluefield, what became Route 19 winds through the mountains until Beckley, then continues to Sutton and Morgantown before entering Pennsylvania and continuing to the Great Lakes at Erie via I-79.

Route 219 follows the Bluestone River to the New and Greenbrier rivers to the vicinity of White Sulphur Springs. It then follows Anthony Creek down to the Greenbrier River near the present Pocahontas – Greenbrier County line, then ascending toward Hillsboro and Droop Mountain. It crossed through present Pocahontas County by way of Marlinton, Indian Draft Run, and Edray. Passing into present Randolph County, it descended the Tygart Valley River from its headwaters and passed through the vicinity of present-day Elkins, after which it proceeded north by ascending Leading Creek. It left Randolph County after crossing Pheasant Mountain, and descended the Left Fork of Clover Run into present-day Tucker County. Crossing the Shavers Fork of the Cheat River, it exited Tucker county and West Virginia by way of Horseshoe Run northeast of St. George, crossing the Potomac River near Oakland, Maryland.

=== Maryland ===
From crossing the Potomac River at Hagerstown, Maryland, the Seneca Trail (U.S. Route 11) continued northward toward the Cumberland Valley and modern Chambersburg, Pennsylvania.

Since the terrain in Virginia and West Virginia was the most difficult to cross east to west (or vice versa), along the Appalachian mountain range, due to numerous north–south ridges, most hunters (and later settlers) crossed the mountains between the Ohio River watershed and Chesapeake Bay watershed either in Tennessee to the south of that region, or via what was once called Nemacolin's Trail through the Cumberland Narrows of Maryland and western Pennsylvania. Named after the Delaware chief Nemacolin, who assisted surveyor Thomas Cresap on behalf of the Ohio Company of Virginia, it was further improved by Washington and General Braddock. This route connected Cumberland, Maryland by way of the Youghiogheny and Allegheny rivers with Brownsville, Pennsylvania on the Ohio River. As the 19th century began, this east–west route became known as the Cumberland or National Road, later (U.S. Route 40).

Another major Indian route crossed the Potomac nearer what became Washington, D.C., and the falls of the Potomac River, crossing in the Sugarland/Seneca valley area of what became Montgomery County, Maryland (where historic Edward's Ferry operated and White's Ferry still operates), then continued to Rockville, Maryland. As European settlement progressed, this route also moved somewhat to the west, so the major crossing became at Point of Rocks, Maryland or Brunswick, Maryland, then continued to Frederick, Maryland. This route did not cross the Alleghenies, instead following their foothills, especially along Monocacy River, roughly along the old alignment of U.S. Route 15 (the Catoctin Highway, now Maryland Route 28 and Maryland Route 85). One branch continued west toward the Ohio River valley through Emmitsburg, Maryland and could ultimately connect to Nemacolin's trail further north, even along what became U.S. Route 30 in Gettysburg, Pennsylvania. Another GIW branch continued east along the Potomac River toward Washington, D.C., and Alexandria, Virginia (then settlements of the Piscataway tribe) following what became the Chesapeake and Ohio Canal.

Yet another hunting, fighting and trading route from Frederick continued eastward from the GIW to Baltimore, where a connector path closely followed the present-day route of Maryland Route 10, the Arundel Expressway. It continued south of Maryland Route 2 towards Annapolis near the once-planned extension of MD 10. War parties could then invade the Delmarva Peninsula, and the lands of the Algonkian speaking Lenape of the Delaware River Valley and/or the Piscataway and Powhatan Confederacy of the Chesapeake Bay.

=== Pennsylvania ===
The Great Indian Warpath continued its south–north route through Pennsylvania toward New York along three major paths, pushed westward by development. The easternmost route followed the Appalachian foothills in what became U.S. Route 15 (from the Potomac River at Point of Rocks through Frederick, Maryland and Gettysburg to the Susquehanna River at Camp Hill, Pennsylvania).

Another route followed Pennsylvania's Cumberland Valley via U.S. Routes 11 and 81 (from the Potomac River at Hagerstown, Maryland through Chambersburg, Shippensburg and Carlisle, Pennsylvania). Both these war and hunting routes joined to cross the Susquehanna River near Camp Hill (now a suburb of Harrisburg) and jointly followed its tributaries further northward until again splitting near what became the Shamokin Dam and later Shikellamy State Park (then a major Indian village near Sunbury). One branch followed the West Branch Susquehanna River westward along one bank via the Great Shamokin Path to the Allegheny River or northward along the other bank via the Great Island Path to Lock Haven, Pennsylvania and another major village at the confluence of five major trails. Another branch continued north and eastward along the main branch of the Susquehanna into the Wyoming Valley. The Sheshequin Path connected the branches and continued to follow the Appalachians into New York.

The westernmost GIW routes actually crossed the Alleghanies. That which became (Interstate 79) crossed into the Great Lakes watershed at Erie, Pennsylvania. This or the Great Shamokin Path may have become the most used after the French and Indian War as settlement, the Kittanning Expedition of 1756 and the Wyoming Valley massacre of 1778 as well as disease pushed the remaining Algonquian-speaking peoples westward.

The northernmost major east–west branch in Pennsylvania connecting to the GIW became the track of the Delaware, Lackawanna and Western Railroad; a part has recently been converted back to pedestrian use as the Susquehanna Warrior Trail in Luzerne County.

The easiest and most traveled east–west route of the pre- and colonial era became the Philadelphia and Lancaster Turnpike (first used in 1795), which even later became the Main Line of the Pennsylvania Railroad and U.S. Route 30, which meets Route 15 at Gettysburg and Route 11 at Chambersburg.

James Veech described the Catawba Trail in The Monongahela of Old:

The most prominent, and perhaps the most ancient of these old pathways across our county, was the old Catawba or Cherokee Trail, leading from the Carolinas, Georgia, Florida, &c., through Virginia and Western Pennsylvania, on to Western New York and Canada. We will trace it within our limits as well as we can. After crossing and uniting with numerous other trails, the principal one entered Fayette territory, at the State line, at the mouth of Grassy run. A tributary trail, called the Warrior Branch, coming from Tennessee, through Kentucky and Southern Ohio, came up Fish creek and down Dunkard, crossing Cheat river at McFarland's. It run out a junction with the chief trail, intersecting it in William Gans' sugar camp, but it kept on by Crow's mill, James Robinson's, and the old gun factory, and thence toward the mouth of Redstone, intersecting the old Redstone trail from the top of Laurel Hill, afterward Burd's road, near Jackson's, or Grace Church, on the National Road. The main Catawba trail pursued the even tenor of its way, regardless of minor points, which, like a modern grand railroad, it served by branches and turn-outs. After receiving the Warrior Branch junction, it kept on through land late of Charles Griffin, by Long's Mill, Ashcraft's Fort, Phillip Rogers' (now Alfred Stewart's), the Diamond Spring (now William James'); thence nearly on the route of the present Morgantown road, until it came to the Misses Hadden's; thence across Hellen's fields, passing near the Rev. William Brownfield's mansion, and about five rods west of the old Henry Beeson brick house; thence through Uniontown, over the old Bank house lot, crossing the creek where the bridge now is, back of the Sheriff's house; thence along the northern side of the public grave-yard on the hill, through the eastern edge of John Gallagher's land, about six rods south of John F. Foster's (formerly Samuel Clarke's) house, it crossed Shute's Run where the fording now is, between the two meadows, keeping the high land through Col. Evans' plantation, and passed between William and John Jones' to the site of Pearse's Fort; thence by the Murphy school-house, and bearing about thirty rods westward of the Mount Braddock mansion, it passed a few rods to the east of the old Conrad Strickler house, where it is still visible. Keeping on through land formerly of John Hamilton (now Freeman), it crossed the old Connellsville road immediately on the summit of the Limestone hill, a few rods west of the old Strickler distillery; thence through the old Lawrence Harrison land (James Blackiston's) to Robinson's falls on Mill Run, and thence down it to the Yough river, crossing it just below the run's mouth, where Braddock's army crossed, at Stewart's Crossings. The trail thence kept through the Narrows, by Rist's, near the Baptist meeting-house, beyond Pennsville, passing by the old Saltwell on Green Lick run, to the mouth of Bushy run, at Tinsman's or Welshouse's mill. Thence it bore across Westmoreland county, up the Allegheny, to the heads of the Susquehanna, and into Western New York, then the country of the Haudenosaunee. A branch left the main trail at Robinson's mill, on Mill or Opossum run, which crossed the Yough at the Broad ford, bearing down across Jacobs creek, Sewickley and Turtle creeks, to the forks of the Ohio, at Pittsburgh, by the highland route. This branch, and the northern part within our county [Fayette], of the main route, will be found to possess much interest in connection with Braddock's line of march to his disastrous destiny.

This Cherokee or Catawba Indian trail, including its Warrior branch, is the only one of note which traversed our county northward and southward. Generally, they passed eastward and westward, from the river, to and across the mountains.

=== New York ===
The trails northward from Virginia and Pennsylvania converged at the junction of the Susquehanna River and the Chemung River; these led to where the Seneca Trail started/ended in western New York near present-day Niagara Falls, used for centuries by the Seneca of the Haudenosaunee and previous peoples around the Great Lakes. In 1775 the twelve united colonies entered into an agreement concerning the use of Native American paths and the roads:

Brothers: It is necessary, in order for the preservation of friendship between us and brothers of the Six Nations (Haudenosaunee or Iroquois) and their allies, that a free and mutual intercourse be kept between us; therefore we, Brothers: The road is now open for our brethren of the Six Nations and their allies, and they may now pass as safely and freely as the people of the Twelve United Colonies themselves. And we are further determined, by the assistance of God, to keep open and free for the Six Nations and their allies, as long as the earth remains.

The Haudenosaunee Confederacy's central trail had its western terminus at the site of present-day Buffalo on Buffalo Creek. It crossed to the Onondaga Valley at the foot of Seneca and Cayuga Lakes, met the Mohawk River at the "great carrying place" (the site of present-day Rome), then followed the river to site of Schenectady and had its eastern terminus at the site of Albany (in the vicinity of Castle Island, where the Dutch built Fort Nassau). Modern-day New York State Route 5 largely follows this path.

Afterwards, the GIW crossed the Hudson River into New England, taking the Mohawk Trail (largely followed by modern-day New York State Route 2, Massachusetts Route 2, and Massachusetts Route 2A). From there, the Great Trail network eventually went into Newfoundland, where it reached its northern terminus.
