= History of Lycoming County, Pennsylvania =

Coordinates: 41.201969°N 76.786333°W

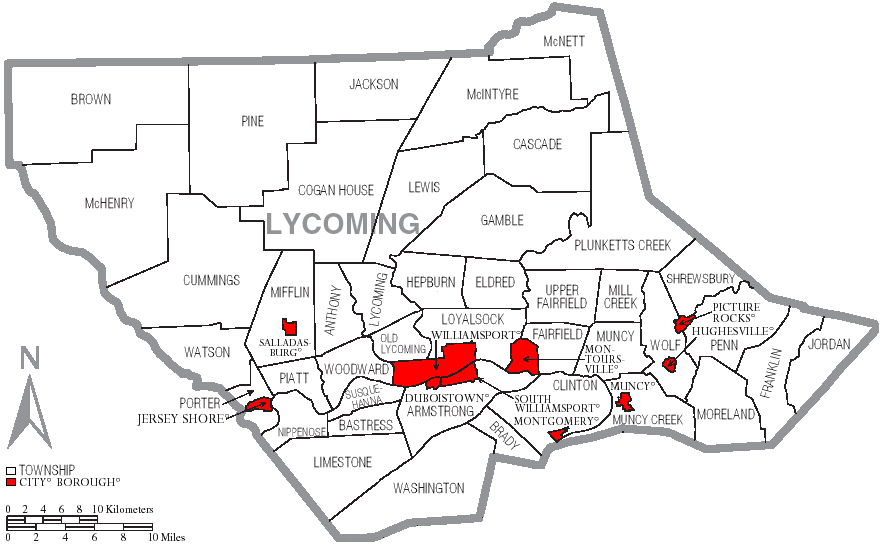
Map of Lycoming County, Pennsylvania with Municipal Labels showing Cities and Boroughs (red), Townships (white), and Census-designated places (blue).

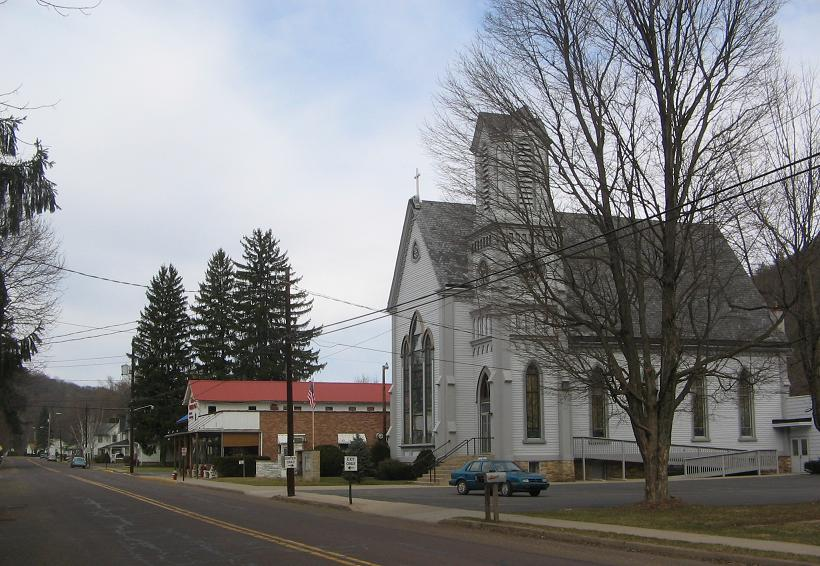
A view of Salladasburg, Lycoming County

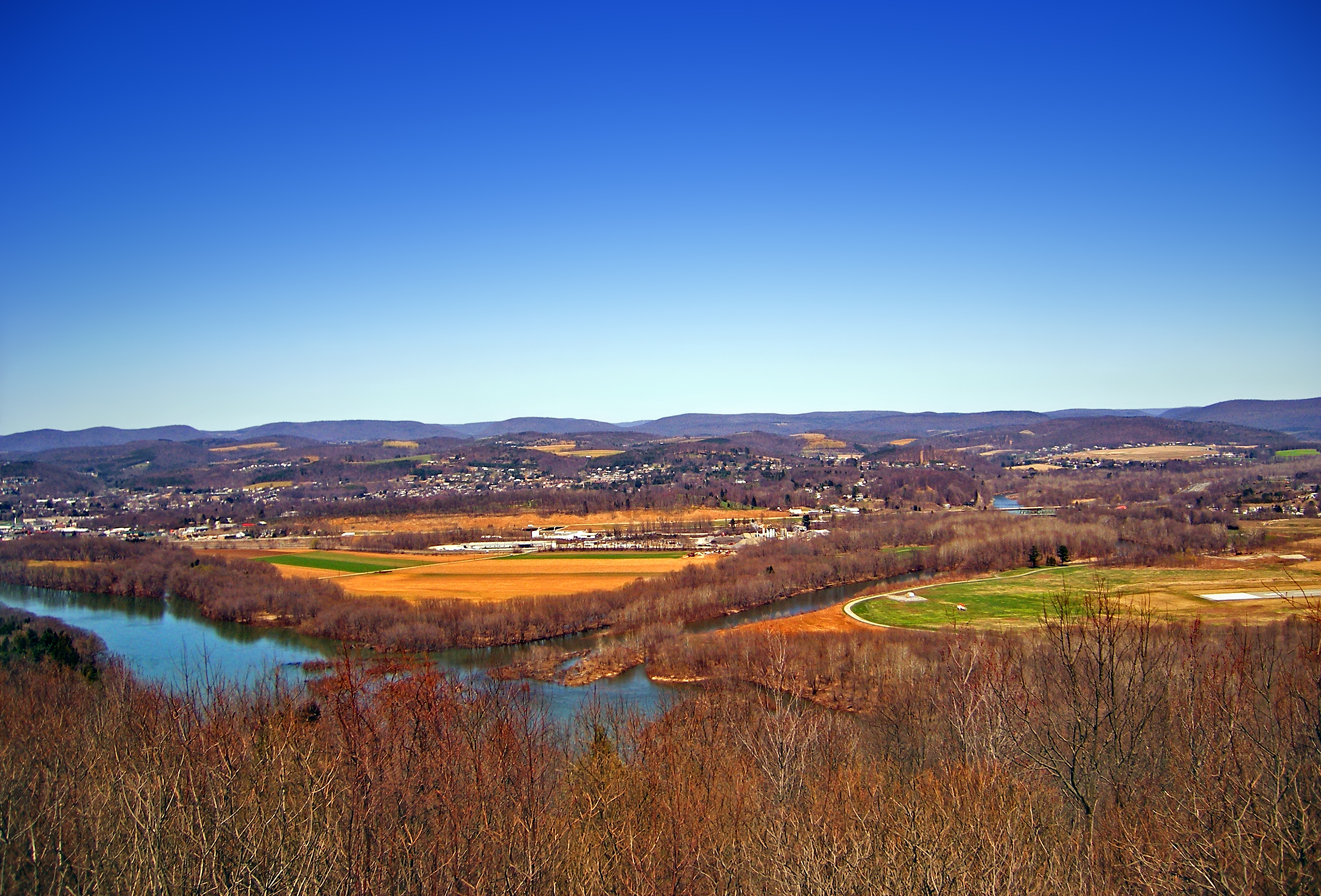
A view of the West Branch Susquehanna River Valley from Bald Eagle Mountain in Lycoming County.

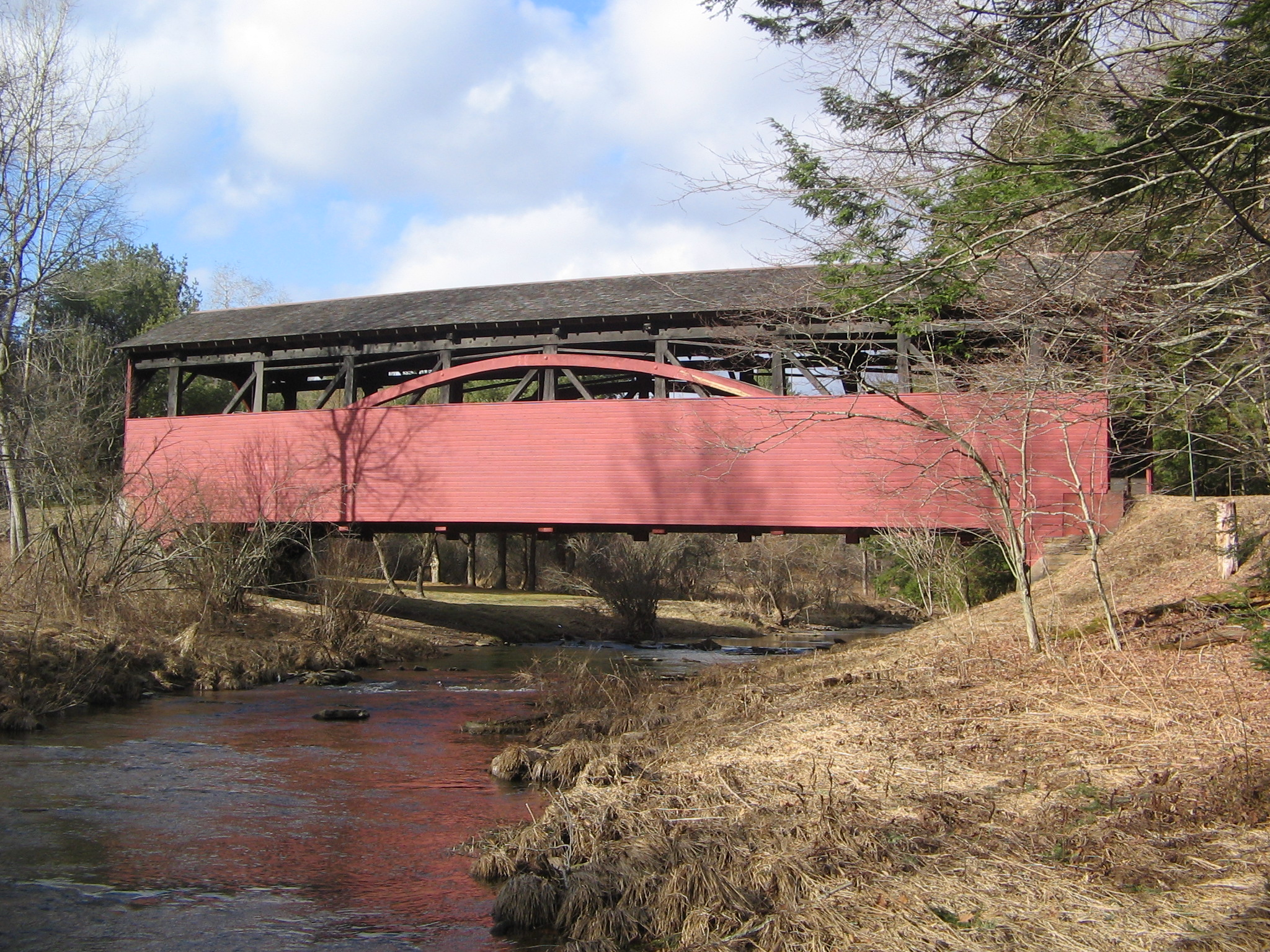
Cogan House Covered Bridge over Larrys Creek in Cogan House Township

This article details a history of Lycoming County, Pennsylvania.

== Early inhabitants ==
The first recorded inhabitants of Lycoming County were the Iroquoian speaking Susquehannocks. Their name meant 'people of the muddy river' in Lenape. Decimated by diseases and warfare, they had died out, moved away, or been assimilated into other tribes by the early 18th century. The lands of the West Branch Susquehanna River Valley were then chiefly occupied by the Munsee phratry of the Lenni Lenape (or Delaware), and were under the nominal control of the Five (later Six) Nations of the Iroquois.

=== Otstonwakin ===
Madame Montour's village of Otstonwakin or Ostuagy was an important location during the settlement of what is now Lycoming County. Her village at the mouth of Loyalsock Creek on the West Branch Susquehanna River was a stopping point for the Moravian missionaries who were spreading the gospel throughout the wilderness of Pennsylvania during the 1740s. Count Zinzendorf, a missionary being guided by Conrad Weiser with the permission of Shikellamy, came to Ostuagy in 1742.

Madame Montour was known to be a friend of the British. She welcomed the white men who were beginning to migrate into the West Branch Susquehanna River Valley. She also had a great amount of influence with the various Indian tribes as they were feeling the pressure of colonial expansion. Madame Montour remained loyal to the British despite several attempts by the French to bring her over to their side. Historians note that this was remarkable considering the British colonial government sometimes went as long as a year without paying her for her services.

Madame Montour was the mother of three children. A son, Louis, served as a translator during the French and Indian War. He was killed during the war. Her daughter, Margaret, later to be known as "French Margaret" went on to become the leader of "French Margaret's Town" an Indian settlement at the mouth of Lycoming Creek just a few miles up the West Branch Susquehanna River from Madame Montour's village. Her son, Andrew, took over leadership of Otstonwakin upon her death in the late 1740s. Andrew inherited his mother's gift for languages. He spoke French, English, Lenape, Shawnee, and the Iroquoian languages. Comfortable with both Native Americans and Europeans, he made a good living as a translator for both settlers and local tribes. In 1742 when Count Zinzendorf met Montour, he wrote that Montour looked "decidedly European, and had his face not been encircled with a broad band of paint we would have thought he was one." He also served as a translator with Conrad Weiser and Chief Shikellamy. He was granted 880 acres (3.6 km^{2}) of land by the Province of Pennsylvania in the Montoursville area. He was later appointed as a captain in George Washington's army at Fort Necessity during the French and Indian War. Andrew Montour left Montoursville at some point and moved to Juniata County before finally settling on Muntour's Island in the Allegheny River near Pittsburgh.

=== The Big Runaway ===
In the American Revolutionary War, settlements throughout the Susquehanna valley were attacked by Loyalists and Native Americans allied with the British. After the Wyoming Valley battle and massacre in the summer of 1778 (near what is now Wilkes-Barre) and smaller local attacks, the "Big Runaway" occurred throughout the West Branch Susquehanna valley. Settlers fled feared and actual attacks by the British and their allies. Homes and fields were abandoned, with livestock driven along and a few possessions floated on rafts on the river east to Muncy, then further south to Sunbury. The abandoned property was burnt by the attackers. Some settlers soon returned, only to flee again in the summer of 1779 in the "Little Runaway". Sullivan's Expedition helped stabilize the area and encouraged resettlement, which continued after the war.

=== Fair Play Men ===
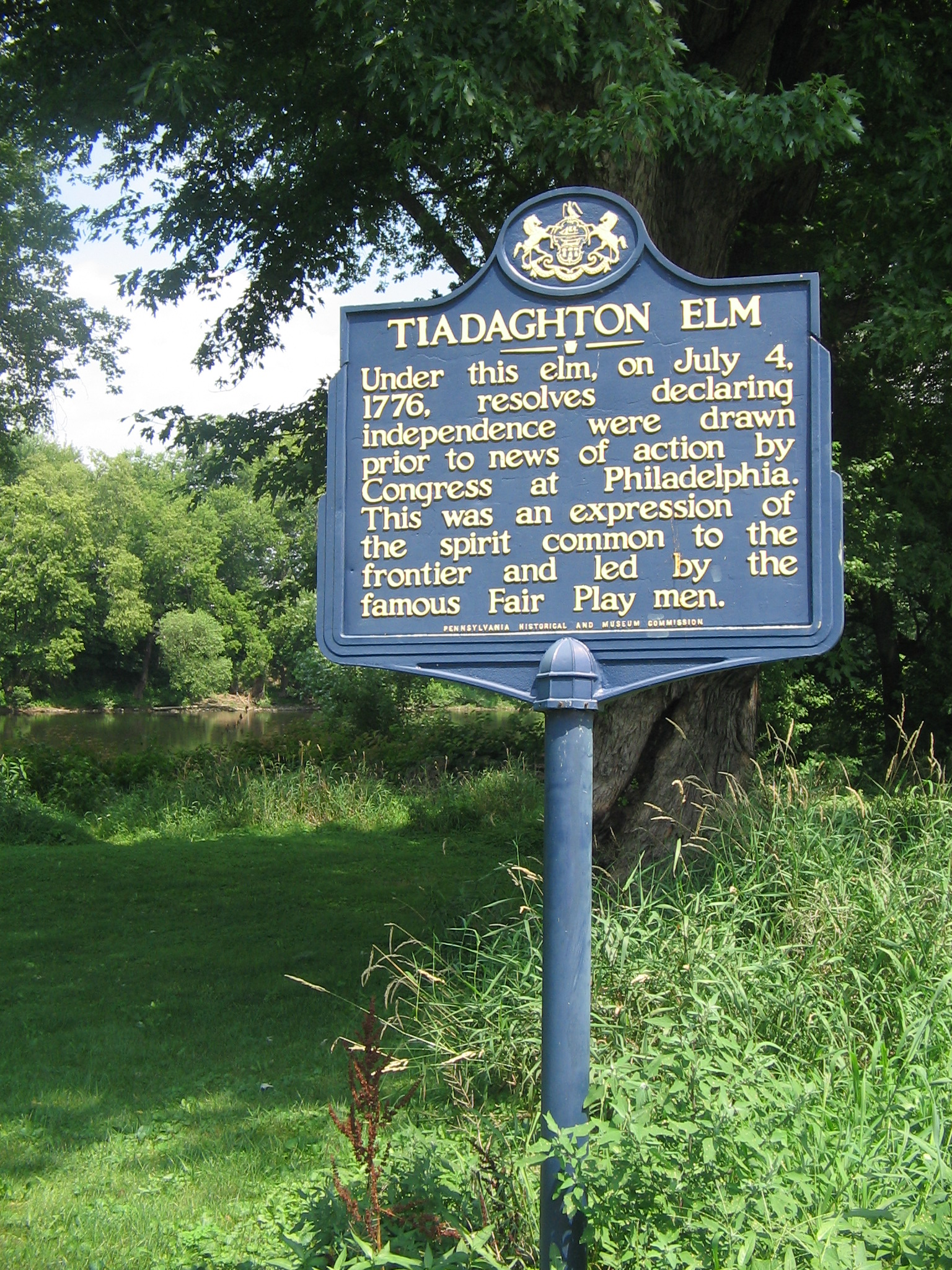
The site of the Tiadaghton Elm and the Fair Play Men's Declaration of Independence today. The elm is no longer standing, but Pine Creek is still visible in the background.

The Fair Play Men were illegal settlers (squatters) who established their own system of self-rule from 1773 to 1785 in the West Branch Susquehanna River valley of Pennsylvania in what is now the United States. Because they settled in territory claimed by Native Americans, they had no recourse to the Pennsylvania colonial government. Accordingly, they established what was known as the "Fair Play System," with three elected commissioners who ruled on land claims and other issues for the group. In a remarkable coincidence, the Fair Play Men made their own declaration of independence from Britain on July 4, 1776, beneath the Tiadaghton Elm on the banks of Pine Creek.

=== Fort Antes ===
Fort Antes was a stockade surrounding the home of Colonel John Henry Antes, built circa 1778 in Revolutionary Pennsylvania in the United States. The fort was built under the direction of Colonel Antes, who was a member of the Pennsylvania militia. It was on the east side of Antes Creek, overlooking and on the left bank of the West Branch Susquehanna River, on a plateau in Nippenose Township south of modern-day Jersey Shore in western Lycoming County. The local militia held the fort for a short period of time, until Colonel Samuel Hunter ordered them to abandon Fort Antes during the Big Runaway. Despite being abandoned and attempts by the attacking British forces to burn it down, Fort Antes was one of only two structures in the valley to survive the Big Runaway.

=== Lycoming Creek and the Sheshequin Path ===
Lycoming Creek and the Sheshequin Path played an important role in the early history of Lycoming County. The path was a major Native American trail in that ran between two Native American villages: French Margaret's Town on the West Branch Susquehanna River (part of modern-day Williamsport in Lycoming County) and Sheshequin on the North Branch of the Susquehanna River (modern day Ulster Township, in Bradford County). The path ran north and east along Lycoming Creek in Lycoming County and followed much of Towanda Creek in Bradford County. It was a shortcut between the two main branches of the Susquehanna River and was used by early settlers as well as Native Americans.

Lycoming Creek, which begins in McNett Township also served as a highway of sorts during the colonial era of Pennsylvania's history. The stream was used by early explorers and the Native Americans in the area as a means of travel. They were able to float their canoes down the creek and into the West Branch Susquehanna River. This mode of transportation was considerably faster than walking the path. Conrad Weiser guided Moravian missionaries along the creek and path to reach Onondaga, the capital of the Iroquois Confederacy in 1737. Raiding parties of Indian warriors used the creek and path in 1770 when conducting attacks on the West Branch Susquehanna Valley strongholds of Fort Muncy and Fort Freeland. Colonel Thomas Hartley led the 6th Pennsylvania Regiment up the Sheshequin Path during the American Revolution. Hartley's expedition in 1778 preceded the Sullivan Expedition of 1779. Both Hartley and Sullivan were instrumental in claiming the frontier of Pennsylvania and New York for the forces of the Continental Army. As Hartley and his men passed through Lewis Township, the Sheshequin path was widened. The widening of the path helped to open this area to settlement in the years following the Revolution.

== Formation of the county ==
Lycoming County was formed from Northumberland County on April 13, 1795. At the time it was formed, the county was much larger than it is today. It took up most of the land that is now north central Pennsylvania. The following counties have been formed from land that was once part of Lycoming County: Armstrong, Bradford, Centre, Clearfield, Clinton, Indiana, Jefferson, McKean, Potter, Sullivan, Tioga, Venango, Warren, Forest, Elk, and Cameron. Lycoming County was originally named Jefferson County in honor of Thomas Jefferson. This name proved to be unsatisfactory. The name change went through several steps. First a change to Lycoming County was rejected, next the name Susquehanna County was struck down as was Muncy County, before the legislature revisited and settled on Lycoming County for Lycoming Creek the stream that was the center of the pre-Revolutionary border dispute.

== County firsts ==
1615 - The first European in Lycoming County was Étienne Brulé. He was a voyageur for New France. Brulé descended the West Branch Susquehanna River and was held captive by a local Indian tribe near what is now Muncy before escaping and returning to Canada.

1761 - The first permanent homes were built in Muncy. Three log cabins were built by Bowyer Brooks, Robert Roberts, and James Alexander.

1772 - The first gristmill was built on Muncy Creek by John Alward.

1775 - The first public road was built along the West Branch Susquehanna River. The road followed Indian trails from Fort Augusta in what is now Sunbury to Bald Eagle Creek near modern-day Lock Haven.

1786 - The first church built in the county was Lycoming Presbyterian church, in what was known as Jaysburg and is now the Newberry section of Williamsport.

1792 - The first sawmill was built on Lycoming Creek by Roland Hall.

1795 - The first elections for Lycoming County government are held soon after the county was formed from Northumberland County. The elected officers were Samuel Stewart; the first sheriff and county commissioners were John Hanna, Thomas Forster, and James Crawford. Andrew Gregg was elected to represent Lycoming County in the United States Congress, William Hepburn was voted to the Pennsylvania State Senate, and Flavel Roan, Hugh White, and Robert Martin served as representatives in the Pennsylvania General Assembly.

1823 - The county government funded the construction of the first bridges over Loyalsock and Lycoming Creeks.

1839 - The first railroad was built. It connected Williamsport with Ralston in northern Lycoming County. The railroad followed Lycoming Creek.

== Founders ==
The founders of Williamsport—and to an extent, Lycoming County—were Michael Ross and William Hepburn. Both men played a great role in the formation of Lycoming County and the establishment of Williamsport as the county seat.

Michael Ross was born in Scotland on July 12, 1759. He and his mother migrated across the Atlantic Ocean in 1772 and landed in Philadelphia, Pennsylvania. They became indentured servants to Samuel Wallis, known as the "Land King" of the West Branch Susquehanna River Valley. Wallis had extensive holdings in Muncy Township. Wallis brought Michael Ross and his mother to Muncy Township, where Ross was trained as a surveyor's assistant. Michael Ross must have made a good impression upon Wallis, since Wallis gave Ross 109 acres (0.4 km^{2}) of land and a favorable letter of recommendation. Ross quickly became a successful surveyor and farmer. He was able to use his profits to purchase 285 acres (1.2 km^{2}) of land along the West Branch Susquehanna River, between Loyalsock and Lycoming Creeks. This land, originally called "Virginia," was to in time become Williamsport, the county seat of Lycoming County.

William Hepburn was in County Donegal, Ireland in 1753. He migrated to the Thirteen Colonies in 1773 or 1774. Hepburn lived in the Sunbury area for a short time before moving up the West Branch Susquehanna River to what is now Duboistown, where he worked for Andrew Culbertson in digging the race for Culberton's Mill. Hepburn also joined the local militia. During the American Revolution, the West Branch Valley came under attack from Loyalist and Indian forces. These attacks were known as the Big Runaway in 1778 and the later Little Runaway in 1779. Hepburn rose to the position of colonel and was the commanding officer at Fort Muncy, Samuel Wallis's fortified home in Muncy Township. Hepburn, reportedly, gave the orders to Robert Covenhoven and Rachel Silverthorn to spread the word of the impending attacks. Following the Big Runaway, Hepburn kept a permanent connection with the Covenhoven family by marrying Crecy Covenhoven, the sister of Robert. Hepburn also bought 300 acres (1.2 km^{2}) of land, to the west of Ross's holdings. His land, known as "Deer Park," when combined with Ross's "Virginia," would eventually become Williamsport.

== Selection of the county seat ==
The selection of Williamsport as county seat was a major controversy in the early history of Lycoming County. It involved a bitter rivalry between an old frontier town and an upstart town that was built on a swamp. The first commissioners and officers of Lycoming County had their first offices and held their first court in Jaysburg (now part of the Newberry section of Williamsport). Jaysburg was on the western side of Lycoming Creek on a high piece of land. The land to the east of Lycoming Creek was known as Deer Park and was quite swampy. Jaysburg was at the time the only sizable village west of Muncy. Although Muncy was and still is in Lycoming County, it was not considered as an option for county seathood, possibly due to its proximity to the southern and eastern borders of the county. Jaysburg's buildings were sufficient to serve as the first courthouse and jail in the history of Lycoming County. It seemed to be the most logical place for establishing a county seat, and many of its residents were sure that their town would indeed be the county seat. This was not to be. The county seat was awarded to a new community across the creek and Jaysburg soon disappeared from the map; its land was absorbed by the new city of Williamsport.

One of the first county judges, William Hepburn, owned the land on the opposite shore of Jaysburg that was known as Deer Park. Another land speculator, Michael Ross, owned 285 acres (1.2 km^{2}) of land in what is now the central part of Williamsport. Ross had laid out a town on his property, and a few homes were being built. Ross and Hepburn would team together to create Williamsport from land that was swampy and thought to be uninhabitable by the Susquehannocks who had originally inhabited the West Branch Susquehanna River Valley. Ross wanted to sell his properties and rightly believed that they would quickly sell if his town was made county seat. Hepburn, desiring political power, had little money by which to gain that power, but had a lot of land that could also be sold if Williamsport were to become the county seat.

The citizens of Jaysburg saw the attempts by Hepburn and Ross as a threat and they fought back. They believed that Jaysburg was much better suited to be the seat of government. It was already well established and held the higher and drier land. They argued that Williamsport would be frequently flooded and that the swamps would carry deadly diseases. The Jaysburgers sought to prove their point by sending an affidavit to the state capital stating that the land was prone to flooding and thereby unsuitable to be the county seat. A resident of Northumberland wrote an affidavit that he had once "tied up" his boat on a point of land on what is now East Third and State Streets in downtown Williamsport. He accessed it by way of a "gut" or an arm of the river that backflowed into the land. The affidavit was the proof that the Jaysburg interests needed to discredit Williamsport as a possible location for the county seat. Hepburn and Ross heard of this potentially financially devastating document and sought to have it destroyed before it reached the state government. It is supposed that men working for Hepburn and Ross met up with the messenger bearing the affidavit at the Russell Inn on the corner of East Third and Mulberry Streets in Williamsport and got him intoxicated. Then they are said to have cut open his saddle bags and made off with the documents.

The state commissioners by this time had begun to grow very weary of the rivalry between Jaysburg and Williamsport. They began to consider a third possibility for the county seat: a new village that was farther up the West Branch Susquehanna River, west of the mouth of Pine Creek in what is now Clinton County. The town of Dunnsburg even went so far as to offer, free of charge, lots on which to build the buildings that would be required by the county government. It appeared as if the state commissioners would choose neither Williamsport nor Jaysburg, instead choosing the outpost of Dunnsburg. This is when Judge Hepburn and Michael Ross set out their plan that ultimately led toward Williamsport being named the county seat.

Hepburn convinced Ross to offer lots of his property to the state commissioners for the building of a county courthouse and jail. This he believed would induce the state commissioners to give the seathood to Williamsport. Ross is stated to have had little interest in politics, but being a good businessman was interested in selling his land. Ross agreed to Hepburn's suggestion and the lots were offered to the state commission. The state commission accepted the lots, and Williamsport was finally named the county seat of Lycoming County.

When Williamsport was established as the county seat it was little more than a few cabins spread here and there in the aforementioned swampy areas. Jaysburg served as the de facto county seat for several years after Williamsport was "officially" named the seat of government for Lycoming County. This delay became a cause for concern to the residents of county and the state government in Philadelphia. The county commissioners delayed in constructing a courthouse and jail in Williamsport until 1799. The jail was finally opened in 1801. Next the commissioners approved the construction of the county courthouse in Williamsport. Construction also began in 1800 and work was completed in late 1804, nearly ten years after Williamsport was named the county seat.

== Susquehanna Boom ==
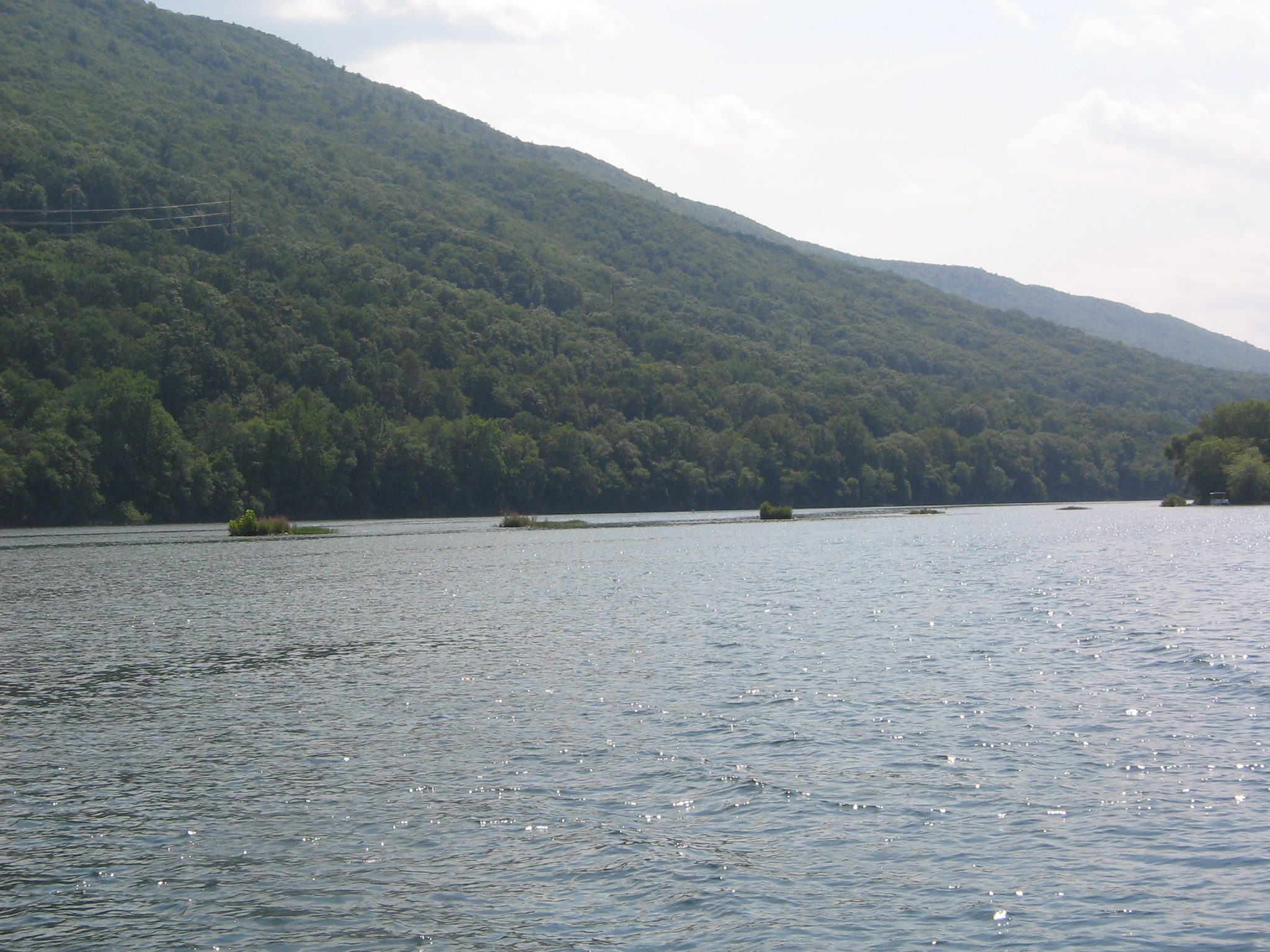
Islands left from the boom cribs in the West Branch Susquehanna River are all that is left of the Susquehanna Boom today

The Susquehanna Boom was a system of cribs in the West Branch Susquehanna River designed to hold timber in the river until it could be processed at one of the nearly sixty sawmills along the West Branch Susquehanna River between Lycoming and Loyalsock Creeks in Lycoming County, Pennsylvania in the United States. The boom was constructed in 1846 under the supervision of James H. Perkins. A boom is a chain or line of connected floating timbers extended across a river, lake, or harbor (as to obstruct passage or catch floating objects). The Susquehanna Boom extended seven miles (11 km) upstream from Duboistown to the village of Linden in Woodward Township. The boom was constructed by creating a series of man-made islands known as "cribs." These cribs, built of local mountain stone and sunken timber, were stretched diagonally across the river, beginning on the south side near Duboistown and ending on the north side near Linden. The boom was made of 352 separate cribs that were 22 feet (7 m) high. The boom was opened and closed at the upper end by a device known as a "sheer boom." It was 1,000 feet (300 m) long and was controlled with a hand-powered windlass. The sheer boom gathered the logs into the main boom that was capable of holding up to 300 million board feet (710,000 m^{3}) of logs. The lower end of the boom was where the logs were sorted. The mills in Williamsport, South Williamsport, and Duboistown each had their own distinctive brand burnt into the logs. The men working at the end of the boom would sort the logs according to their corresponding brand and float them into the correct holding pond along the bank of the river. During the height of the lumber industry in Lycoming County, 1861–1891, the various mills produced 5.5 billion board feet (13 million m^{3}) of lumber. Williamsport became one of the most prosperous cities in Pennsylvania and in the United States. Men like James H. Perkins, Peter Herdic, and Mahlon Fisher became millionaires, while many of the men who actually worked in the river struggled to survive on the wages paid to them by the lumber barons.

== Abolition riot of 1842 ==
The Muncy Abolition Riot of 1842 occurred in April 1842 in Muncy. The riot led to the conviction and ultimate pardoning of 13 men who rioted at a schoolhouse where a now-unknown abolitionist speaker, who had been invited by some local Quakers, spoke against slavery.

One of the common misconceptions about United States history prior to the Civil War is that all the citizens of the northern states were against slavery. In fact, many Northerners were all for slavery, especially in states closer to the Confederacy like Pennsylvania, Ohio and Delaware. There were more than a few abolitionists in Pennsylvania: Enos Hawley, a Quaker citizen of Muncy, was one of the most prominent abolitionists in Lycoming County. Hawley, a tanner by trade, was like most Quakers a strong supporter of the abolition of slavery. Hawley invited the now-unknown speaker to come to Muncy to speak against slavery. This speaker arrived in April 1842. His arrival and coinciding speech set off a tremendous riot that led to the near destruction of a local schoolhouse and the controversial pardoning of the rioters by Pennsylvania Governor David R. Porter.

During the course of the speech, eighteen men gathered outside the schoolhouse. They began throwing rocks and other debris at the school, breaking all of the windows. Enos Hawley and the guest speaker were both injured in the assault. Upon fleeing the school, the abolitionists were pelted with eggs. The rioters followed Hawley and his guest to Hawley's home at the corner of High and Main Streets. They continued the assault on Hawley's home until after midnight, when the local law enforcement officers were able to quell the riot and arrest the rioters. The rioters were indicted in September and went to trial in October; thirteen of the eighteen rioters were found guilty as charged. The jury's deliberation was quite a long process.

Abraham Updegraff was a member of the jury who was the driving force that led to the conviction of the rioters. Updegraff, an ardent abolitionist who was a vital member of the Underground Railroad in Lycoming County, was able to convince his peers that the rioters deserved to be punished. The first jury vote was 11 to 1 in favor of acquittal, with Upedgraff being the lone dissenter. Updegraff argued that "we have been sworn to try this case according to the law and the evidence presented and that if no contradictory evidence offered by the defendants than we could do nothing more than to convict them." He was able to make his argument in German, which was the native tongue of three other jurors. The second vote was 9 to 3 in favor of acquittal. A third vote brought about the conviction of thirteen of the eighteen men charged in the Muncy Abolition Riot of 1842. This conviction was essentially overturned by Governor David R. Porter when he pardoned the rioters several days later. Governor Porter's statement of pardon said, "It is represented to me by highly respected citizens of Lycoming County, that this prosecution was instituted more with a view to the accomplishment of political ends than to serve the cause of law and order."

Porter's pardon message placed the blame for the riot on the abolitionist speaker. Porter stated that the speech was "notoriously offensive to the minds of those to whom they were addressed and were calculated to bring about a breach of the peace." This pardon led to Governor Porter being given the less than flattering nickname of the "Previous Pardonin Porter." Historians believe that Porter pardoned the rioters under political pressure that was rampant, in the years prior to the Civil War, regarding the issue of slavery.

== The Underground Railroad ==
The Freedom Road Cemetery Historical Marker

Daniel Hughes was a conductor in the Underground Railroad based in Loyalsock Township and Williamsport. He was the owner of a barge on the Pennsylvania Canal and transported lumber from Williamsport on the West Branch Susquehanna River to Havre de Grace, Maryland. Hughes hid runaway slaves in the hold of his barge on his return trip up the Susquehanna River to Lycoming County, where he provided shelter on his property near the Loyalsock Township border with Williamsport before moving further north to eventual freedom in Canada. Hughes's home was located in a hollow or small valley in the mountains just north of Williamsport. This hollow is now known as Freedom Road, having previously been called Nigger Hollow. In response to the actions of concerned African-American citizens of Williamsport, the pejorative name was formally changed by the Williamsport City Council in 1936.

== The American Civil War ==
Soon after the beginning of the American Civil War, United States President Abraham Lincoln called for the northern states to muster 75,000 soldiers. Patriotic fever swept through Lycoming County as the people of the north anticipated what they believed would be a rapid defeat of the rebellious Confederate States of America. Twelve days after Fort Sumter was fired upon, Lycoming County was able to produce three companies of soldiers that totaled 244 men.

The three companies departed from the railroad station near the corner of what is now Pine Street and Little League Boulevard. On that day all businesses in Williamsport closed until the trains pulled away. Two civic bands played at the send-off. The train left the station at 8:30 amid loud cheers and celebration.

The citizens of Lycoming County continued to support the war in various ways as numerous trains passed through Williamsport from points north and west carrying new troops to the battles in the south. Ladies' groups set up tables at the Northern Central Railway depot. Here they were able to feed and encourage the passing soldiers. The tables were heaped with various foods and drinks including cold meat, bread, fresh vegetables, buttermilk, lager beer, and a variety of distilled spirits. Ladies Aid Societies banded together to roll bandages and knit socks, trousers, and shirts for the soldiers.

The exact numbers of soldiers from Lycoming County to serve during the Civil War is unknown. What is known is that 2,481 men from Lycoming County served in the war from May 12, 1863, until April 14, 1865. This count was conducted by the local Congressional District. The landlords and employers of Lycoming County routinely froze rent payments and held the jobs of the departed soldiers. The Lycoming Gazette reported, "Whenever a man quits an employment to go into his country's service his employer will religiously hold the same place open for him until he comes home again."

== City history ==
=== Williamsport ===
Williamsport is the only city in Lycoming County. It was incorporated as a borough on March 1, 1806, and as a city on January 15, 1866. The city is the original home of Little League Baseball, founded in 1939 as a three-team league.

In the late 19th century, when Williamsport was known as "The Lumber Capital of the World" because of its thriving lumber industry, it also was the birthplace of the national newspaper Grit in 1882. Williamsport once had more millionaires per capita than anywhere in the world. The area's local high school, the Williamsport Area High School, uses the Millionaires as its mascot.

== Borough histories ==
=== Duboistown ===
Duboistown (pronounced 'doo-BOYS town') is named for its founders John and Mathias DuBois, who bought 489 acres (2.0 km^{2}) of land between 1852 and 1857. The DuBois brothers divided their land into parcels and established the village that bears their name. John DuBois left the West Branch Susquehanna Valley before Duboistown was established as a borough. He sold his business interests and moved west to Clearfield County. He became quite wealthy and the city of DuBois was named in his honor.

The town built by the DuBois brothers is by no means the beginning of the history of Duboistown. It is situated at the mouth of Mosquito Run on the banks of the West Branch Susquehanna River. A tribe of Susquehannock Indians had what appears to have been a fairly major settlement at the mouth of the creek. The early European settlers found the remains of an Indian village there. Arhaeologic evidence of earthenware, soapstone ware, pestles, hatchets, ornaments, and charms were found on the land that is across the river from Lycoming Creek and nearby where the Sheshequin Path crossed the river.

The land on which Duboistown is located was first surveyed in 1769. At the time it was known as "Walnut Bottom" for the vast stands of black walnut that covered the alluvial plain on which the borough now stands. Samuel Boone, cousin of Daniel Boone held the first warrant for land at Walnut Bottom.

Andrew Culbertson was one of the first settlers to have success in the Duboistown area. He purchased several tracts of land beginning in 1773, including the parcel owned by Samuel Boone, near the mouth of Mosquito Run. Culbertson is thought to have moved into the by crossing an Indian Trail over White Deer Mountain that is now known as Culbertson's Path. He built a sawmill on the mouth of the creek so after moving to the area and there he lived for several years. Culbertson was forced to flee the area during the American Revolutionary War, when settlements throughout the Susquehanna valley were attacked by Loyalists and Native Americans allied with the British. After the Wyoming Valley battle and massacre in the summer of 1778 (near what is now Wilkes-Barre) and smaller local attacks, the "Big Runaway" occurred throughout the West Branch Susquehanna valley. Settlers fled feared and actual attacks by the British and their allies. Settlers abandoned their homes and fields, drove their livestock south, and towed their possessions on rafts on the river to Sunbury. Their abandoned property was burnt by the attackers. Some settlers soon returned, only to flee again in the summer of 1779 in the "Little Runaway". Culbertson returned to the area and rebuilt his sawmill. He also built a gristmill, distillery, and a press that extracted nut and linseed oils. His gristmill was especially important to the development of the West Branch Susquehanna River Valley. It was easily accessible by canoe. Farmers could float their grain in their canoes or other watercraft right up to the mill. Other farmers from the surrounding valleys reached his mill via Culbertonson's Path. Culbertson saw another business opportunity with the farmers who were coming to his mill. He quickly built a tavern in which the weary farmers could enjoy a drink and get some food while they waited for their grain to be ground into flour. This tavern became a popular destination for the young people of the West Branch Valley. Today Culbertson's Mill and tavern are long gone, and the area is a largely overgrown riverbank with an abandoned softball field surrounded by a railroad, bridge, and woods.

=== Hughesville ===
Hughesville is named for Jeptha Hughes, who purchased land from John Heap in 1816 and laid out the town of Hughesburg. Hughes sold the entire plot in 1820 to Daniel Harrold. The town grew slowly around a gristmill that was constructed by Jacob Clayton. A tavern was built in 1820 and a general store was opened ten years later in 1830. The first doctor in Hughesville, John W. Peale, arrived in 1828. Hughesville was incorporated as a borough on April 23, 1852. The first dentist opened an office in 1853 and the first lawyer settled in Hughesville in 1875.

Early industries in Hughesville were built to serve the farmers and citizens of eastern Lycoming County. They included a chair factory opened in 1829, a wagon shop in 1830, several distilleries, a sawmill and planing mill, and a furniture factory. Electricity was introduced to Hughesville in 1891 along with running water.

=== Jersey Shore ===
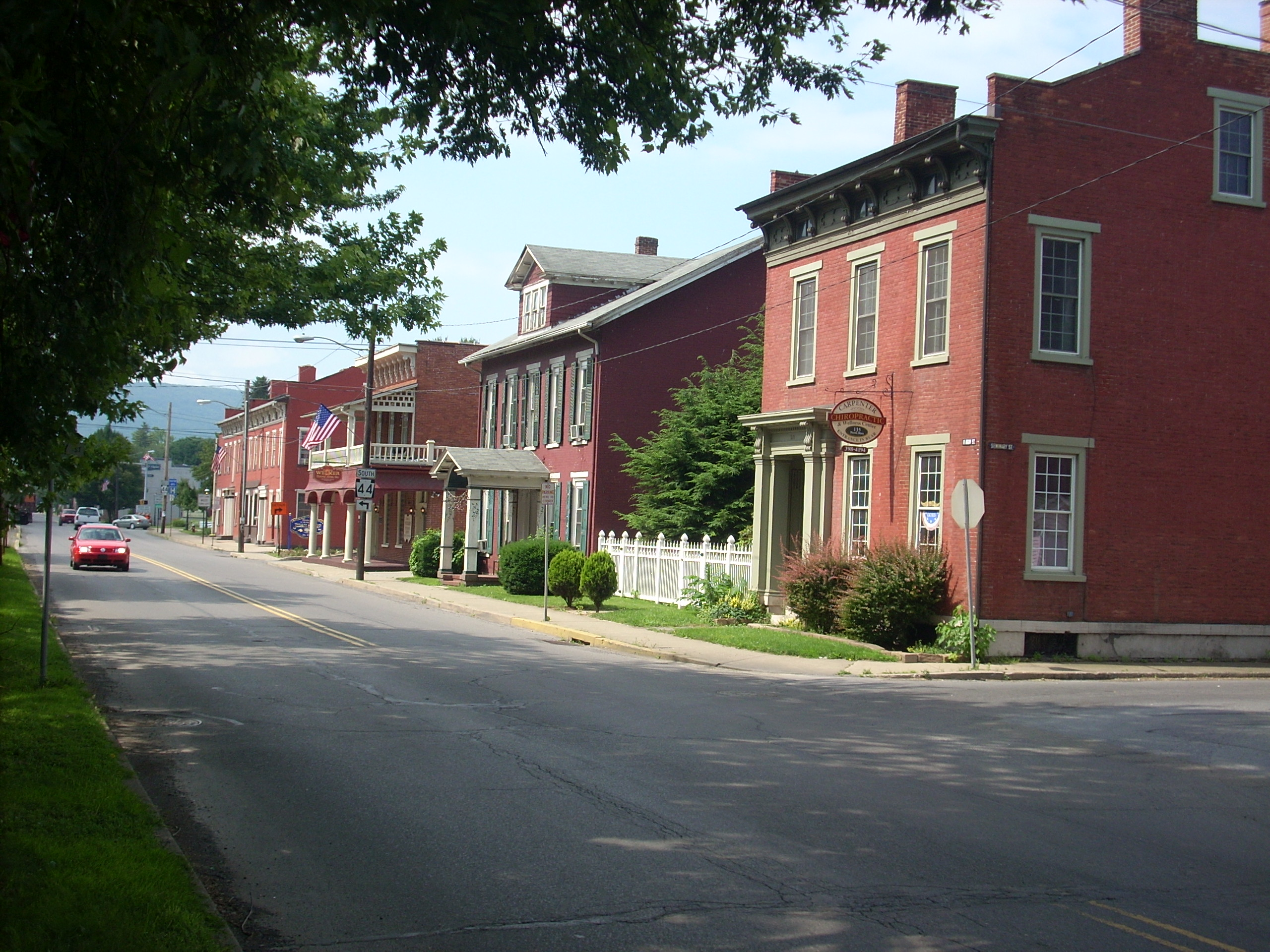
A view of historic Jersey Shore

Jersey Shore was incorporated as a borough on March 15, 1826. The history of Jersey Shore begins about fifty years before it was incorporated and on the opposite bank of the West Branch Susquehanna River in what is now Nippenose Township. Colonel John Henry Antes arrived in 1772 and established a homestead along the banks of Antes Creek. Antes also built a gristmill and his fortified home, Fort Antes, provided a safe haven for the early settlers against raids conducted by Loyalist and Indian forces during the American Revolution. Settlers who had sought refuge at Fort Antes and had returned to the right bank of the West Branch to milk their cows were among the first killed when Fort Antes was attacked just prior to the Big Runaway. These pioneers on the north side of the river were counted among the Fair Play Men a group of squatters who lived outside the jurisdiction of the colonial and revolutionary governments of Pennsylvania. Many of the settlers did not return to the area until after Sullivan's Expedition had forced the Lenni Lenape and other Indians allied with the British further west.

Jersey Shore was originally named Waynesburg by the two brothers, Reuben and Jeremiah Manning, who laid out the town circa 1785. Around the time that this was happening, a settlement arose on the eastern side of the West Branch Susquehanna River (Nippenose Township), opposite Waynesburg. A rivalry developed between the two settlements, and those on the eastern shore began referring to the settlement on the western shore as the "Jersey Shore," because the Manning family had relocated from New Jersey. The nickname became so fixed that in 1826 the original name of Waynesburg was officially abandoned and changed to Jersey Shore.

Jersey Shore's location on the West Branch Susquehanna River, just downstream from the mouth of Pine Creek, made it an ideal location for traders and other businessmen who outfitted the pioneers who settled the westernmost portions of the West Branch Susquehanna River Valley and the Pine Creek valley. Thomas Martin was a farmer who sold his produce to the people of Jersey Shore and to the men and women passing through. Mr. Martin was noted for his strong beliefs regarding the prices that he set. For example, if he believed that his potatoes were worth 35 cents a bushel, he would sell them for 35 cents a bushel; no more, no less. If the competitors would sell potatoes for 50 cents a bushel, Martin would not raise his price, and if others lowered the price to 25 cents per bushel, he would not lower his price. This firmness and fairness allowed Thomas Martin to rise to a position of prominence in Jersey Shore and Lycoming County. His reputation for fairness and honesty was passed onto his son Lewis Martin, who went on to serve as a Lycoming County prothonotary and as a deputy U.S. Marshal.

The Reverend John Hays Grier arrived in Jersey Shore in 1814. He was a Presbyterian missionary who originally set out from his home of Doylestown Pennsylvania with the intention of serving the pioneers of the west. He stopped one Sunday in Jersey Shore and for the most part never left. He built a strong congregation at Jersey Shore and another upstream on the West Branch in Lock Haven. Grier served the churches in Lock Haven and Jersey Shore for fourteen years before serving alone at the church in Jersey Shore for an additional twenty-three years. Rev. Grier was also elected sheriff of Lycoming County in 1822.

Jersey Shore was once a major player in the railroad industry. The New York Central Railroad built a large rail car building operation within the boundaries of Jersey Shore in the late 19th century. What had formerly been a minor stop on the Pennsylvania Canal and stagecoach lines was transformed overnight into an industrial boomtown. Over 1,000 skilled mechanics were employed at the car shops. They were able to earn wages that far exceeded the normal income of the average worker in Lycoming County at the time. Other early industrial ventures in Jersey Shore included the American Balance Valve and Machine Works manufacturers of railroad valves, Jersey Shore Steel, the Susquehanna Silk Mill, and the Jersey Shore Creamery Company.

=== Montgomery ===
Montgomery was incorporated as a borough by the Pennsylvania General Assembly on March 27, 1887, from part of Clinton Township. The history of the settlement of Montgomery begins in 1783, when John Lawson established a homestead there. Nicholas Shaffer built a gristmill in Montgomery in 1795. A sawmill and a wool carding mill were other early industries found on Black Hole Creek which flows through Montgomery.

P. M. Barber was the first person to come to Montgomery and establish an industry that achieved any sustainable success. He opened a distillery in 1859 and later a planing mill in 1869 on the site of the distillery. Barber, along with his partners, A.B. Henderson, Jesse Rank, and Nathan Fowler, had so much success that they laid out a town around their mill in 1870. The town was further expanded by the success of Montgomery Machine Shops, which, starting in 1873 under the supervision of Levi Houston, built woodworking machinery that was sold to clients throughout the United States and Canada and as far away as Australia.

Montgomery was previously known as Black Hole for the creek that flows through it; the post office was established in 1836 bearing that name. It was also known as Clinton Mills, again named for the post office. The name Montgomery stems from another name for the same post office, Montgomery Station.

=== Montoursville ===
The earliest history of Montoursville can be read at the "Ostuagy" section of this article or at Madame Montour.

Montoursville was incorporated as a borough on February 19, 1850. The history of the borough begins about forty years prior to its formal incorporation. John Else migrated to the Montoursville area from Bucks County, Pennsylvania in 1807 with his family when he was just ten years old. His father had a farm along Mill Creek in what is now Mill Creek Township. John Else worked to build the first permanent bridge over Loyalsock Creek in 1815. This was the first of many improvements that he helped build to establish Montoursville as a viable community in the West Branch Susquehanna River Valley. Else also built many of the structures in Montoursville, including its first permanent home.

John Burrows is recognized as the founder of Montoursville. He was born near Rahway, New Jersey. In his youth Burrows delivered mail on horseback, riding between New York and Philadelphia. He also served as a courier for General George Washington during the American Revolution for fourteen months. Following the war, Burrows migrated to Muncy and worked in the distilling business for several years. His work at the distilleries enabled him to build up the needed capital to make an investment in some land near the mouth of Loyalsock Creek, what is now Montoursville. Burrows also gained a measure of political clout in Lycoming County, serving first as a justice of the peace before being elected to the county commissioner's post in 1802, and later to the Pennsylvania State Senate in 1808. He bought 570 acres (2.3 km^{2}) in 1812. Burrows divided his land into lots in 1820 and sold them for $50.00 (~$1,152 in 2025) each. The first buyers of lots in Montoursville divided themselves into two distinct ethnic groups. The Germans settled in the eastern end in a neighborhood that became known as Coffeetown, while the English settled in the western neighborhood, known as Teatown. In addition to selling the lots in Montoursville, Burrows operated a highly successful farm. His produce was sent by raft down the Susquehanna River and on to Baltimore, where he was able to turn a profit. Burrows used these profits to further his enterprise by building the first gristmill in the town. He continued to sell lots until the time of his death in 1837.

Nathaniel Burrows, son of John Burrows, was another successful businessman in Montoursville's early days. He opened the first general store in the town. He also received the contract for construction of the Pennsylvania Canal in this section of Lycoming County. Nathaniel Burrows was able to influence the construction of the canal so that it ran farther away from the river than usual, and thereby closer to the town and the businesses of Nathaniel Burrows.

Indian Park is located on the northern side of Montoursville and is parallel to Interstate 180/U.S. Route 220. It serves as a large recreational park with several miles of hiking and biking trails, numerous softball fields, picnic areas, and pavilions and fishing ponds. Indian Park was a trolley park during the late 19th century and early 20th century. Visitors from Williamsport would board the trolley in downtown Williamsport and ride to Indian Park to spend a day of recreation along the banks of Loyalsock Creek. The park was home to one of the largest and longest roller coasters on the East Coast of the United States. The park also featured over 20 acres (81,000 m^{2}) of ponds, a theatre, and a merry-go-round. The amusement park was ultimately closed in 1924, due in large part to the rising and continued cost of reconstructing the park following the almost-yearly floods on Loyalsock Creek.

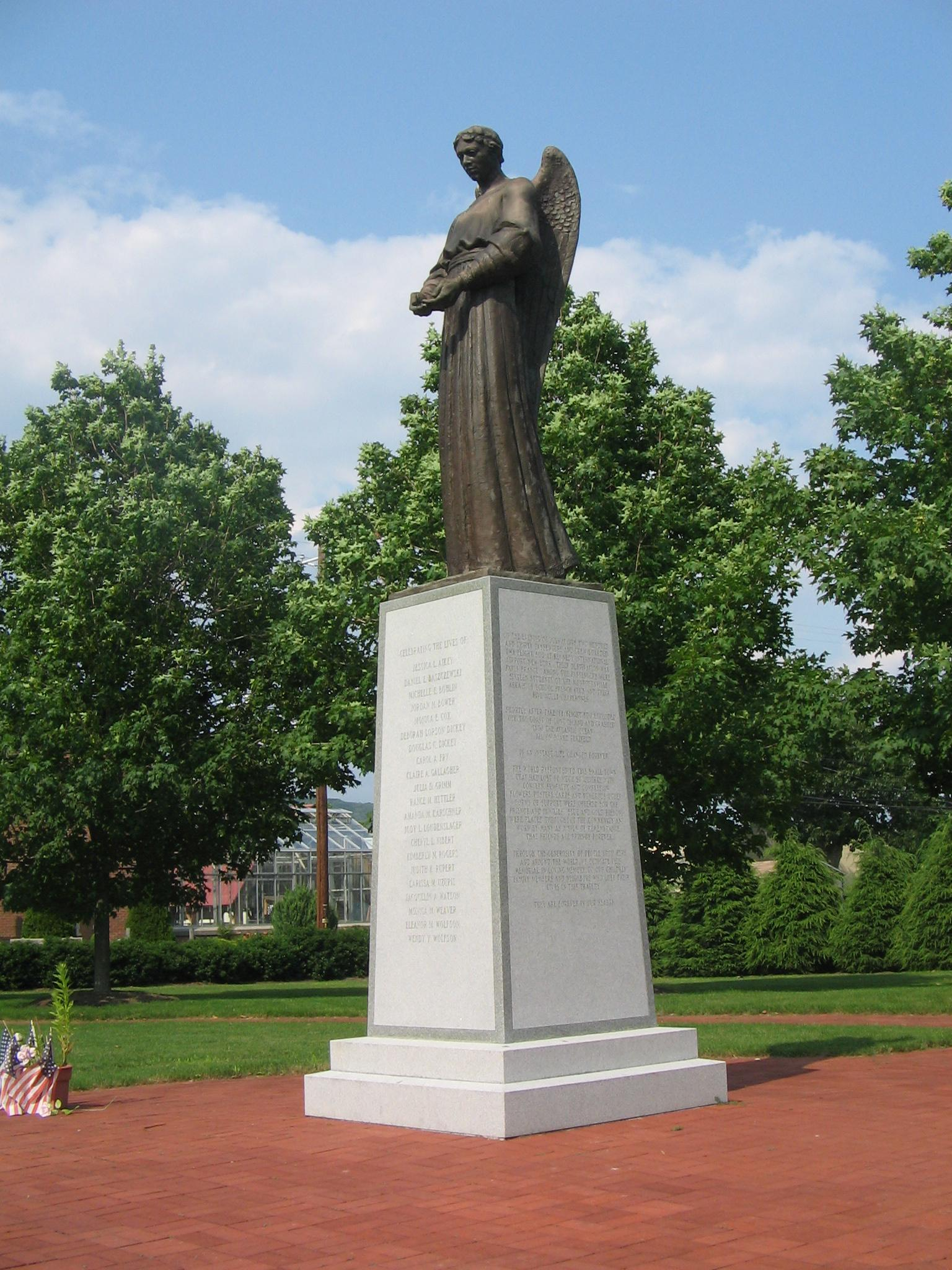
The Montoursville Flight 800 Memorial

Montoursville became famous worldwide when, on July 17, 1996, TWA Flight 800 exploded off East Moriches, New York, with the loss of 230 lives. On board were sixteen students from Montoursville High School and their five adult chaperones who were on a class trip to France as part of a student exchange program.

Condolences came from as far away as Japan, Australia, and Belgium. Tom Ridge, United States Secretary of Homeland Security (2003–2005), was governor of Pennsylvania at the time of the crash, and attended a vigil at the school with his wife. Ridge and New York City mayor Rudy Giuliani would also attend a memorial service honoring the victims. Among those who sent condolences were President Bill Clinton, the U.S. softball team at the Atlanta Olympics, and Francois Bujon de l'Estaing, French ambassador to the United States (1995–2002).

A memorial is located on the grounds of Montoursville High School. It is a statue of an angel (sculpted by James Barnhill of Asheville, North Carolina) on a base engraved with the names of the 21 local victims and a brief history. The memorial is in a circular grove of 21 trees (one for each victim). The angel was chosen because a cloud seen above the high school on July 21, 1996, was thought by many onlookers to resemble an angel, with 21 small clouds at its feet.

=== Muncy ===
About 1787, four brothers Silas, William, Benjamin, and Isaac McCarty, arrived in the Muncy area from Bucks County. They were of Quaker extraction. William and Benjamin bought 300 acres (1.2 km^{2}) known as the "John Brady farm" and divided it, William taking the portion between what is now West Water Street and Muncy Creek, and Benjamin the portion between West Water Street and the southern boundary. Main Street now represents what was then the boundary between the Brady farm and Isaac Walton's.

In 1797, ten years after coming to Muncy, Benjamin McCarty conceived the idea of starting a town, and began laying out lots on what is now Main Street, and sold them to different parties. His example was followed by his brother William, north of Water street, and by Isaac Walton. The town was named Pennsborough in honor of the William Penn.

The town grew slowly and was nothing but a village for many years. More than a quarter of a century passed before an act of incorporation was applied for. Finally, by act approved March 15, 1826, it was incorporated as a borough.

On January 19, 1827, with a population of less than 600, the name was changed from Pennsborough to Muncy. This was done because many persons thought it was "too flat and long", and the new name would be more in accordance with the historical associations of the place, and serve to perpetuate the name of the tribe that first dwelt there, a tribe of Lenni Lenape named Monseys.

=== Picture Rocks ===
Picture Rocks was incorporated as a borough on September 27, 1875. But the history of Picture Rocks began long before European settlers first arrived in 1773. The name of the borough is derived from the pictographs that were left by some of the Native Americans who previously inhabited the Muncy Creek valley. The paintings on the cliffs above Muncy Creek have long since disappeared. The town is built upon land that was once a Munsee Indian village. Evidence of this is found in the arrowheads and other relics that have been found in the vicinity of the creek.

The first warrant for property in the Picture Rocks area was issued by the Province of Pennsylvania to Henry Rody on June 3, 1773. The land was used very little and passed through several hands until 1848 when it was sold to A. R. Sprout and Amos Burrows, who went on to become the founding fathers of Picture Rocks. Sprout and Burrows worked to cleared the land that was thought to be worthless of the rocks, logs and brush that covered it. They also rebuilt an abandoned sawmill and established a factory that manufactured sashes, doors, and window blinds. This factory, the first of its kind in the area, caused a stir among the local carpenters who believed that the readymade building materials would curtail their profit-making ability.

The town grew up around the factory, and soon other manufacturers arrived to harness the water power provided by Muncy Creek. People interested in a lot in Picture Rocks were required to sign an agreement stating that they would not open a saloon or engage in the trafficking of liquor. This law was made by the residents and founders of the town, a majority of them being Baptists.

The Baptists of Picture Rocks organized as a congregation in 1840 and met for a while in a school house. A traveling preacher arrived in Picture Rocks one Saturday evening and found the school to be unfit for Sunday gatherings. After delivering his Sunday morning sermon, he rallied the members of the congregation around the cause of building a proper house of worship. Under the guidance of their new pastor, the members of the Baptist Church built a log building that served as their church for 25 years that was replaced by a larger facility.

=== Salladasburg ===
Salladasburg was laid out by Jacob P. Sallade in 1837. He started the town with lots for homes and built a church for use by Lutherans and Presbyterians only. The population of Salladasburg was 374 as of the 1890 census. The borough had a number of stores and shops, one hotel, a gristmill, and tannery. There were two schools and three churches. Salladasburg was incorporated as a borough in May 1883 by the Pennsylvania General Assembly.

=== South Williamsport ===
On November 29, 1886, the Lycoming County court incorporated the villages of Rocktown, Billman, and vicinities as the borough of South Williamsport. The land had previously been part of Armstrong Township.

The first recorded inhabitants of the Susquehanna River valley were the Iroquoian speaking Susquehannocks. Their name meant 'people of the muddy river' in Lenape. Decimated by diseases and warfare, they had died out, moved away, or been assimilated into other tribes by the early 18th century. The lands of the West Branch Susquehanna River valley were then chiefly occupied by the Munsee clan or phratry of the Lenni Lenape, and were under the nominal control of the Five (later Six) Nations of the Iroquois.

The British purchased land from the Iroquois in the Treaty of Fort Stanwix of 1768, opening what is now Lycoming County to settlement. After the American Revolutionary War, Lycoming County was formed from Northumberland County, on April 13, 1795. The county's area was originally over 12,000 square miles (31,000 km^{2}), and several other counties were subsequently formed from it.

Williamsport, across the river from South Williamsport, was also founded in 1795 and chosen as the county seat. The first settler in what is now South Williamsport is believed to have been Aaron Hagerman, a transplanted Hollander, who is thought to have arrived shortly after the end of the American Revolutionary War. Hagermans Run, which flows through the borough, bears his name.

One of the predecessor communities was called Rocktown. And another was Bootstown. One of the first businesses was a tavern established near the mouth of Hagermans Run by Michael McDonough. Another early entrepreneur, Jacob Weiss, gave the village a push toward borough status by purchasing a tract of 40 acres (160,000 m^{2}) and laying out town lots. Weiss also established a brickyard near McDonough's tavern and for many years operated an oil mill and a gristmill.

From those early times to the present, South Williamsport's fortunes have been linked to those of Williamsport. Sawmills and furniture factories were among the most prosperous industries in both communities. Planing mills and woodworking factories of all types reached a peak of activity during the logging boom of the post-Civil War years of the last century. The industry gradually declined in the 1890s when the surrounding hills were finally stripped of saleable lumber and the logging crews moved west.
