= Wauhatchie =

19th-century chieftain of the Cherokee Nation

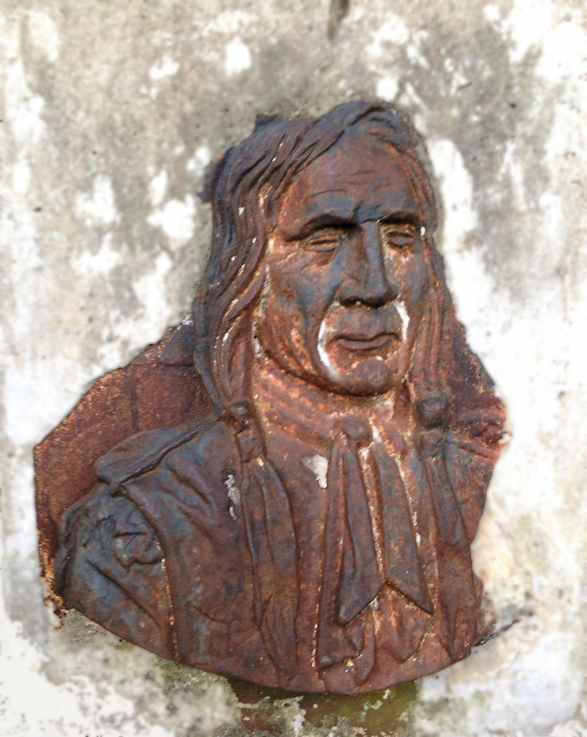
Weathered iron image of a Native American man, set in concrete, located on Old Wauhatchie Pike near Chattanooga, Tennessee.

Wauhatchie was a 19th-century chieftain of the Cherokee Nation. He lived along Lookout Creek in modern-day Hamilton County, Tennessee. In the War of 1812 he served in a company of Cherokees under Capt. John Brown, Col. Gideon Morgan and Maj. Gen. Andrew Jackson, fighting the Creek Indians from Jan. 17 to April 11, 1814. He was moved west in the Cherokee removal of 1838.

The name Wauhatchie in the Cherokee language means "terrible wolf".

== Legacy ==
Wauhatchie is the namesake of Wauhatchie Pike, the Wauhatchie Confederate order of battle, the Wauhatchie Union order of battle, the Battle of Wauhatchie, the CSX railroad yard, and the Wauhatchie Extension Railway of the Alabama Great Southern Railroad.
