= Wauhatchie Branch =

Stream in Georgia and Tennessee, U.S.

Coordinates: 34.9724°N 85.4037°W

Wauhatchie Branch is a stream in the U.S. states of Georgia and Tennessee. It is a tributary to Lookout Creek.

Wauhatchie Branch was named after Wauhatchie, a Cherokee leader.
