= Candy Cane Lane =

Candy Cane Lane may refer to:

== Places ==
=== Canada ===
- Candy Cane Lane, Bredenbury, Saskatchewan
- Candy Cane Lane (Edmonton), Alberta

=== United States ===
- Candy Cane Lane, Duboistown, Pennsylvania
- Candy Cane Lane, West Allis, Wisconsin
- Candy Cane Lane, Ravenna, Seattle, Washington
- Candy Cane Lane, West Frankfort, Illinois
- Candy Cane Lane, Pacific Grove, California

== Other uses ==
- Candy Cane Lane (film), 2023 film
- "Candy Cane Lane", a song by Point of Grace on the 2010 album Home for the Holidays
- "Candy Cane Lane", a song by Sia on the 2017 album Everyday Is Christmas
- "Candy Cane Lane", a song by Trisha Yearwood on the 2025 album Christmastime

== See also ==
- Candy cane, a candy stick served at Christmas from which the streets get their name
