= Culbertson's Path =

Native American trail in Pennsylvania, US

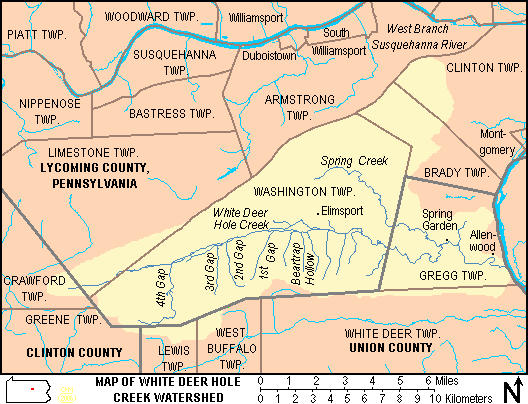
Map of the White Deer Hole Creek watershed, showing Allenwood, Spring Creek, DuBoistown, and Williamsport

Culbertson's Path was a Native American trail in north central Pennsylvania in the United States, which connected the Great Island Path with the Sheshequin Path. The eastern / southern end of the path was on the West Branch Susquehanna River at what is now the village of Allenwood in Gregg Township, Union County. The northern / western end was in Old Lycoming Township just north of what is now the city of Williamsport in Lycoming County.

Culbertson's Path followed White Deer Hole Creek west from Allenwood, then left to follow Spring Creek north, crossing North White Deer Ridge and Bald Eagle Mountain and following Mosquito Run to the West Branch Susquehanna River at the modern borough of Duboistown. Here it forded the river at Culbertson's Ripples (approximately the modern location of the Arch Street Bridge). From Allenwood to Spring Creek, Culbertson's Path and the Great Island Path shared the same trail. The Great Island Path led west to Great Island (modern Lock Haven), and paths there led west to the Allegheny River and beyond.

After fording the river, Culbertson's Path crossed the Great Shamokin Path (which also led west to the Great Island and beyond) to the village named "French Margaret's Town" on the west bank of Lycoming Creek (modern Williamsport). Culbertson's Path then continued north to modern Old Lycoming Township, where it joined the major Sheshequin Path, which led north up Lycoming Creek towards the North Branch of the Susquehanna River, modern New York state, and the Iroquois people there.

South of Allenwood, there were connections via the Great Island Path to the village of Shamokin (modern Sunbury), as well as the Virginia Road and the Penns Creek and Mahanoy Paths.

The path was only wide enough for one person, but the early inhabitants of White Deer Hole valley broadened the trail to DuBoistown to take grain to Culbertson's mill on Mosquito Run (leading them to call it "Culbertson's path"). In 2006, there is still a "Culbertson's Trail", for hiking over North White Deer Ridge and Bald Eagle Mountain from Pennsylvania Route 554 to Duboistown.
