= Great Island Path =

Native American trail in Pennsylvania

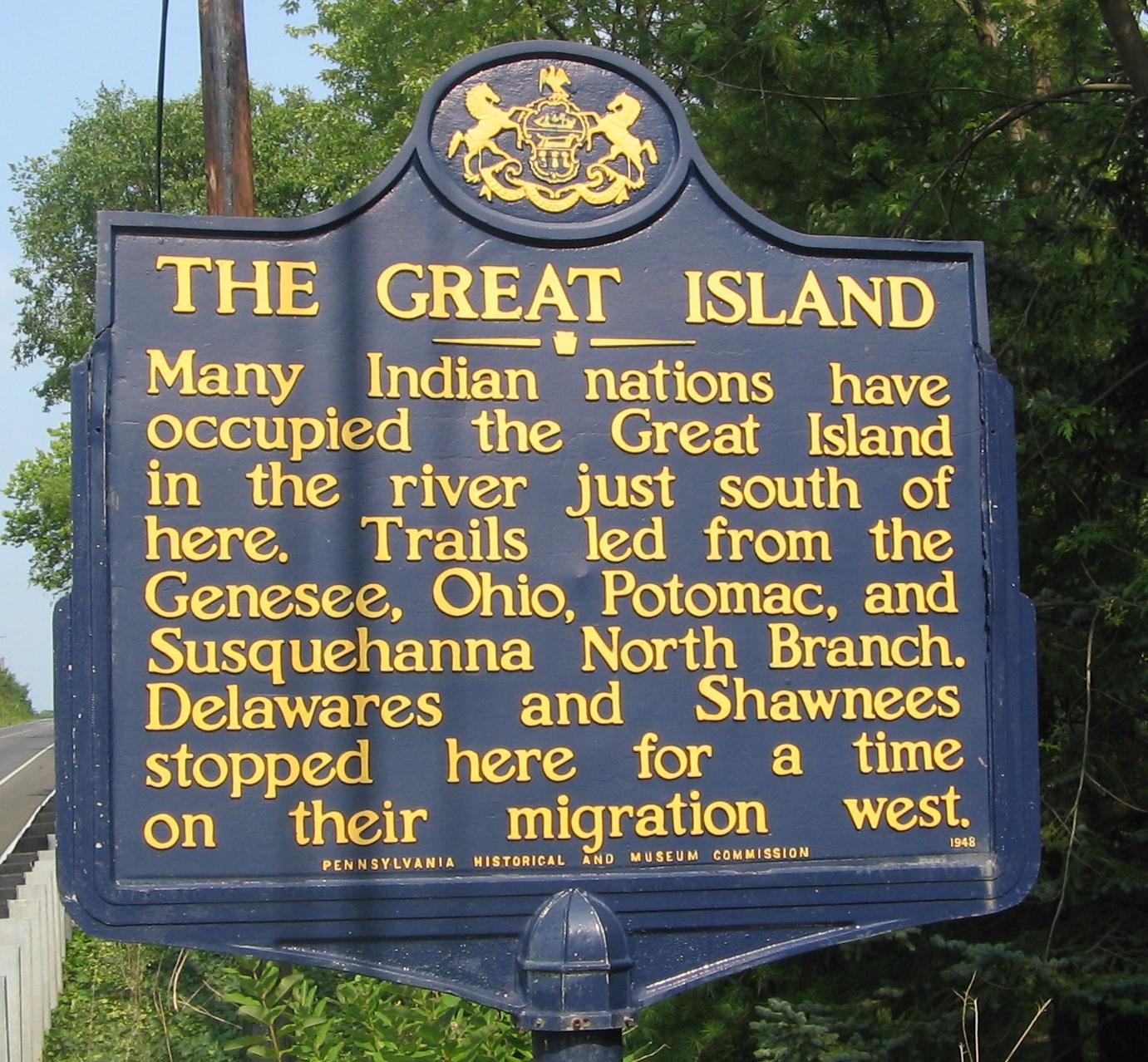
Pennsylvania State Historical Marker north of the Great Island on Pennsylvania Route 150

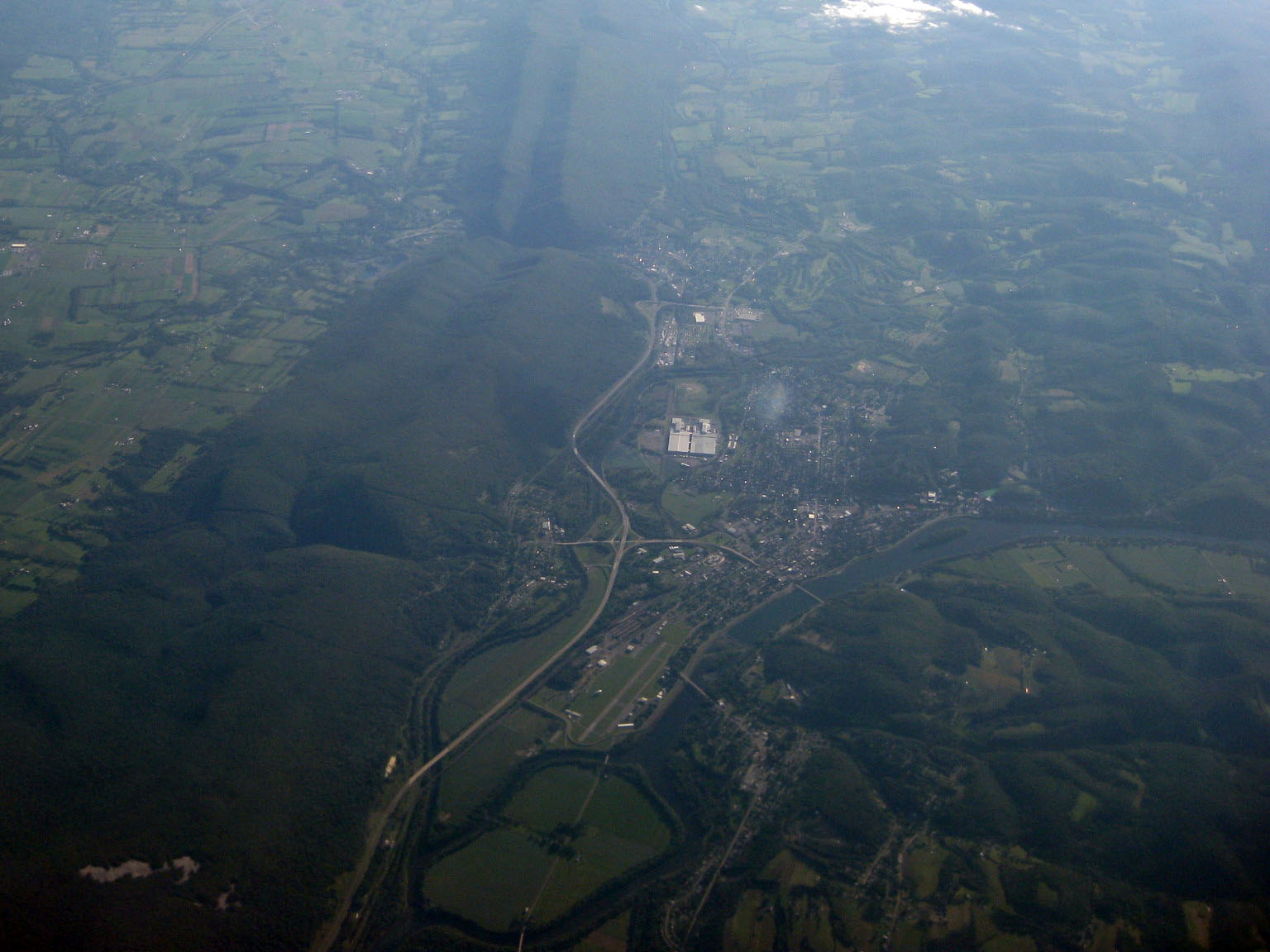
Aerial photo of modern-day Lock Haven, Pennsylvania - the Great Island in the West Branch Susquehanna River is at lower center.

The Great Island Path was a major Native American trail in the U.S. state of Pennsylvania that ran from the village of Shamokin (modern-day Sunbury) along the right bank of the West Branch Susquehanna River north and then west to the Great Island (near modern-day Lock Haven).

The village of Shamokin was just south of the "forks of the Susquehanna", the confluence of the West Branch Susquehanna River with the Susquehanna River (sometimes called the North Branch). According to Meginness (1892), the path crossed the river "...in shallow water on a ledge of rocks since destroyed by the erection of the dam at Sunbury..." to the west (right) bank at about the current location of Shamokin Dam in Snyder County. The path then continued "...up the ravine in Blue Hill and followed the present road for a few miles" along the ridge which is the border between Snyder and Union counties. The path then turned "...towards the river, passed over the hill and followed the river through Winfield and Lewisburg; thence to Buffalo Creek, which it crossed where the iron bridge now spans it. Then it curved to the river and passed through Shikellimy's town, which stood at the mouth of Sinking Run...". Today this is the site of Shikellamy State Park. This route along the west side of the river is where U.S. Route 15 runs today.

Next the path "...followed the river along the base of the hills into White Deer valley..." where it turned west at what is now the village of Allenwood, following White Deer Hole Creek into Lycoming County "...along the south branch of the creek, near where the village of Elimsport is located, and over the mountain [i.e. North White Deer Ridge] into Nippenose valley through which it passed to the head thereof." The stretch from the mouth of White Deer Hole Creek to the head of the Nippenose valley is the approximate route of Pennsylvania Route 44 today.

The path then crossed into Clinton County "...over the hills and through a ravine in Bald Eagle Mountain to the river, where there was a fording to Great Island". A small part of the crossing over the hills has been incorporated into the Mid State Trail. The ravine is formed by McElhattan Creek, and the Lock Haven Reservoir is located there now. The Great Island is just east of the present-day city of Lock Haven.

From the Great Island, the Great Shamokin Path, which followed the opposite bank of the river north from Shamokin village, continued further west to what are now the boroughs of Clearfield and finally Kittanning. Culbertson's Path left White Deer Hole Creek to follow Spring Creek north to modern Duboistown, where it crossed the river to the Sheshequin Path north.
