= Duboistown, Pennsylvania =

Borough in Pennsylvania, US

- Borough
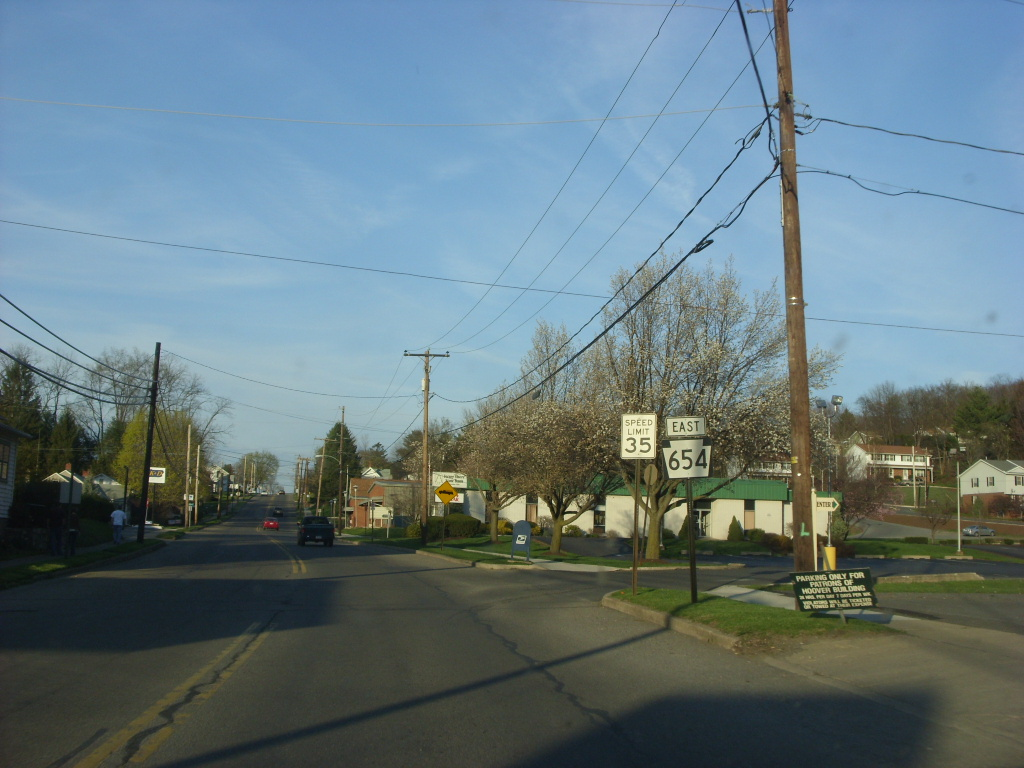
- Euclid Avenue in Duboistown

- Location of Duboistown in Lycoming County, Pennsylvania.

- Map of Pennsylvania highlighting Lycoming County
- Coordinates: 41°13′31″N 77°2′6″W
- Country: United States
- State: Pennsylvania
- County: Lycoming
- Settled: 1773
- Laid out: 1852
- Incorporated: 1878

Area
  - Total: 0.68 sq mi (1.76 km^{2})
  - Land: 0.55 sq mi (1.43 km^{2})
  - Water: 0.13 sq mi (0.33 km^{2})
- Elevation (center of borough): 580 ft (180 m)
- Highest elevation (southwestern boundary of borough): 940 ft (290 m)
- Lowest elevation (West Branch Susquehanna River): 510 ft (160 m)

Population (2020)
  - Total: 1,200
  - Density: 2,172.6/sq mi (838.85/km^{2})
- Time zone: UTC-5 (Eastern (EST))
  - Summer (DST): UTC-4 (EDT)
- ZIP code: 17702
- Area code: 570
- FIPS code: 42-20144
- GNIS feature ID: 1192377
- Website: https://www.duboistownborough.com/

Duboistown is a borough in Lycoming County, Pennsylvania, United States. The population was 1,198 at the 2020 census. It is part of the Williamsport, Pennsylvania Metropolitan Statistical Area.

== History ==
Duboistown (pronounced 'doo-BOYS town') is named for its founders John and Mathias DuBois who bought 489 acres (1.98 km^{2}) of land between 1852 and 1857. The DuBois brothers divided their land into parcels and established the village that bears their name. John DuBois left the West Branch Susquehanna Valley before Duboistown was established as a borough. He sold his business interests and moved west to Clearfield County. He became quite wealthy and the city of DuBois was named in his honor.

The town built by the DuBois brothers and established as a borough in 1878 is by no means the beginning of the history of Duboistown. It is situated at the mouth of Mosquito Run on the banks of the West Branch Susquehanna River. A tribe of Susquehannock Indians had what appears to have been a fairly major settlement at the mouth of the creek. The early European settlers found the remains of an Indian village there. Arhaeologic evidence of earthenware, soapstone ware, pestles, hatchets, ornaments and charms were found on the land that is across the river from Lycoming Creek and near where the Sheshequin Path crossed the river.

The land on which Duboistown is located was first surveyed in 1769. At the time it was known as "Walnut Bottom" for the vast stands of black walnut that covered the alluvial plain on which the borough now stands. Samuel Boone, cousin of Daniel Boone, held the first warrant for land at Walnut Bottom.

Andrew Culbertson was one of the first settlers to have success in the Duboistown area. He purchased several tracts of land beginning in 1773, including the parcel owned by Samuel Boone, near the mouth of Mosquito Run. Culbertson is thought to have moved into the area by crossing an Indian Trail over White Deer Mountain that is now known as Culbertson's Path. He built a sawmill at the mouth of the creek soon after moving to the area, and he lived in the area for several years before being forced to flee during the American Revolutionary War, when settlements throughout the Susquehanna valley were attacked by Loyalists and their Indian allies. After the Battle of Wyoming in the summer of 1778 (near what is now Wilkes-Barre) and smaller local attacks, the "Big Runaway" occurred throughout the West Branch Susquehanna valley. Settlers fled feared and actual attacks by the British and their allies. Settlers abandoned their homes and fields, drove their livestock south, and towed their possessions on rafts on the river to Sunbury. Their abandoned property was burned by the attackers. Some settlers soon returned, only to flee again in the summer of 1779 in the "Little Runaway". Culbertson returned to the area and rebuilt his sawmill. He also built a gristmill, distillery, and a press that extracted nut and linseed oils. His gristmill was especially important to the development of the West Branch Susquehanna River Valley. It was easily accessible from canoe. Farmers could float their grain in their canoes or other watercraft right up to the mill. Other farmers from the surrounding valleys reached his mill via Culbertson's Path. Culbertson saw another business opportunity with the farmers who were coming to his mill. He quickly built a tavern in which the weary farmers could enjoy a drink and get some food while they waited for their grain to be ground into flour. This tavern became a popular destination for the young people of the West Branch Valley. Today Culbertson's Mill and tavern are long gone and the area is a largely overgrown riverbank with an abandoned softball field, that is surrounded by a railroad, bridge, and woods.

The 200 block of Summer Street in Duboistown is decorated for Christmas each December and is known as Candy Cane Lane. In 2007, the mayor of the borough proclaimed the month of "December as Candy Cane Lane month forever more in DuBoistown".

== Geography ==
Duboistown is located at 41°13′31″N 77°2′6″W (41.225278, -77.034953). It is bordered by South Williamsport to the east, Armstrong Township to the south and west, and the West Branch Susquehanna River to the north (with Williamsport north of the river). As the crow flies, Lycoming County is approximately 130 miles (209 km) northwest of Philadelphia and 165 miles (266 km) east-northeast of Pittsburgh.

According to the United States Census Bureau, the borough has a total area of 0.6 square miles (1.6 km^{2}), of which 0.6 square mile (1.5 km^{2}) is land and 0.1 square miles (0.26 km^{2}) (13.85%) is water.

== Demographics ==
Historical population
Census	Pop.	Note	%±
1880	662		—
1890	697		5.3%
1900	650		−6.7%
1910	682		4.9%
1920	756		10.9%
1930	1,049		38.8%
1940	1,047		−0.2%
1950	1,140		8.9%
1960	1,358		19.1%
1970	1,468		8.1%
1980	1,218		−17.0%
1990	1,201		−1.4%
2000	1,280		6.6%
2010	1,205		−5.9%
2020	1,200		−0.4%
2021 (est.)	1,191	▼	−0.7%

As of the census of 2000, there were 1,280 people, 540 households, and 372 families residing in the borough. The population density was 2,293.5 inhabitants per square mile (885.5/km^{2}). There were 558 housing units at an average density of 999.8 per square mile (386.0/km^{2}). The racial makeup of the borough was 98.67% White, 0.16% African American, 0.08% Native American, 0.47% Asian, 0.16% Pacific Islander, and 0.47% from two or more races. Hispanic or Latino of any race were 0.08% of the population.

There were 540 households, out of which 28.1% had children under the age of 18 living with them, 58.5% were married couples living together, 7.2% had a female householder with no husband present, and 31.1% were non-families. 27.2% of all households were made up of individuals, and 14.4% had someone living alone who was 65 years of age or older. The average household size was 2.36 and the average family size was 2.87.

In the borough the population was spread out, with 22.7% under the age of 18, 6.3% from 18 to 24, 27.2% from 25 to 44, 22.8% from 45 to 64, and 20.9% who were 65 years of age or older. The median age was 41 years. For every 100 females, there were 93.6 males. For every 100 females age 18 and over, there were 85.9 males.

The median income for a household in the borough was $35,132, and the median income for a family was $41,450. Males had a median income of $31,172 versus $22,500 for females. The per capita income for the borough was $17,348. About 4.0% of families and 5.3% of the population were below the poverty line, including 3.5% of those under age 18 and 6.6% of those age 65 or over.

== See also ==
History of Lycoming County, Pennsylvania
