= Candy Cane Lane, Duboistown =

Holiday attraction in Duboistown, Pennsylvania

Coordinates: 41.224295°N 77.032517°W

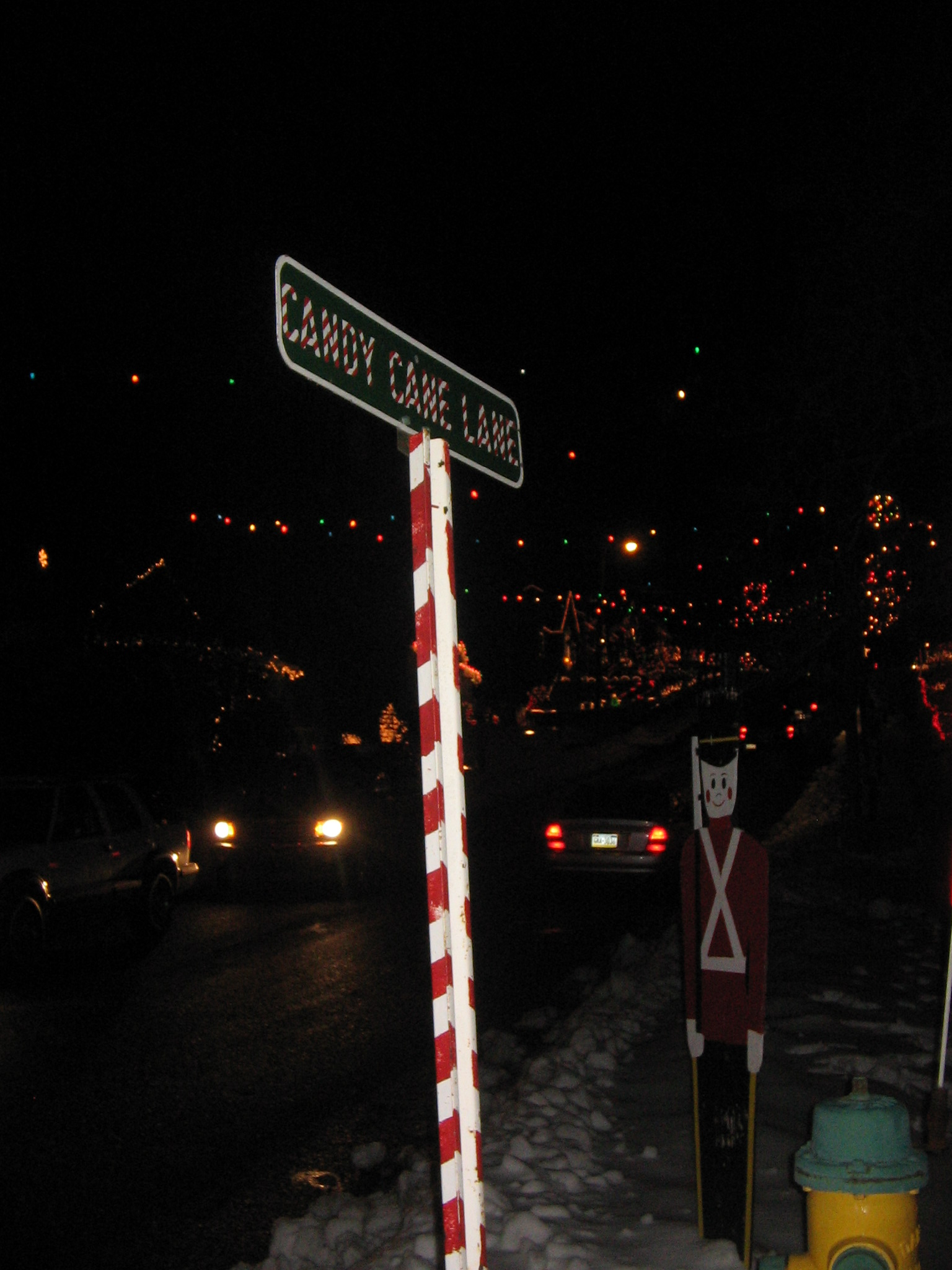
The Candy Cane Lane street sign, with decorations and lights behind

Candy Cane Lane is the name given to the 200 block of Summer Street in Duboistown in the U.S. state of Pennsylvania when it is decorated for Christmas from Thanksgiving to The Epiphany each year. In 2007 Candy Cane Lane celebrated its fiftieth anniversary and was honored with a parade and a proclamation by the mayor of the borough proclaiming the month of "December as Candy Cane Lane month forever more in DuBoistown".

== Location ==
Duboistown is a borough in Lycoming County, Pennsylvania, which is about 130 miles (210 km) northwest of Philadelphia and 165 miles (266 km) east-northeast of Pittsburgh. Duboistown is between the West Branch Susquehanna River to the north and Bald Eagle Mountain to the south. The city of Williamsport lies to the north of Duboistown across the river, the borough of South Williamsport is east, and Armstrong Township is to the west and south.

Summer Street runs north–south in Duboistown, with Winter Street to the west and Spring Street to the east. Summer Street is only two blocks long and the 200 block, between Euclid Avenue (which is also Pennsylvania Route 654) to the north and Highland Avenue to the south. The 200 block of Summer Street is the part of the street known as Candy Cane Lane.

== Fiftieth anniversary ==
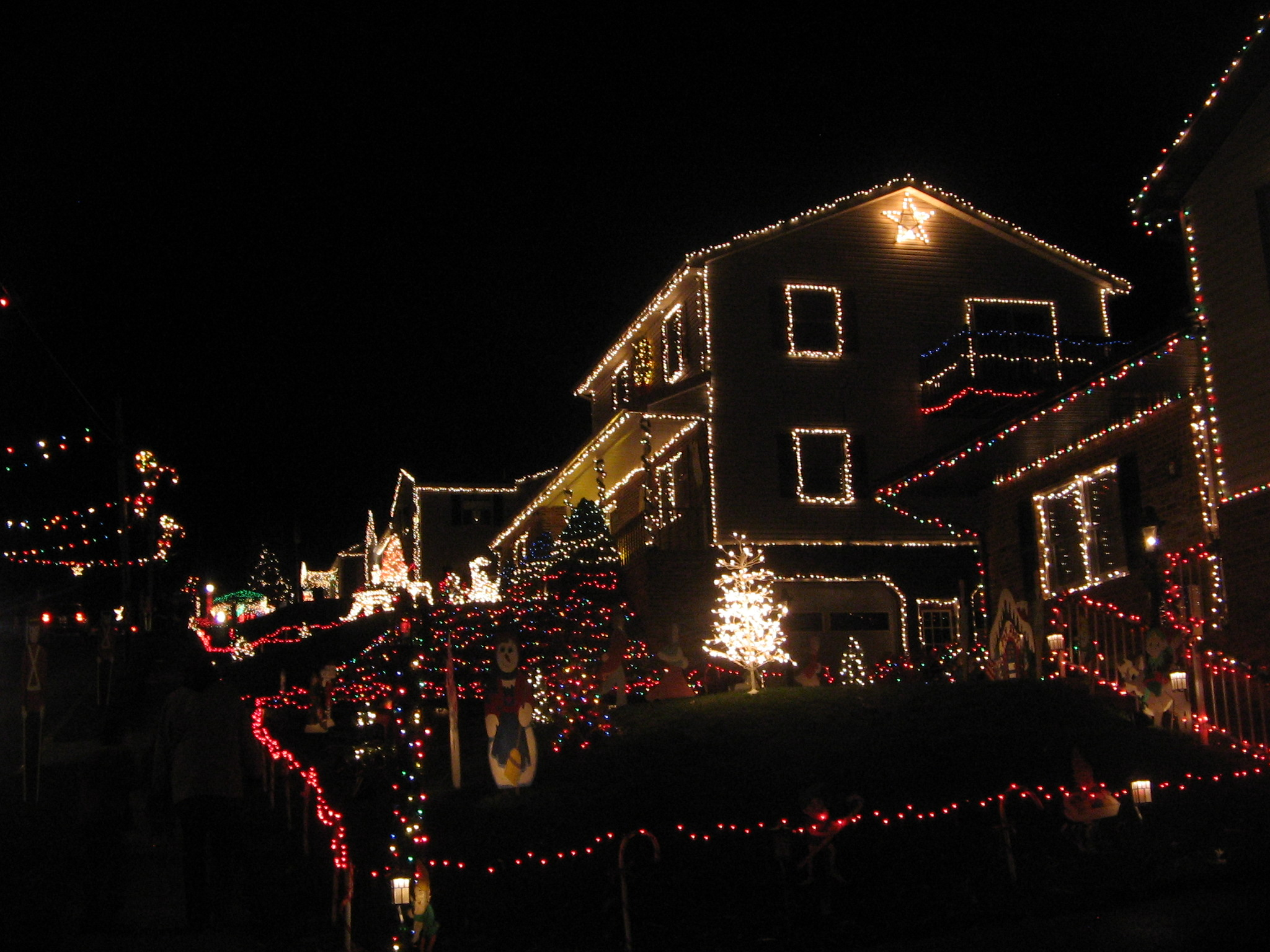
View looking up the west side of Candy Cane Lane in December 2009

Candy Cane Lane was first decorated for Christmas in 1957. On December 9, 2007, the borough of Duboistown celebrated the fiftieth anniversary of Candy Cane Lane with a parade and proclamation. The parade featured thirty units, including floats, fire and police vehicles, marching bands, local politicians and celebrities, and people dressed as elves, Dugout (the Little League Baseball mascot), Frosty the Snowman, Santa and Mrs. Claus. A celebration followed in the Duboistown Fire Hall.

The 200 block of Summer Street has only thirteen houses on it: five on the west side and eight on the east. All of these house are heavily decorated for the holidays with lights and figures. The proclamation for the fiftieth anniversary of Candy Cane Lane specifically recognized six residents of Summer Street who have lived there the entire fifty years. Borough mayor Lou Plankenhorn's proclamation officially declared the month of "December as Candy Cane Lane month forever more in DuBoistown".

Candy Cane Lane is a popular destination for sightseers between Thanksgiving and Epiphany. On Christmas Eve traffic backs up on Euclid Avenue as people wait to drive up the street. A visit to Candy Cane Lane is an important Christmas tradition for many area families. Even after Christmas, Summer Street is often referred to as "Candy Cane Lane" locally.

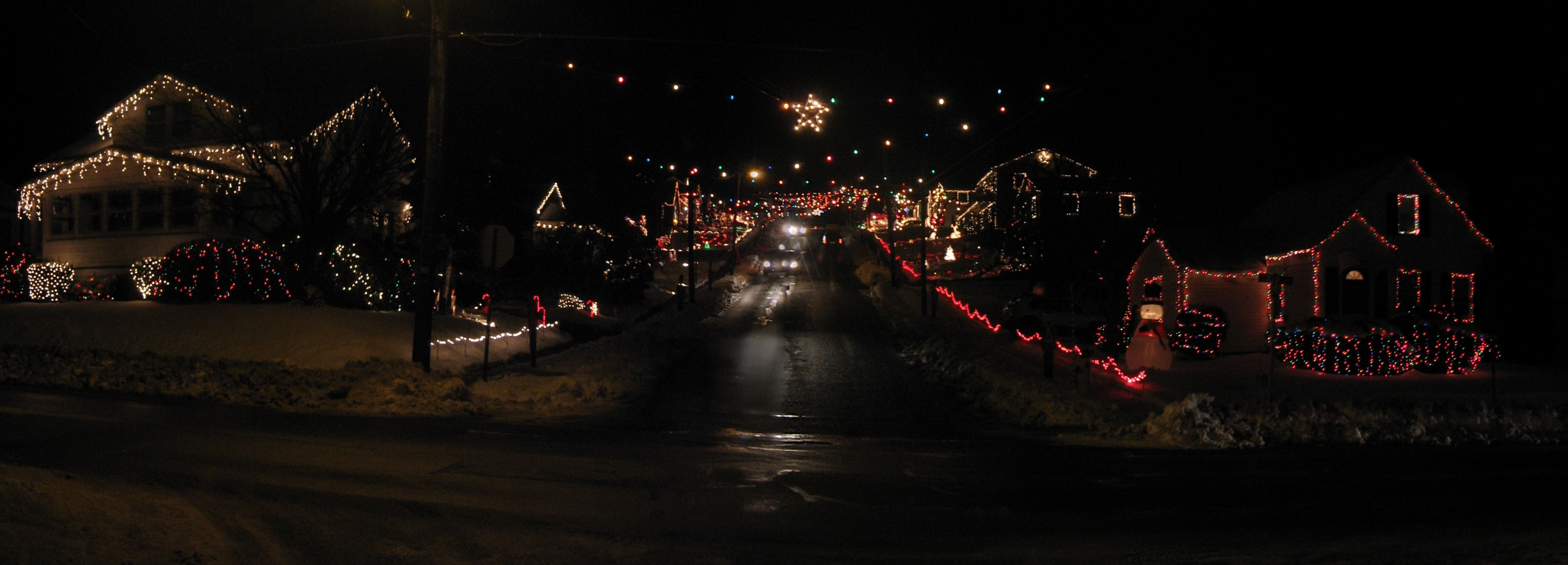
Panoramic view of Candy Cane Lane looking south (uphill) from Euclid Avenue in December 2008
