= Battle of Wauhatchie order of battle: Confederate =

The following units and commanders fought at the Battle of Wauhatchie of the American Civil War on the Confederate side. The Union order of battle is listed separately. Order of battle compiled from the army organization during the battle, and the reports.

== Abbreviations used ==
=== Military rank ===
- LTG = Lieutenant General
- BG = Brigadier General
- Col = Colonel
- Ltc = Lieutenant Colonel
- Maj = Major
- Cpt = Captain

=== Other ===
- (w) = wounded
- (mw) = mortally wounded
- (k) = killed in action

== Army of Tennessee ==
=== Longstreet's Corps ===
LTG James Longstreet

Division	Brigade	Regiments and Others
Hood's Division; BG Micah Jenkins	Jenkins' Brigade Col John Bratton	1st South Carolina: Col Franklin W. Kilpatrick (k); 2nd South Carolina Rifles: Col Thomas Thomson; 5th South Carolina: Col Asbury Coward; 6th South Carolina: Maj John M. White; Hampton's (South Carolina) Legion: Col Martin W. Gary; Palmetto (South Carolina) Sharpshooters: Col Joseph Walker
Hood's Division; BG Micah Jenkins	Robertson's Brigade BG Jerome B. Robertson	3rd Arkansas; 1st Texas; 4th Texas; 5th Texas
Hood's Division; BG Micah Jenkins	Law's Brigade BG Evander M. Law; Col James L. Sheffield	4th Alabama: Ltc Laurence H. Scruggs; 15th Alabama: Col William C. Oates (w); 44th Alabama: Col William F. Perry; 47th Alabama; 48th Alabama: Col James L. Sheffield, Cpt Thomas J. Eubanks (mw)
Hood's Division; BG Micah Jenkins	Benning's Brigade BG Henry L. Benning	2nd Georgia; 15th Georgia; 17th Georgia; 20th Georgia

== See also ==
- Chattanooga campaign order of battle: Confederate
