= Wauhatchie Pike =

- U.S. National Register of Historic Places
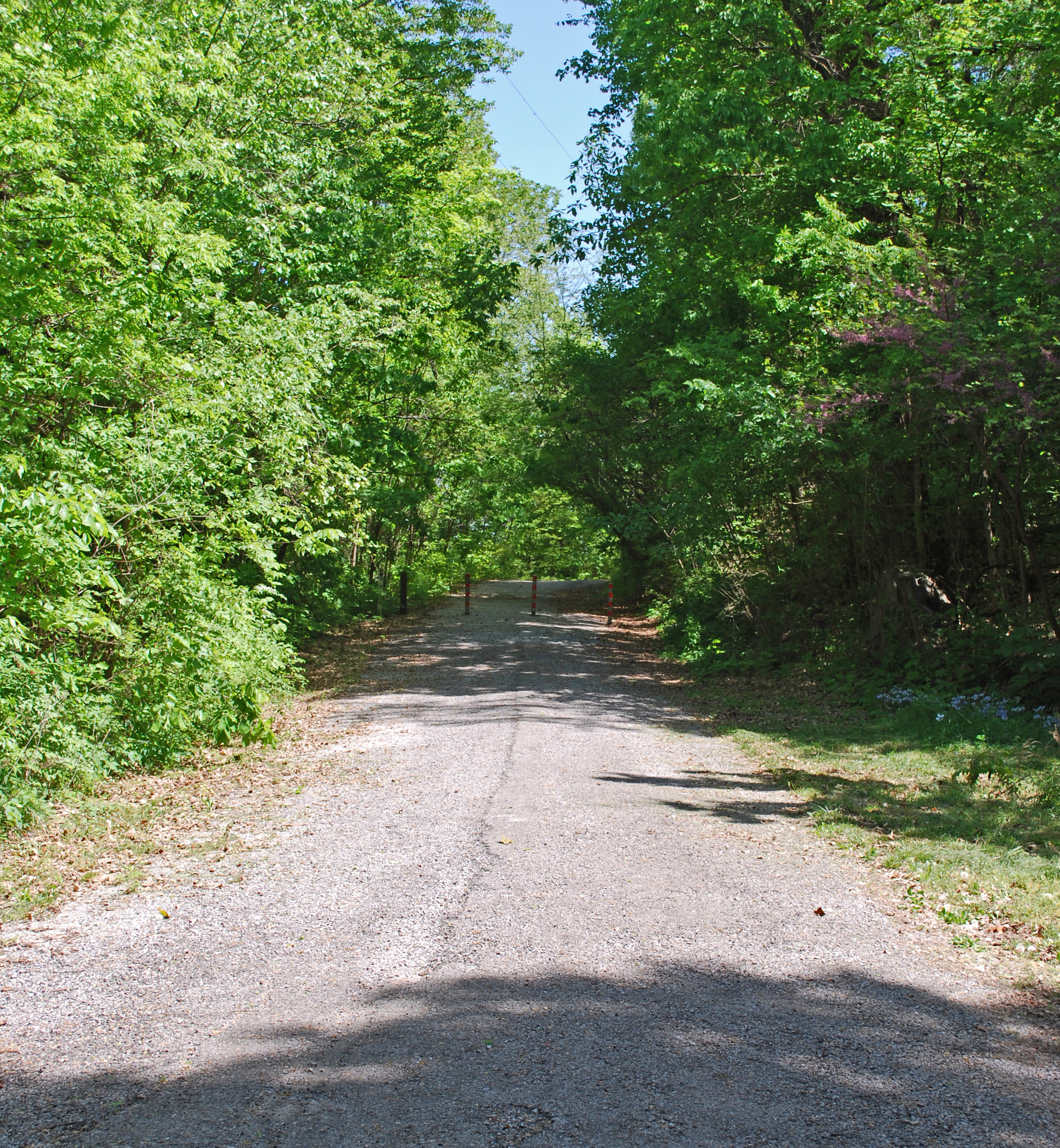

- Location within Tennessee
- Nearest city: Lookout Mountain, Tennessee
- Coordinates: 35°1′10″N 85°20′22″W
- Area: 1 acre (0.40 ha)
- Built: 1863
- MPS: Chickamauga-Chattanooga Civil War-Related Sites in Georgia and Tennessee MPS
- NRHP reference No.: 01000727
- Added to NRHP: July 11, 2001

The Wauhatchie Pike is a historic path in Lookout Mountain, Tennessee, U.S.. It was named after Wauhatchie, a Cherokee Nation chieftain. The path was an important location during the American Civil War of 1861–1865. It has been listed on the National Register of Historic Places since July 11, 2001.
