= Battle of Wauhatchie order of battle: Union =

The following Union Army units and commanders fought in the Battle of Wauhatchie of the American Civil War. The Confederate order of battle is listed separately. Order of battle compiled from the casualty returns and the reports.

== Abbreviations used ==
=== Military rank ===
- MG = Major General
- BG = Brigadier General
- Col = Colonel
- Ltc = Lieutenant Colonel
- Maj = Major
- Cpt = Captain
- Lt = Lieutenant

=== Other ===
- w = wounded
- mw = mortally wounded
- k = killed

== Hooker's Command ==
MG Joseph Hooker

- Chief of Staff: MG Daniel Butterfield

=== XI Corps ===
MG Oliver O. Howard

Division	Brigade	Regiments and Others
Second Division; BG Adolph von Steinwehr	1st Brigade Col Adolphus Buschbeck	134th New York; 154th New York; 27th Pennsylvania; 73rd Pennsylvania
Second Division; BG Adolph von Steinwehr	2nd Brigade Col Orland Smith	33rd Massachusetts: Col Adin B. Underwood (w), Ltc Godfrey Rider Jr.; 136th New York: Col James Wood; 55th Ohio; 73rd Ohio: Maj Samuel H. Hurst
Third Division; MG Carl Schurz	1st Brigade BG Hector Tyndale	101st Illinois; 45th New York; 143rd New York; 61st Ohio; 82nd Ohio
Third Division; MG Carl Schurz	2nd Brigade Col Wlodzimierz Krzyzanowski	58th New York; 119th New York; 141st New York; 26th Wisconsin
Third Division; MG Carl Schurz	3rd Brigade Col Friedrich Hecker	80th Illinois (6 companies); 68th New York; 75th Pennsylvania
	Cavalry	1st Alabama (part of one company); 5th Tennessee, Company G

=== XII Corps ===
Division	Brigade	Regiments and Others
Second Division; BG John W. Geary	2nd Brigade Col George A. Cobham, Jr.	29th Pennsylvania: Col William Rickards, Jr., Ltc Samuel M. Zulick; 109th Pennsylvania: Cpt Frederick L. Gimber; 111th Pennsylvania: Ltc Thomas M. Walker (w), Maj John A. Boyle (k)
Second Division; BG John W. Geary	3rd Brigade BG George S. Greene (w); Col David Ireland	78th New York: Ltc Herbert von Hammerstein; 137th New York: Col David Ireland, Ltc Koert S. Van Voorhees (w), Cpt Milo B. Eldredge; 149th New York: Ltc Charles B. Randall
	Artillery Brigade Maj John A. Reynolds	Battery E, Pennsylvania Light Artillery (2 sections): Cpt Charles A. Atwell (mw), Lt Edward R. Geary (mw)

== See also ==
- Chattanooga campaign order of battle: Union
