= Sheshequin Path =

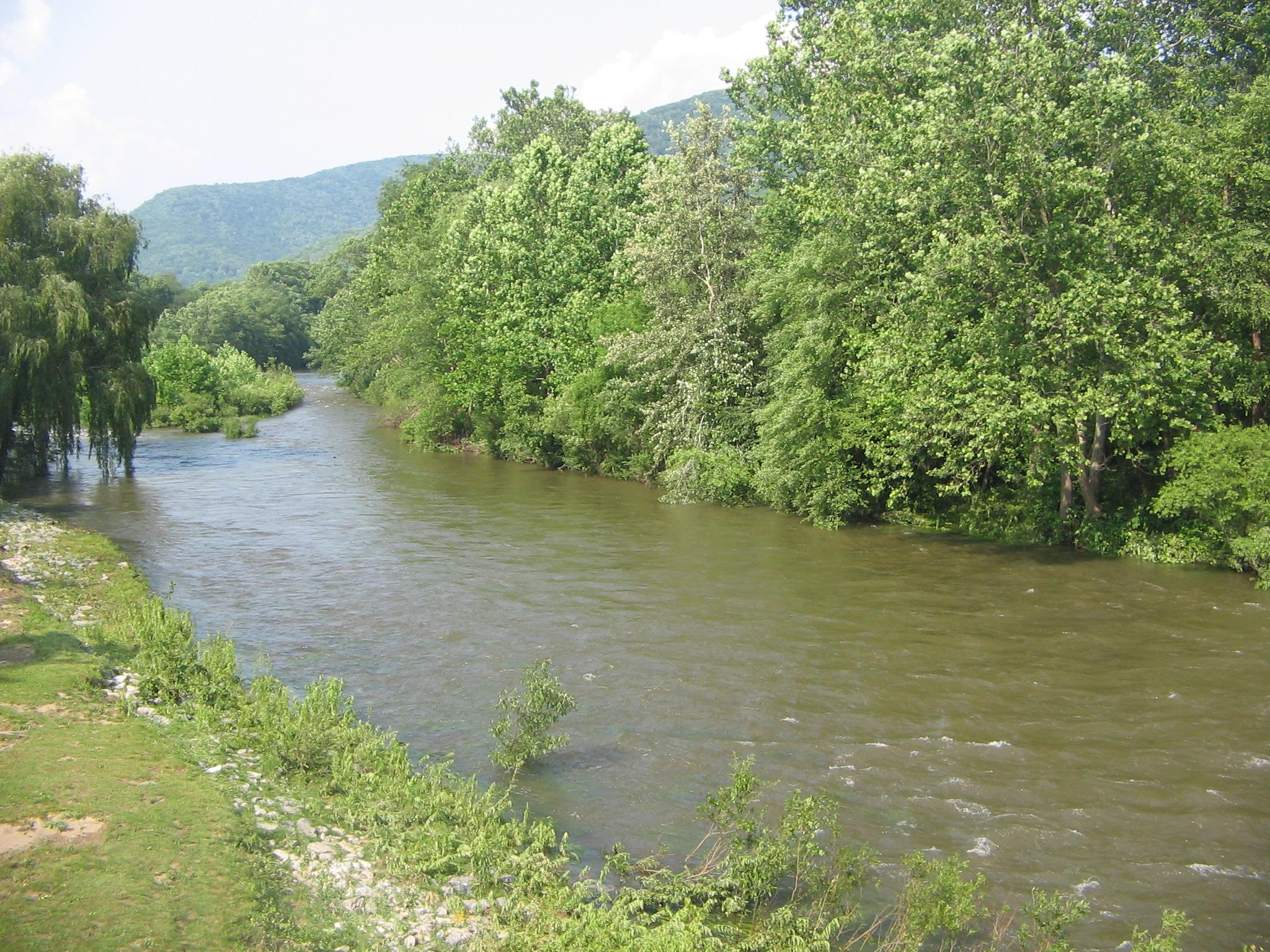
The Sheshequin Path ran along Lycoming Creek in Lycoming County.

The Sheshequin Path was a major Native American trail in the U.S. State of Pennsylvania that ran between two Native American villages: "French Margaret's Town" on the West Branch Susquehanna River (part of modern-day Williamsport in Lycoming County) and "Sheshequin" on the North Branch of the Susquehanna River (modern-day Ulster Township, in Bradford County). The path ran north and east along Lycoming Creek in Lycoming County and followed much of Towanda Creek in Bradford County. It was a shortcut between the two main branches of the Susquehanna River and was used by early settlers as well as Native Americans.

== Name ==
The name Sheshequin is a corruption of Sheshequanink meaning "at the place of the gourd rattle" in the Lenape language. The gourd rattle was used in religious ceremonies held there. Another name for the trail was the "Lycoming Path" for the creek it runs along for much of its length, which also gave its name to Lycoming County. Lycoming is a corruption of the Lenape Legaui-hanne or "sandy stream". A shortcut near Sheshequin which bypassed Towanda was known as "St. Joseph's Path", believed to be named for the Moravian Bishop August Gottlieb Spangenberg, who was also known as "Brother Joseph".

== Course ==
As was often the case with Native American trails, the Sheshequin Path split into multiple pathways at each end. In Lycoming County there were three branches that eventually led to Lycoming Creek. Each connected with the Great Shamokin Path that ran along the West Branch Susquehanna River south to the village of Shamokin (modern Sunbury) and west to the "Great Island" (at modern Lock Haven) and further west to Kittanning on the Allegheny River.

The east branch followed Loyalsock Creek north from its mouth at the village of "Otstonwakin" (modern Montoursville) to Wallis Run, north there, then west to Lycoming Creek along either Murray Run to the village of Fields Station, or that and Slacks Run to the village of Bodines. The middle branch was about one mile (0.6 km) west of Loyalsock Creek and ran north along Millers Run (Northway Road in Loyalsock Township), then followed Log Run or Mill Creek west to Lycoming Creek. The western main branch started at French Margaret's Town on the western side of Lycoming Creek, just north of its confluence with the river (today the Newberry section of Williamsport). This branch can be viewed as a continuation of Culbertson's Path, which crossed the river here.

The main branch of the Sheshequin Path followed Lycoming Creek north past the modern villages of Hepburnville, Cogan Station and Trout Run (the modern path of U.S. Route 15 and the future Interstate 99). From Trout Run it continues past Fields Station, Bodines, Marsh Hill, Ralston to the source of Lycoming Creek in the southwest corner of Bradford County. There the path traversed a swampy area for a short distance to the source of Towanda Creek near Grover, following Towanda Creek northeast to modern Canton (this is the route of Pennsylvania Route 14) and on to the village of East Canton. A short cut left the creek between Grover and East Canton. From East Canton the path followed the creek past Leroy, West Franklin, Powell, and Monroeton to the creek's mouth at modern Towanda on the North Branch Susuquehanna River. The path then followed the river north to Sheshequin (and from there north to modern New York and the Iroquois there). The alternate branch known as St. Joseph's Path left Towanda Creek at Powell, and ran north to Sugar Creek, which it either followed to the river and the village of Oscalui then north to Sheshequin, or crossed to go on to Sheshequin. Pennsylvania Route 414 follows the path from Canton to Monroeton, and U.S. Route 220 follows it to Towanda and north along the river to Sheshequin.

== History ==
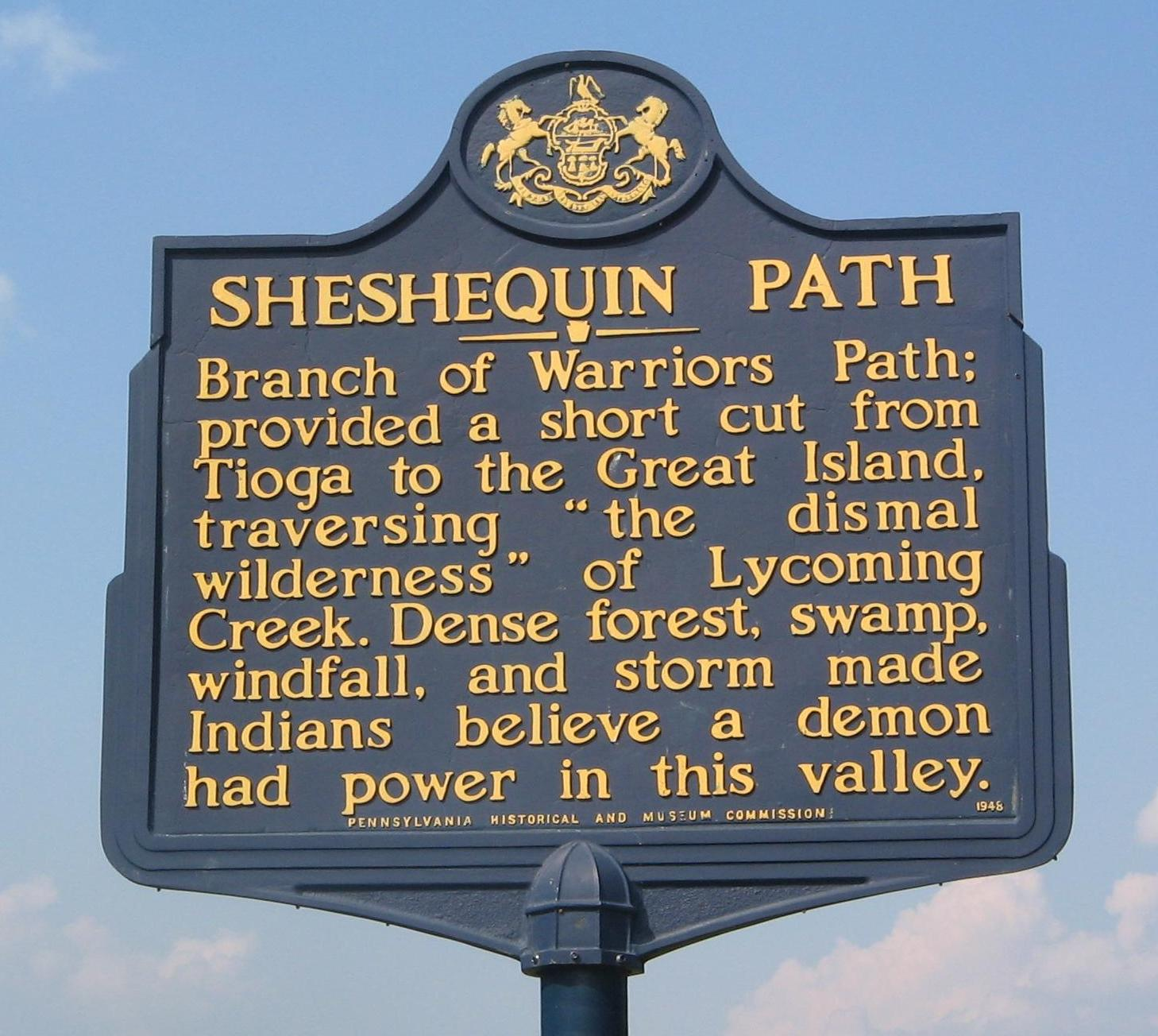
Sheshequin Path Pennsylvania Historical Marker on U.S. Route 15 near Trout Run

The Sheshequin Path had easy grades and was easy to follow (as it chiefly ran through two fairly narrow creek valleys). The narrow valleys made it difficult to avoid flooding, which could be a particular problem on Lycoming Creek. Bohemia Mountain at the headwaters of Lycoming Creek was said to be the residence of an "Otkan" or evil spirit because of the many thunderstorms and other bad weather there.

The Sheshequin Path was the one Conrad Weiser always used in his many journeys to meet with the Six Nations of the Iroquois, and his journal descriptions of his travels on it are a primary source of information about the path. For example, in March 1737 he travelled it with the Iroquois "vice chief" Shikellamy through snow up to three feet (1 m) deep on their way to Onondaga (modern Syracuse, New York). John Bartram and Lewis Evans travelled the Sheshequin path with Weiser in 1743.

In 1745, a party of Moravians, including Bishop Spangenberg and David Zeisberger, went north with Weiser along the trail. Spangenberg wrote of the Sheshequin Path as traversing a "Dismal Wilderness" which was "so full of wood and trees which the wind has piled up sometimes three to four logs upon one another that often one does not know how one may get through." He also wrote of it as "a wilderness where one does not see the sun all day long. The woods are so thickly grown that sometimes one can hardly see twenty paces ahead."

The Sheshequin Path was used by both sides in the American Revolutionary War. In 1778, after the Wyoming Valley battle and massacre, American Colonel Hartley led 200 men north along the Sheshequin Path on a retaliatory raid as far north as Queen Esther's Town (south of modern Athens, Pennsylvania at the confluence of the Chemung River and the Susquehanna), which they destroyed. Hartley's force then followed the river back south and fought a battle with Native Americans south of Wyalusing. This showed the practicality of raids using the native paths, leading to Sullivan's Expedition in 1779, which destroyed over 40 Native American villages.

The Sheshequin Path was used as a part of the Underground Railroad until the American Civil War began in 1861. Escaped slaves would often wade in creeks to hide their scent from pursuing bloodhounds.
