= National Register of Historic Places listings in Lycoming County, Pennsylvania =

Location of Lycoming County in Pennsylvania

This is a list of the National Register of Historic Places listings in Lycoming County, Pennsylvania.

This is intended to be a complete list of the properties and districts on the National Register of Historic Places in Lycoming County, Pennsylvania, United States. The locations of National Register properties and districts for which the latitude and longitude coordinates are included below, may be seen in a map.

There are 21 properties and districts listed on the National Register in the county.

This National Park Service list is complete through NPS recent listings posted May 1, 2026.

== Current listings ==
	Name on the Register	Image	Date listed	Location	City or town	Description
1	Archeological Site 36 LY 37	Archeological Site 36 LY 37	April 14, 1982 (#82003799)	Coextensive with Canfield Island; 41°14′32″N 76°57′11″W	Loyalsock Township	
2	Bridge in Brown Township	Bridge in Brown Township	June 22, 1988 (#88000844)	Legislative Route 41022 over Pine Creek; 41°29′43″N 77°29′51″W	Brown Township	
3	Bridge in Lewis Township	Bridge in Lewis Township	June 22, 1988 (#88000845)	Legislative Route 41051 over Lycoming Creek; 41°26′54″N 76°58′52″W	Lewis Township	Torn Down (Replaced)
4	Bridge in Porter Township	Bridge in Porter Township	June 22, 1988 (#88000842)	Legislative Route 41017 over Pine Creek; 41°10′51″N 77°16′43″W	Porter Township	
5	Buttonwood Covered Bridge	Buttonwood Covered Bridge	July 24, 1980 (#80003569)	Southwest of Liberty on Township 816; 41°30′35″N 77°07′50″W	Jackson Township	
6	Cogan House Covered Bridge	Cogan House Covered Bridge	July 24, 1980 (#80003567)	Southeast of White Pine on Township 784; 41°23′53″N 77°12′04″W	Cogan House Township	
7	English Center Suspension Bridge	English Center Suspension Bridge	December 14, 1978 (#78002428)	Over Pine Creek at English Center; 41°26′05″N 77°17′21″W	Pine Township	
8	Hart Building	Hart Building	September 7, 1984 (#84003490)	26–30 West 3rd Street; 41°14′27″N 77°00′08″W	Williamsport	
9	Peter Herdic House	Peter Herdic House	November 21, 1978 (#78002429)	407 4th Street; 41°14′23″N 77°00′33″W	Williamsport	
10	Houseknecht Farm	Houseknecht Farm	August 7, 2007 (#07000795)	812 J. Houseknecht Road; 41°10′41″N 76°38′53″W	Moreland Township	
11	Jersey Shore Historic District	Jersey Shore Historic District	March 31, 1975 (#75001653)	Irregular shape roughly bounded by Lawshe Run, West Branch Susquehanna River, southern borough boundaries, and Tomb Avenue; 41°12′04″N 77°15′18″W	Jersey Shore	
12	Lairdsville Covered Bridge	Lairdsville Covered Bridge	July 24, 1980 (#80003568)	West of Lairdsville on Township 664; 41°12′26″N 76°38′10″W	Moreland Township	
13	Lycoming Rubber Company	Lycoming Rubber Company	December 21, 2017 (#100001909)	1307 Park Ave. 41°14′35″N 77°02′00″W	Williamsport	
14	Millionaire's Row Historic District	Millionaire's Row Historic District	January 24, 1985 (#85000120)	Roughly bounded by Nichols Place, Elmira and West 3rd Streets, and 7th Avenue; 41°14′20″N 77°00′59″W	Williamsport	
15	Muncy Historic District	Muncy Historic District	July 3, 1980 (#80003570)	Roughly bounded by Ridell Lane, Sherman, Washington and Mechanic Streets; 41°12′13″N 76°47′07″W	Muncy	
16	Original Little League Field	Original Little League Field	December 3, 2014 (#14000996)	1695 W. 4th St. 41°14′27″N 77°02′41″W	Williamsport	
17	Reading-Halls Station Bridge	Reading-Halls Station Bridge	January 17, 1980 (#80003571)	Northwest of Muncy off U.S. Route 220; 41°14′09″N 76°49′58″W	Muncy Township	
18	St. James Episcopal Church	St. James Episcopal Church	November 20, 1979 (#79002294)	215 South Main Street; 41°12′05″N 76°47′09″W	Muncy	
19	U.S. Post Office	U.S. Post Office	March 16, 1972 (#72001135)	245 W. 4th St. 41°14′24″N 77°00′23″W	Williamsport	
20	Williamsport Armory	Williamsport Armory	November 14, 1991 (#91001704)	1300 Penn Street; 41°15′15″N 76°59′34″W	Williamsport	
21	Williamsport City Hall	Williamsport City Hall	November 7, 1976 (#76001648)	454 Pine St. 41°14′33″N 77°00′15″W	Williamsport	

== Former listing ==
	Name on the Register	Image	Date listed	Date removed	Location	City or town	Description
1	Lycoming County Courthouse	Lycoming County Courthouse	April 16, 1969 (#74002331)	October 24, 1974	Pine and W. 3rd Sts.	Williamsport	Demolished on May 15, 1969.
2	Bridge in Plunketts Creek Township	Bridge in Plunketts Creek Township	June 22, 1988 (#88000830)	July 22, 2002	Legislative Route 41053 over Plunketts Creek; 41°24′32″N 76°48′10″W	Plunketts Creek Township	Damaged in a flood on January 21, 1996 and eventually demolished.

== See also ==
- List of National Historic Landmarks in Pennsylvania
- National Register of Historic Places listings in Pennsylvania
- List of Pennsylvania state historical markers in Lycoming County
