= List of Pennsylvania state historical markers in Lycoming County =

Location of Lycoming County in Pennsylvania

This is a list of the Pennsylvania state historical markers in Lycoming County.

This is intended to be a complete list of the official state historical markers placed in Lycoming County, Pennsylvania by the Pennsylvania Historical and Museum Commission (PHMC). The locations of the historical markers, as well as the latitude and longitude coordinates as provided by the PHMC's database, are included below when available. There are 30 historical markers located in Lycoming County.

== Historical markers ==
Marker title	Image	Date dedicated	Location	Marker type	Topics
Antes Fort - PLAQUE		June 8, 1917	PA44, 1 mi. E of Jersey Shore; 41.1988°N 77.236°W	Plaque	American Revolution, Forts, Military, Native American
Blooming Grove Dunkard Meeting House - PLAQUE		August 1, 1931	Meetinghouse, 2 miles E of Balls Mills, .7 mile S of PA 973; 41.324°N 77.0042°W	Plaque	Buildings, Ethnic & Immigration, Religion
Bowman Field		July 29, 2000	1700 West Fourth St., Williamsport; 41.2417°N 77.0471°W	Roadside	African American, Baseball, Sports
Capt. John Brady		May 28, 1947	SR 2014 (old Pa. 147), .8 mile N of Muncy; 41.2182°N 76.7881°W	Roadside	American Revolution, Military, Native American
Carl E. Stotz		October 10, 1995	Original Little League Field, W. 4th St., Williamsport; 41.2407°N 77.0444°W	Roadside	Baseball, Sports
Civilian Conservation Corps		September 28, 1996	Rt. 14 N of Trout Run; 41.3709°N 77.0714°W	Roadside	Environment, Government & Politics, Government & Politics 20th Century, Labor
Dietrick Lamade		November 23, 1996	W. 3rd. & Williams Sts., Williamsport; 41.2396°N 77.0042°W	City	Business & Industry, Ethnic & Immigration, Publishing
Eagle Grange No. 1		May 5, 2001	Rte. 15 and E. Blind Road, Montgomery; 41.1788°N 76.9111°W	Roadside	Agriculture, Business & Industry, Government & Politics, Railroads, Women
Fort Antes		May 1, 1947	Main & Seminary Sts., Jersey Shore; 41.204°N 77.2532°W	Roadside	American Revolution, Forts, Military, Mills, Native American
Fort Muncy		June 4, 1946	U.S. 220, 3.5 miles N of Muncy (Missing)	Roadside	American Revolution, Forts, Military
Freedom Road Cemetery		May 15, 1993	T-456 in Loyalsock Twp. 41.2622°N 77.0102°W	Roadside	African American, Civil War, Religion, Underground Railroad
Julia C. Collins (? - 1865)		June 19, 2010	Susq. River Walk & Timber Heritage Trail, near Market St. Bridge, Williamsport; 41.2358°N 77.0045°W	Roadside	African American, Education, Women, Writers
Lycoming County		April 13, 1981	Lycoming County Courthouse, Williamsport; 41.2407°N 77.0021°W	City	Baseball, Business & Industry, Cities & Towns, Government & Politics, Native American, Sports
Muncy		January 21, 1952	40 N Main St., Muncy; 41.215°N 76.2361°W	Roadside	Cities & Towns, Native American, Paths & Trails
Muncy		January 21, 1952	260 E Water St., Muncy; 41.2093°N 76.77494°W	Roadside	Cities & Towns, Native American, Paths & Trails
Muncy Mills		May 28, 1947	Junction Pa. 405 & 442 E of Muncy; 41.2117°N 76.7581°W	Roadside	Business & Industry, Mills, Native American
Pennsdale Meeting		May 1, 1947	Junction SR 2051 (former LR 41054) & township road (former LR 41154) near Pennsdale; 41.2432°N 76.7979°W	Roadside	Buildings, Religion
Pennsdale Meeting		July 19, 1946	Junction LR 41154 & LR 41054 near Pennsdale (Missing)	Roadside	Religion
Pennsylvania Canal - Clinton County - (West Branch Division)		July 9, 1952	In Lockport, Clinton County, Pa. At the junction of 664 (Swissdale Rd.) and Locks Ave. (Latitude/Longitude: 41.13694, -77.44722)	Roadside	Canals, Navigation, Transportation
Peter Herdic		November 7, 1996	407 W. 4th St., Williamsport; 41.24°N 77.009°W	City	Buildings, Business & Industry, Entrepreneurs, Invention, Professions & Vocations
Pine Creek Presbyterian Church		February 25, 1949	Allegheny St. (SR 3028 / old US 220), Jersey Shore; 41.2042°N 77.2659°W	Roadside	Religion
Sheshequin Path		March 1, 1949	U.S. 15, 2.2 miles S of Trout Run; 41.3707°N 77.0717°W	Roadside	Environment, Native American, Paths & Trails, Transportation
Sheshequin Path		March 1, 1949	Pa. 14, 1.4 mile NE of Trout Run (Missing); 41.4019°N 77.0454°W	Roadside	Early Settlement, Native American, Paths & Trails, Transportation
Sheshequin Path		March 1, 1949	Pa. 14 at Marsh Hill; 41.4237°N 77.0178°W	Roadside	Early Settlement, Paths & Trails, Transportation
Susquehanna Log Boom		December 19, 1962	US 15, just S of Williamsport; 41.22776°N 76.98532°W	Roadside	Business & Industry
W. D. Crooks & Sons Door Plant		October 26, 2000	One College Ave. Williamsport, outside the Alvin Bush Campus Center; 41.2352°N 77.0232°W	Roadside	Business & Industry
Williamson Road		May 1, 1947	Main St. (US 15), Trout Run; 41.2862°N 77.0559°W	Roadside	Early Settlement, Roads, Transportation
Williamsport		May 1, 1947	U.S. 220 E at Williamsport; 41.2538°N 76.9816°W	Roadside	Business & Industry, Cities & Towns, Government & Politics
Williamsport		May 1, 1947	US 15 at LLWS, S end of Williamsport; 41.22806°N 76.98387°W	Roadside	Business & Industry, Cities & Towns, Transportation
Williamsport		May 1, 1947	U.S. 220 W of Williamsport (Missing)	Roadside	Business & Industry, Cities & Towns, Transportation

== See also ==
- List of Pennsylvania state historical markers
- National Register of Historic Places listings in Lycoming County, Pennsylvania
