= Penn Tower =

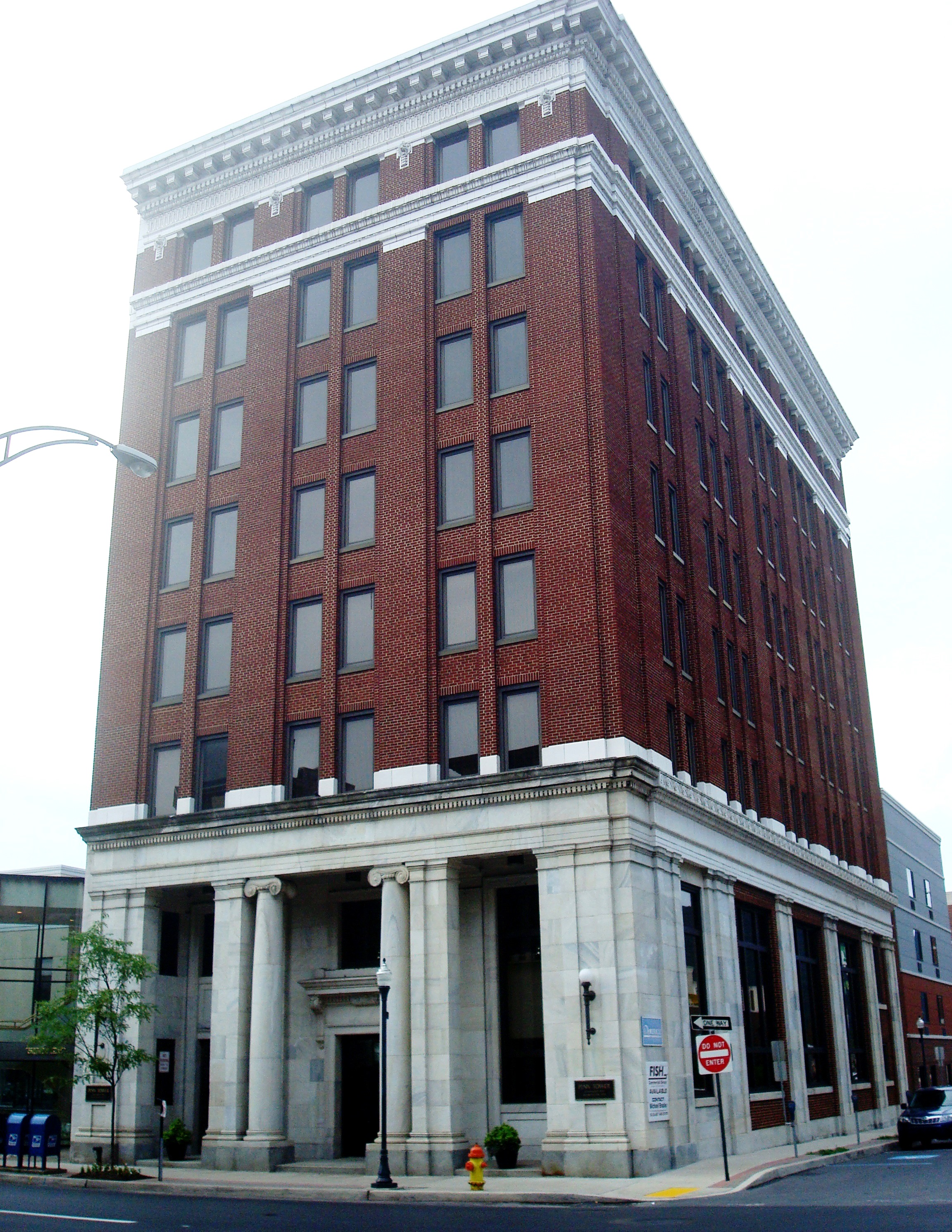
- Former names: Fidelity National Bank Building

General information
- Status: Operational
- Location: 25 West Third Street, Williamsport, PA, 17701, Williamsport, Pennsylvania, United States
- Coordinates: 41.2410°N 77.0056°W
- Opened: 1913
- Renovated: 1987
- Height: 97 feet

Technical details
- Floor count: 9 (One below ground)
- Lifts/elevators: 2

Website
- Website

First National Bank Building commonly referred to as Penn Tower is a low-rise commercial building located in downtown Williamsport, Pennsylvania. It was built in 1913 and at the time it was the tallest in the city.

== History ==
Penn Tower was built in 1913 and upon completion was the tallest building in the city. Through the year the building was converted from a factory to apartments to commercial space and is now a commercial building.

== Design ==
The building's structural system is made of steel and the facade is brick in an applied masonry system.

== See also ==
- Genetti Hotel
