= Community Arts Center =

Performing arts center in Williamsport, Pennsylvania

Journey Bank Community Arts Center
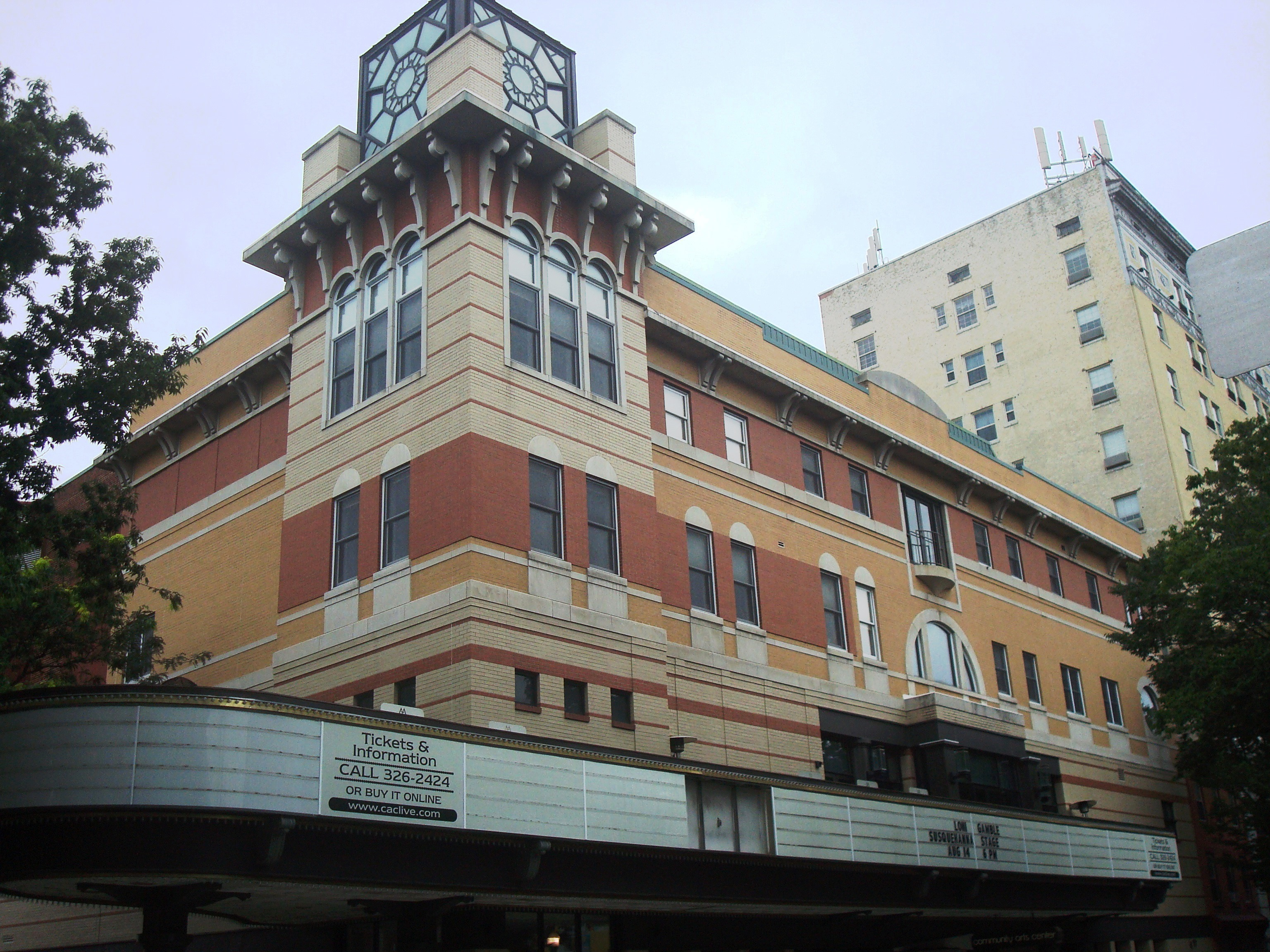
- Interactive map of Journey Bank Community Arts Center
- Address: 220 West 4th Street; Williamsport, PA 17701
- Coordinates: 41.2408943°N 77.0060195°W
- Seating type: Reserved seating
- Capacity: 2,078

Construction
- Opened: 1928
- Reopened: 1993

Website
- www.caclive.com

The Journey Bank Community Arts Center is a 2,078-seat performing arts center located in Williamsport, Pennsylvania, next to the Genetti Hotel. Originally a movie palace, it opened in 1928 as the Capitol Theatre. It reopened after restoration in 1993 as the Community Arts Center. The Journey Bank Community Arts Center has hosted entertainers such as Grand Funk Railroad, The Beach Boys, Jay Leno, Kansas, Lou Gramm, Styx, Lynyrd Skynyrd, Weird Al Yankovic, and Ted Nugent.
