= Old City Hall (Williamsport, Pennsylvania) =

- Williamsport City Hall
- U.S. National Register of Historic Places
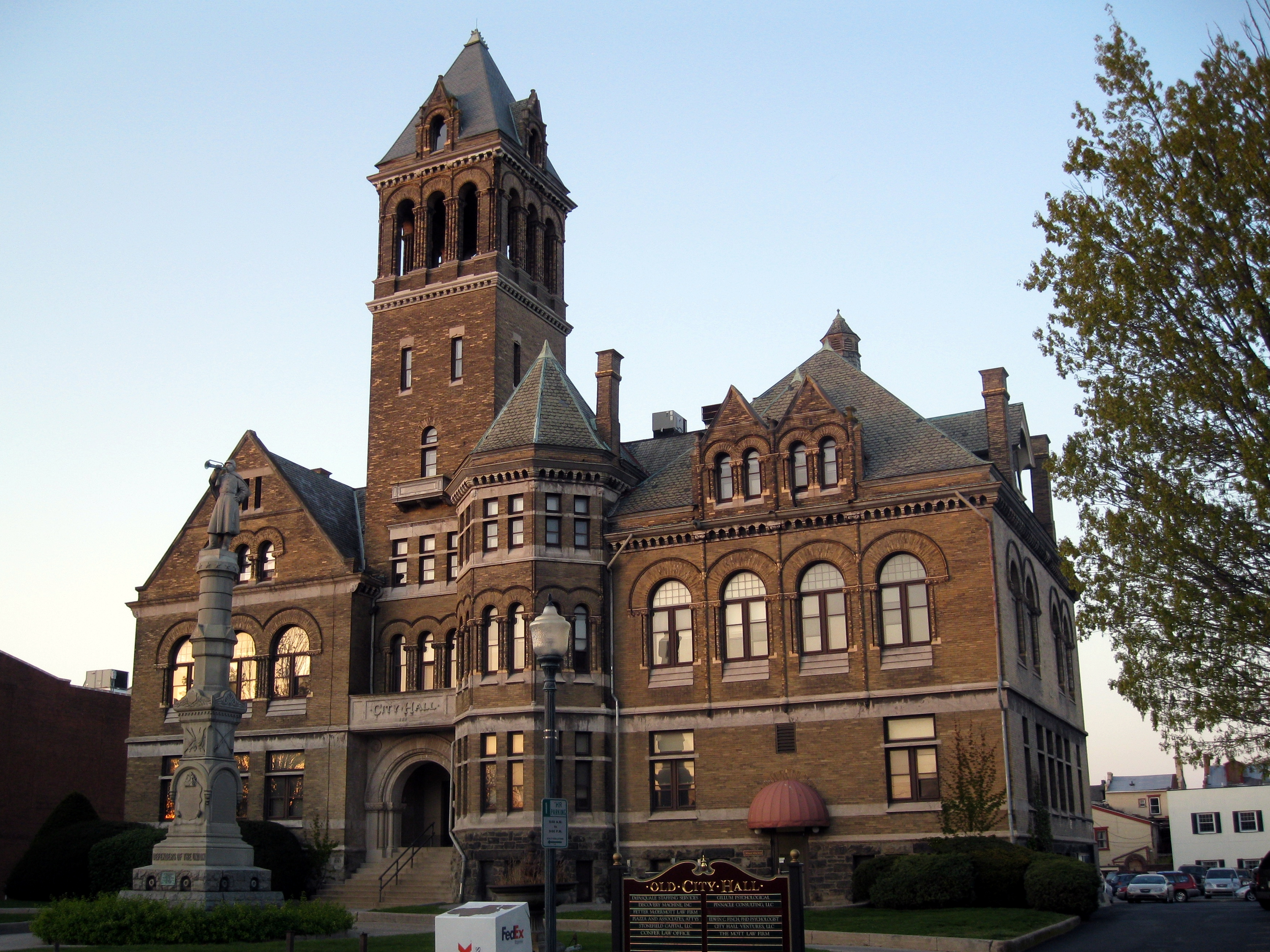
- (April 2011)

- Location within Pennsylvania Location within the United States
- Location: 454 Pine Street, Williamsport, Pennsylvania
- Coordinates: 41°14′33″N 77°0′15″W
- Built: 1894
- Architect: Eber Culver of Culver & Hudson
- Architectural style: Late Victorian, Romanesque
- NRHP reference No.: 76001648
- Added to NRHP: November 7, 1976

The Old City Hall is an historic city hall in Williamsport, Pennsylvania, United States.

It was added to the National Register of Historic Places in 1976 as the Williamsport City Hall.

== History and architectural features ==
Built in 1894, this historic structure is a four-story building that was made from yellow brick trimmed in stone, with molded brick ornamentation and terra cotta columns. It was designed in an eclectic Late Victorian/Romanesque Revival style, and features a large rectangular tower and a smaller octagonal tower.

== See also ==
- United States Post Office (Williamsport, Pennsylvania) – the current City Hall
- National Register of Historic Places listings in Lycoming County, Pennsylvania
