= Williamsport Armory =

- U.S. National Register of Historic Places
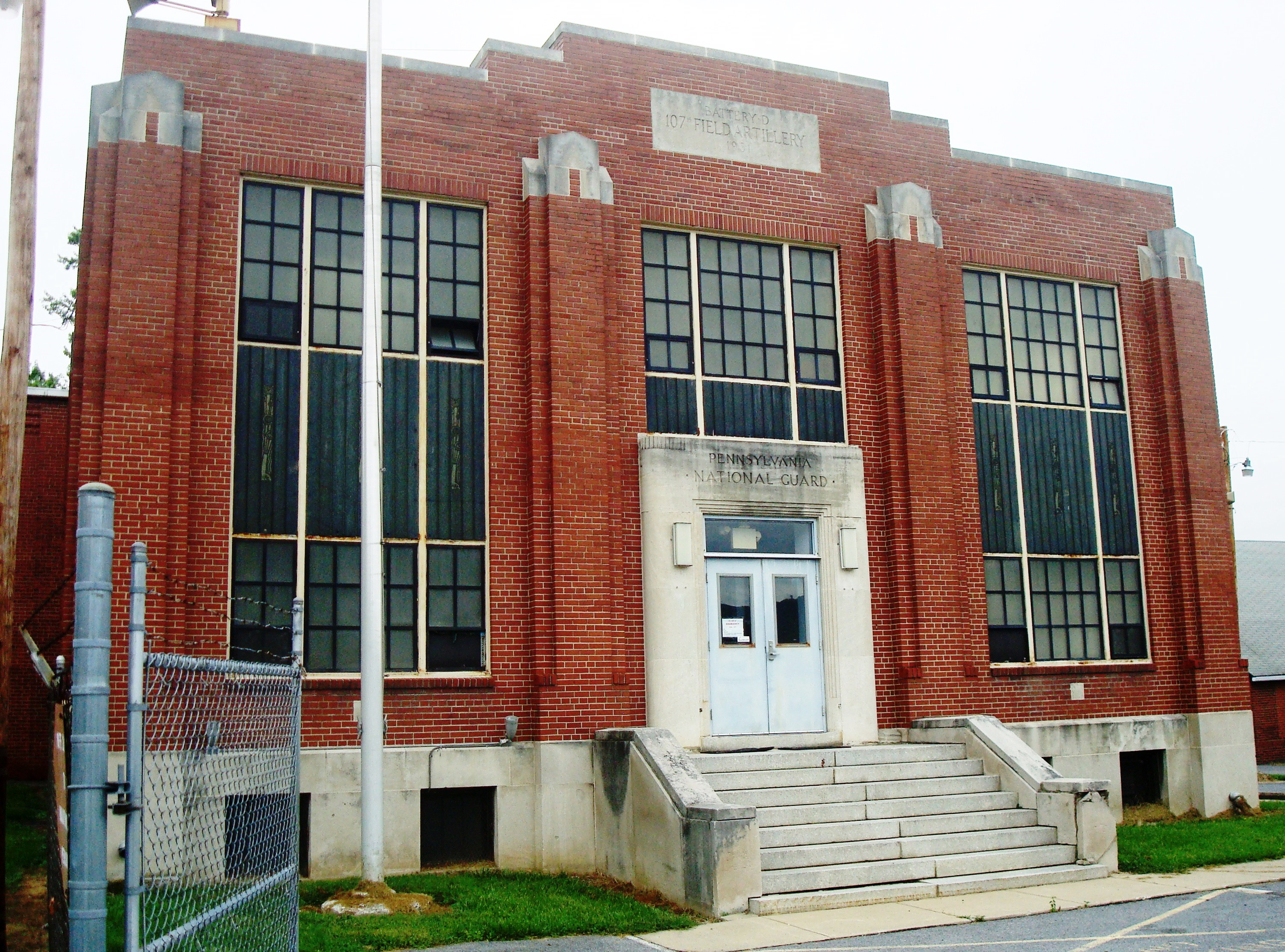
- (2014)

- Location within Pennsylvania Location within the United States
- Location: 1300 Penn Street; Williamsport, Pennsylvania
- Coordinates: 41°15′15″N 76°59′34″W
- Area: 15.9 acres (6.4 ha)
- Built: 1927, 1930, 1937
- Architect: Philip H. Johnson; Davis & Rice
- Architectural style: Art Deco
- MPS: Pennsylvania National Guard Armories MPS
- NRHP reference No.: 91001704
- Added to NRHP: November 14, 1991

The Williamsport Armory is an historic National Guard armory complex that is located at 1300 Penn Street in Williamsport, Pennsylvania.

It was added to the National Register of Historic Places in 1991.

== History and architectural features ==
This complex consists of a main armory building and separate auxiliary building. The main armory building has a two-story, brick administration section that was designed in the Art Deco style, with an attached drill hall, taking a T-shaped plan. The drill hall was built in 1937. The auxiliary building was built in 1927. It consists of a 1 1/2-story stable with an attached one-story gun shed.

== See also ==
- National Register of Historic Places listings in Lycoming County, Pennsylvania
