= Ada Dow Currier =

American actress

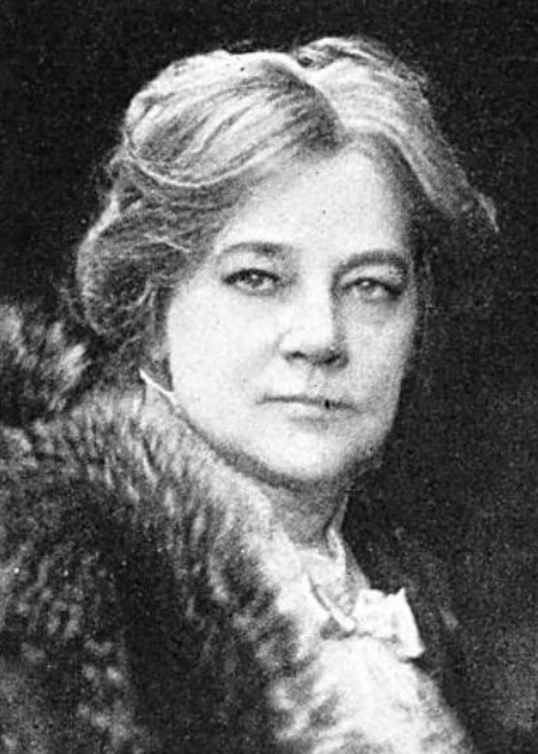
- Ada Dow Currier, from a 1926 publication
- Born: Ada Dow; October 1852; Philadelphia, Pennsylvania
- Died: May 19, 1926 aged 73; New York City
- Occupations: Actress, dramatic coach, theatrical director and producer
- Spouse: Frank Currier

Ada M. Dow Currier (October 1852- May 19, 1926) was an American stage actress, theatrical director, producer, and drama coach.

== Early life and education ==
Ada Dow was born in Philadelphia and raised in Cincinnati, Ohio, the daughter of Anthony William Georges Dow and Dorothy Dow. Both of her parents were born in England. She began acting in her youth, in the company of Joseph Jefferson.

== Career ==
Dow was a stage actress, and worked with her brother-in-law Robert J. Miles in directing and producing shows. Between 1898 and 1905, she and Janet Waldorf led repertory companies on three tours through Asia, Australia and New Zealand, performing Shakespeare plays. She was working in San Francisco when the 1906 San Francisco earthquake struck, destroying many of her belongings.

Dow was best known for coaching young actors. Among her acting students were Maude Adams, Marie Cahill, Ruth Blair, Agatha Bârcescu, Olivia Kelsey, Isabel Garland Lord, and, most notably, Julia Marlowe. "Miss Dow believed in the complete development of the body, the voice, and the deportment, as well as in the most exhaustive study of great plays," explained Marlowe. "I was never allowed to memorize a line of my part till I understood the play completely as a whole."

Dow advocated for expanding women's roles in theatrical production, and for public funding for the arts. "I have no patience with people who go around preaching the doctrine that art thrives on starvation," she said in a 1915 interview. "It does not."

== Personal life ==
Ada Dow married actor Frank Currier. They lived separately from 1896, and attempted to divorce, but they were still married when she died in 1926, in her late sixties, at her home in New York City.
