= Ruth Blair (actress) =

American actress (1891–1957)

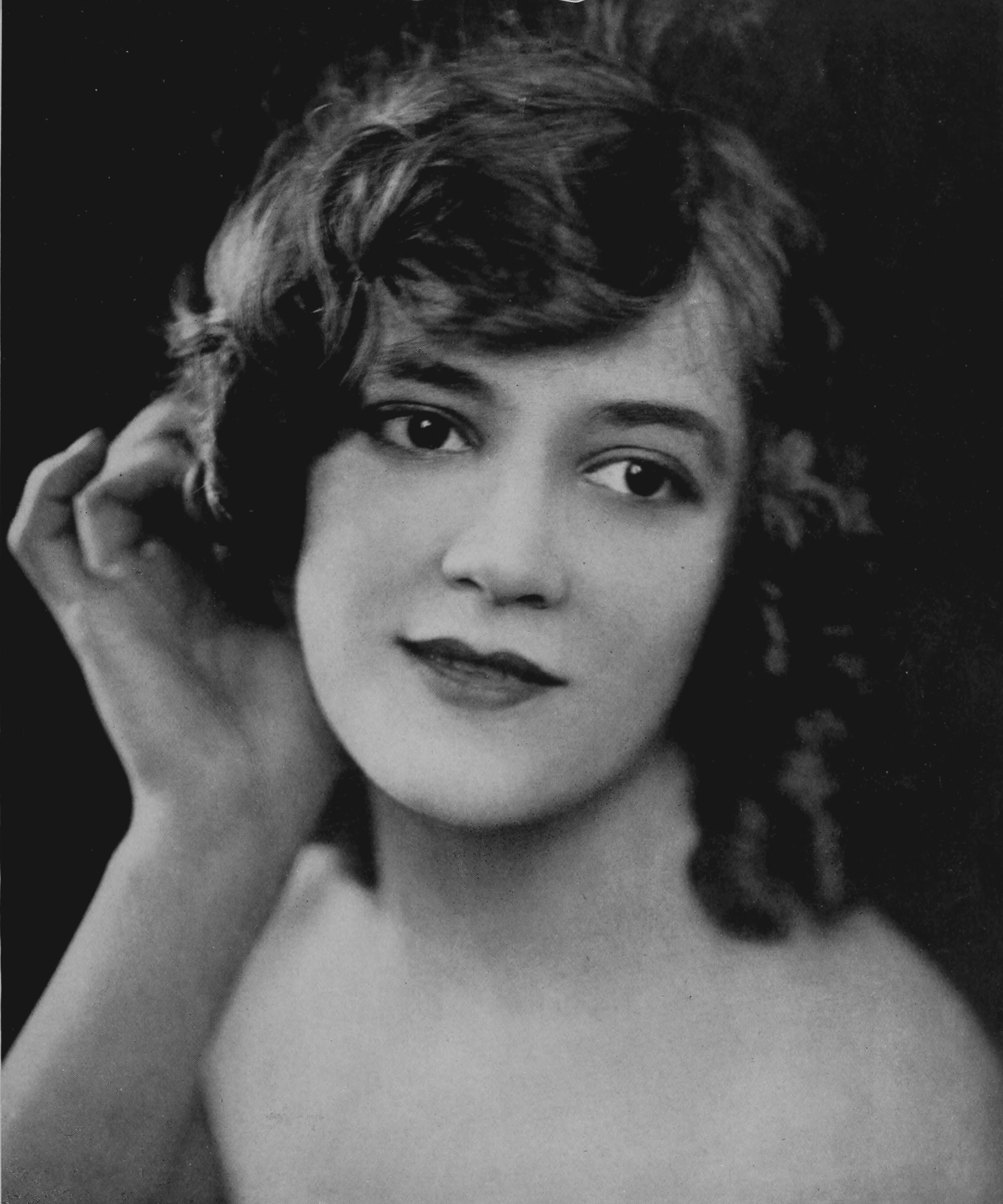
- Ruth Blair, from a 1916 publication
- Born: Ruth Naomi Powell; July 13, 1891; Williamsport, Pennsylvania, U.S.
- Died: February 24, 1957 (aged 65); Fresno, California, U.S.
- Occupation: Actress
- Years active: 1915–1916

Ruth Blair (July 13, 1891 – February 24, 1957), born Ruth Naomi Powell, was an American actress in silent films made in 1915 and 1916.

== Early life and education ==
Ruth Naomi Powell was born on July 13, 1891, in Williamsport, Pennsylvania. Her mother died when Ruth was 12 years old. Her New York drama coach Ada Dow Currier considered her "another Julia Marlowe".

== Career ==
In 1915, Blair won a nationwide talent search and signed a three-year contract with Smallwood Film Corporation to star in comedies. She appeared in the silent films The Law of Nature (1915), Canned Curiosity (1915), His Wife's Past (1915), Pyramid Pictures (1915), The Fourth Estate (1916), His Promise (1916), and The Folly of Fear (1916).

Blair was considered pretty and stylish, a "'perfect Parisian thirty-six' of the hipless, small-busted style so much admired these days both on the screen and before the footlights." She designed her own clothes and enjoyed outdoor recreation, especially riding and photography. She modeled Easter hats for Photoplay magazine in 1916, and she was featured on the cover of Motography magazine in January 1916.

== Personal life ==
Although she was always referred to as "Miss Blair" in publicity, Powell was married to a dental technician, Charles Harrison Blair, in 1909. They had four children, two sons born before her brief film career, and two daughters, born after. Blair died on February 24, 1957, aged 65, in Fresno, California.
