= Hart Building (Williamsport, Pennsylvania) =

- U.S. National Register of Historic Places
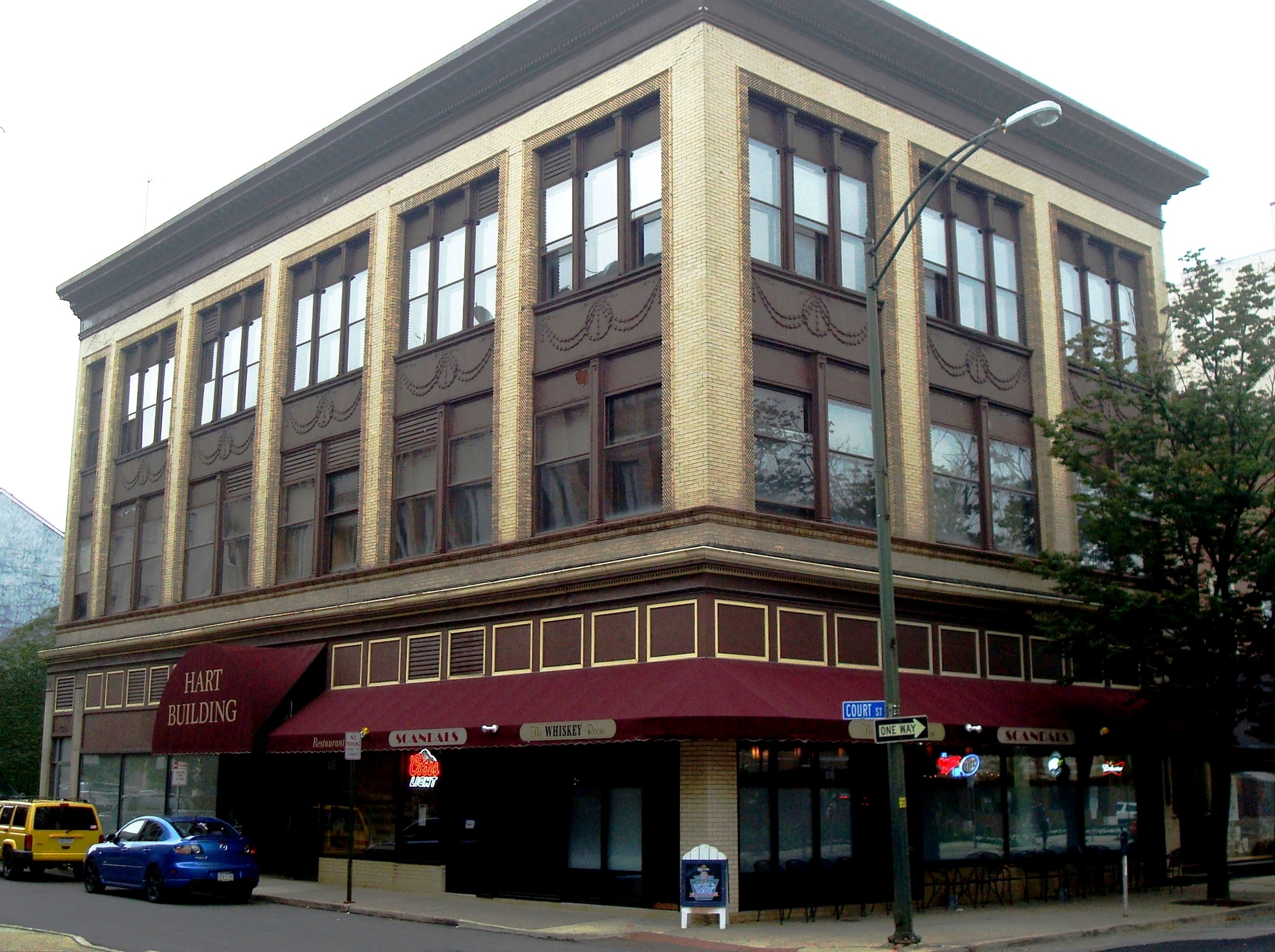
- (2014)

- Location within Pennsylvania Location within the United States
- Location: 26-30 West 3rd Street at Court Street; Williamsport, Pennsylvania
- Coordinates: 41°14′27″N 77°0′8″W
- Built: 1895
- Architect: Amos S. Wagner
- NRHP reference No.: 84003490
- Added to NRHP: September 7, 1984

The Hart Building is an historic commercial building which is located at 26-30 West 3rd Street at the corner of Court Street in Williamsport, Pennsylvania.

The building was added to the National Register of Historic Places in 1984.

== History and architectural features ==
Built in 1895, this historic structure is a three-story, steel frame building, which measures approximately 80 by 50 feet (24 by 15 m). Exterior decorative elements include pressed brickwork, terra cotta, carved stone, wood window sash and frame, and pressed metal cornice and window trim. It was designed by noted Williamsport architect Amos S. Wagner.

== See also ==
- National Register of Historic Places listings in Lycoming County, Pennsylvania
