= City Hall (Williamsport, Pennsylvania) =

- U.S. Post Office
- U.S. National Register of Historic Places
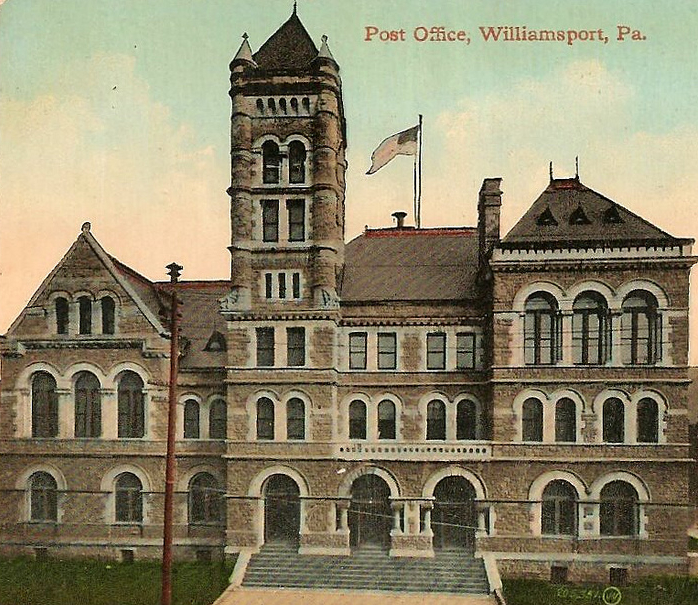
- (prior to 1921)

- Location within Pennsylvania Location within the United States
- Location: 245 West 4th Street, Williamsport, Pennsylvania
- Coordinates: 41°14′24″N 77°0′23″W
- Built: 1888-1891
- Architect: William A. Freret
- NRHP reference No.: 72001135
- Added to NRHP: March 16, 1972

Williamsport City Hall, formerly the United States Post Office, is a historic building located at 245 West 4th Street between Government Place and West Street in Williamsport, Pennsylvania. It was built between 1888 and 1891, and is a 2 1/2 to 3-story building, with a two-story addition and six-story tower. The exterior is faced with rough-faced gray limestone ashlar. It was designed by the Office of the Supervising Architect under the direction of William A. Freret.

The building was added to the National Register of Historic Places in 1972 as a post office.

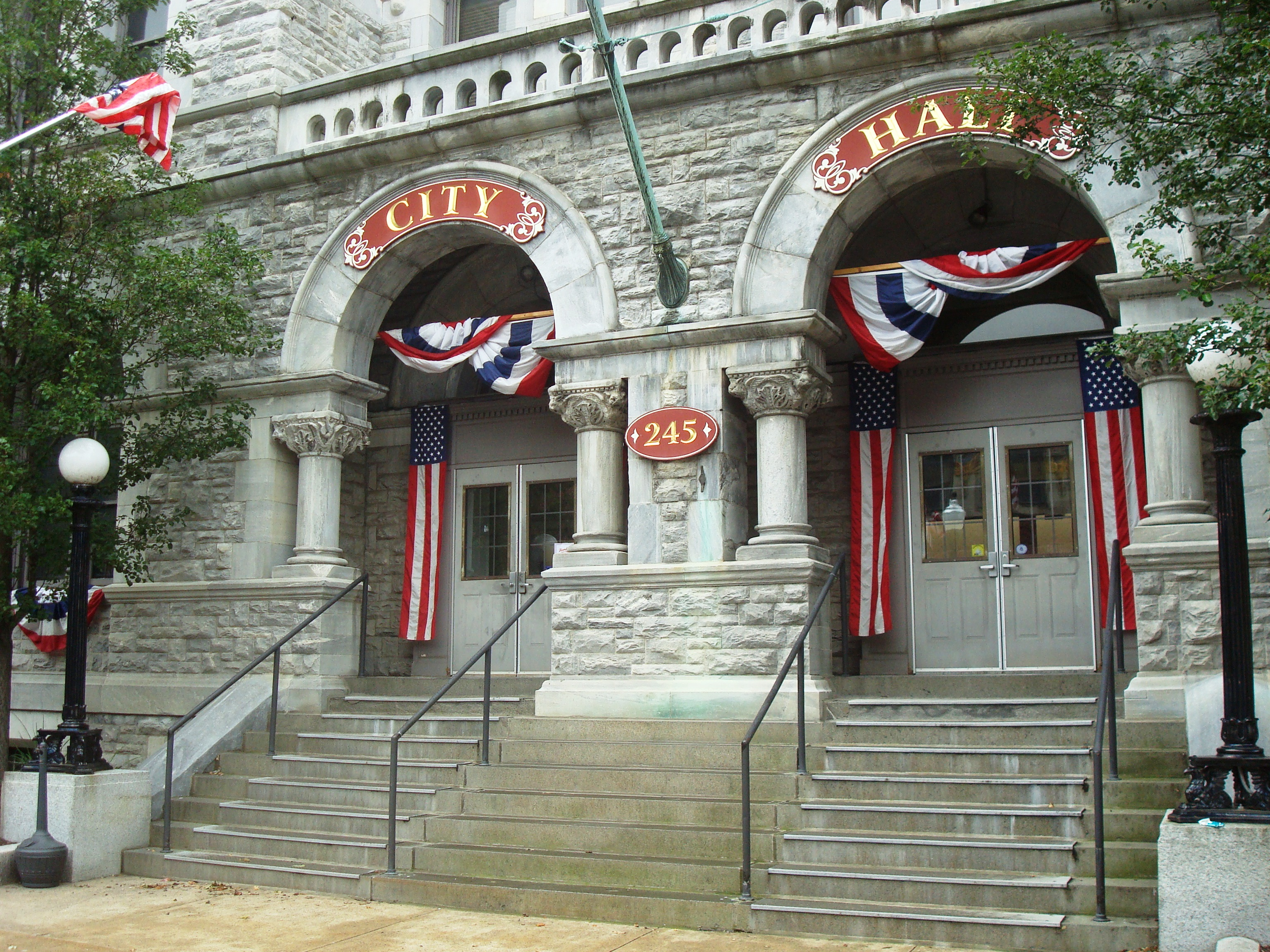
The entrance to City Hall (2014)

== See also ==
- Old City Hall (Williamsport, Pennsylvania)
- National Register of Historic Places listings in Lycoming County, Pennsylvania
