= St. James Episcopal Church (Muncy, Pennsylvania) =

Historic church in Pennsylvania, United States

- U.S. National Register of Historic Places
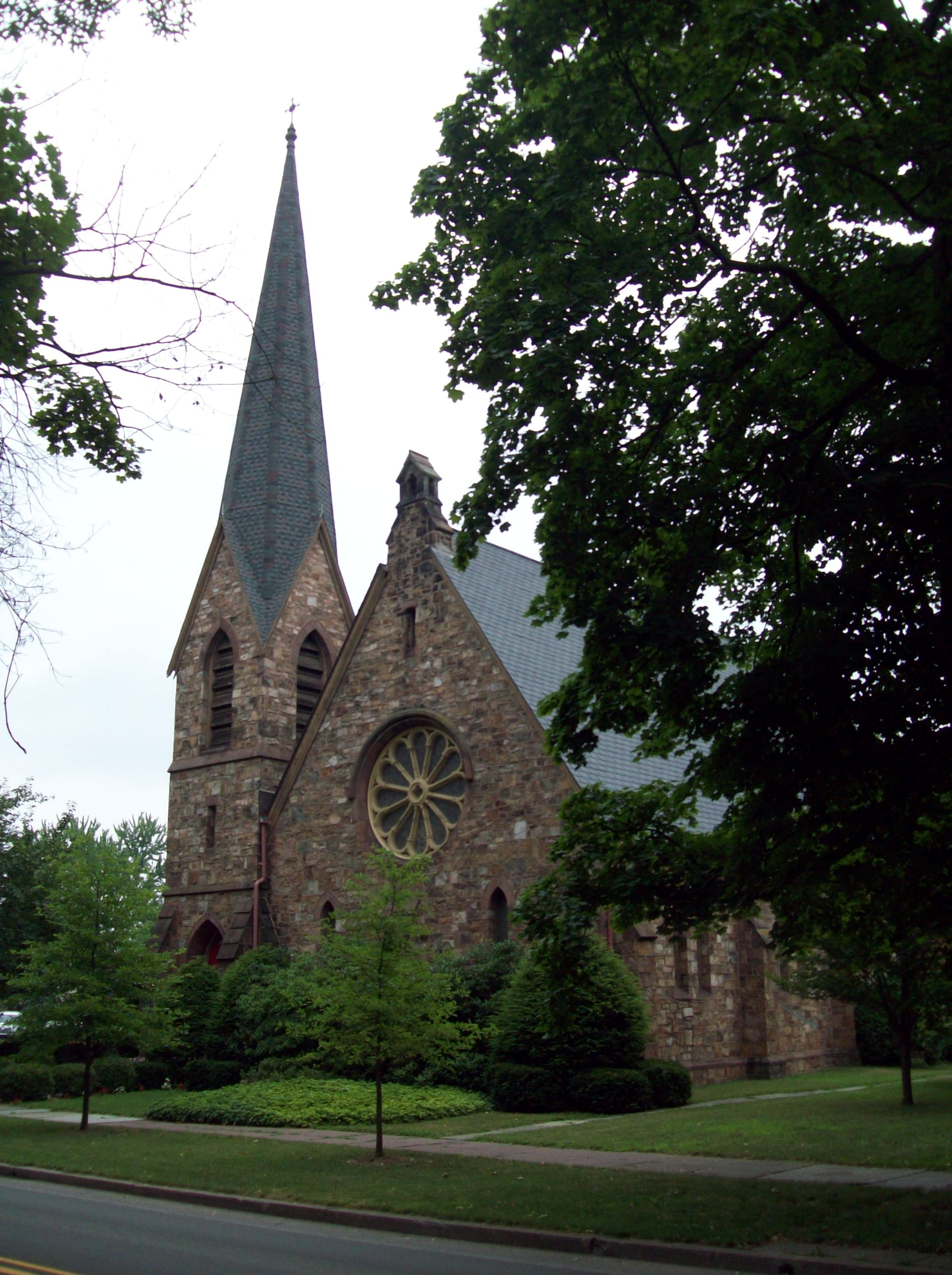
- St. James Episcopal Church, July 2012

- Location within Pennsylvania Location within the United States
- Location: 215 S. Main St., Muncy, Pennsylvania
- Coordinates: 41°12′5″N 76°47′9″W
- Area: 0.3 acres (0.12 ha)
- Built: 1856
- Architect: Upjohn, Richard
- Architectural style: Gothic Revival
- NRHP reference No.: 79002294
- Added to NRHP: November 20, 1979

St. James Episcopal Church is a historic Episcopal church in Muncy, Lycoming County, Pennsylvania, United States. It was designed by architect Richard Upjohn in 1856, and was built between 1857 and 1859.

It was added to the National Register of Historic Places in 1979. It is located in the Muncy Historic District, listed on the National Register of Historic Places in 1980.
