= Muncy Historic District =

Historic district in Pennsylvania, United States

- U.S. National Register of Historic Places
- U.S. Historic district
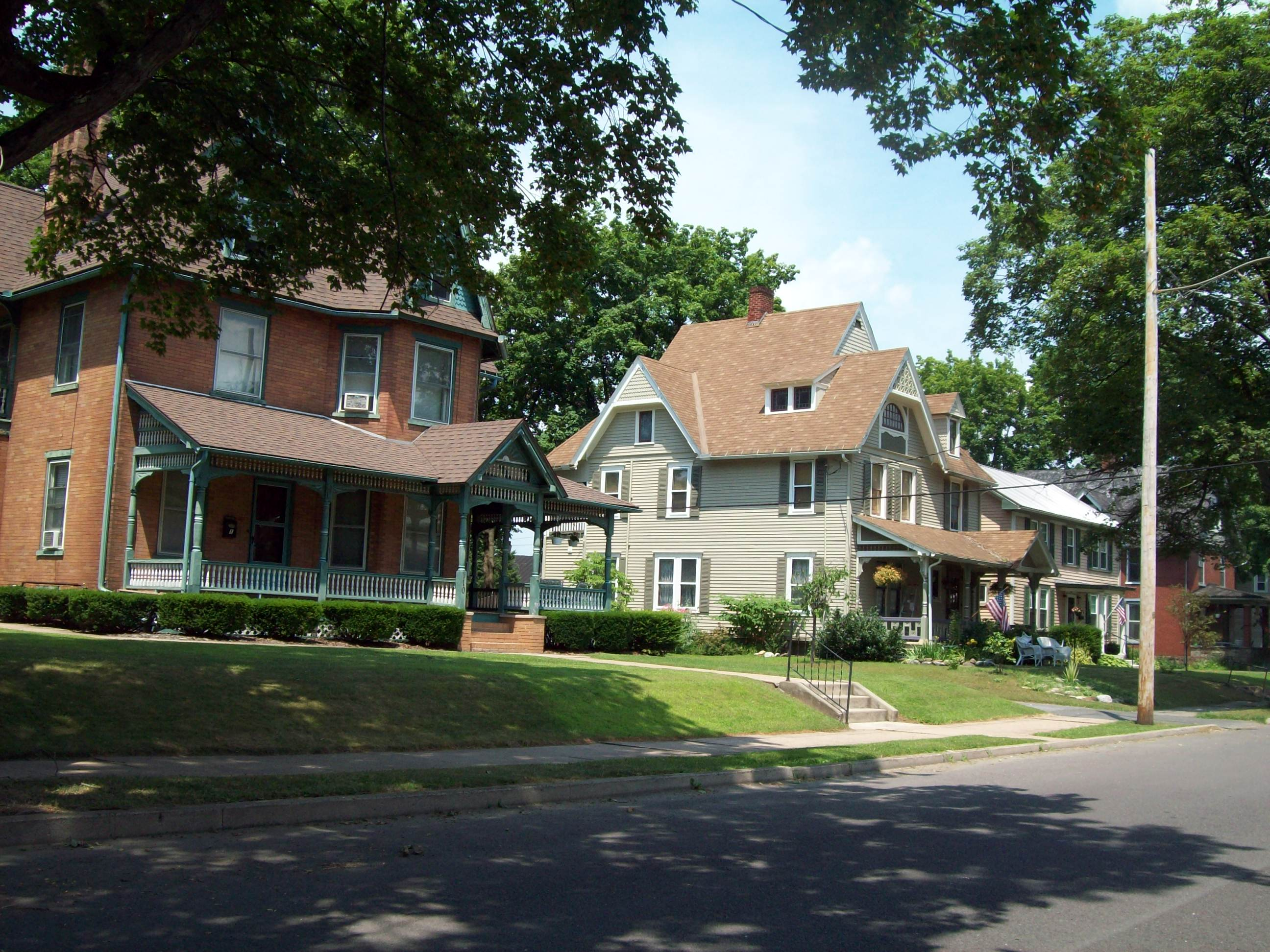
- Muncy Historic District, July 2011

- Location within Pennsylvania Location within the United States
- Location: Roughly bounded by Ridell Lane, Sherman, Washington and Mechanic Sts., Muncy, Pennsylvania
- Coordinates: 41°12′13″N 76°47′7″W
- Area: 151.9 acres (61.5 ha)
- Built: 1798
- Architect: Richard Upjohn (St. James Episcopal Church), others
- Architectural style: Late Victorian, Georgina, Federal
- NRHP reference No.: 80003570
- Added to NRHP: July 3, 1980

The Muncy Historic District is a national historic district that is located in Muncy, Lycoming County, Pennsylvania.

It was added to the National Register of Historic Places in 1980.

== History and architectural features ==
This district includes 298 contributing buildings that are located in the central business district and surrounding residential area of Muncy. The buildings date back as early as 1798, and are representative of Victorian, Georgian, and Federal styles of architecture. Notable buildings include the St. Andrew Lutheran Church, Muncy Presbyterian Church, William McCarty Residence, Walton-Weaver Residence, Gray-Bodine Residence, Boal-Griggs Building, Clapp-Muncy Historical Society Building, Jacob E. Cooke Row Houses, Clapp-Smith Building, Rankin-Brindle Building, Lloyd Building, Lycoming County Mutual Fire Insurance Building, Fahnestock-Petrikin Building, Muncy Valley House, and the D.O. Snyder Building. The St. James Episcopal Church, designed by Richard Upjohn, is listed separately on the National Register.
