= Genetti Hotel =

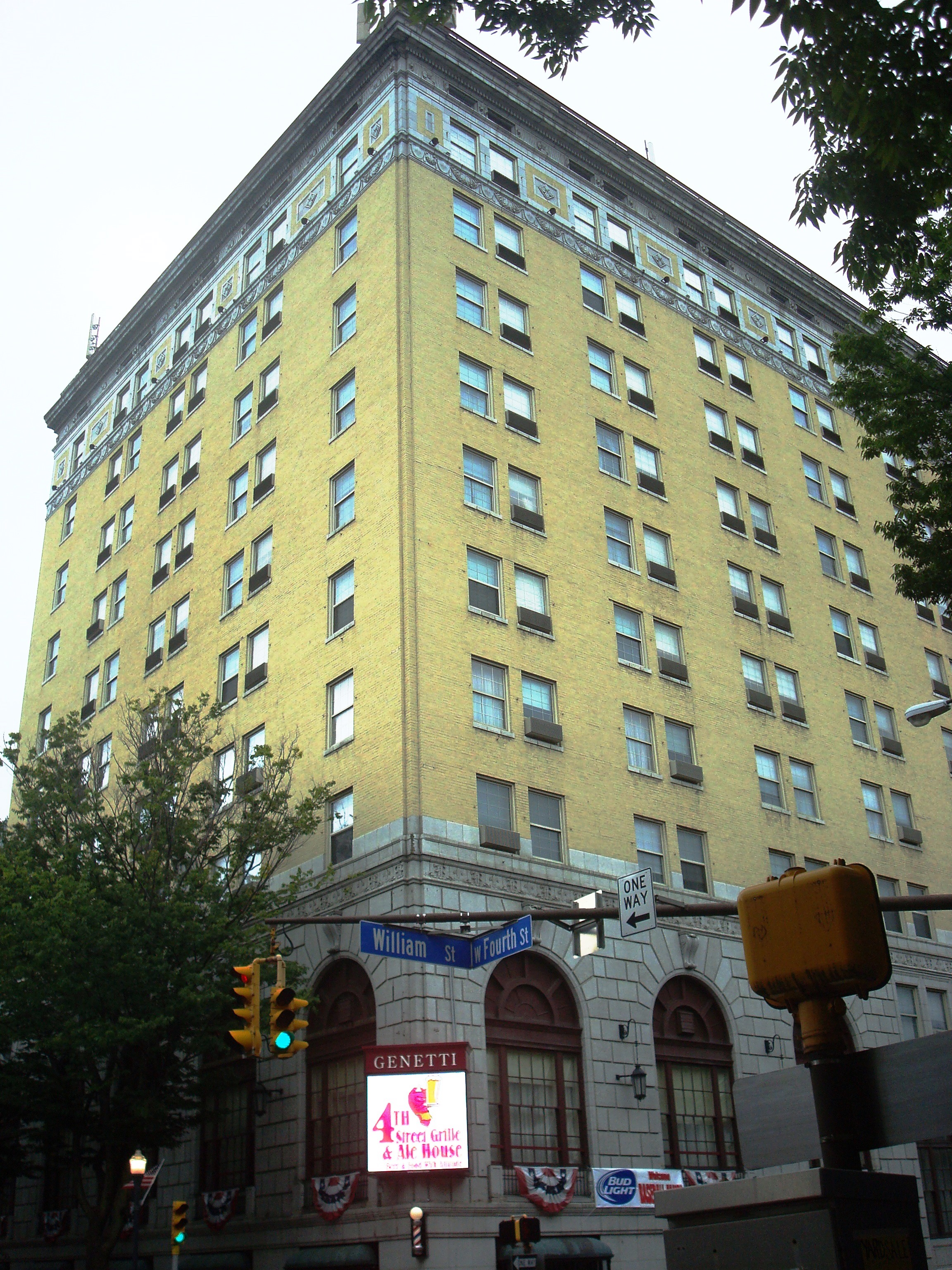
- Genetti Hotel, 2014
- Former names: Lycoming Hotel

General information
- Status: Closed
- Location: 200 W 4th St, Williamsport, PA 17701, Williamsport, Pennsylvania, United States
- Coordinates: 41.2410°N 77.0056°W
- Construction started: 1921
- Opened: 1922
- Cost: $900,000
- Owner: Genetti Hotels

Height
- Height: 192 feet

Technical details
- Floor count: 11
- Lifts/elevators: 3

Design and construction
- Architect: William Lee Stoddart

Website
- http://www.genettihotel.com/

The Genetti Hotel, is a historic hotel in downtown in Williamsport, Pennsylvania, built in 1921 as the Lycoming Hotel. It closed in 2026 for major renovations.

== History ==
The Lycoming Hotel was constructed in 1921, in the midst of Williamsport's logging boom. It opened on June 21, 1922. It quickly became a destination site for convention planners representing business, civic, military, and professional associates across Pennsylvania.

The hotel's architect was New Jersey-born William Lee Stoddart. The hotel's first manager was John F. Letton. One of the grand opening ceremonies for the hotel included a formal presentation by a Pittsburgh chapter of The Gideons International, during the afternoon of June 21, 1922, at which time representatives of the organization presented a gift of Bibles to be placed in each hotel room. The Rev. Dr. C. Everest Granger delivered a formal address during that program.

A hotel amenity in 1922 and 1923 was a soda and candy fountain that was managed by Christian Kirias.

On September 30, 1922, Republican gubernatorial candidate Gifford Pinchot, delivered an address to the Women's Christian Temperance Union at its annual convention that was held at the Lycoming Hotel, which adhered strictly to the federal Prohibition laws that outlawed the sale of alcohol. During that speech, Pinchot expressed his support for prohibition as he advocated for the repeal of the Brook's license law to "put the law in Pennsylvania squarely in accord with the Volstead Act and the Eighteenth Amendment."

In 1975, local hotelier Gus Genetti purchased the Lycoming Hotel and renamed it the Genetti Hotel, renovating it at a cost of $250,000, including improvements to the lobby, kitchen, restaurant, and ballroom.

The hotel closed on November 23, 2026 for renovations that are scheduled to take two to three years.

== Construction ==
Designed by architect William Lee Stoddart, the Lycoming Hotel (now known as the Genetti Hotel) took a little over a year to build, with construction starting in 1921 and the project being completed in 1922. It is the second tallest building in Williamsport as the Trinity Episcopal Church stands 210 feet tall.

The hotel has been through many renovations, such as a new modern ballroom, new elevators, and a restoration of the hotel's exterior.

== See also ==
- Georgian Terrace Hotel
- Ellis Hotel
- Penn Tower
