= Williamsport, Pennsylvania =

City in Pennsylvania, United States

Williamsport
- City
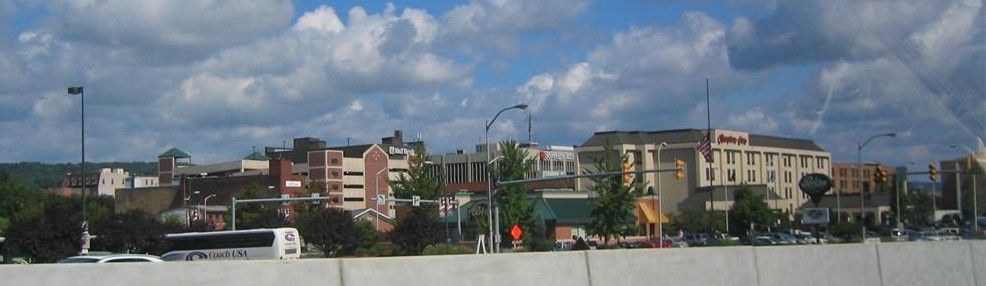
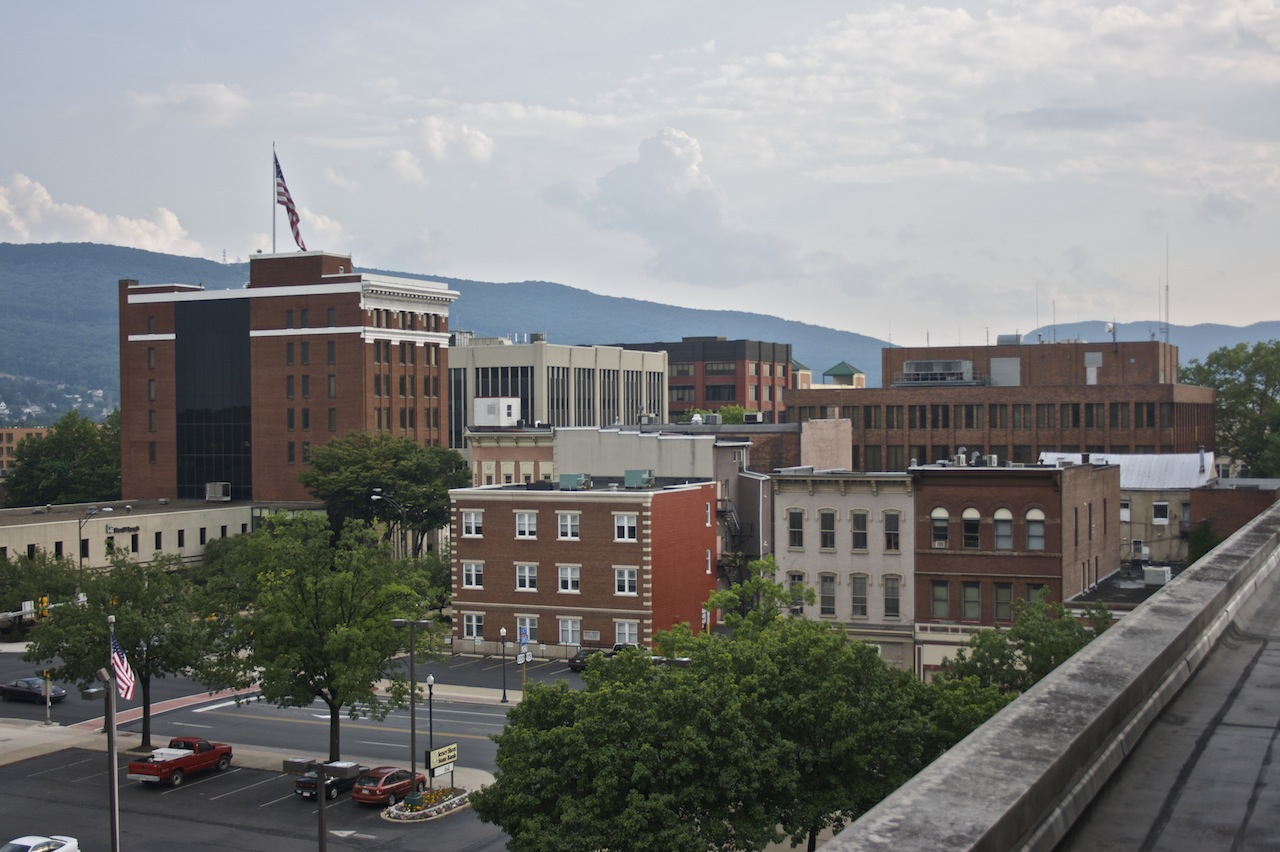
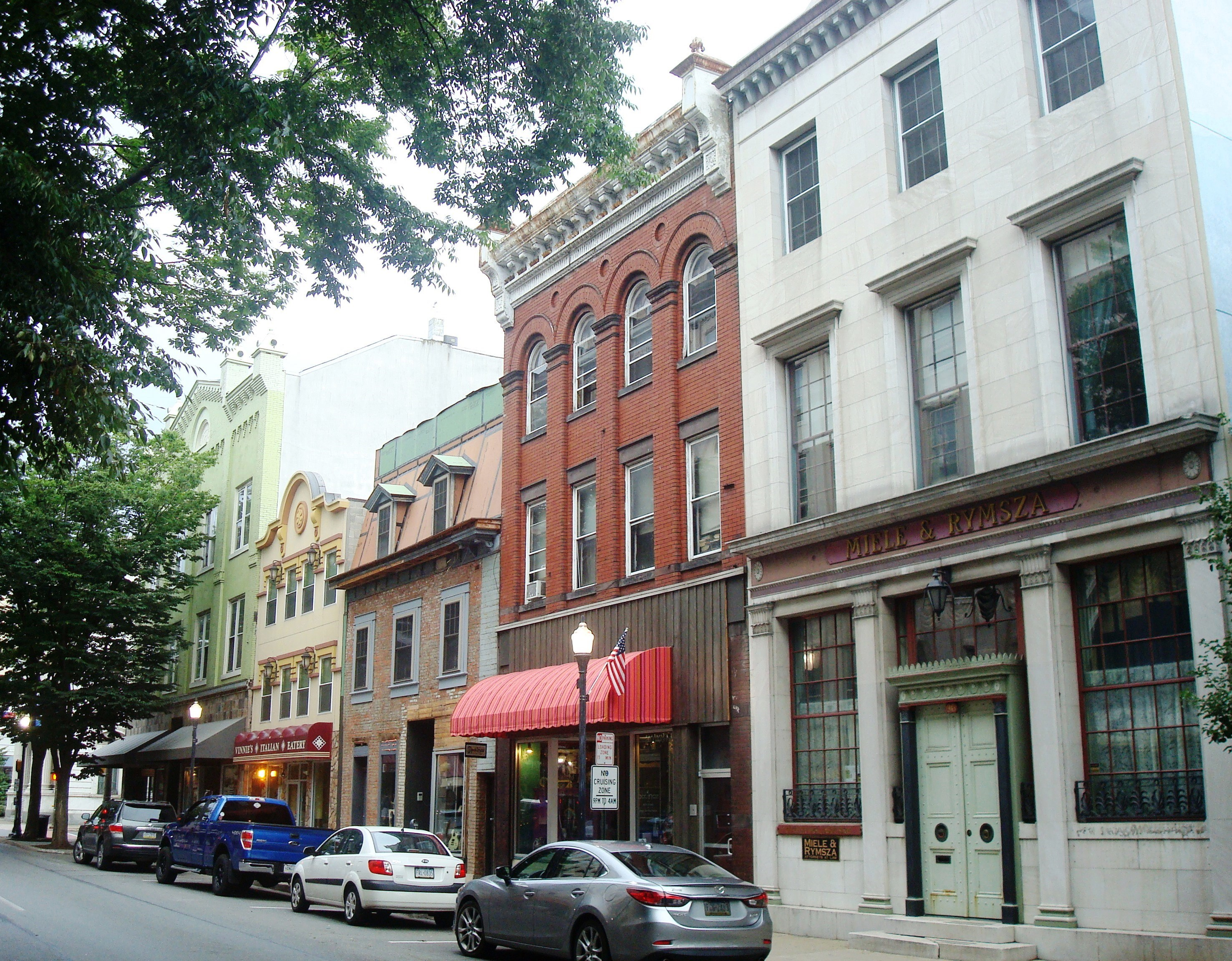
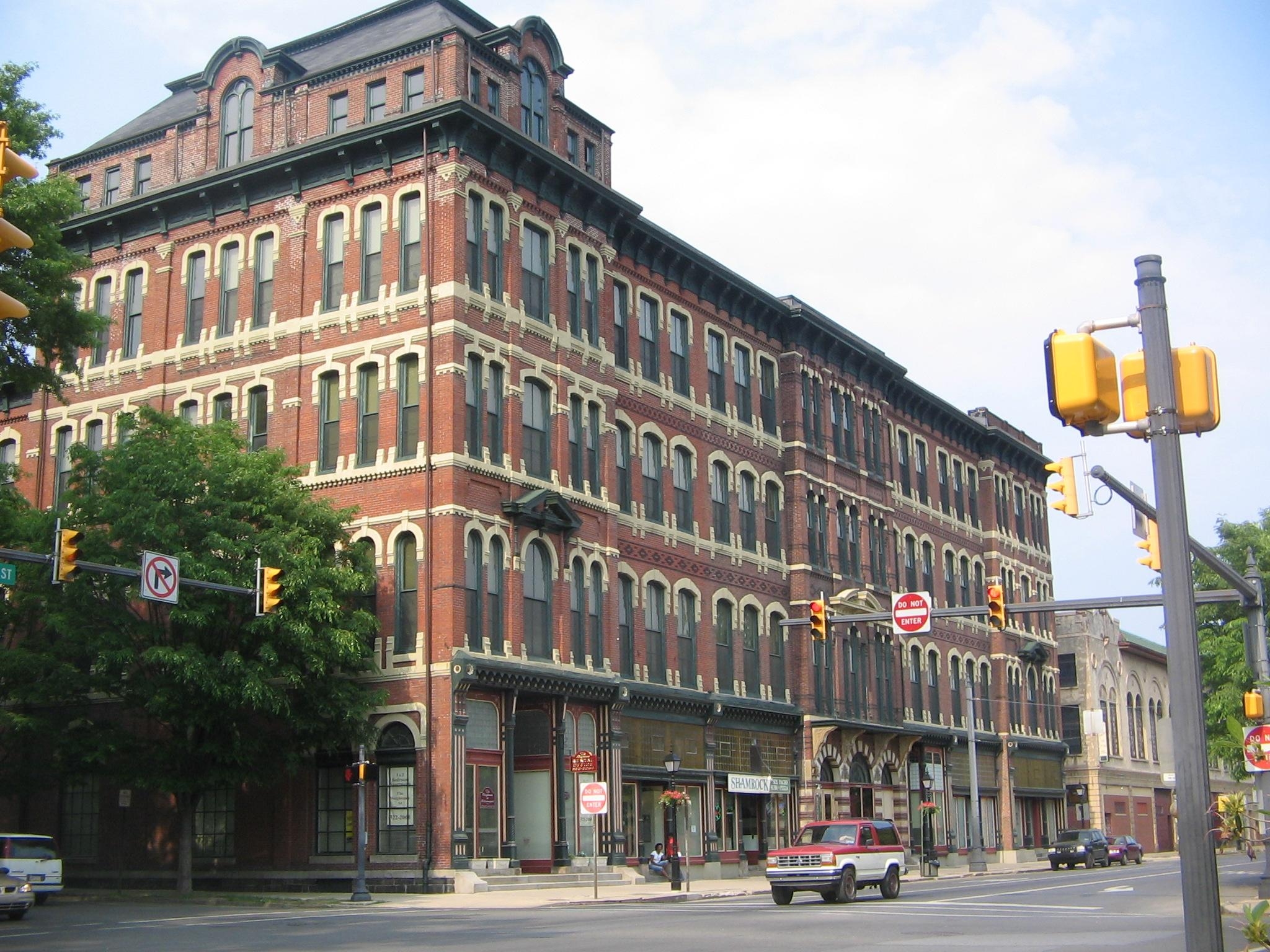
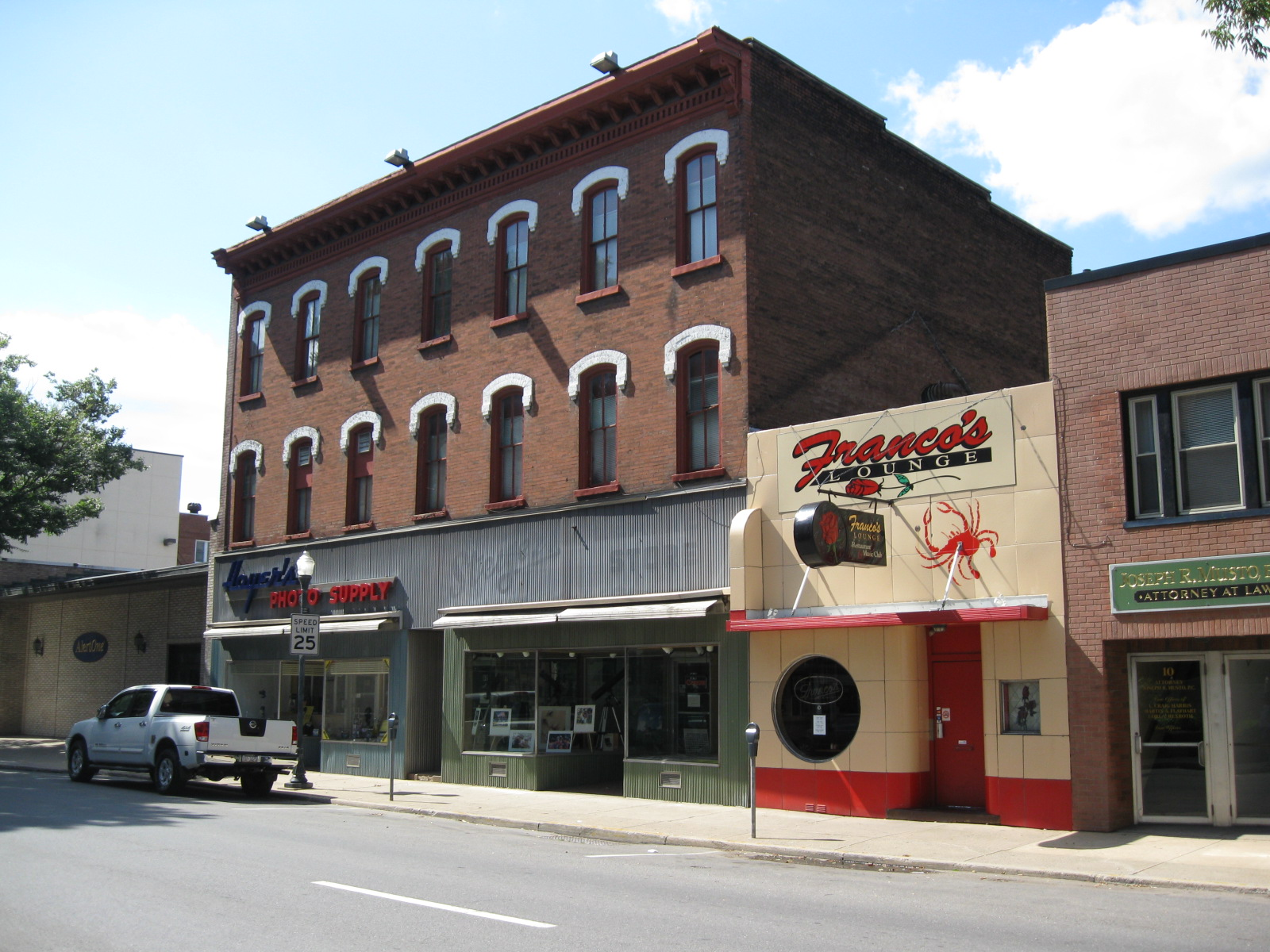
- Clockwise from top left: skyline, downtown from 4th Street, The Weightman Block, Franco's Lounge and skyline panorama

- Seal
- Nicknames: Wilpo, Billtown, The Port.
- Motto: The will is in us
- Location of Williamsport in Lycoming County, Pennsylvania

- Location of Williamsport in Pennsylvania Williamsport (the United States)
- Coordinates: 41°14′40″N 77°1′7″W
- Country: United States
- State: Pennsylvania
- County: Lycoming
- Settled: 1769
- Incorporated: 1806 (borough)
- 1866 (city)

Government
  - Mayor: Derek Slaughter (D)
  - City Council President: Eric Beiter (R)

Area
  - Total: 9.47 sq mi (24.53 km^{2})
  - Land: 8.78 sq mi (22.73 km^{2})
  - Water: 0.69 sq mi (1.80 km^{2})
- Elevation (benchmark at center of city): 528 ft (161 m)
- Highest elevation (water tank at northern boundary of city): 980 ft (300 m)
- Lowest elevation (West Branch Susquehanna River): 498 ft (152 m)

Population (2020)
  - Total: 27,754
  - Density: 3,162.1/sq mi (1,220.89/km^{2})
- Time zone: UTC−5 (Eastern (EST))
  - Summer (DST): UTC−4 (EDT)
- ZIP Codes: 17701,17702,17703,17705
- Area codes: 570 and 272
- FIPS code: 42-85312
- GNIS feature ID: 1213655
- Website: cityofwilliamsport.org

Williamsport is a city in and the county seat of Lycoming County, Pennsylvania, United States. As of the 2020 census, it had a population of 27,754. It is the principal city of the Williamsport Metropolitan Statistical Area, which has a population of about 114,000. Williamsport is the larger principal city of the Williamsport-Lock Haven Combined Statistical Area, which includes Lycoming and Clinton counties.

The city is the cultural, financial, and commercial center of North Central Pennsylvania. It is 177 miles (285 km) from Philadelphia, 199 miles (320 km) from Pittsburgh and 85 miles (137 km) from Harrisburg. It is known for its sports, arts scene and food. Williamsport was settled by Americans in the late 18th century, and began to prosper due to its lumber industry. In 1930, the city's population reached a high of 45,729 but since the Great Depression it has declined by approximately 40 percent to 27,754 in 2020.

As county seat, Williamsport has the county courthouse, county prison, sheriff's office headquarters and federal courthouse, all downtown. It is also home to two institutions of higher learning, the Pennsylvania College of Technology, also known as Penn College, and Lycoming College. Williamsport is the birthplace of Little League Baseball. South Williamsport, a town across the West Branch Susquehanna River, is the headquarters of Little League Baseball and annually hosts the Little League World Series in late summer. Other points of interest include the Hiawatha riverboat, Millionaires' Row, Peter J. McGovern Little League Museum, the Community Arts Center, the Genetti Hotel, the Susquehanna Riverwalk, and The Gallery at Penn College.

Williamsport is located 129.2 miles (207.9 km) northwest of Allentown and 86.3 miles (138.9 km) north of Harrisburg.

== History ==
=== Early history ===
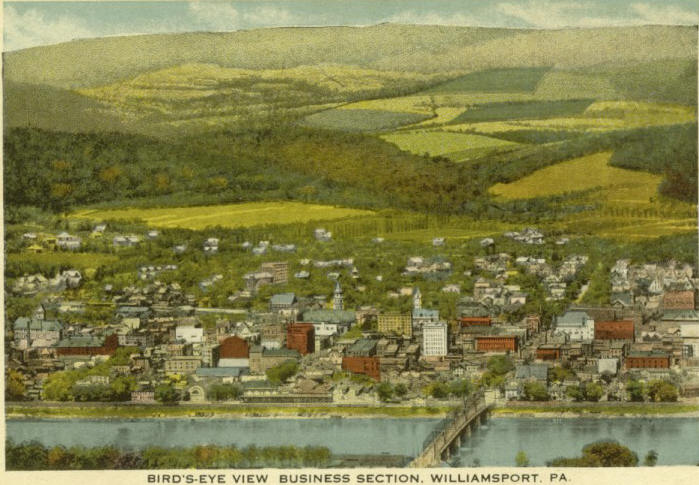
Aerial view of Williamsport from the early 20th century

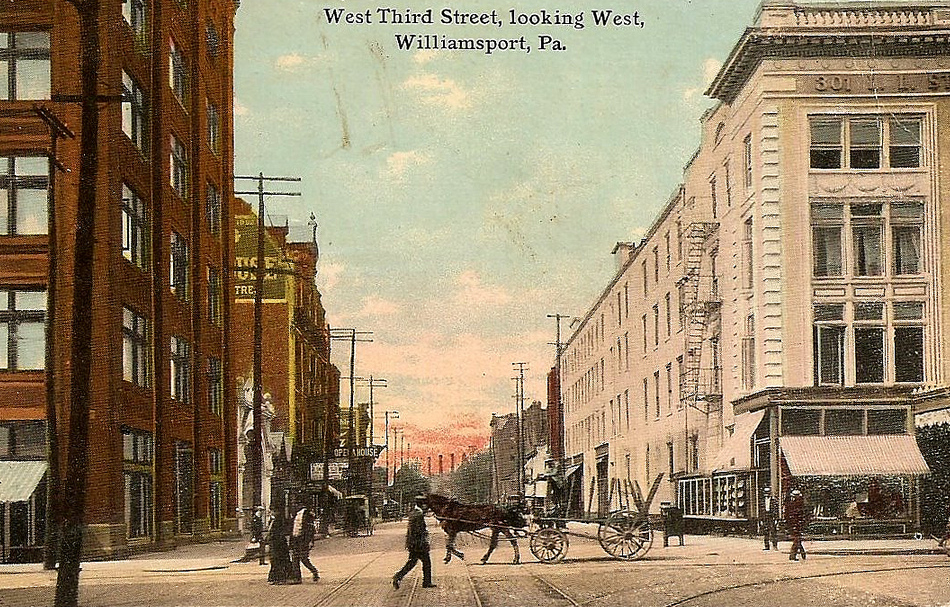
West Third Street looking west, c. 1910

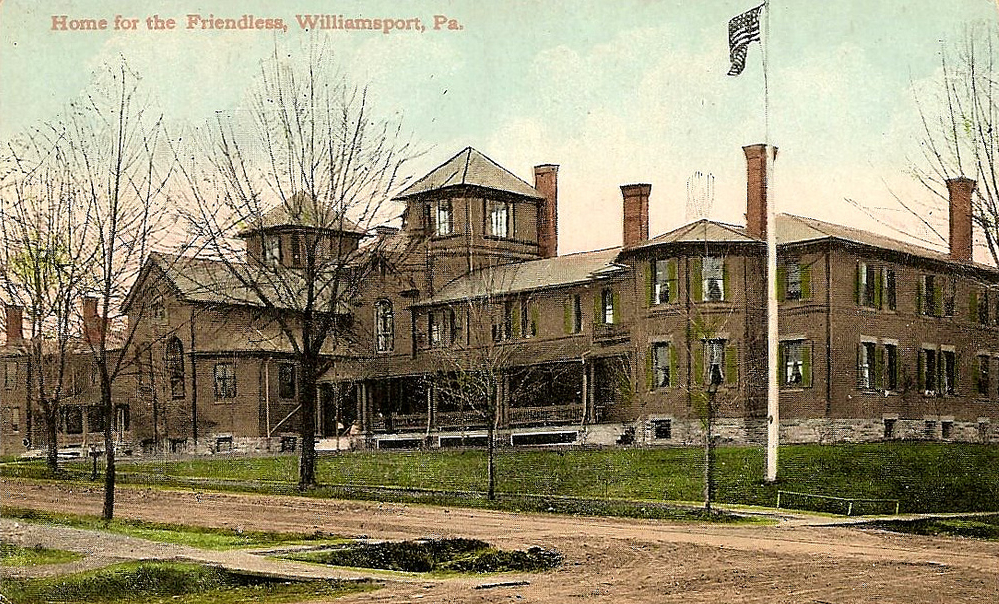
Williamsport Home for the Friendless, c. 1910

In 1763, the Battle of Muncy Hills took place during the French and Indian War. It was a clash between the Native Americans and colonists seeking homestead sites in Native American territory. In 1768, at the Treaty of Fort Stanwix, the British purchased the land that became Lycoming County from the Iroquois Nation who controlled the lands.

In March 1796 the first house was built in Williamsport. James Russell built his inn on what is now the northeastern corner of East Third and Mulberry Streets in downtown. On April 13, 1795, Lycoming County was formed from Northumberland County. It encompassed all the lands of Northumberland County situated west of Muncy Hills and was a domain of 12,500 square miles (32,000 km^{2}), comprising most of north central Pennsylvania. In 1796 the first recorded childbirth in Williamsport was James Russell, the son of Mr. and Mrs. William Russell and grandson of James Russell of the Russell Inn, and the first school was built as a one-room log addition to the building that would eventually become the first Lycoming County Courthouse. In 1798 the first brick house in Williamsport was erected on Front Street, between Market and Mulberry, by Andrew Tulloh, a lawyer. The bricks were made on the banks of Grafius Run where that stream crossed Hepburn Street.

In 1799, a post office opened at the corner of Third and State Streets in what is now downtown, and the following year, a jail was constructed at the northeast corner of William and Third Streets. The post office was later converted to a saloon.

In 1801, the town's first store was opened by William Winter on Third Street. In 1831 Jacob L. Mussina established the Repasz Band, the oldest brass band in America still in existence. On Oct. 15 1834 The West Branch Canal opened and the first boat to pass through the canal en route to Jersey Shore was that of George Aughenbaugh. The first freight carried into town was iron for the foundry of John B. Hall. The same year the enactment of the common school law by Pennsylvania Legislature led to public education here. In May 1835, the first public schools opened in Williamsport and also the town's first bank, the West Branch National Bank.

The Underground Railroad, used by enslaved African-Americans to obtain their freedom in the 30 years before the Civil War (1860–1865) included routes from states in the South, which supported slavery, to "free" states in the North and Canada. From 1830 until 1865, the underground railroad, a system of safe houses and routes for slaves escaping to freedom, operated in Lycoming County; many local abolitionists, including Daniel Hughes, served as conductors and agents.

Based on the oral history of Mamie Sweeting Diggs (1933–2011), fourth generation descent and great-granddaughter, Hughes, was a river raftsman on the Susquehanna river who had migrated from Oswego, New York. He lived on the Muncy Indian Reservation until he acquired land off Freedom Road. During his trips transporting logs to Maryland, he brought escaped slaves back on foot from Baltimore, over Bald Eagle Mountain and hid them at his home and in the caves on Freedom Road.

Mamie's grandfather, Robert, helped his father, Daniel Hughes, hide escaped slaves in the caves behind their home on Freedom Road. They fed them, nursed the sick back to health and delivered them safely to the next "station", The Apker House in Trout Run. The Apker House was the home of Robert Fairies, abolitionist and president of the Williamsport-Elmira Railroad. The railroad ran through his property where escaped slaves were hidden in the barn and house and then loaded into railway baggage cars for the trip to Elmira, NY, the next "station."

Mamie's grandfather, Robert passed the stories to his children, including Mamie's mother, Marion. Marion tended the family homestead, maintained Freedom Road Cemetery (where nine black Civil War vets are buried) and passed Daniel's stories down to her children.

In 1849, the Market Street Bridge was built over the West Branch Susquehanna River. It was opened as a toll bridge to cover the state's costs of $23,797. In 1854, a brewery opened. The brewery was sold to Henry Flock in 1865. This brewery was run by the Flock family until the 1940s. The Flocks' business survived Prohibition by converting to a dairy.

In 1875, the first tower clock in the United States to sound the Cambridge Quarters (Westminster Chime) was installed at Trinity Episcopal Church, a gift of Peter Herdic with bells given by judge J. W. Maynard. The following year, the Williamsport Hospital opened its first facility April 1 at Elmira and Edwin Streets.

In 1879 the world's first long distance (100 mile) oil pipeline was laid by the Tide Water Pipe Company with Williamsport as its terminus, where oil was transferred to tank cars of the Reading Railroad.

In 1881, a state law ended racial segregation in Pennsylvania schools. By 1948, all schools in this area were integrated. In 1895, Harry Houdini appeared in one of his earliest performances, at the Old Fair Grounds with The Welch Brothers Circus.

Williamsport was the birthplace of the national newspaper Grit in 1882. Williamsport purportedly once had more millionaires per-capita than anywhere else in the world. For this reason, the area's local high school, the Williamsport Area High School, uses "Millionaires" as its team mascot.

=== Modern history ===
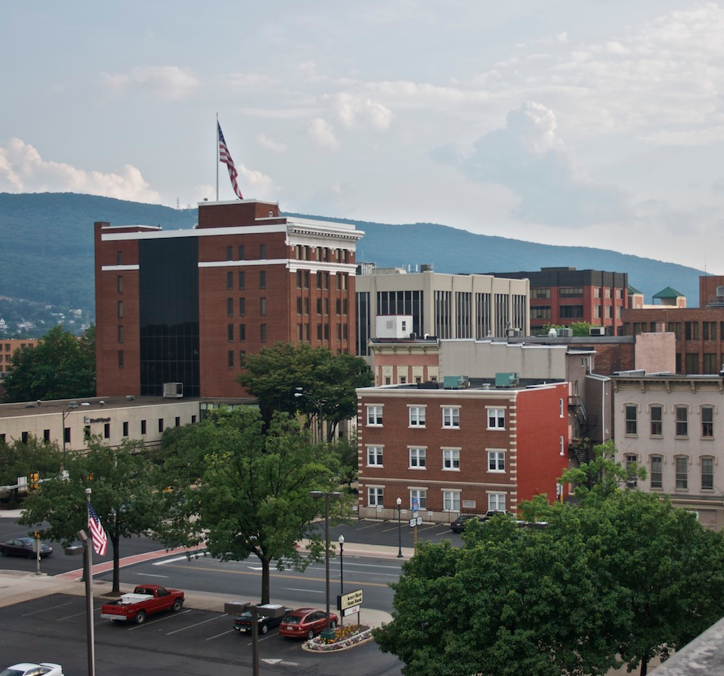
Downtown Williamsport

The Flood of March 17–18, 1936 caused the river to crest at 33.9'. Flood waters reached High Street. It was known locally as the Hello, Al flood because Al Glaes, operating a short-wave radio station from his home on High Street, kept the city in touch with the rest of the world after the flood disrupted electricity and telephone service.

On June 6, 1939, the first Little League Baseball game was played on a sandlot outside Bowman Field in Williamsport. Carl Stotz conceived the idea of a Little League, and he and Bert and George Bebble managed the first three teams. In 1941 the U.S. entered World War II after the Japanese attacked Pearl Harbor. Williamsport native Joe Lockard, stationed on Oahu, gave warning of the impending attack based on radar readings. His readings were dismissed as American B17 bombers coming in from the mainland. Also in 1941 the Williamsport School Board created the Williamsport Technical Institute for high school and post-high school students. It grew into the Williamsport Area Community College, and later became Pennsylvania College of Technology.

== Geography and climate ==
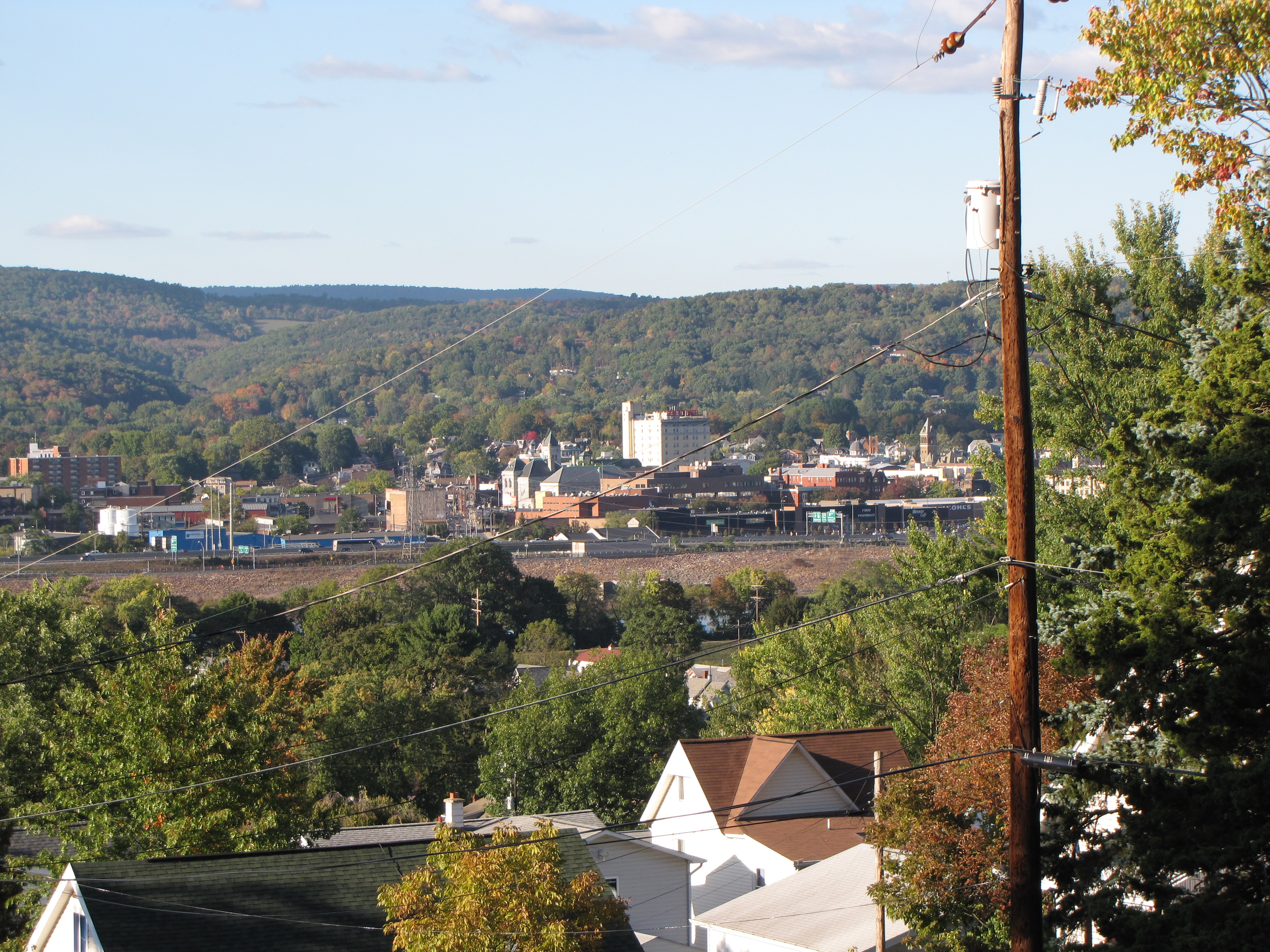
Downtown and the Genetti Hotel seen from neighboring South Williamsport

=== Geography ===
==== Physical geography and area landscape ====
Williamsport is located at 41°14′40″N 77°1′7″W (41.244428, −77.018738), and is bordered by the West Branch Susquehanna River to the south (with Armstrong Township, South Williamsport, Duboistown and Susquehanna Township south of the river), Loyalsock Township to the east and north, Old Lycoming Township to the north and Woodward Township to the west. As the crow flies, Lycoming County is about 130 miles (209 km) northwest of Philadelphia and 165 miles (266 km) east-northeast of Pittsburgh.

==== Historical places and neighborhoods ====
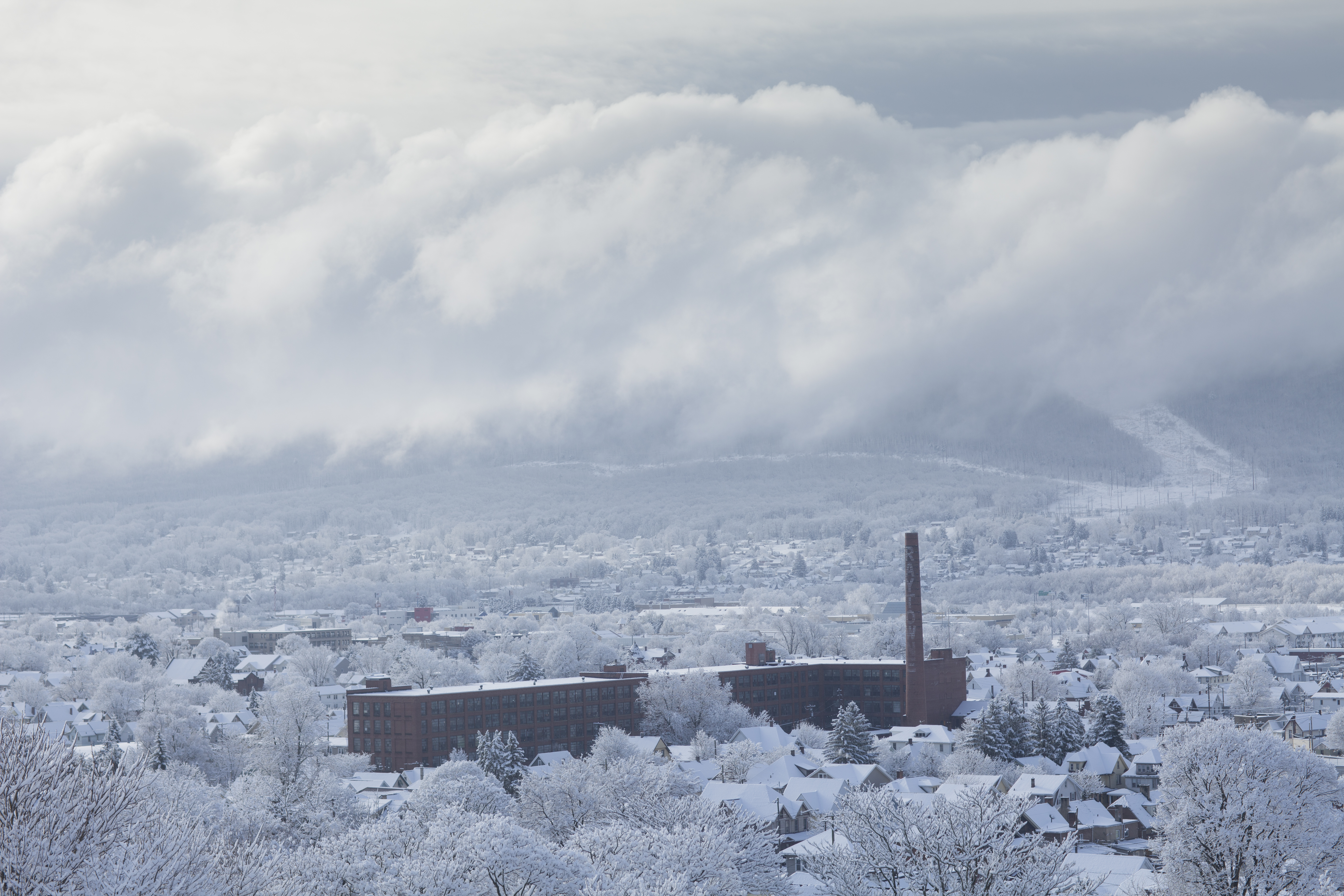
The historic Pajama Factory seen from Wildwood cemetery in February 2018

The Peter Herdic House, Hart Building, Millionaire's Row Historic District, City Hall, Williamsport Armory, and Old City Hall are listed on the National Register of Historic Places.

Neighborhoods of Williamsport include:

- Downtown, between Hepburn Street and Basin Street, south of Little League Blvd
- Grampian Hills, the area around and north of Grampian Blvd.
- Millionaire's Row, along W. 4th Street
- Newberry, west of Lycoming Creek
- Park Avenue, south of Williamsport Hospital
- Vallamont, the area north of Rural Ave and west of Market St.
- East End, the area south of Grampian Blvd. and east of Market St.
- West Hills, the hillside and hilltop north of Dewey and west of Round Hill Road.

According to the United States Census Bureau, the city has a total area of 9.5 square miles (25 km^{2}), of which 8.9 square miles (23 km^{2}) is land and 0.7 square miles (1.8 km^{2}) (6.92%) is water.

=== Climate ===
Under the Köppen climate classification, Williamsport falls within either a hot-summer humid continental climate (Dfa) if the 0 °C (32 °F) isotherm is used or a humid subtropical climate (Cfa) if the −3 °C (27 °F) isotherm is used. Williamsport has four distinct seasons, and lies in USDA hardiness zone 6b, with areas away from the West Branch Susquehanna River falling in zone 6a. Winters are cold and comparatively dry but typically bring a mix of rain, sleet, and snow with occasional heavy snowfall and icing. January is the coldest month with an average mean temperature of 26.8 °F (−2.9 °C), with temperatures on average dropping to or below 0 °F (−18 °C) on 2.8 days and staying at or below freezing on 29 days per year. Snowfall averages 36.0 inches (91 cm) per season. The snowiest month on record was 40.1 inches (102 cm) in January 1987, while winter snowfall amounts have ranged from 85.9 in (218 cm) in 1995–96 to 7.0 in (18 cm) in 1988–89. Summers are typically very warm and humid with temperatures exceeding 90 °F (32 °C) on 15 days per year on average; the annual count has been as high as 42 days in 1988, while only 1907 and 1979 did not reach that mark. July is the warmest month with an average mean temperature of 72.7 °F (23 °C).

The all-time record high temperature in Williamsport of 106 °F (41 °C) was established on July 9, 1936, which occurred during the Dust Bowl, and the all-time record low temperature of −20 °F (−29 °C) was set on January 21, 1994. The first and last freezes of the season on average fall on October 16 and April 30, respectively, allowing a growing season of 168 days. The normal annual mean temperature is 50.4 °F (10.2 °C). Normal yearly precipitation based on the 30-year average from 1981 to 2010 is 41.28 inches (1,049 mm), falling on an average 133 days. Monthly precipitation has ranged from 16.80 in (427 mm) in June 1972 (due to heavy rainfall from Hurricane Agnes) to 0.16 in (4.1 mm) in September 1943, while for annual precipitation the historical range is 70.26 in (1,785 mm) in 2011 to 27.68 in (703 mm) in 1930.

Climate data for Williamsport Regional Airport, Pennsylvania (1991–2020 normals, (Note: Mean monthly maxima and minima (i.e. the expected highest and lowest temperature readings at any point during the year or given month) calculated based on data at said location from 1991 to 2020.) extremes 1895–present)
| Month | Jan | Feb | Mar | Apr | May | Jun | Jul | Aug | Sep | Oct | Nov | Dec | Year |
|---|---|---|---|---|---|---|---|---|---|---|---|---|---|
| Record high °F (°C) | 70 (21) | 76 (24) | 87 (31) | 96 (36) | 96 (36) | 104 (40) | 106 (41) | 103 (39) | 102 (39) | 93 (34) | 83 (28) | 70 (21) | 106 (41) |
| Mean maximum °F (°C) | 56 (13) | 58 (14) | 70 (21) | 83 (28) | 90 (32) | 93 (34) | 95 (35) | 92 (33) | 89 (32) | 79 (26) | 68 (20) | 58 (14) | 96 (36) |
| Mean daily maximum °F (°C) | 35.3 (1.8) | 38.7 (3.7) | 48.4 (9.1) | 61.7 (16.5) | 72.4 (22.4) | 80.5 (26.9) | 84.8 (29.3) | 82.7 (28.2) | 75.2 (24.0) | 63.1 (17.3) | 50.6 (10.3) | 39.7 (4.3) | 61.1 (16.2) |
| Daily mean °F (°C) | 27.7 (−2.4) | 30.1 (−1.1) | 38.7 (3.7) | 50.3 (10.2) | 60.8 (16.0) | 69.4 (20.8) | 73.7 (23.2) | 72.0 (22.2) | 64.7 (18.2) | 53.0 (11.7) | 41.9 (5.5) | 32.8 (0.4) | 51.3 (10.7) |
| Mean daily minimum °F (°C) | 20.1 (−6.6) | 21.5 (−5.8) | 29.0 (−1.7) | 39.0 (3.9) | 49.1 (9.5) | 58.3 (14.6) | 62.7 (17.1) | 61.2 (16.2) | 54.1 (12.3) | 42.8 (6.0) | 33.2 (0.7) | 25.8 (−3.4) | 41.4 (5.2) |
| Mean minimum °F (°C) | 1 (−17) | 5 (−15) | 13 (−11) | 25 (−4) | 34 (1) | 45 (7) | 52 (11) | 50 (10) | 40 (4) | 30 (−1) | 19 (−7) | 10 (−12) | −1 (−18) |
| Record low °F (°C) | −20 (−29) | −18 (−28) | −5 (−21) | 8 (−13) | 28 (−2) | 36 (2) | 43 (6) | 38 (3) | 28 (−2) | 19 (−7) | 3 (−16) | −15 (−26) | −20 (−29) |
| Average precipitation inches (mm) | 2.96 (75) | 2.31 (59) | 3.13 (80) | 3.62 (92) | 3.86 (98) | 3.85 (98) | 4.64 (118) | 4.17 (106) | 4.76 (121) | 3.70 (94) | 3.25 (83) | 3.27 (83) | 43.52 (1,105) |
| Average snowfall inches (cm) | 9.7 (25) | 9.3 (24) | 7.3 (19) | 0.8 (2.0) | 0.0 (0.0) | 0.0 (0.0) | 0.0 (0.0) | 0.0 (0.0) | 0.0 (0.0) | 0.1 (0.25) | 1.7 (4.3) | 6.9 (18) | 35.8 (91) |
| Average precipitation days (≥ 0.01 in) | 12.1 | 10.1 | 11.6 | 12.2 | 13.7 | 11.8 | 11.9 | 10.5 | 10.0 | 10.7 | 10.0 | 11.9 | 136.5 |
| Average snowy days (≥ 0.1 in) | 7.7 | 6.0 | 3.4 | 0.6 | 0.0 | 0.0 | 0.0 | 0.0 | 0.0 | 0.2 | 1.4 | 4.6 | 23.9 |
Source: NOAA

== Demographics ==
Historical population
| Census | Pop. | Note | %± |
|---|---|---|---|
| 1810 | 344 | | — |
| 1820 | 624 | | 81.4% |
| 1840 | 1,353 | | — |
| 1850 | 1,615 | | 19.4% |
| 1860 | 5,664 | | 250.7% |
| 1870 | 16,030 | | 183.0% |
| 1880 | 18,934 | | 18.1% |
| 1890 | 27,132 | | 43.3% |
| 1900 | 28,757 | | 6.0% |
| 1910 | 31,860 | | 10.8% |
| 1920 | 36,198 | | 13.6% |
| 1930 | 45,729 | | 26.3% |
| 1940 | 44,355 | | −3.0% |
| 1950 | 45,047 | | 1.6% |
| 1960 | 41,967 | | −6.8% |
| 1970 | 37,918 | | −9.6% |
| 1980 | 33,401 | | −11.9% |
| 1990 | 31,933 | | −4.4% |
| 2000 | 30,706 | | −3.8% |
| 2010 | 29,381 | | −4.3% |
| 2020 | 27,754 | | −5.5% |
U.S. Decennial Census

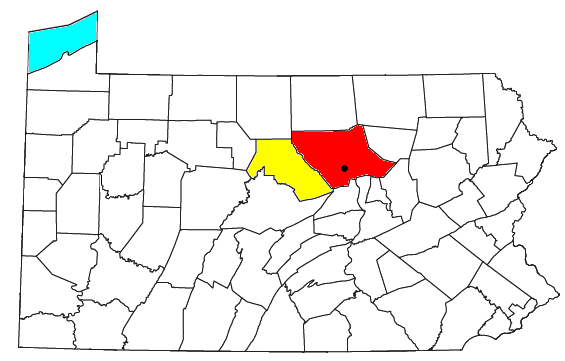
Location of the Williamsport–Lock Haven CSA and its components: Williamsport Metropolitan Statistical Area Lock Haven Micropolitan Statistical Area The black dot shows the location of Williamsport

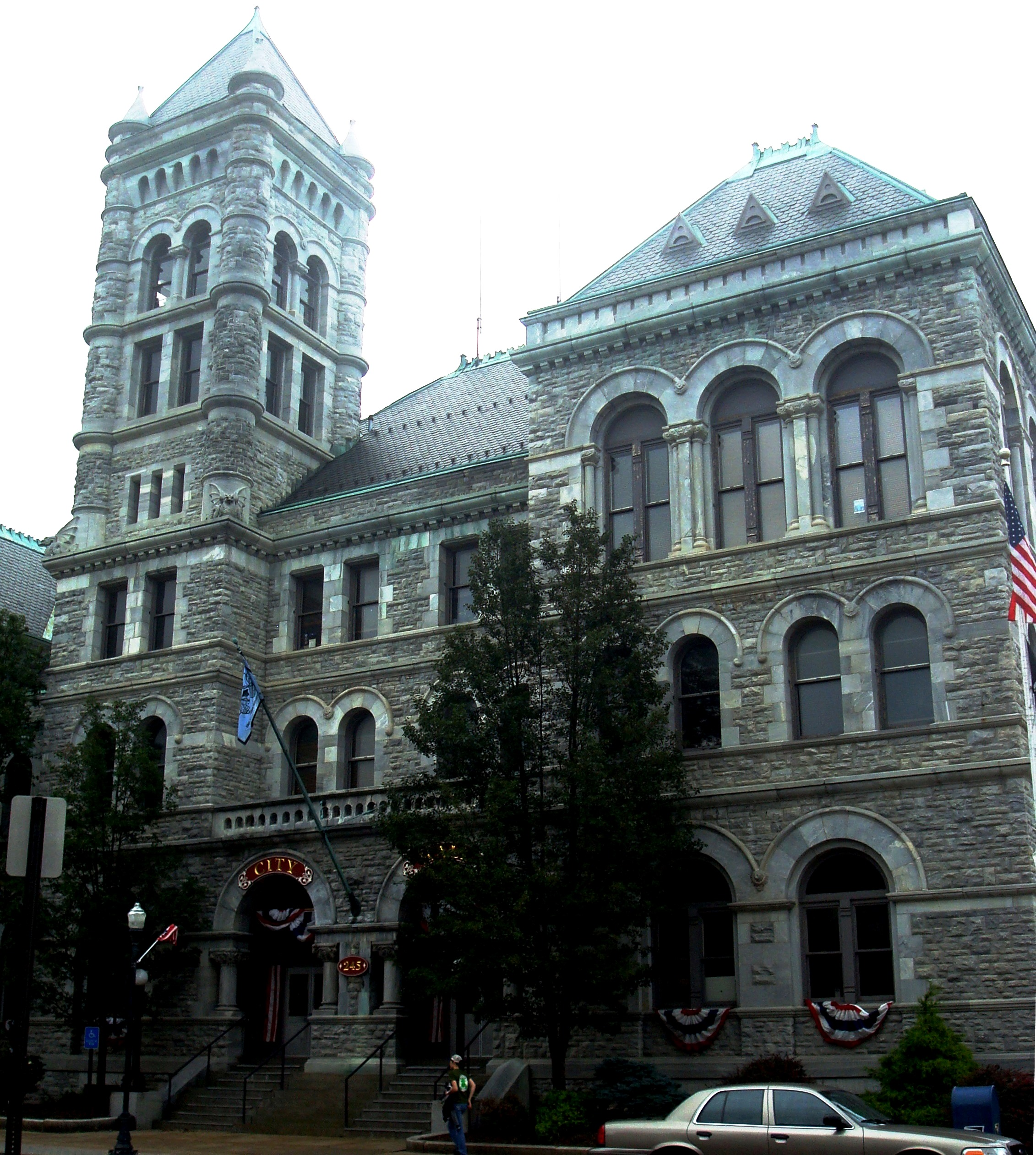
Williamsport City Hall, a former U.S. Post Office

Williamsport is the larger principal city of the Williamsport–Lock Haven, PA Combined Statistical Area, which includes the Williamsport metropolitan area (Lycoming County) and the Lock Haven micropolitan area (Clinton County) and had a combined population of 157,958 at the 2000 census.

=== 2020 census ===
As of the 2020 census, Williamsport had a population of 27,754. The median age was 32.4 years. 21.0% of residents were under the age of 18 and 14.1% of residents were 65 years of age or older. For every 100 females there were 101.4 males, and for every 100 females age 18 and over there were 100.8 males age 18 and over.

99.9% of residents lived in urban areas, while 0.1% lived in rural areas.

There were 11,193 households in Williamsport, of which 26.7% had children under the age of 18 living in them. Of all households, 27.5% were married-couple households, 25.7% were households with a male householder and no spouse or partner present, and 36.2% were households with a female householder and no spouse or partner present. About 39.1% of all households were made up of individuals and 13.6% had someone living alone who was 65 years of age or older.

There were 12,928 housing units, of which 13.4% were vacant. The homeowner vacancy rate was 3.1% and the rental vacancy rate was 10.2%.

Racial composition as of the 2020 census
| Race | Number | Percent |
|---|---|---|
| White | 20,150 | 72.6% |
| Black or African American | 4,489 | 16.2% |
| American Indian and Alaska Native | 69 | 0.2% |
| Asian | 299 | 1.1% |
| Native Hawaiian and Other Pacific Islander | 12 | 0.0% |
| Some other race | 482 | 1.7% |
| Two or more races | 2,253 | 8.1% |
| Hispanic or Latino (of any race) | 1,166 | 4.2% |

=== 2000 census ===
As of the 2000 census, there were 30,706 people, 12,219 households, and 6,732 families residing in the city. The population density was 3,456.3 inhabitants per square mile (1,334.5/km^{2}). There were 13,524 housing units at an average density of 1,522.3 per square mile (587.8/km^{2}). The racial makeup of the city was 84.1% White, 12.7% Black, 0.4% Native American, 0.6% Asian, 0.0% Pacific Islander, 0.5% from other races, and 1.7% from two or more races. Hispanic or Latino of any race were 1.1% of the population.

There were 12,219 households, out of which 27.4% had children under the age of 18 living with them, 34.9% were married couples living together, 15.5% had a female householder with no husband present, and 44.9% were non-families. 35.1% of all households were made up of individuals, and 12.9% had someone living alone who was 65 years of age or older. The average household size was 2.30 and the average family size was 2.97.

In the city the population was spread out, with 22.5% under the age of 18, 18.0% from 18 to 24, 26.7% from 25 to 44, 19.4% from 45 to 64, and 13.5% who were 65 years of age or older. The median age was 32 years. For every 100 females, there were 97.7 males. For every 100 females age 18 and over, there were 95.9 males.

The median income for a household in the city was $25,946, and the median income for a family was $33,844. Males had a median income of $26,668 versus $20,196 for females. The per capita income for the city was $14,707. About 13.7% of families and 21.5% of the population were below the poverty line, including 24.0% of those under age 18 and 11.6% of those age 65 or over.

=== Crime ===
Crime in Williamsport, Pennsylvania
| Crime | 2005 | 2006 | 2007 | 2008 | 2009 | 2010 | 2011 | 2012 | 2013 | 2014 | 2015 | 2016 | 2017 |
|---|---|---|---|---|---|---|---|---|---|---|---|---|---|
| Homicides | 3 | 1 | 1 | 2 | 2 | 2 | 1 | 2 | 5 | 3 | 7 | 5 | 2 |
| Rapes | 16 | 4 | 10 | 5 | 14 | 12 | 8 | 5 | 10 | 9 | 19 | 8 | 12 |
| Robberies | 54 | 72 | 58 | 51 | 35 | 29 | 21 | 55 | 56 | 71 | 39 | 38 | 29 |
| Assaults | 51 | 35 | 41 | 39 | 21 | 66 | 71 | 48 | 61 | 37 | 44 | 33 | 56 |
| Burglaries | 219 | 297 | 296 | 227 | 191 | 232 | 222 | 262 | 138 | 188 | 121 | 99 | 133 |
| Thefts | 917 | 1,123 | 970 | 840 | 876 | 977 | 983 | 1,101 | 902 | 823 | 777 | 893 | 898 |
| Auto Thefts | 72 | 77 | 61 | 84 | 56 | 50 | 43 | 23 | 26 | 31 | 44 | 29 | 35 |
| Arsons | 13 | 20 | 16 | 9 | 2 | 19 | 8 | 18 | 7 | 5 | 11 | 8 | 9 |
| Crime Index (National average is 277.4) | 348.9 | 350.2 | 326.3 | 302.9 | 333.5 | 318.4 | 325.6 | 310.4 | 319.5 | 322.2 | 339.3 | 254.2 | 259.8 |
Williamsport Crime data from State/Federal Crime statistics

== Government ==
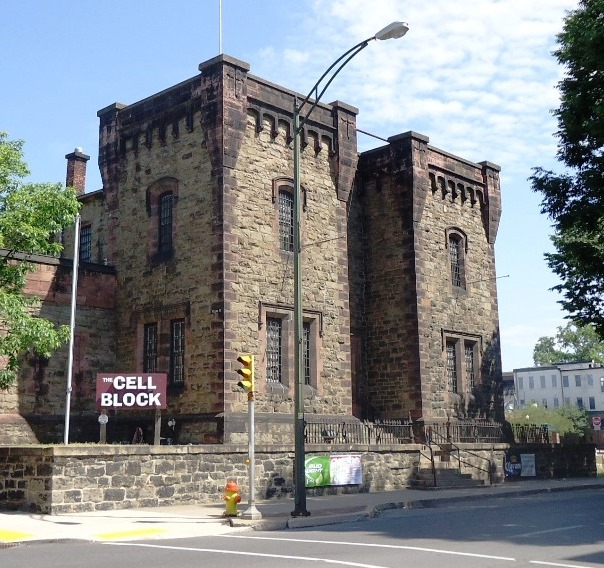
Lycoming County Prison was built between 1799 and 1801; today it is a night club.

Williamsport operates on a "Strong Mayor" form of government, meaning the mayor is given almost total administrative authority and a clear, wide range of political independence with the power to appoint and dismiss department heads without council approval and little need for public input. The mayor is Derek Slaughter.

Williamsport is located in Pennsylvania's 23rd senatorial District, Pennsylvania's 83rd House District, Pennsylvania's 9th congressional district, and Pennsylvania's 15th congressional district.

=== Fire protection ===
Williamsport Bureau of Fire was established in 1874 after a devastating fire that destroyed much of the city's downtown in 1871. It has a cooperative agreement with the Old Lycoming Volunteer Fire Department. Since the late 1980s, it contracts with Susquehanna Regional EMS for ambulance service.

== Economy ==
Williamsport's top ten employers are UPMC Susquehanna, the Pennsylvania State Government, the Pennsylvania College of Technology, Williamsport Area School District, Brodart Company, Springs Window Fashions, Weis Markets, West Pharmaceuticals, and Textron Lycoming Engines.

Williamsport is noted for the Lycoming aircraft engines which is a division of Avco Corporation and a subsidiary of Textron. Brodart, a library supplies company, is also based in Williamsport. Overhead Garage Door is also located in Newberry. Bethlehem Wire Rope, a 46-acre (190,000 m^{2}) manufacturing complex in Williamsport, with over 620,000 square feet (58,000 m^{2}) under roof, is the single largest wire rope manufacturing facility in North America.

Recently, interest has grown in extracting natural gas in the Williamsport area. Williamsport has become a key area in the Marcellus Shale drilling.

Lonza Group, a Swiss biotechnology and pharmaceutical company, has a large manufacturing site on the western fringes of the city, where a number of specialty chemicals are made that go into a wide array of oilfield, nutritional, personal care, and industrial applications.

The Williamsport Downtown Gateway Revitalization Project began in 2004 in order to attract more people (both citizens of the Williamsport community and visitors) to the downtown Williamsport area. The construction on the Carl E. Stotz Memorial Little League Bridge, the first of many projects, began in June 2004 and was completed in 2008.

== Education ==
Williamsport is the home of Lycoming College and Pennsylvania College of Technology, and The Commonwealth Medical College. There is also a continuing education center of Pennsylvania State University located in Williamsport.

Williamsport Area School District consists of:

- Cochran Primary School
- Hepburn Lycoming Primary School
- Jackson Primary School
- Curtin Intermediate School
- Lycoming Valley Intermediate School
- Williamsport Area Middle School
- Williamsport Area High School

Stevens Primary School was closed in 2022.

Williamsport Area School District has a renowned music program, frequently ranked in the top schools in the country each year according to the NAMM Foundation.

Private schools in the area include West Branch School, Mountain View Christian School and Williamsport Christian School and several Catholic schools in Lycoming County are run by Saint John Neumann Regional Academy.

== Libraries ==
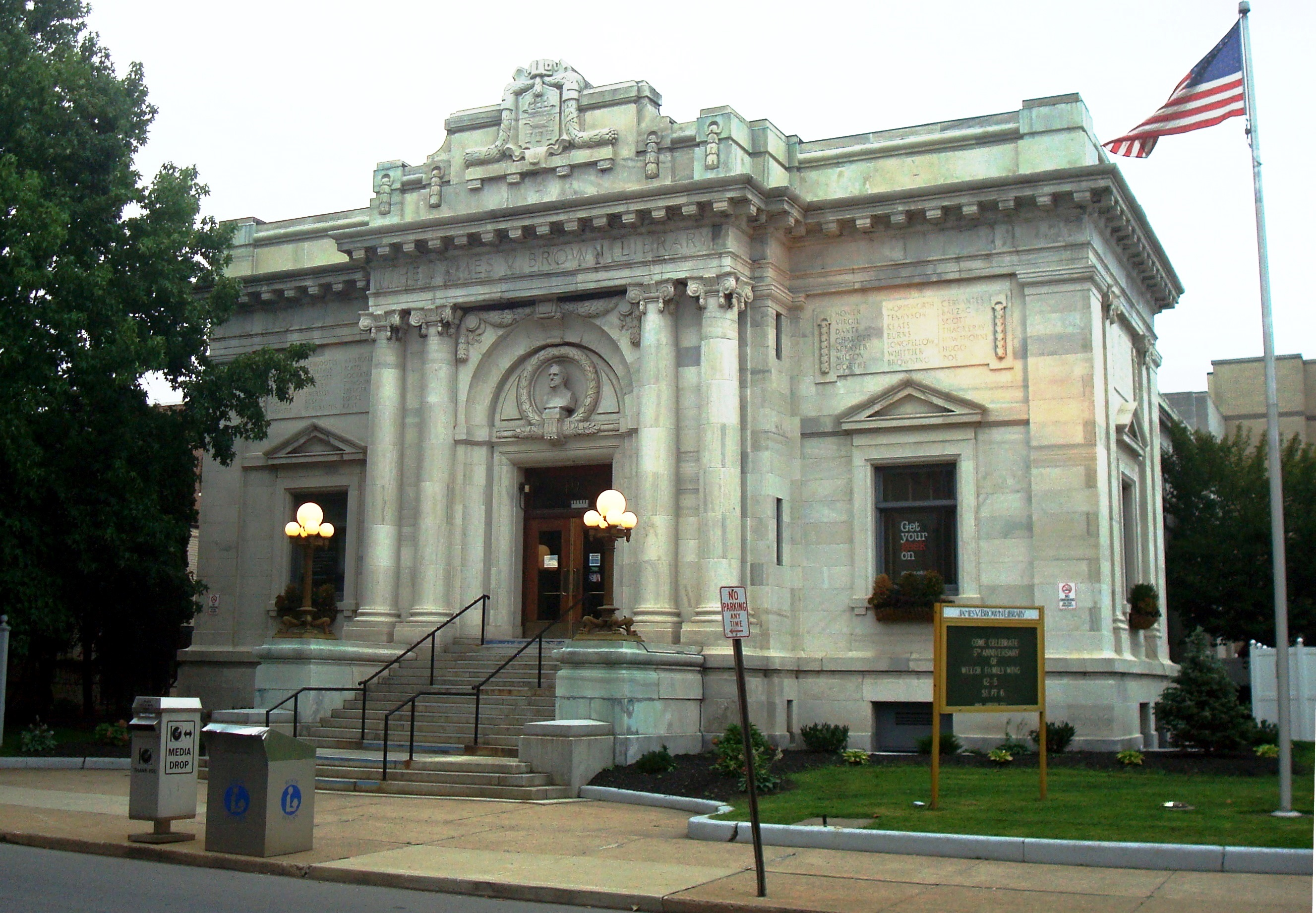
The James V. Brown Library in 2014

The James V. Brown Library is Williamsport's public library. The library has a staff of nearly 50 full and part-time employees, and offers volunteer opportunities for youth and adults. With a collection of nearly 150,000 units it offers books, DVDs, CDs, and other resources, while the library offers wireless Internet access, local history archives, and premium online reference resources. As the headquarters for the county library system, the Brown Library serves almost 87,000 patrons, some years circulating upwards of 550,000 books both in-house and through its traveling Storymobile.

The James V. Brown offers preschool and early learning opportunities, as well as programs for teens and adults. The library, led by local retired physician Dr. William R. Somers, constructed a children's wing in 2009 to target educational and social resources to young people from birth through the second grade. The library has since been able to bolster its school-age programming to include teen and tween populations, offering a variety of after-school gaming clubs, arts and crafts programs, and social events that occur on a regular basis. The library's after-school café also provides reading and study incentives for young students. The Pennsylvania Department of Education, the Office of Commonwealth Libraries, and the Bureau of Library Development funds the statewide online resource "Ask Here PA", a free chat service that provides Williamsport and other Pennsylvania library patrons with access to 24/7 reference support.

Lycoming College's Snowden Library and the Pennsylvania College of Technology's Madigan Library are also located in Williamsport.

== Hospitals ==
UPMC Susquehanna is a six hospital integrated health system including:

- UPMC Susquehanna Williamsport
- UPMC Susquehanna Divine Providence
- UPMC Susquehanna Muncy (located east of Williamsport in Muncy)
- UPMC Susquehanna Soldiers & Sailors (Wellsboro, Pennsylvania)
- UPMC Susquehanna Lock Haven (Lock Haven, Pennsylvania)
- UPMC Susquehanna Sunbury (Sunbury, Pennsylvania)

UPMC Susquehanna Williamsport was recognized as one of the 2011 Thomson Reuters 50 Top Heart Hospitals in the nation.

== Transportation ==
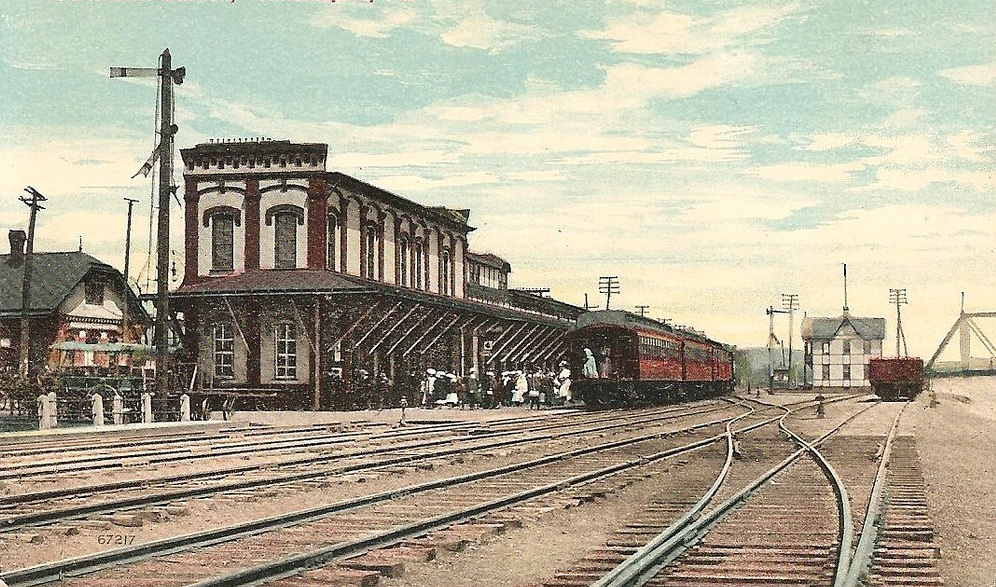
Williamsport station, c. 1910

Williamsport Regional Airport (IPT), located several miles east of the city in the borough of Montoursville, is served by Southern Airways Express with passenger flights to and from Dulles International Airport in Washington, D.C., which began in 2024. Fullington Trailways provides daily long-distance bus service from a station in the downtown to Elmira, New York, Harrisburg, New York City, and Philadelphia. Local bus service within Williamsport and to other places in Lycoming County is offered by River Valley Transit.

Williamsport is served by several major highways, including Interstate 180, U.S. Route 15, and U.S. Route 220. I-180 and US 220 run together northeast–southwest through Williamsport, and US 15 joins (in the opposite direction) for two miles. Once completed, Interstate 99 will enter Williamsport from the southwest on US 220 and continue north on US 15, joining only one at a time.

Until the mid-20th century, Williamsport was a major transfer point between the Pennsylvania Railroad (PRR) and Reading Railroad to Jersey City, New Jersey and Philadelphia, and on New York Central Railroad to Lyons, New York via Corning, New York.

The longest enduring trains service was the Buffalo Day Express to New York City, Buffalo, Harrisburg, Washington, D.C., and Philadelphia, the Dominion Express to the north, the Washington Express and Dominion Express to the south, and to the Northern Express to Erie and west, and the Southern Express, which reached southern destinations.

Freight rail service west to Avis and east to Muncy is provided by the Lycoming Valley Railroad, which has its main yard in the Newberry section of Williamsport, and offers connections to the Norfolk Southern and Canadian Pacific railroads.

The West Branch Susquehanna River is not navigable, but a dam at Hepburn Street provides a large lake for recreational boating, including outings on the mock paddlewheeler Hiawatha from Susquehanna State Park.

== Sports ==
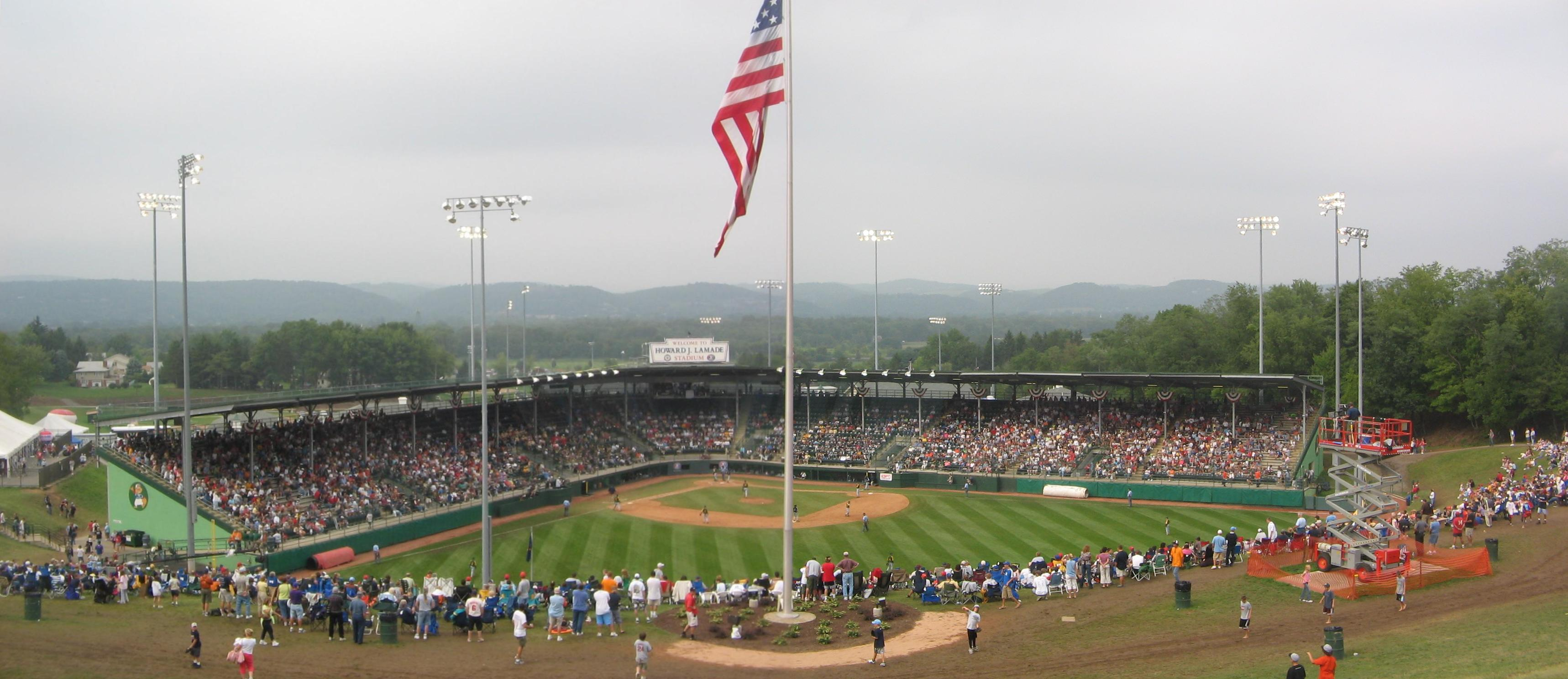
The Little League World Series is held annually at Lamade Stadium

The Williamsport Crosscutters, a collegiate summer baseball team of the MLB Draft League, play their home games at Bowman Field. Each year, the field also hosts the MLB Little League Classic.

The Little League World Series is held annually on the south side of the West Branch Susquehanna River in South Williamsport, where Little League Baseball now has its headquarters.

The Williamsport Country Club, an 18-hole A. W. Tillinghast designed course, is located in nearby Loyalsock Township. Its premier event—the WCC Invitational—features golfers from the local area and further afield in an annual tournament dating to 1928.

The Susquehanna 500 Mini Indy Gokart Racing Series was held annually in Brandon Park. During the 2014 race, a fatal crash involving one of the go-kart operators marked the end to the yearly tradition.

== Media ==
Local newspapers include the Williamsport Sun Gazette, Webb Weekly and The Williamsport Guardian.

The local news/talk radio stations are WRAK/WRKK (1400/1200 kHz), WWPA 1340 kHz and WXPI Community Radio 88.5 FM. Williamsport has an all-sports station, ESPN (AM) (1500 kHz). Williamsport is ranked #260 by Arbitron in terms of its radio market.

TV stations in Williamsport are served by the Scranton/Wilkes-Barre market.

A multiplex movie theater on West 4th Street opened May 2, 2008.

The Uptown Collective is a nonprofit school of music that frequently puts on local shows within Williamsport.

== Points of interest ==
- Clyde Peeling's Reptiland
- Little League Museum
- Genetti Hotel
- Historic Bowman Field
- Thomas T. Taber Museum & Lycoming County Historical Society
- Lycoming Mall
- Millionaires Row
- Candy Cane Lane
- Downtown Williamsport
- River Walk

== Notable people ==
- Butch Alberts, former designated hitter in Major League Baseball, played for the Toronto Blue Jays
- James Milton Black, composer of hymns, choir leader and Sunday school teacher
- Ruth Blair, silent film actress, born in Williamsport
- Gary Brown, football player and coach
- Henry Bubb, president of Capitol Federal Savings Bank
- Ernest Callenbach, writer
- Michael Capuzzo, journalist and author
- Edgar T. Collins, U.S. Army major general
- Julia C. Collins, one of the earliest published Black female novelists
- Henry Cosgrove, Roman Catholic bishop
- Alexander Cummings, third governor of the Territory of Colorado
- Allen Ertel, U.S. congressman
- Joe Fagnano, football player
- Joanna Hayes, athlete, Olympic gold medalist
- Daniel Hughes, abolitionist and conductor on the Underground Railroad
- James Hall Huling, U.S. congressman
- Alize Johnson, basketball player
- Larry Kelley, 1936 Heisman Trophy winner
- Lawrence Lessig, Roy L. Furman Professor of Law at Harvard Law School, former director of the Edmond J. Safra Center for Ethics at Harvard University, and candidate for the Democratic Party's nomination for President of the United States in the 2016 U.S. presidential election
- Harry J. Lincoln, early 1900s music publisher and composer
- Joseph Lockard (October 30, 1922 - November 2, 2012), U.S. soldier and SCR-270 radar staffer/initial, primary source of the Imperial Japanese Navy Air Service's impending attack on Pearl Harbor
- Jack Losch, football player
- George Luks, Ashcan School painter
- Henry J. Lutcher, businessman
- Tom Marino, U.S. congressman, U.S. Attorney, District Attorney
- Jamie McAndrew, MLB player for the Milwaukee Brewers
- Henry J. Messing, rabbi
- Malcolm Muir, United States district judge noted for the R. Budd Dwyer case
- Mike Mussina, member of the National Baseball Hall of Fame
- Bob Pellegrini, American football player
- H. Beam Piper, science fiction author
- Bill Reifsnyder, two-time U.S. national marathon champion
- Severin Roesen (1815? – 1872), still-life painter
- Sal Rosato, football player
- William Schreyer, financier
- H. Paul Shuch, SETI scientist
- Trisha Rae Stahl, actress
- Carl Stotz, founder of Little League Baseball
- Mary Szybist, poet, winner of the National Book Award for Poetry, 2013
- Mike Taylor, basketball coach
- Martha Dewing Woodward, artist and art teacher in Paris, Miami, and New York
- Weldon Wyckoff, baseball player
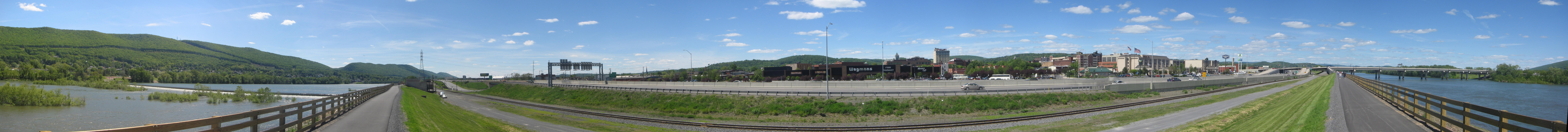
Panoramic view of South Willamsport, Duboistown and Williamsport from the River Walk on top of the flood control levee. Bald Eagle Mountain, West Branch Susquehanna River, Hepburn Street Dam on the left, center is River Walk path, Lycoming Valley Railroad, Interstate 180 and city skyline, right is Market Street Bridge over the river.

== See also ==
- Frank E. Heller Dam
- National Register of Historic Places listings in Lycoming County, Pennsylvania
