= Tough Grit – The Rural America Challenge =

Tough Grit – The Rural America Challenge is a weekly 30-minute television show produced by GRIT magazine and Berkeley Square Media, Inc. with major sponsorship provided by Tractor Supply Company, broadcast nationally on the satellite/cable channel RFD-TV. It combines expert information on rural subjects with humor to help viewers complete common rural-based DIY projects quickly, correctly, and safely. The first show premiered on September 3, 2012. It is hosted by Shannon Reilly and Caleb Reagan. Episodes are also archived for viewing at ToughGrit.com.

Each Tough Grit episode centers around a particular everyday rural farm chore, ranging from mending a fence or mucking a horse stall to grading a lane and throwing a hoe down. Contestants team up with experts from GRIT magazine and Tractor Supply Company to compete in head-to-head challenges and try to accomplish the task faster, better, and more safely than their opponents. The winner(s) can receive up to a $1,000 gift card to Tractor Supply Company. The expert from GRIT magazine is consistently Oscar H. Will III, Editor-in-Chief of GRIT magazine, while the TSC expert is a different store manager or district manager for each show.

== Episodes ==
Key

- In the No. column the number refers to the order it aired during the entire series.
- In the # column the number refers to the episode number within its season.
- The production code refers to the code assigned to the episode by the production team, which is the order in which the episode was produced, which is not necessarily the airing order.

Tough Grit season 1 episodes
No.	Air #	Title	Original release date	Prod. code
1	TG101	"The Grass is Always Greener"	September 3, 2012	TG107
Aerating and seeding a lawn. Contestants must aerate an area of lawn avoiding obstacles then seed the lawn with accuracy.
2	TG102	"If a Tree Falls in the Forrest"	September 10, 2012	TG101
Felling and climbing a tree. Contestants must fall a tree onto a target and then limb the tree in a certain amount of time.
3	TG103	"The Buck Stops Here"	September 17, 2012	TG102
Bucking and Splitting a tree. Contestants must buck the tree into equal segments then split the logs into quarters the quickest while staying safe.
4	TG104	"Good Fences Make Good Neighbors"	September 24, 2012	TG103
Post braces and gates. Contestants must dig a hole and set a post for a brace, then install a bar gate the quickest.
5	TG105	"Got a Hitch in Your Get Along?"	October 1, 2012	TG115
Hitching and pulling a trailer. Contestants must single-handedly line up a ball hitch to a trailer in the fewest attempts, then drive the trailer through an obstacle course in the shortest amount of time.
6	TG106	"FIRE!"	October 8, 2012	TG116
Installing a wood stove. Contestants must install a thru-wall chimney attached to a wood stove, light a fire, and maintain a continuous draw of smoke through the chimney.
7	TG107	"Men of Steel"	October 15, 2012	TG111
Plasma cutting and welding. Contestants must cut and weld a simple boot scraper the fastest and most accurate.
8	TG108	"Leveling the Playing Field"	October 22, 2012	TG109
Lane and field maintenance. Contestants must level a gravel lane, then cut a field of tall grass the fastest.
9	TG109	"Back in the Saddle Again"	October 29, 2012	TG112
Mucking a horse stall and saddling a horse. Contestants must properly dispose of a stall full of horse manure and then quickly saddle a horse.
10	TG110	"Time to Mend Your Ways"	November 5, 2012	TG108
Installing a solar-powered gate opener and mending a fence. Contestants must install a solar-powered automatic gate opener the fastest, then find three breaks in a barbed wire fence and mend them.
11	TG111	"Man's Best Friend"	November 12, 2012	TG117
Building a dog house and a dog run. Contestants must construct a simple wooden home for their dog, then construct a chain link dog run around it.
12	TG112	"Reach for the Sky"	November 19, 2012	TG110
Tractor Maintenance. Contestants must pressure wash a muddy tractor then service all the grease points in the shortest amount of time.
13	TG113	"The Birds and the Trees"	November 26, 2012	TG119
Planting a tree and placing several birdhouses. Contestants must dig a hole and plant a tree properly, then place appropriate birdhouses to attract bluebirds, hummingbirds, purple martin, and other wildlife.
14	TG114	"Rawhide!"	March 4, 2013	TG113
Moving and loading cattle. Contestants must herd five cows and separate them into two specified groups using chutes and sweeps, then load one of the cows onto a trailer.
