= Jamie Flick =

American politician (born c.1961)

Member of the Pennsylvania House of Representatives from the 83rd district
- Incumbent
- Assumed office January 3, 2023
- Preceded by: Jeff Wheeland

Personal details
- Born: c. 1961 Pennsylvania, U.S.
- Party: Republican
- Education: Pennsylvania College of Technology (AS)
- Alma mater: Jersey Shore Area High School
- Website: repflick.com

Jamie L. Flick (born c. 1961) is an American politician and businessman who represents the 83rd District in the Pennsylvania House of Representatives since 2023 as a member of the Republican Party.

== Early life ==
Flick was born in Pennsylvania, growing up on his family's farm in Lycoming County. He graduated from Jersey Shore Area High School in 1979. Flick earned an associate degree in software engineering from the Pennsylvania College of Technology in 1981.

== Career ==
A businessman from South Williamsport, Pennsylvania, Flick became a co-owner of the Australian baseball team the Sydney Blue Sox in 2018. Prior to his run for Pennsylvania State Representative, Flick owned and managed Susquehanna Software, a software company located in Williamsport.

In 2022, Flick ran to represent the open 83rd District seat in the Pennsylvania House of Representatives. He defeated fellow Republican Ann Kaufman in the primary election and won the general election unopposed.

In 2023, Flick was the lone Republican co-sponsor on a bill to recognize same-sex marriage at the state level.

Flick currently sits on the State House's Children & Youth, Government Oversight, and Human Services Committees.

== Electoral history ==
2022 Pennsylvania House of Representatives Republican primary election, District 83
Party	Candidate	Votes	%
Republican	Jamie Flick	4,146	50.95
Republican	Ann Kaufman	3,975	48.85
Write-in		16	0.20
Total votes		8,137	100.00

2022 Pennsylvania House of Representatives election, District 83
Party	Candidate	Votes	%
Republican	Jamie Flick	16,835	93.83
Write-in		1,107	6.17
Total votes		17,942	100.00

2024 Pennsylvania House of Representatives election, District 83
Party	Candidate	Votes	%
Republican	Jamie Flick (incumbent)	Unopposed	
Total votes		23,285	100.00
