= Kathryn Wentzel Lumley =

American educator and children's book author

- Born: c. 1918; United States
- Died: July 18, 2008; Rauchtown, Pennsylvania, United States
- Occupations: A founding director of Reading Is Fundamental and former chair of the Pennsylvania College of Technology board of trustees (1980s)
- Known for: Eponym, Kathryn Wentzel Lumley Aviation Center

Kathryn Wentzel Lumley (c. 1918 – July 18, 2008) was an American educator and children's book author during the twenty and twenty-first centuries. A founding director of Reading Is Fundamental, one of the largest literacy improvement movements in the United States, she also chaired the board of trustees of the Williamsport Area Community College (now the Pennsylvania College of Technology) in Williamsport, Pennsylvania, and became the eponym for the Kathryn Wentzel Lumley Aviation Center in Montoursville, Pennsylvania.

== Formative years, teaching years and later life ==
Born circa 1918, Lumley was employed as a reading specialist and began writing books for children during the 1960s. In 1966, she served as the director of the Reading Clinic for the public school system in Washington, D.C. It was during this same period of her life that she became a co-founder of Reading Is Fundamental, a literacy improvement organization that has since become the oldest and largest children's literacy organization in the United States.

In later life, she resided in Rauchtown, Pennsylvania during the 1970s and in Jersey Shore, Pennsylvania during the 1990s. During the early 2000s, she resided again in Rauchtown.

== Career ==
During the early 1970s, she collaborated with cartoonist Charles M. Schulz, the creator of Peanuts, on the children's book, Snoopy's Secret Code Book, which was published by Holt, Rinehart and Winston in 1971.

Joining the board of trustees at the Williamsport Area Community College (now the Pennsylvania College of Technology) in 1978, she was appointed as that board's vice chair and chair in 1984 and 1985, respectively. A member of the board when that community college was granted affiliate status with the Pennsylvania State University system in 1989, she continued to hold that board position after the college's status and name change until she retired in April 2002.

=== Publications ===
- Fradin, Dennis Brindell and Kathryn Lumley. District of Columbia in Words and Pictures: Young People's Stories of Our States. Danbury, Connecticut: Children's Press/Scholastic, February 1981. ISBN 0516039512
- Lumley, Kay and Kathryn Wentzel Lumley. I Can Be an Animal Doctor. Danbury, Connecticut: Children's Press/Scholastic, January 1985. ISBN 051641836X
- Lumley, Kathryn. New True Books: Monkeys and Apes. Danbury, Connecticut: Children's Press/Scholastic, January 1988. ISBN 0516416332
- Lumley, Kathryn. The Fish Who Weren’t & Other Stories. Chicago, Illinois: Lyons and Carnahan, January 1969. ISBN 051641836X
- Lumley, Kathryn. The Unwilling Witch and Other Stories. Chicago, Illinois: Lyons and Carnahan, 1969.
- Lumley, Kathryn. Work Animals. Danbury, Connecticut: Children's Press/Scholastic: January 1983. ISBN 051601711X
- Schultz, Charles M. and Kathryn Wentzel Lumley. Snoopy's Secret Code Book. New York, New York: Holt, Rinehart and Winston, 1971. ISBN 0030860695

=== Awards and other honors ===
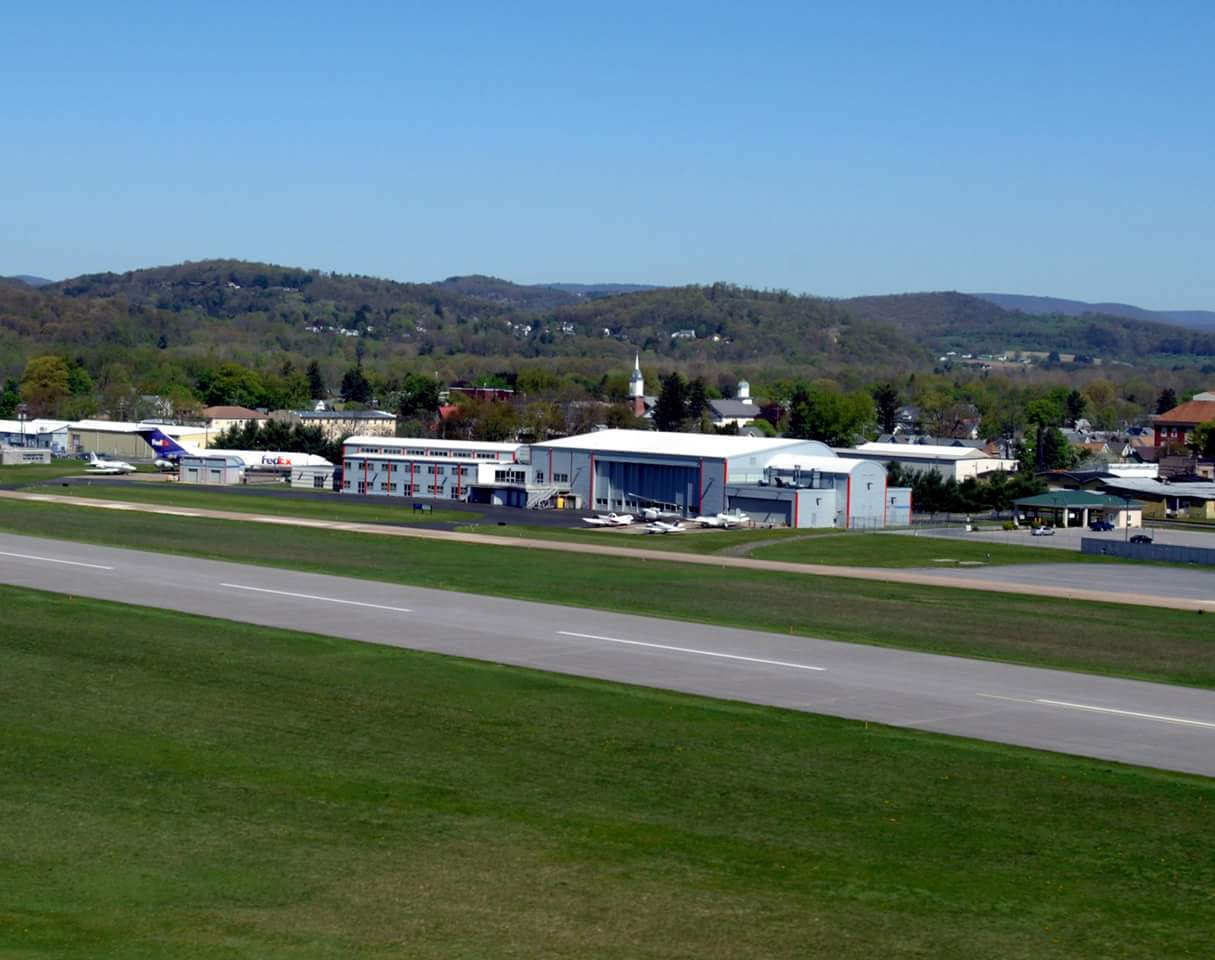
The Kathryn Wentzel Lumley Aviation Center, 2015

The Penn College Foundation honored Lumley for her service to the Pennsylvania College of Technology by naming a $100,000 endowed chair after her in 1989. The college then also honored her in 1993, when it named its aviation training center after her. Known as the Kathryn Wentzel Lumley Aviation Center, the center's new $6.5 million centerpiece building was dedicated on June 25, 1993, during a dedication ceremony at which Lumley and college president Robert Breuder delivered addresses. It became known as "one of the largest and most advanced aviation instructional facilities in the Northeast."

== Death ==
Lumley died at her residence in Rauchtown on July 18, 2008. She was ninety years old.
