= Community Chickens =

American agricultural magazine

- Editor: Taylor Miller
- Frequency: Weekly
- Publisher: Bryan Welch
- Founded: 2009
- Company: Ogden Publications
- Country: United States
- Based in: Topeka, Kansas
- Language: English
- Website: www.communitychickens.com

Community Chickens is a joint Mother Earth News and Grit online magazine published by Ogden Publications in Topeka, Kansas. It was created by Oscar H. Will III, Cheryl Long, Bryan Welch, and Taylor Miller in 2009.

== What it does ==
The site featured original work by well-known chicken bloggers on a variety of poultry-related topics for small and urban farmers, primarily DIY-related articles, sweepstakes, health-related articles, and recipes. The variety of issues covered aimed to help readers fight for the right to raise chickens in their communities in order to live more sustainable, green-friendly lives. To this end, Community Chickens released a free, weekly newsletter to subscribers every Tuesday morning.

The website was shuttered during the 2020 pandemic. During that year, Ogden Publications acquired several titles from Swift Publications, including Backyard Poultry magazine. Content from Community Chickens was gradually moved to the Backyard Poultry website. As of 2023, Backyard Poultry magazine publishes articles on incubating, housing, feeding, and caring for chickens, ducks, geese, quail, geese, and other fowl.

== Related magazines ==
Subsequent to Community Chickens, Ogden Publications created and launched another online magazine dedicated to beekeeping called Keeping Backyard Bees in 2014, follow the next year by Herbal Living and Homestead Hustle. All four sites were shuttered in 2020.
