= Kathy Gehrt =

Kathy Gehrt is an American author known for writing Discover Cooking with Lavender.

== Works ==
Discover Cooking with Lavender is a cookbook with recipes using culinary lavender. It contains 75 recipes for sugars, seasonings, drinks, savory creations and more. It was published by Florentia Press in 2010 and is in its second edition. Her articles appeared in Mother Earth News, Seattle Farmers Market Alliance's Market News, and The Gilded Fork.

Articles in The Oregonian, The Seattle Times, the Seattle Post-Intelligencer, and the Sequim Gazette reference Gehrt's book and expertise.

== Awards ==
The United States Lavender Growers Association presented Gehrt with its LIFT Award on March 26, 2014 for her writing, sharing, teaching and contributing to the lavender industry.
