= BackHome =

Defunct magazine

BackHome was a magazine that was created in 1990 as a competitor to Mother Earth News after the latter was taken over by a major publisher (and then, ultimately, Ogden Publications). Richard Freudenberger is the co-founder of BackHome. Following the earlier, simpler, style of Mother Earth News, it became a strong competitor in the homesteading and simple living tutorial and instructional print market. The headquarters was in East Flat Rock, North Carolina. It was formerly based in Hendersonville, North Carolina.

The magazine was subtitled "Your Hands-On Guide To Sustainable Living".

According to its website, BackHome ceased print publication in 2014.

== See also ==
Similar periodicals

- Backwoods Home Magazine
- Grit
- Natural Life
