= Oscar H. Will III =

American journalist, writer and magazine editor

Oscar H. Will III (born October 6, 1956), also known as Hank Will, is an American journalist, writer, and magazine editor.

As editor of Grit magazine (and contributing editor of Natural Home and Garden), he writes a blog, The Daily Commute, that covers a wide variety of topics related to rural living. He came up with the idea for Community Chickens, a website that brings together information about raising chickens. It draws its contents from Grit and Mother Earth News magazine. Will is also the author of four books on vintage farm machinery: Cub Cadet: the first 45 Years; PayLine: International Harvester's Construction Equipment Division; the Farmall Regular, F-Series Collector's Originality Guide; and Garden Tractors: Deere, Cub Cadet, Wheel Horse, and All the Rest, 1930s to Current. Hank also wrote a fifth book, Plowing With Pigs, with his wife Karen Keb Will.

== Agricultural background ==
Will started his career in agriculture while working toward advanced scientific degrees at the University of Chicago. An article in Mother Earth News magazine inspired Will and his wife to grow and sell alfalfa sprouts to individuals, stores and food-buying co-ops in Chicago in the 1970s and early 1980s. Each week, they sold several hundred pounds from their South Side apartment. Will was also a partner in a small food-purchasing and trucking company that served neighborhood co-ops, several coffee shops and restaurants in the Hyde Park area.

Will and his family later put their rural Harrisburg, South Dakota, farm to work with four acres of native perennials, a nursery containing thousands of trees and shrubs, cut flower gardens, berries and rhubarb. The family marketed the bulk of their production through the Downtown Sioux Falls Farmers Market. During their final years in South Dakota, Will and his wife co-chaired the enterprise.

Will also raised several thousand free-range broilers annually from that South Dakota location, selling them through direct marketing. The family's laying flock supplied thousands of donated eggs year-round to the Banquet, a Sioux Falls feeding ministry, and other local food charities. Another of their poultry projects supplied hundreds of pounds of free-range turkey to the Banquet and Sioux Falls Food Pantry during the holiday season.

Will currently pastures Mulefoot hogs and Highland cattle, keeps a flock of chickens and turkeys, and grows a large food garden on his Osage County, Kansas, farm. He is an experienced grazier who favors low-stress, intensive management of animals, pastures and hay meadows. He believes in improving soils and the pasture matrix by carefully timing the frequency and duration of animal grazing.

He managed a herd of purebred Angus cattle in Ohio, consisting of about 150 head in a year. He was also involved with native prairie restoration projects in Ohio and native prairie management in South Dakota. The Ohio cattle farm was recognized for exemplary herd and forage management and clean water, and it was included on the Heart of Ohio Tour in the late 1990s.

== Writing and editorial career ==
Hank Will has written five books, more than 30 peer-reviewed scientific articles and hundreds of magazine articles about vintage machinery. His books include PayLine: International Harvester's Construction Equipment Division; Cub Cadet: The First 45 Years; the Farmall Regular and F-Series Collector's Originality Guide; and Garden Tractors: Deere, Cub Cadet, Wheel Horse, and All the Rest, 1930s to Current. He has professed a fondness for 1970s vintage single-cylinder Kohler engines, Cub Cadet garden tractors and International Harvester equipment of all kinds.

He has served as editor of Grit since April 2, 2007. Grit is a bi-monthly magazine distributed throughout the United States and Canada that focuses on country lifestyles, community and stewardship.

== Works ==
Cub Cadet: The first 45 Years. Nebraska: Hain Publishing. 2005.

PayLine: International Harvester's Construction Equipment Division. St. Paul, Minnesota: MBI Publishing. 2006. ISBN 0760324581.

Farmall Regular and F-Series Collector's Originality Guide. St. Paul, Minnesota: MBI Publishing. 2007. ISBN 0760327513.

Garden Tractors: Deere, Cub Cadet, Wheel Horse, and All the Rest, 1930s to Current. St. Paul, Minnesota: Voyageur Press. 2009. ISBN 0760331960.

Plowing With Pigs and Other Creative Low-Budget Home Solutions. New Society Publishers. 2013. ISBN 0865717176.
