= Penn College =

Penn College may refer to two post-secondary schools in the United States:

- William Penn University, a private university in Iowa previously called Penn College
- Pennsylvania College of Technology, a college affiliated with the Pennsylvania State University whose name is commonly abbreviated to Penn College

== See also ==
- University of Pennsylvania, an Ivy-League university located in Philadelphia
- Pennsylvania State University, a state-related land-grant university located in State College, Pennsylvania
- Gettysburg College, a private liberal arts college located in Gettysburg, Pennsylvania, founded as "Pennsylvania College"
