= Jeff Wheeland =

American politician

Member of the Pennsylvania House of Representatives from the 83rd district
- In office January 6, 2015 – January 3, 2023
- Preceded by: Richard Mirabito
- Succeeded by: Jamie Flick

Personal details
- Born: October 1957 (age 68–69) Williamsport, Pennsylvania, U.S.
- Party: Republican
- Children: 4
- Education: Pennsylvania College of Technology; Lycoming College

Jeff Wheeland (born October 1957) is a member of the Pennsylvania House of Representatives, representing the 83rd House district in Lycoming County, Pennsylvania.

== Political career ==
Wheeland currently sits on the Appropriations, Liquor Control, Local Government, and State Government committees.
