= Rauchtown =

Rauchtown may refer to:

- Rauchtown Run or Rauchtown Creek, a tributary of the West Branch Susquehanna River in Clinton and Lycoming Counties, Pennsylvania
- Rauchtown, Pennsylvania, a community in Clinton and Lycoming Counties, Pennsylvania
