= Michael R. Rafferty =

American politician

Michael Rafferty

Mayor of Williamsport
- In office 2000–2004
- Preceded by: Steven W. Cappelli
- Succeeded by: Mary B. Wolf

Personal details
- Education: Pennsylvania College of Technology; Mount St. Mary's College

Michael R. Rafferty is an American politician and journalist who served as an editor of Grit and mayor of Williamsport, Pennsylvania from 2000 to 2004.

== Early life and education ==
Rafferty, a native of Williamsport, graduated from Pennsylvania College of Technology in 1971 and Mount St. Mary's College in Emmitsburg, Maryland in 1973.

== Career ==
Rafferty worked for Williamsport newspapers starting in 1973, and became the editor of Grit in 1985. He served in that capacity until Stauffer Communications Inc. moved Grit from Williamsport to Topeka, Kansas in 1993. While in that editorial leadership position, the newspaper was known as both a Lycoming County cheerleader, and a solid representation of a very large region, in which Sunday GRIT was the only Sunday publication. He served on Williamsport City Council nine years, including six as council president, before becoming mayor in 2000. Since leaving office in 2004, Rafferty has worked in his family photo processing and graphics design business (Vannucci Foto & Video) and as editor of a local weekly newspaper, Webb Weekly. He retired from Webb Weekly in 2013. He and his wife retired and passed their business on to their son Ryan Rafferty in 2016.

== Personal life ==
Rafferty is married to Patricia Rafferty (née Roth), with whom he has five children, ten grandchildren and one great grandchild.

Political offices
Preceded by Steven W. Cappelli	Mayor of Williamsport, Pennsylvania; 2000–2004	Succeeded by Mary B. Wolf
