= Derek Slaughter =

American politician

Mayor of Williamsport
- Incumbent
- Assumed office January 6, 2020
- Preceded by: Gabriel J. Campana

Personal details
- Born: 1981 (age 44–45) Williamsport, Pennsylvania, U.S.
- Party: Democratic
- Spouse: Vanessa Slaughter (m. 2011)
- Children: 3
- Education: Pennsylvania State University B.S. University of Maryland M.S.

Derek J. Slaughter (born 1981) is an American politician who is the mayor of Williamsport, Pennsylvania, the first African-American to hold the position. Prior to this, Slaughter served as city councilman and taught mathematics at Pennsylvania College of Technology.

== Early life ==
Slaughter was born and raised in Williamsport, Pennsylvania. He attended Williamsport Area High School where he graduated in 1999. In 2003 Slaughter graduated with a bachelor's degree in Information Science and Technology and a minor in Spanish language. He then attended the University of Maryland, College Park where he obtained a Masters in Education. Slaughter returned to Williamsport where he taught mathematics at Williamsport Area High School and the Pennsylvania College of Technology. He also coached Williamsport Area High School girls basketball from 2007 until 2016. Slaughter continued to teach high school and college courses throughout his campaign for mayor.

== Mayor of Williamsport ==
In March 2019, Slaughter announced he'd be running for mayor as a Democrat. On November 6, 2019, it was announced Slaughter had won the 2019 election for mayor. He decided to end his teaching career after winning the election. On January 6, 2020, Slaughter was officially sworn in and assumed office as the mayor of Williamsport. Slaughter was re-elected in 2023.

== Personal life ==
Slaughter has one son and two daughters. He has been married to his wife, Vanessa Slaughter, since 2016. Derek's mother is Judy Slaughter.

== See also ==
- List of mayors of Williamsport, Pennsylvania
- List of first African-American mayors
