= Lumley Aviation Center =

Coordinates: 41.245708°N 76.922600°W

Kathryn Wentzel Lumley Aviation Center
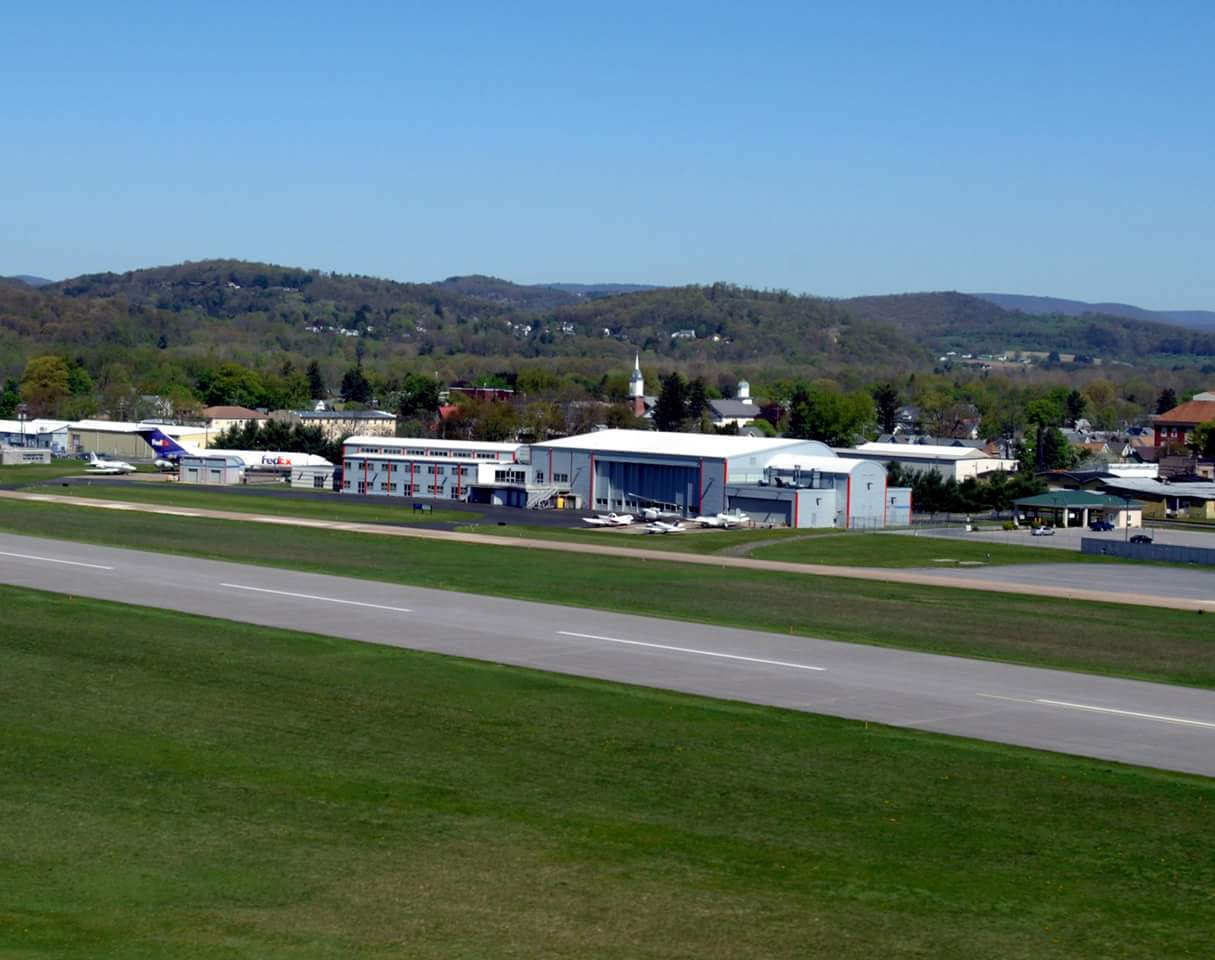
- Lumley Aviation Center as seen from landing aircraft at IPT
- Interactive map of the Kathryn Wentzel Lumley Aviation Center area

General information
- Status: Operational
- Location: Montoursville, Pennsylvania, 500 Airport Road, Montoursville, PA 17754
- Opened: 1993

Technical details
- Floor area: Total: 50,000 sq. ft Hangar: 11,000 sq. ft

Website
- Official website

The Kathryn Wentzel Lumley Aviation Center, known simply as Lumley Aviation Center, is a private college aviation center in the United States. A branch of the Pennsylvania College of Technology, which focuses on aeronautical studies, this center is located roughly seven miles from the college's main campus, on the grounds of Williamsport Regional Airport in Montoursville, Pennsylvania. Plans for the center were announced in 1991.

The center's first courses were presented in 1993. It currently offers full Federal Aviation Administration (FAA) and transport-certified repair and maintenance programs.

== History ==
In 1991, the Pennsylvania College of Technology announced its plans to expand its aviation education facilities in response to a growing need for certified repair and maintenance training programs for current and future aviation industry employees. Construction work began on the center's new 50,000-square-foot building in 1993, which cost $6.5 million and was described as "a contemporary building with a gray metallic and red exterior and a red, black and white interior decor." Dedicated on June 25, 1993, during a ceremony that included addresses by college president Robert Breuder and Kathryn Wentzel Lumley, a member of the college's board of directors and co-founder of the nationwide literacy improvement program, Reading Is Fundamental, the new building featured avionics and composite materials laboratories, an "engine demonstration area" with "remote control video cameras," an 11,000-square-foot hangar, and a sheet metal shop, making it "one of the largest and most advanced aviation instructional facilities in the Northeast."

In 2000, Dr. Francis M. Powers Jr. and William T. Castle donated a "single-engine, retractable-gear, Velocity airplane" for instructional use. Built in 1994, using composite materials, the plane had just eighty-five hours of flying time when it was acquired by the college, and was valued at $137,000.

In 2007, the private college's aviation center was renamed as the Kathryn Wentzel Lumley Aviation Center, in honor of Kathryn W. Lumley.

In December 2009, a UH-1H from the American Helicopter Museum was transported to the campus for restoration.

FedEx Express subsequently donated a Boeing 727 to the university in 2010. The center currently offers training in the repair and maintenance of that Boeing 727, as well as two Cessna 172s.

== See also ==
- Pennsylvania College of Technology
- Williamsport Regional Airport
