= Pennsylvania House of Representatives, District 83 =

American legislative district

Pennsylvania's 83rd State House of Representatives district
Representative
Jamie Flick; R–South Williamsport
- Population (2022): 63,798

The 83rd Pennsylvania House of Representatives District is located in central Pennsylvania and has been represented by Jamie Flick since 2023.

== District profile ==
The 83rd District is located in Lycoming County and Union County and includes the following areas:

Lycoming County

- Armstrong Township
- Brady Township
- Clinton Township
- Duboistown
- Loyalsock Township
- Montgomery
- South Williamsport
- Susquehanna Township
- Williamsport
- Washington Township

Union County

- Gregg Township
- White Deer Township

== Representatives ==
Representative	Party	Years	District home	Note
Prior to 1969, seats were apportioned by county.
Robert C. Wise	Democrat	1969 – 1974		
Anthony J. Cimini	Republican	1975 – 1988		Died on August 25, 1987
Thomas W. Dempsey	Republican	1987 – 2000		Elected in November 1987
Steven W. Cappelli	Republican	2001 – 2008	Williamsport	Vacated seat to run for Pennsylvania Senate
Richard Mirabito	Democrat	2009 – 2014	Williamsport	
Jeff Wheeland	Republican	2015 – 2023	Loyalsock Township	
Jamie Flick	Republican	2023 – present	South Williamsport	Incumbent

== Recent election results ==
PA House election, 2024: Pennsylvania House, District 83
Party	Candidate	Votes	%
Republican	Jamie Flick (incumbent)	Unopposed	
Total votes		23,285	100.00
Republican hold			

PA House election, 2022: Pennsylvania House, District 83
Party	Candidate	Votes	%
Republican	Jamie Flick	Unopposed	
Total votes		16,835	100.00
Republican hold			

PA House election, 2020: Pennsylvania House, District 83
Party	Candidate	Votes	%
Republican	Jeff Wheeland (incumbent)	19,065	67.32
Democratic	Airneezer Page-Delahaye	9,253	32.68
Total votes		28,318	100.00
Republican hold			

PA House election, 2018: Pennsylvania House, District 83
Party	Candidate	Votes	%
Republican	Jeff Wheeland (incumbent)	13,108	65.94
Democratic	Airneezer Page-Delahaye	6,771	34.06
Total votes		19,879	100.00
Republican hold			

PA House election, 2016: Pennsylvania House, District 83
Party	Candidate	Votes	%
Republican	Jeff Wheeland (incumbent)	Unopposed	
Total votes		19,901	100.00
Republican hold			
