= Steven W. Cappelli =

American politician

Member of the Pennsylvania House of Representatives from the 83rd district
- In office January 2, 2001 – November 30, 2008
- Preceded by: Thomas W. Dempsey
- Succeeded by: Richard Mirabito

Mayor of Williamsport, Pennsylvania
- In office 1996–2000
- Preceded by: Michael R. Rafferty
- Succeeded by: Phillip E. Preziosi

Personal details
- Born: November 8, 1963 (age 62) Scranton, Pennsylvania
- Party: Republican
- Spouse: Erin Cappelli
- Education: Pennsylvania State University

Steven W. Cappelli (born November 8, 1963) is a former Republican member of the Pennsylvania House of Representatives, representing the 83rd District for four terms from 2001 to 2009. He and his wife live in Williamsport, Pennsylvania. He did not run for re-election to the Pennsylvania House in 2008, choosing to instead run for the Republican party nomination for State Senator in the 23rd District. Cappelli lost the primary to Eugene Yaw, who was elected to the State Senate in the November 2008 General Election. Cappelli was succeeded in the Pennsylvania House by Democrat Richard Mirabito.

In February, 2009, he accepted a position as a regional vice president with Henry Dunn Inc headquartered in Towanda, PA. In May 2010, he narrowly lost the Republican nomination for the 83rd District of the Pennsylvania House, with 2,904 votes to David Huffman's 3,086. Capelli said of his loss, "It's probably the end of my elected public office career, I don't see myself running for office in the future."

Political offices
| Preceded by Phillip E. Preziosi | Mayor of Williamsport, Pennsylvania; 1996-2000 | Succeeded by Michael R. Rafferty |
