= Robert C. Wise =

American politician (1925–2024)

Member of the Pennsylvania House of Representatives from the 83rd district
- In office 1969–1974
- Preceded by: Position established
- Succeeded by: Anthony J. Cimini

Member of the Pennsylvania House of Representatives from the Lycoming County district
- In office 1965–1968

Personal details
- Born: Robert Campbell Wise; May 21, 1925 Williamsport, Pennsylvania, U.S.
- Died: September 3, 2024 (aged 99) Montoursville, Pennsylvania, U.S.
- Party: Democratic

Robert Campbell Wise (May 21, 1925 – September 3, 2024) was an American politician who was a Democratic member of the Pennsylvania House of Representatives.

Born on May 21, 1925, Wise died on September 3, 2024, at the age of 99.
