= Anthony Cimini =

American politician

Anthony J. Cimini

Member of the Pennsylvania House of Representatives from the 83rd district
- In office 1975 – August 25, 1987
- Preceded by: Robert C. Wise
- Succeeded by: Thomas W. Dempsey

Personal details
- Born: February 12, 1922
- Died: August 25, 1987 (aged 65)
- Party: Republican

Anthony J. Cimini (February 12, 1922 – August 25, 1987) was a Republican member of the Pennsylvania House of Representatives.
