= Mary B. Wolf =

American politician

Mayor of Williamsport
- In office 2004 – January 18, 2008
- Preceded by: Michael R. Rafferty
- Succeeded by: Gabriel J. Campana

Personal details
- Party: Republican

Mary B. Wolf was the second female mayor of City of Williamsport, Pennsylvania in the United States, serving from 2004 to 2008.

== Mayoral history ==
In her second attempt for mayor, Wolf was elected in 2004. She had previously served for eight years on the city council and at the time taught political science at Lycoming College in Williamsport.

Wolf lost her first election for mayor to Michael R. Rafferty in 2001 when Mayor Steven W. Cappelli resigned to take his post in the Pennsylvania House of Representatives. In her second run for mayor, Wolf defeated Rafferty for the Republican nomination despite him being endorsed by the County Republican Party.

In office, Wolf focused her administration on crime and curfew-related policies. She reinstated the Director of Public Safety position at that time.

Wolf was defeated in the 2007 primary election by the Republican challenger Gabriel J. Campana. Campana was endorsed by the County Republican Party.

Wolf is a former member of the Mayors Against Illegal Guns Coalition. Her split from the mayor's group was well-publicized.

Wolf is married to Michael Wolf. They have two grown children, Patrick and Peggy.

Political offices
Preceded by Michael R. Rafferty	Mayor of Williamsport, Pennsylvania; 2004–2008	Succeeded by Gabriel J. Campana
