= Gabriel J. Campana =

American politician

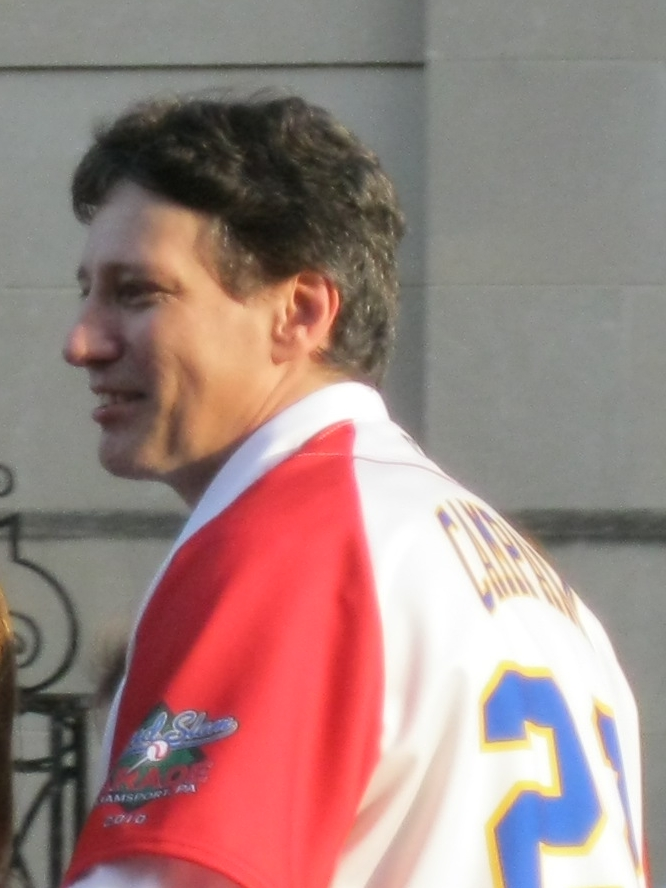
- Campana at the Little League Grand Slam Parade 2011

Mayor of Williamsport
- In office January 18, 2008 – January 6, 2020
- Preceded by: Mary B. Wolf
- Succeeded by: Derek Slaughter

Personal details
- Born: Williamsport, Pennsylvania
- Party: Republican

Gabriel J. Campana is an American politician. He served as the 39th mayor of Williamsport, Pennsylvania. He assumed office in January 2008 and won re-elections in 2011 and 2015 before leaving in 2020. On October 7, 2019, he announced that he was running a write-in campaign for mayor in the November election.

== Political career ==
Campana has been the mayor of Williamsport, Pennsylvania since 2008. He won re-election in 2011 by a 74% to 26% margin.

Campana is a supporter of fracking and the natural gas industry. He purchased a natural gas-powered car, but ended up getting rid of it since it wasn't economical.

== Allegations ==
After a July 8 incident, Sonia C. Campana filed a temporary protection from abuse order against Gabriel Campana on August 1, 2016. Campana's wife claims he was physically and sexually abusive. This court order was dismissed upon request while a similar provision is found within a custody agreement.

In an October 15, 2020 complaint filed in U.S. Middle District Court, Williamsport Police Sergeant Jody Miller alleged that Campana attempted to misuse his position to influence a personal legal matter and he later retaliated against him for exposing corruption within the police department. Miller, who played a key role in reform efforts targeting overtime fraud and mismanagement, claimed Campana reversed his stance on reform under political pressure and engineered a hostile work environment after appointing a different police chief. The suit named several city officials as co-defendants and outlines a pattern of harassment and retaliation, including being passed over for promotions and subjected to workplace hostility. Miller sought a jury trial, over $75,000 in damages, and other relief.

== Personal life ==
Campana is one of 11 siblings born and raised in Williamsport. His father, the late Dr. Louis F. Campana, was a local physician and his late mother Rose Campana, was a nurse. He attended St. Alban's Prep School in Washington, D.C., has been a Visiting College professor, is a graduate of Temple University, and has a doctorate degree. He is an author of three books, has a podcast, and is an economic development consultant.

Campana currently serves as a corrections officer.

Political offices
| Preceded by Mary B. Wolf | Mayor of Williamsport, Pennsylvania; 2008–2020 | Succeeded by Derek Slaughter |
