= Thomas W. Dempsey =

American politician (1931–2024)

Member of the Pennsylvania House of Representatives from the 83rd district
- In office November 17, 1987 – November 30, 2000
- Preceded by: Anthony J. Cimini
- Succeeded by: Steven W. Cappelli

Personal details
- Born: January 23, 1931 Williamsport, Pennsylvania, U.S.
- Died: March 7, 2024 (aged 93) Montoursville, Pennsylvania, U.S.
- Party: Republican
- Spouse: Nina L.
- Education: Lycoming College
- Occupation: Legislator

Thomas W. Dempsey (January 23, 1931 – March 7, 2024) was an American politician who served as a Republican member of the Pennsylvania House of Representatives.

== Life and career ==
Dempsey graduated from Williamsport High School in Lycoming County, Pennsylvania, in 1948 and from Lycoming College in 1952. He was elected to represent the 83rd legislative district in November 1987, following the death of fellow Republican Anthony J. Cimini, a position he held until his retirement prior to the 2000 elections.

In 2001, he received the Angela R. Kyte Outstanding Alumnus Award from Lycoming College.

Dempsey died in Montoursville, Pennsylvania on March 7, 2024, at the age of 93.
