= Jersey Shore Area School District =

Public school district in Pennsylvania

Jersey Shore Area School District JSASD
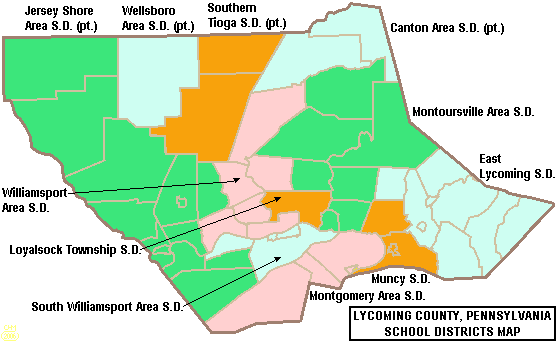

Address
- 175 A&P Drive Jersey Shore, Lycoming County and Clinton County, Pennsylvania, 17740; United States of America

District information
- Type: Public

Other information
- Website: www.jsasd.org

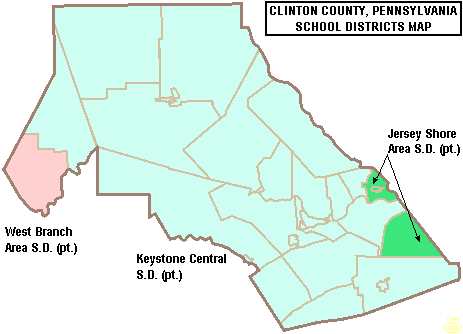
Map of Clinton County, Pennsylvania Public School Districts

The Jersey Shore Area School District is a large rural, American, public school district that is located in Lycoming County, Pennsylvania and Clinton County, Pennsylvania. The district, which encompasses approximately 385 square miles (1,000 km^{2}), is centered on the borough of Jersey Shore and serves the surrounding Lycoming County municipalities of Limestone Township, Bastress Township, Nippenose Township, Porter Township, Piatt Township, Anthony Township, Mifflin Township, Watson Township, Cummings Township, McHenry Township, Brown Township, and Salladasburg.

It also encompasses Avis, Pine Creek Township, and Crawford Township in Clinton County.

It is one of the 500 public school districts of Pennsylvania.

== History ==
The district was organized in 1966 by a consolidation of eleven smaller school districts. Per the 2000 US Census Bureau data, Jersey Shore Area School District served a resident population of 19,807. According to 2010 state census data, Jersey Shore Area School District served a resident population of 17,858. The educational attainment levels for the Jersey Shore Area School District population (25 years old and over) were 86.8% high school graduates and 13.7% college graduates.

According to the Pennsylvania Budget and Policy Center, 41.3% of the district's pupils lived at 185% or below the Federal Poverty Level as shown by their eligibility for the federal free or reduced price school meal programs in 2012. In 2009, the district residents’ per capita income was $16,201, while the median family income was $41,792. In the Commonwealth, the median family income was $49,501 and the United States median family income was $49,445, in 2010. In Lycoming County, the median household income was $45,430. By 2013, the median household income in the United States rose to $52,100. In 2014, the median household income in the USA was $53,700.

The Jersey Shore Area School District operates five schools: Avis Elementary School, Jersey Shore Elementary School, Salladasburg Elementary School, Jersey Shore Area Middle School (6-8), and Jersey Shore Area High School (9-12). The district has a separate administration building. Nippenose Elementary School was closed in 2013 due to declining enrollment. No publicly funded technology and career school is available to students.

The BLaST Intermediate Unit IU17 provides the district with a wide variety of services like specialized education for disabled students and hearing, background checks for employees, state mandated recognizing and reporting child abuse training, speech and visual disability services and criminal background check processing for prospective employees and professional development for staff and faculty.

== Closed schools ==
Nippenose Valley Elementary School was located at 7190 South Route 44 Highway, Williamsport. The school was closed in June 2013 due to low enrollment. On closure, the school had an enrollment of just 195 pupils in grades kindergarten through 5th. In 2015, the school board sold the building at auction for $470,000. The board insisted one term of the sale was that the building could never be used as an educational facility.

== Extracurriculars ==
The district offers a wide variety of clubs, activities and sports.

=== Sports ===
The district funds:

Boys

- Baseball – AAA
- Basketball – AAA
- Cross country – AA
- Football – AAAA
- Golf – AAA
- Soccer – AA
- Swimming and diving – AA
- Tennis – AA
- Track and field – AAA
- Wrestling - AAA

Girls

- Basketball – AAA
- Cross country – AA
- Golf – AAA
- Soccer – AA
- Softball – AAA
- Swimming and diving – AA
- Tennis – AAA
- Track and field – AAA

Junior high school sports

Boys

- Basketball
- Cross country
- Football
- Soccer
- Track and field
- Wrestling

Girls

- Basketball
- Cross country
- Soccer
- Softball
- Track and field

- According to PIAA directory July 2012
