= Ravensburg State Park =

State park in Pennsylvania, United States

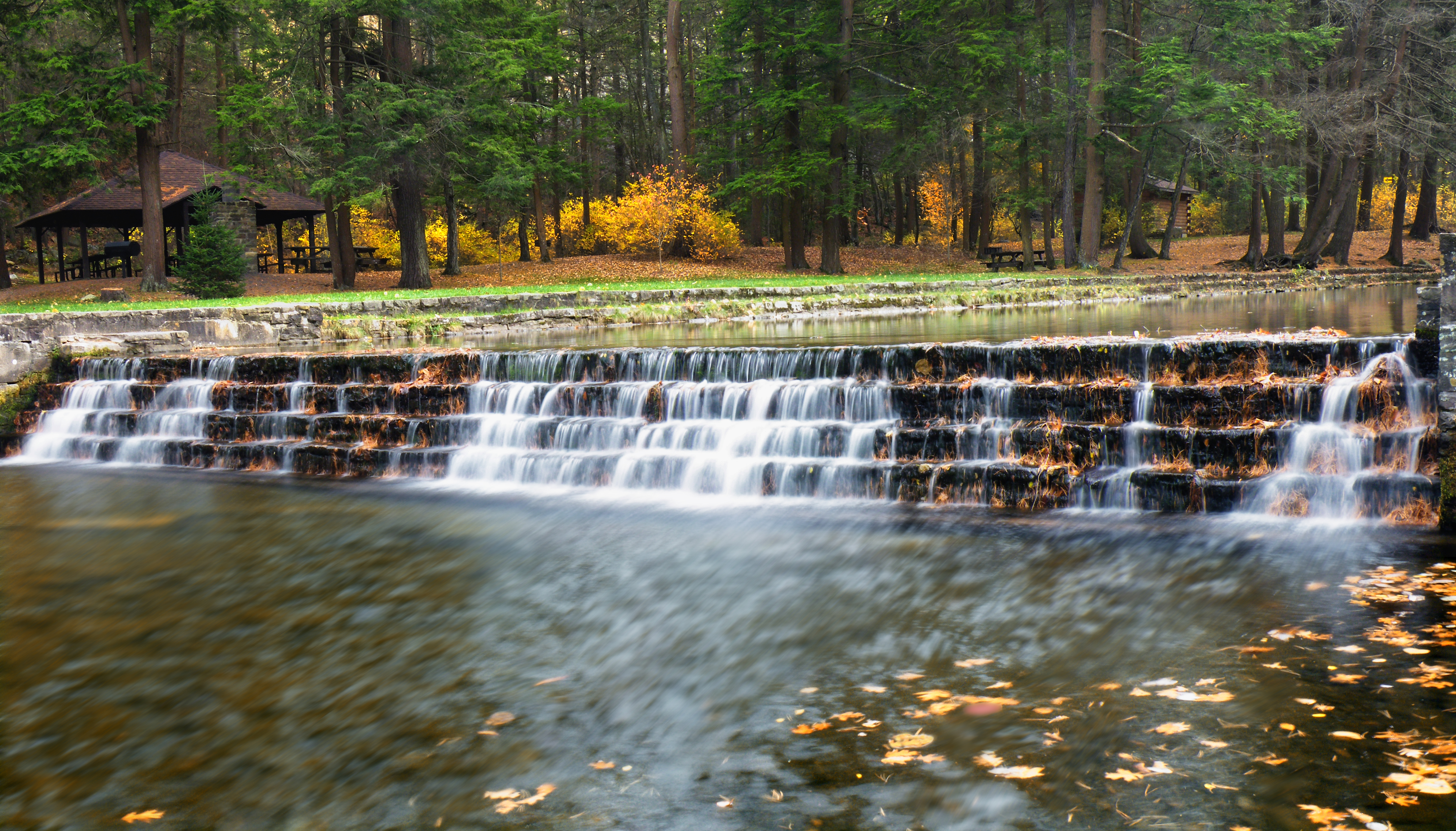
- The dam on Rauchtown Run built by the CCC

- Location within Pennsylvania Location within the United States
- Interactive map of Ravensburg State Park
- Location: Crawford Township, Clinton County, Pennsylvania, United States
- Coordinates: 41°06′30″N 77°14′37″W
- Area: 78 acres (32 ha)
- Elevation: 1,030 feet (310 m)
- Established: 1933
- Administrator: Pennsylvania Department of Conservation and Natural Resources
- Website: Official website
- Pennsylvania State Parks

Ravensburg State Park is a Pennsylvania state park in Crawford Township in Clinton County, Pennsylvania in the United States. It is in a gorge carved by Rauchtown Run through the side of Nippenose Mountain. Ravensburg State Park is 78 acres (32 ha) of wooded land that is almost entirely surrounded by Tiadaghton State Forest. This state park is on Pennsylvania Route 880, 8 miles (13 km) north of Carroll and 8 miles (13 km) south-east of Jersey Shore. The nearest city is Williamsport.

== History ==
Ravensburg State Park gets its name from the ravens that were known for roosting on the rock ledges at the southern end of the park (near the south entrance). Ravens can be seen in the vicinity of the park to this day, making the name logical though there is no community nearby that goes by the name Ravensburg. The park has no connection to the German city Ravensburg The nearest community to Ravensburg State Park is the unincorporated village of Rauchtown.

The forest surrounding and within Ravensburg State Park has not changed much in the past 100 years. It is also unlikely that much timber has even been harvested in this area due to the extremely rocky surroundings and the narrow gorge in which Ravensburg State Park lies.

Ravensburg State Park was constructed during the Great Depression in the 1930s by the Civilian Conservation Corps founded by President Franklin D. Roosevelt. Ravensburg State Park is just one of many examples of the work of the Civilian Conservation Corps (CCC) throughout North Central Pennsylvania. The CCC built a small dam on Rauchtown Run that is still being used as a swimming hole by the visitors to Ravensburg State Park. The CCC also built pavilions, latrines, bridges, trails, waterlines and fountains at the park.

The Emergency Conservation Work architecture in the 1933–1942 period has earned the park a listing on the National Register of Historic Places, along with other Pennsylvania state parks developed in this time period.

== Geology ==
Over the years Rauchtown Run has made its way through the mountains on its way to the West Branch Susquehanna River near Jersey Shore, via Antes Creek. The years of water flow have created the gorge in which the park is located. Tall erosional spires of sandstone have created a formation known as Castle Rocks. The rocks can be seen from the Mid State Trail and are said to resemble the towers of an ancient castle. The frost action, brought on by the cold winters of Pennsylvania, has led to the creation of this rock formation.

== Recreation ==
=== Camping ===
Bring your tents to Ravensburg because that is the only type of camping available. The campground is downstream from the dam. Each campground has a fire ring as well as a picnic table.

=== Picnics ===
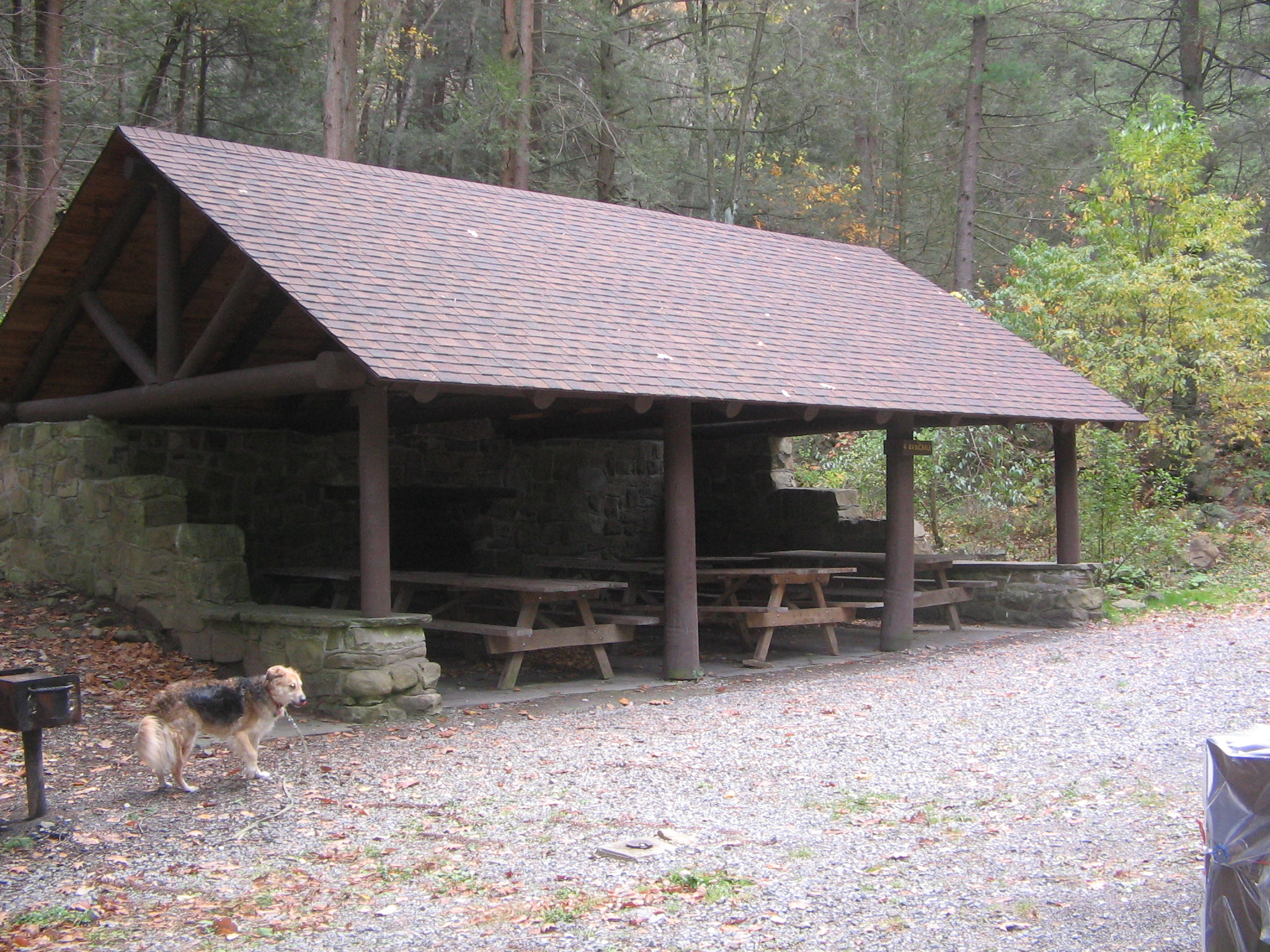
Picnic shelter built by the Civilian Conservation Corps in Ravensburg State Park

Ravensburg is popular for picnicking by families and church groups. There are three picnic areas on the grounds of Ravensburg State Park. Each area has picnic tables and pavilions and charcoal grills. There is a centrally located playfield with a playground and several horseshoe pits.

=== Hunting ===
Because Ravensburg State Park is just 78 acres (32 ha) in size, hunting is prohibited with the confines of the park. However, there are 215,000 acres (87,000 ha) of hunting area available in the surrounding Tiadaghton State Forest.

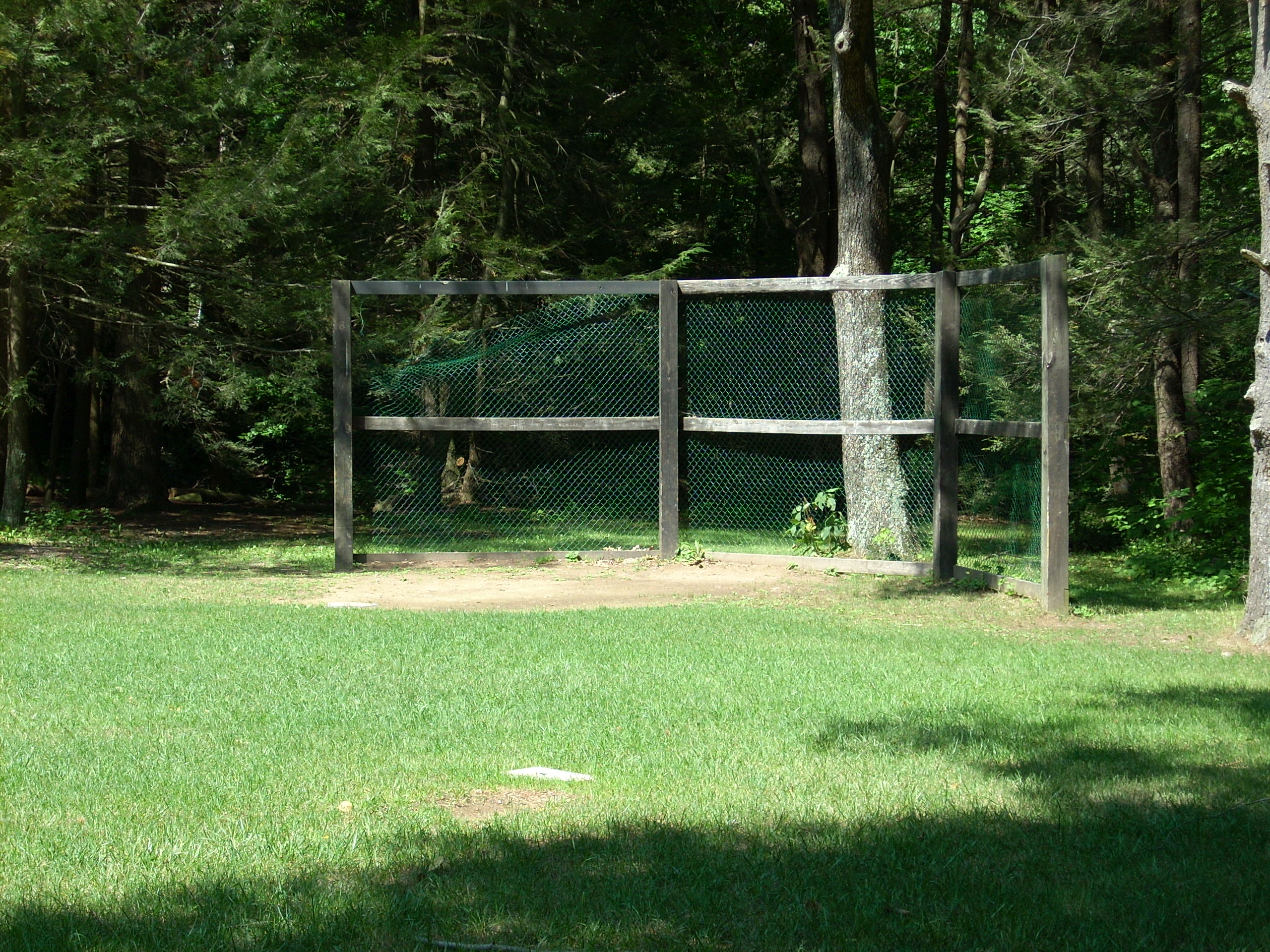
The ballfield at Ravensburg State Park

=== Hiking ===
There is one mile (1.6 km) of hiking trail available. Raven Trail, on the banks of Rauchtown Run, provides easy access to the creek for fishing. There are several side trails that lead to scenic rocky outcrops or to other hiking trails on state forest land. The 306-mile (492 km) Mid State backpacking trail is accessible from Ravensburg State Park.

=== Fishing ===
Avid fishermen will find native brook trout and brown trout living in Rauchtown Run. This provides for cold water fishing in Rauchtown Run as well as its tributaries.
