= List of mayors of Williamsport, Pennsylvania =

This is a list of mayors of the City of Williamsport, in the U.S. state of Pennsylvania, from 1866–present.

- Maj. James M. Wood, 1866–1867
- Dr. William F. Logan, 1867–1869
- Peter Herdic, 1869–1870
- Maj. James H. Perkins, 1870–1872
- Seth W. Starkweather, 1872–1874
- Martin Powell, 1874–1876
- Seth W. Starkweather, 1876–1878
- Henry C. Parsons, 1882–1884
- Samuel M. Crans, 1884–1886
- William N. Jones, 1886–1888
- James S. Foresman, 1888–1890
- Frederick H. Keller, 1890–1893
- William G. Elliot, 1893–1896
- James Mansel, 1896–1899
- Samuel N. Williams, 1899–1902
- John F. Laedlein, 1902–1905
- Seth T. Foresman, 1905–1908
- Charles D. Wolfe, 1908–1911
- Samuel Stabler, 1911–1916
- Jonas Fischer, 1916–1917
- Archibald M. Hoagland, 1917–1924
- Hugh Gilmore, 1924–1928
- Herbert T. Ames, 1928–1932
- George K. Harris, 1932–1936
- Charles D. Wolfe, 1936–1940
- Leo C. Williamson, 1940–1952
- Clifford L. Harman, 1952–1956
- Thomas H. Levering, 1956–1964
- Raymond M. Knaur, 1964–1968
- Richard J. Carey, 1968–1972
- John R. Coder, 1972–1976
- Daniel P. Kirby, 1976–1980
- Stephen J. Lucasi, 1980–1988
- Jessica L. Bloom, 1988–1992 – First female mayor. Bloom was a former member of City Council. Was the chairwoman of Lycoming County Democratic Party until her death in 2023.
- Phillip E. Preziosi, 1992–1996 – Former member of City Police Department. Second officer to win mayor's office.
- Steven W. Cappelli, 1996–2000 – Resigned to become State Representative from 83rd legislative district, 2001–2009
- Michael R. Rafferty, 2000–2004 – Served nine years on City Council, six years as council president.
- Mary B. Wolf, 2004–2008 – Second female mayor. Wolf was a former member of City Council and a former college professor.
- Gabriel J. Campana, 2008–2020
- Derek Slaughter, 2020 – first African-American male Democratic mayor. Slaughter was a former school teacher.

== See also ==
- History of Williamsport, Pennsylvania
