= Crawford Township, Pennsylvania =

Township in Pennsylvania, US

Coordinates: 41°06′00″N 77°15′59″W

- Township
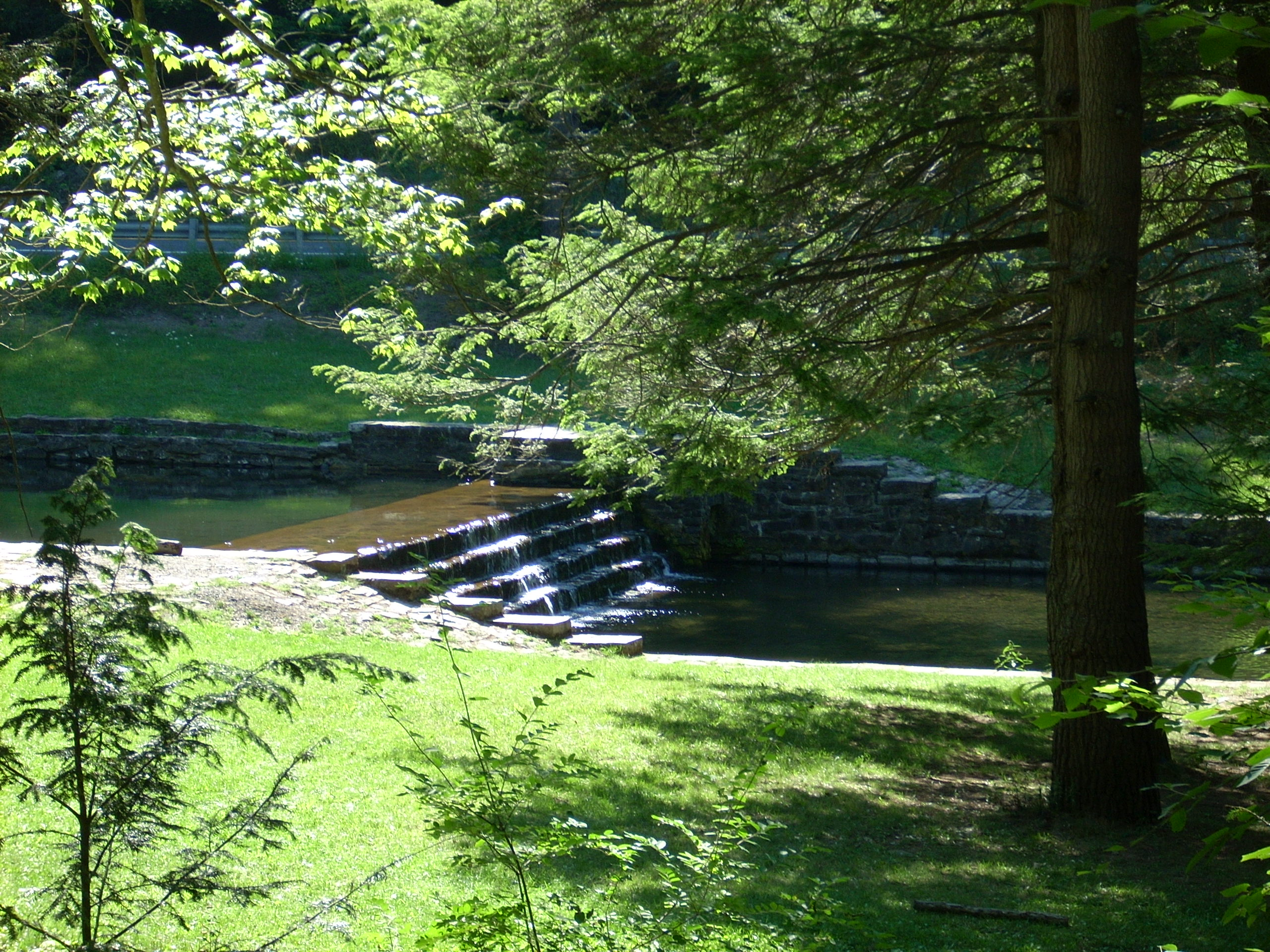
- Rauchtown Run at Ravensburg State Park in Crawford Township

- Location in Clinton County and the state of Pennsylvania.
- Country: United States
- State: Pennsylvania
- County: Clinton
- Settled: 1776
- Incorporated: 1841

Area
  - Total: 22.14 sq mi (57.33 km^{2})
  - Land: 22.12 sq mi (57.29 km^{2})
  - Water: 0.015 sq mi (0.04 km^{2})

Population (2020)
  - Total: 968 ▲
  - Estimate (2021): 970
  - Density: 42.6/sq mi (16.43/km^{2})
- Time zone: UTC-5 (EST)
  - Summer (DST): UTC-4 (EDT)
- FIPS code: 42-035-16976

Crawford Township is a township in Clinton County, Pennsylvania, United States. The population was 968 at the 2020 census.

== History ==
Ravensburg State Park was listed on the National Register of Historic Places in 1987.

== Geography ==
According to the United States Census Bureau, the township has a total area of 22.14 square miles (57.33 km^{2}), of which 22.12 square miles (57.29 km^{2}) is land and 0.02 square miles (0.04 km^{2}), or 0.07%, is water. The township is located in southeastern Clinton County and is bordered to the northeast by Lycoming County. The unincorporated community of Rauchtown occupies the northeastern part of the township.

== Demographics ==
Historical population
| Census | Pop. | Note | %± |
|---|---|---|---|
| 1980 | 682 | | — |
| 1990 | 665 | | −2.5% |
| 2000 | 848 | | 27.5% |
| 2010 | 939 | | 10.7% |
| 2020 | 968 | | 3.1% |
| 2021 (est.) | 970 | | 0.2% |

As of the census of 2000, there were 848 people, 308 households, and 244 families residing in the township. The population density was 38.4 inhabitants per square mile (14.8/km^{2}). There were 365 housing units at an average density of 16.5/sq mi (6.4/km^{2}). The racial makeup of the township was 99.17% White, 0.24% African American, 0.12% Native American, 0.24% Asian, and 0.24% from two or more races. Hispanic or Latino of any race were 0.24% of the population.

There were 308 households, out of which 33.8% had children under the age of 18 living with them, 68.8% were married couples living together, 4.9% had a female householder with no husband present, and 20.5% were non-families. 16.2% of all households were made up of individuals, and 8.8% had someone living alone who was 65 years of age or older. The average household size was 2.75 and the average family size was 3.07.

In the township the population was spread out, with 28.9% under the age of 18, 4.2% from 18 to 24, 27.6% from 25 to 44, 26.5% from 45 to 64, and 12.7% who were 65 years of age or older. The median age was 38 years. For every 100 females, there were 97.2 males. For every 100 females age 18 and over, there were 101.7 males.

The median income for a household in the township was $38,824, and the median income for a family was $43,750. Males had a median income of $31,477 versus $20,809 for females. The per capita income for the township was $16,360. About 4.4% of families and 10.0% of the population were below the poverty line, including 19.3% of those under age 18 and 6.4% of those age 65 or over.
