= Rauchtown, Pennsylvania =

Unincorporated community in Pennsylvania, US

- Census-designated place
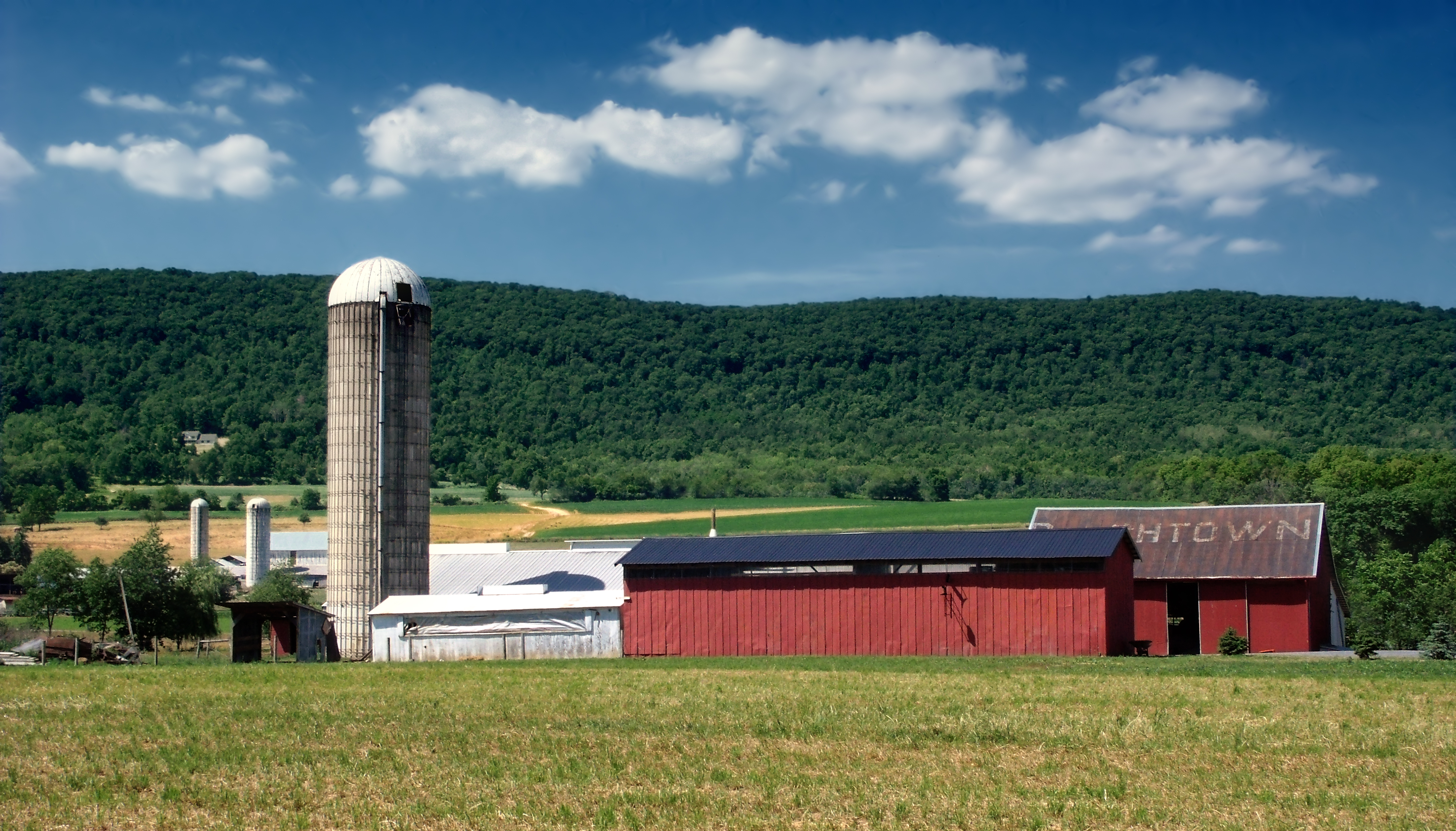
- Farm in Rauchtown

- Location in Clinton County and the state of Pennsylvania.
- Coordinates: 41°7′22″N 77°14′9″W
- Country: United States
- State: Pennsylvania
- Counties: Clinton, Lycoming
- Townships: Crawford, Limestone

Area
  - Total: 1.78 sq mi (4.62 km^{2})
  - Land: 1.78 sq mi (4.62 km^{2})
  - Water: 0.0039 sq mi (0.01 km^{2})
- Elevation: 889 ft (271 m)

Population (2020)
  - Total: 722
  - Density: 405.0/sq mi (156.39/km^{2})
- Time zone: UTC-5 (Eastern (EST))
  - Summer (DST): UTC-4 (EDT)
- ZIP code: 17740
- FIPS code: 42-63496
- GNIS feature ID: 1184700

Rauchtown is a census-designated place in Crawford Township, Clinton County, and a small portion in Limestone Township, Lycoming County, in the U.S. state of Pennsylvania. As of the 2010 census the population was 726.

Rauchtown is on Pennsylvania Route 880 on the border between southeastern Clinton County and southwestern Lycoming County, at the western end of the Nippenose Valley, between Bald Eagle Mountain to the north and Nippenose Mountain to the south. Ravensburg State Park is on the southern edge of Rauchtown, in the narrow valley of Rauchtown Creek coming out of Nippenose Mountain. PA 880 leads north (via PA 44) 7 miles (11 km) to the borough of Jersey Shore and south 6 miles (10 km) to the unincorporated community of Carroll, 1 mile (1.6 km) west of Exit 192 on Interstate 80.

== Demographics ==
Historical population
Census	Pop.	Note	%±
2020	722		—
U.S. Decennial Census
