= Mother Earth News =

Bi-monthly American magazine

- Frequency: Bimonthly
- Total circulation (2011): 500,520
- Founder: John Shuttleworth and Jane Shuttleworth
- Founded: 1970; 55 years ago
- Company: Ogden Publications
- Country: United States
- Based in: Topeka, Kansas
- Language: English
- Website: www.motherearthnews.com
- ISSN: 0027-1535

Mother Earth News is a bi-monthly American magazine that has a circulation of 500,520 as of 2011. It is published in Topeka, Kansas.

Since its founding, Mother Earth News has promoted renewable energy, recycling, family farms, good agricultural practices, better eating habits, medical self-care, more meaningful education and affordable housing. The magazine approaches environmental problems from a down-to-earth, practical, simple living, how-to standpoint.

== History ==
Founders John and Jane Shuttleworth started the magazine on a "shoestring" budget of $1500, published from home in 1970. The first issue was published in January of that year.

(John Shuttleworth died on March 29, 2009, at his home in Evergreen, Colorado, at the age of 71.)

The magazine was originally published in Madison, Ohio, and moved to Hendersonville, North Carolina, later. The headquarters is in Topeka, Kansas. It had a scrappy, no-frills style and appearance throughout the 1970s. Mother Earth News embraced the revived interest in the back-to-the-land movement at the beginning of the 1970s, and combined this with an interest in the ecology movement and self-sufficiency. Unlike many other magazines with ecological coverage, Mother Earth News concentrated on do-it-yourself and how-to articles, aimed at the growing number of people moving to the country. As a result, the magazine thrived throughout the 1970s. There were articles on home building, farming, gardening, and entrepreneurism, all with a DIY approach. The subject matter of the articles ranged widely into such subjects as geodesic domes, hunting, food storage, and even a regular column on amateur radio. Alternative energy was a frequent topic covered in the magazine, with articles on how to switch to solar power and wind power, and how to make a still and run your car on ethanol.

A series of "Plowboy Interviews" (a jokey nod to "Playboy Interviews") was also a regular feature, which included interviews of environmental leaders and others. With its left-of-center perspective, The Mother Earth News attracted a wide readership, not only of back to the landers but also others ranging from hippies, to survivalists, to suburban dwellers who dreamed of someday moving to the country, to long-time rural dwellers who found the DIY articles useful.

In the March–April 1975 issue of the magazine, Issue No. 32, John Shuttleworth said in the second installment of the Plowboy Interview:

For at least 20 years now, I've been getting an increasingly uncomfortable suspicion that all the major nations of the world — capitalist and communist — suffer from the narrow delusion that only people, and people alone, have any rights on this planet. Further, that human wants, needs, and desires — seemingly the more capricious the better — should be instantly gratified. And further still, that this can always be done in a strictly economic frame of reference.

"In short, I think that we live in an unbelievably marvelous Garden of Eden. Surrounded by miraculous life forms almost without number. Kept alive by a mysteriously interwoven, self-replenishing support system that, with all our scientific 'breakthroughs,' we still do not understand.

"And yet, as favored as we are by all this real wealth, we somehow perversely prefer to spend almost all waking hours interpreting the sum total of this reality in terms of the narrow and distorted, strictly human-centered concept of money."

In 1979 editor Bruce Woods and two other employees bought the magazine from the Shuttleworths. The Eco-Village, a 600-acre (240 ha) research center, was in full swing with vast experimental gardens, houses, and energy projects. Each summer 20,000 people took Mother Earth News seminars on everything from beekeeping to cordwood construction. A radio show shared the magazine's philosophies on hundreds of stations nationwide and alternative fuel vehicles carrying the Mother Earth News logo criss-crossed the country.

The magazine flagged somewhat with the declining popularity of the back to the land movement in the early 1980s. Eventually, it was sold to the New American Company in 1986, who redesigned it with a much slicker image and repositioned it as "The Original Country Magazine." A number of employees of Mother Earth News left the magazine at this time to start BackHome Magazine. New American stopped publishing its magazines, and sold them to Sussex Publishers in 1991. The magazine survived, and grew through the late 1990s and the first half-decade of the 21st century. Notable gardener Ira Wallace was the mid-Atlantic correspondent during the 1990s. Sussex Publishers in New York City owned the magazine until 2001, when it was acquired by its current owners, Ogden Publications.

In 2010, the magazine celebrated its 40th anniversary. The February–March issue included articles from the magazine's previous 40 years.

In 2020, the magazine celebrated its 50th anniversary, despite the COVID-19 pandemic. Each magazine issue that year contained content about the 50-year history of the title. Controversy hit the magazine in August, when they received public criticism from authors such as Chris Newman, for their lack of diversity in authors and representation. Ogden initially responded stumblingly, but has since embraced numerous initiatives to diversify its content, audience, and staff.

== See also ==
- Grit
- Utne Reader
- Harrowsmith
