= Grit (newspaper) =

American Magazine, now based in Kansas

- Lead editor: Karmin Garrison
- Editor at Large: Hank Will
- Technical editor: Rebecca Martin
- Categories: Rural lifestyle
- Frequency: Bi-monthly
- Circulation: 150,000
- Publisher: Bill Uhler
- Founder: Dietrick Lamade
- Founded: 1882
- First issue: December 1882
- Company: Ogden Publications, Inc.
- Country: US
- Based in: Topeka, Kansas
- Language: English
- Website: grit.com
- ISSN: 0017-4289
- OCLC: 190847592

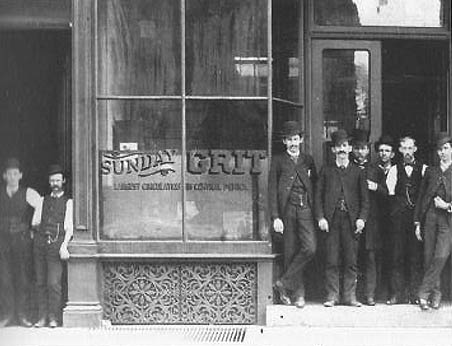
The Grit office as it looked in the 1890s: Publisher Dietrick Lamade is fifth from right, with the mustache.

Grit is a magazine, formerly a weekly newspaper, popular in the rural U.S. during much of the 20th century. It carried the subtitle "America's Greatest Family Newspaper". In the early 1930s, it targeted small town and rural families with 14 pages plus a fiction supplement. By 1932, it had a circulation of 425,000 in 48 states, and 83% of its circulation was in towns of fewer than 10,000 inhabitants.

== History ==
The publication was founded in 1882 as the Saturday edition of the Williamsport, Pennsylvania, Daily Sun and Banner. In 1885, the name was purchased for $1,000 by 25-year-old German immigrant Dietrick Lamade (pronounced Lam'-a-dee), who established a circulation of 4,000 during the first year.

Lamade was born February 6, 1859, in Gölshausen, Baden-Württemberg, Southern Germany, one of nine children of Johannes Dietrick and Caroline Stuepfle Lamade. The family moved to Williamsport in 1867, where Johannes died of typhoid fever on January 4, 1869. To support the family, Dietrick, his sister, and his older brothers quit school. At age ten, Dietrick began working as an errand boy, earning a weekly salary of $3 in the office of a local German-language weekly, Beobachter (literally Observer), when he was 13 years old.

At 18, Lamade began printing theater programs and a four-page ad brochure, the Merchants' Free Press. In the summer of 1880, he did Camp News for the Pennsylvania National Guard, and he married the following year. In 1882, Lamade became the ad compositor and assistant composing room foreman for the Daily Sun and Banner, and that same year, Grit began as the paper's Saturday edition, typeset by Lamade. He left the Daily Sun in 1884 to launch the weekly Times as a daily, but finances and the health of the owner led the Times to cease publication. With two children and no job, 25-year-old Lamade became a publisher. Teaming with two partners, he bought the Times equipment plus the Grit name and goodwill. During his first year, he increased Grit's circulation to 4,000. He operated from a third-floor single room, moving to a storefront location in 1886, establishing a weekly circulation of 20,000 by 1887.

With rapid expansion, a wagon of Remington typewriters was delivered to the Grit offices in 1892. In 1894, one member of the art department was the 16-year-old C. W. Kahles, later famed as the creator of the long-run comic strip Hairbreadth Harry.

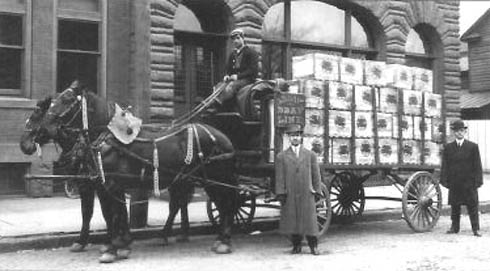
Remington typewriters arrive at Grit in 1892.

Grit displayed news and features aimed at rural America, and climbed to a weekly circulation of 100,000 by 1900, following an editorial policy outlined by Lamade during a banquet for Grit's employees:

Always keep Grit from being pessimistic. Avoid printing those things which distort the minds of readers or make them feel at odds with the world. Avoid showing the wrong side of things, or making people feel discontented. Do nothing that will encourage fear, worry, or temptation... Wherever possible, suggest peace and good will toward men. Give our readers courage and strength for their daily tasks. Put happy thoughts, cheer, and contentment into their hearts.

While introducing such innovations as national newsboy delivery and direct mail, Lamade expanded his content to combine news, human interest articles, comic strips (sometimes filling ten pages), puzzles and serials in fiction supplements ("Grit Story Section"). Circulation reached 300,000 in 1916.

== Little League and newsboy sales ==
Grit was a familiar newspaper in small towns across the U.S. for over a century. By the time of its 50th anniversary in 1932, 400,000 people bought the newspaper each week, increasing to 500,000 by 1934. Lamade retired in 1936, and died October 10, 1938. His son, George R. Lamade, became the publisher and editor, with grandson Howard Lamade Jr. serving as Grit's production manager. George R. Lamade died by suicide in August 1965.

Another son, Howard J. Lamade, was vice president, and also served as a top executive with Little League Baseball, helping to build it into a national institution. The main stadium used for the Little League World Series was built on land donated by the Lamade family, and it is named Howard J. Lamade Stadium in his memory.

Grit went to a tabloid format in 1944.

During the first three-quarters of the 20th century, Grit was sold across the country by children and teenagers, many recruited by ads in comic books from the 1940s to the 1970s. Approximately 30,000 children collected dimes from more than 700,000 American small town homes during the 1950s when the publication still carried the subtitle, "America's Greatest Family Newspaper." A comical ad in Richie Rich comic books aimed to recruit more young salesmen, suggesting that Richie's father, Richard Rich, got his start as a businessman selling Grit.

== Content ==
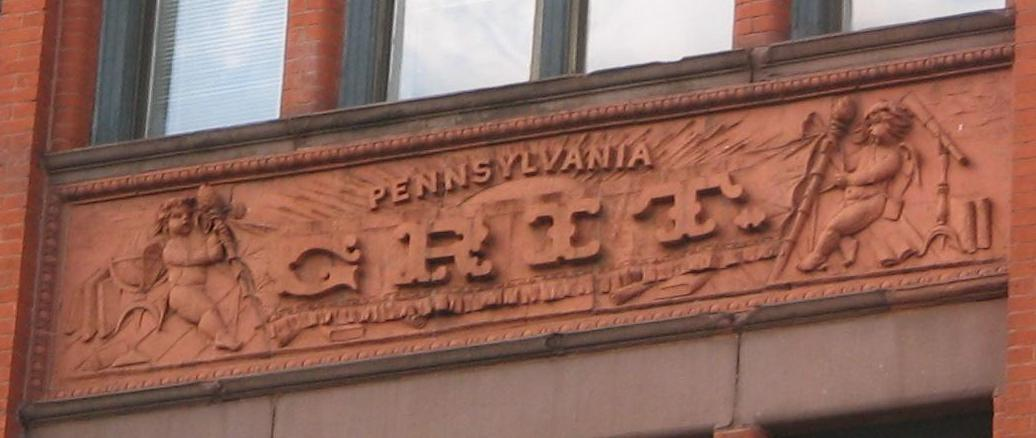
Logo on Grit's former headquarters in Williamsport

By the 1940s, the paper was separated into five different sections "for ease of handling and reading." For instance, the 44-page issue for Sunday, January 1, 1950, was divided as follows:

- News Section (12 pages)
- Women's Section (8 pages)
- Family Section (4 pages)
- Comic Section (4 pages)
- Story Section (16 pages)

The News Section, displaying a dramatic page-one headline, "Atomic Energy Provides Man Tool of Death or Good Life," followed with a variety of human-interest stories, a coverage of "1949 in Review," a "Stranger Than Fiction" column and a page of international news. More than a few photos focused on unusual highway accidents.

The Women's Section included fashion features and recipes, along with stories on house plants, new gadgets and how to hold a tea party. The Family Section featured jokes, puzzles and the "Odd, Strange and Curious" page with stories on such subjects as a two-headed turtle and the world's largest collection of cigarette lighters. The Story Section opened with the first installment of the serialized "Ring Out the Old" by Mary Hastings Bradley and included "Modern Parables", a series by Fulton Oursler, author of The Greatest Story Ever Told.

== Comic strips ==
A Grit comics page (September 8, 1946)

The Comic Section for January 1, 1950, carried the following Sunday comic strips in black-and-white: Chic Young's Blondie, Young's Colonel Potterby and the Duchess, Dixie Dugan by J. P. McEvoy and John H. Striebel, Walt Disney's Donald Duck, Flash Gordon by Mac Raboy and Don G. Moore, Carl Anderson's Henry, Ham Fisher's Joe Palooka, Jungle Jim by Paul Norris and Moore, Fran Striker's The Lone Ranger, Mandrake the Magician by Lee Falk and Phil Davis, J. R. Williams' Out Our Way, Hal Foster's Prince Valiant and Ed Reed's three-panel The Three Bares, extracted from Reed's Off the Record gag panel feature. To squeeze three or four strips on a page, some strips appear to have panels slightly cropped and other strips were stacked vertically, with The Three Bares inserted at the bottom as a filler.

A few years later, Grit reduced the number of pages from 44 to 40, and went from five sections to four sections by combining the comic strips and illustrated stories into a single section. In this format, the strips were scattered about with a single strip used as a design element to relieve the monotony of many grey columns of story text.

Charlie Walker, writing in the February 16, 2000, edition of The News (Kingstree, South Carolina), described a 1956 issue:

A few weeks ago, Leo Barrineau, who lives at Barrineau's Crossroads, gave me a call. His son Steve, while remodeling the church at Broad Swamp, had discovered a 1956 Grit newspaper in the walls of the church. When it comes to old newspapers, old pictures and old phonograph records, I don't need Viagra to turn me on. This Grit was published January 1, 1956. It contained 40 pages and cost a dime. So hop aboard the Twilight Zone Express. Put your memory in reverse, and together, we will remember the way it was. The back page of this 44-year-old newspaper recalled the dramatic events of 1955. The polio vaccine was developed by Dr. Jonas Salk. President Eisenhower suffered a heart attack. The first atomic-powered submarine, the Nautilus, was launched. In 1955, the Brooklyn Dodgers beat the New York Yankees in the World Series. Oklahoma was the No. 1 college football team in the land.

Bennett Cerf wrote a column for Grit. The funnies included Blondie, Joe Palooka, The Lone Ranger, Donald Duck and Henry. There was a crossword puzzle and a serial, a murder mystery called, Tell Her It's Murder. This copy of Grit contained the 29th and final chapter. The first Grit of 1956 also contained predictions for the upcoming year. The unicycle would be the number one sport in the summer of 1956. And the TV program that would replace The $64,000 Question would be one called Can You Trust Your Wife? And in 1956 just like today, doctors still couldn't cure the common cold. Grit carried a full-page ad offering Valentine cards for seven cents each. Grit also carried an ad for Sinclair Gasoline. (Willie Munn operated a Sinclair station at the corner of Main and Jackson streets in Kingstree.) Grit was recruiting carriers to sell their paper. You could make 4¢ for each paper you sold.

Grit was a pioneer in the introduction of offset printing. It was one of the first newspapers in the US to run color photographs, with the first full-color picture (of the American flag) appearing on the front page in June 1963. At its peak in 1969, Grit had a weekly circulation of 1.5 million copies.

The Lamade family owned Grit for nearly 100 years, but in 1981, ADVO-System, Inc. of Hartford, Connecticut purchased the paper. In 1983, Grit was purchased by Stauffer Communications, Inc. of Topeka, Kansas, which already owned Capper's Weekly, a national tabloid also marketed to rural areas and small towns, albeit mostly in the Great Plains and Midwestern states.

== From Williamsport to Topeka ==
In 1992, Grit left Williamsport after 111 years and moved its offices to Topeka. At that time, Roberta Peterson was editor-in-chief of Grit and also of Best Recipes, a bimonthly glossy magazine that grew to be a Top 10 paid circulation national food title. Peterson left the group for a Senior Editor position at Meredith Corporation (Better Homes and Gardens, Ladies Home Journal) in 1995, at the time of the magazine group's double sale—first to Morris Communications, and very shortly after in the same year, to Ogden Publications. At that time, publishing of Best Recipes was suspended.

For decades Grit had published a national edition, a Pennsylvania edition (for sale within the Keystone State, featuring mostly Pennsylvania-related stories) and a local edition. The local edition was the Sunday newspaper for Williamsport and Lycoming County, Pennsylvania, and was circulated in 13 other counties in north-central Pennsylvania as well; the National Edition served essentially as its magazine. This edition stopped publication in the early 1990s, whereupon the Williamsport Sun Gazette began producing a Sunday edition. Michael R. Rafferty, who later served as a city councilman and mayor of Williamsport (2000–2004), was the last native-born Williamsporter to serve as editor of the Grit national and city editions, leaving Grit in 1991. He served as editor of Webb Weekly, a Williamsport publication with an approach similar to Grit's from 2004 to 2013 when he retired from journalism after 30+ years.

In 1995, the Morris Communications Corporation purchased Stauffer Communications, giving Morris a total of 32 daily newspapers in 13 states when it added Stauffer's 20 daily papers, including the Stauffer flagship, the Topeka Capital-Journal. Morris president Paul S. Simon said he intended to sell Stauffer's broadcast division, including 11 stations and several radio networks, and Stauffer Magazine Group, which included Grit, Cappers (a rural tabloid with a 120-year history, formerly the Cappers Weekly referred to above) and Best Recipes magazine.

Later that year, Grit and Cappers were acquired by Ogden Publications. Grit, which had until this time been biweekly, was then edited by Kathryn Compton as a monthly with the subtitle "Stories of American Life & Tradition." Other Ogden Publications include American Life & Traditions, Farm Collector, Mother Earth News and Utne Reader.

Beginning with the September 2006 issue, Grit converted to an all-glossy, perfect bound magazine format and a bi-monthly schedule. The revamped editorial policy encompasses more of a contemporary rural emphasis on content, rather than the nostalgic themes of the previous decade. With a print run of 150,000 and Time Warner as the national newsstand distributor, Grit was displayed and sold at general newsstand outlets, bookstores and specialty farm feed and supply stores, including Tractor Supply Company.
