= Pennsylvania College of Technology =

Public college in Williamsport, Pennsylvania, U.S.

- Former names: Williamsport High School (1914–1941); Williamsport Technical Institute (1941–1965); Williamsport Area Community College (1965–1989)
- Type: Public technical college
- Established: 1989; 37 years ago
- Accreditation: MSCHE
- Affiliations: Pennsylvania State University
- Endowment: $36.7 million (2025) (Note: Includes the college, foundation, and community arts center.)
- President: Michael J. Reed
- Faculty: 267 full-time
- Students: 4,575 (Fall 2024)
- Undergraduates: 4,526
- Postgraduates: 49
- Location: Williamsport, Pennsylvania, U.S. 41.235°N 77.021°W
- Campus: Small city
- Colors: Blue and gray
- Nickname: Wildcats
- Sporting affiliations: NCAA Division III – United East Conference
- Website: pct.edu

The Pennsylvania College of Technology (PCT, Penn College, or Penn Tech (Note: The use of "Penn Tech" is discouraged by the institution.)) is a public technical college in Williamsport, Pennsylvania, United States. Although accredited separately from the Pennsylvania State University, it is a "special-mission affiliate of Penn State".

Penn College is an applied technology college, accredited by the Middle States Commission on Higher Education, that offers certificate, associate's, bachelor's, and master's degree programs in more than 100 fields of study. The college is organized into three schools: School of Engineering Technologies; School of Business, Arts & Sciences; and School of Nursing & Health Sciences.

The college's 15 varsity sports teams are the Penn College Wildcats, which compete in the United East Conference of NCAA Division III.

== History ==
The predecessor to Penn College, Williamsport High School, opened in Williamsport in 1914. In 1918, an adult school was established at the high school. The Williamsport Technical Institute was founded in 1941 as a merger of the high school and adult programs.

An aviation shop was opened at the Montoursville regional airport in 1942. Following World War II, students attended the technical institute on the G.I. Bill. In 1965, the institute became Williamsport Area Community College, the second community college established after Pennsylvania's 1963 Community College Act. It was first accredited by the Middle States Commission on Higher Education in 1970.

Governor Bob Casey Sr. signed legislation in 1989 turning the community college into a wholly-owned subsidiary of Pennsylvania State University, a state-related land-grant university based in University Park, Pennsylvania. Today, Penn College is part of the Penn State system and retains its affiliation to the university.

== Academics ==
Penn College offers more than 100 certificate, associate's, bachelor's, and master's programs, both on-campus and online, including a Master of Science degree in nursing and Master of Science in physician assistant studies. The college is accredited by the Middle States Commission on Higher Education. As an affiliate of Penn State, the Pennsylvania College of Technology is part of the Commonwealth System of Higher Education.

The college's Workforce Development division offers professional development training, apprenticeships, and a training program in polymer research and development. From July 2024 to June 2025, Workforce Development served 5,453 workers from over 500 employers to address workforce needs. Penn College also has a center dedicated to automotive technology education.

Academics at the college are organized into three schools:

- School of Business, Arts & Sciences
- School of Engineering Technologies
- School of Nursing & Health Sciences

=== Rankings ===
In 2026, U.S. News & World Report ranked the Pennsylvania College of Technology 4th overall in Regional Colleges North and number one in the region for Best Colleges for Veterans and Most Innovative Schools.

== Campuses ==
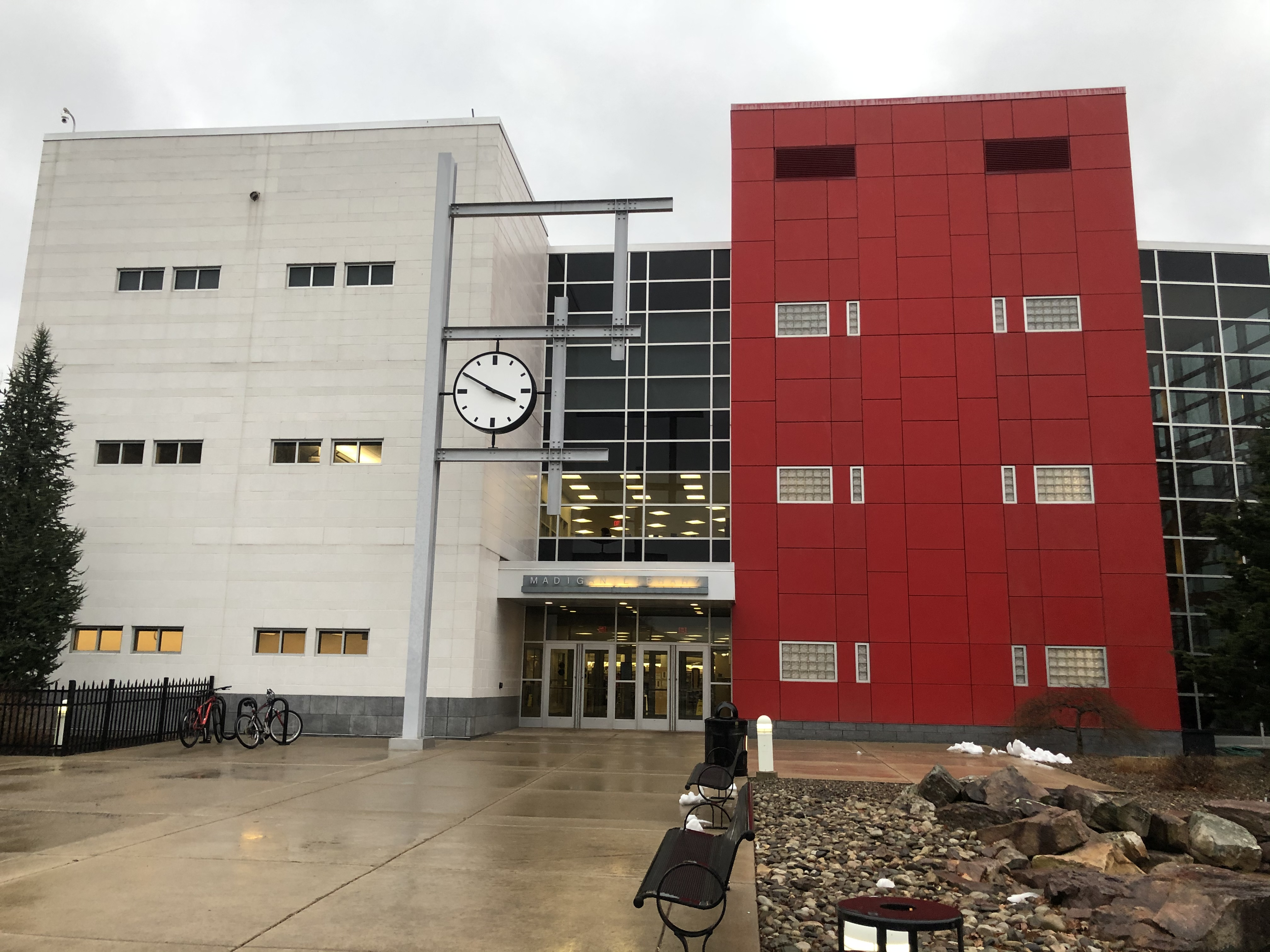
Madigan Library

In addition to its main campus in Williamsport, Penn College operates several satellite locations around North Central Pennsylvania. On its main campus, Penn College has a casual fine-dining restaurant named Le Jeune Chef. The restaurant serves as a training facility for students in the business and hospitality department.

Lumley Aviation Center, opened in 1993, is located at the Williamsport Regional Airport in Montoursville. It provides programs in aircraft maintenance and repair. The Schneebeli Earth Science Center, located in Montgomery, 12 miles from Williamsport, offers programs such as forestry, landscape and plant production, and heavy machinery operation. Penn College also operates a space in Wellsboro to prepare healthcare career candidates.

== Student life ==
=== Demographics ===
The college's student body is 82% full-time as of Fall 2024. Pennsylvania residents make up 85% of students, with students from North Central Pennsylvania constituting approximately one third of the student body.

In Fall 2024, 84% of enrolled undergraduates were White, with 6% being Hispanic/Latino and 5% Black or African American.

=== Student organizations ===
Penn College recognizes two fraternities: Phi Mu Delta and Sigma Pi. Additionally, the Student Government Association liaises with the administration and funds the college's student organizations.

=== Housing ===
Penn College offers primarily apartment-style housing through three residence hall complexes: Rose Street Commons and The Village for first-years and Campus View for upperclassmen.

=== Safety ===
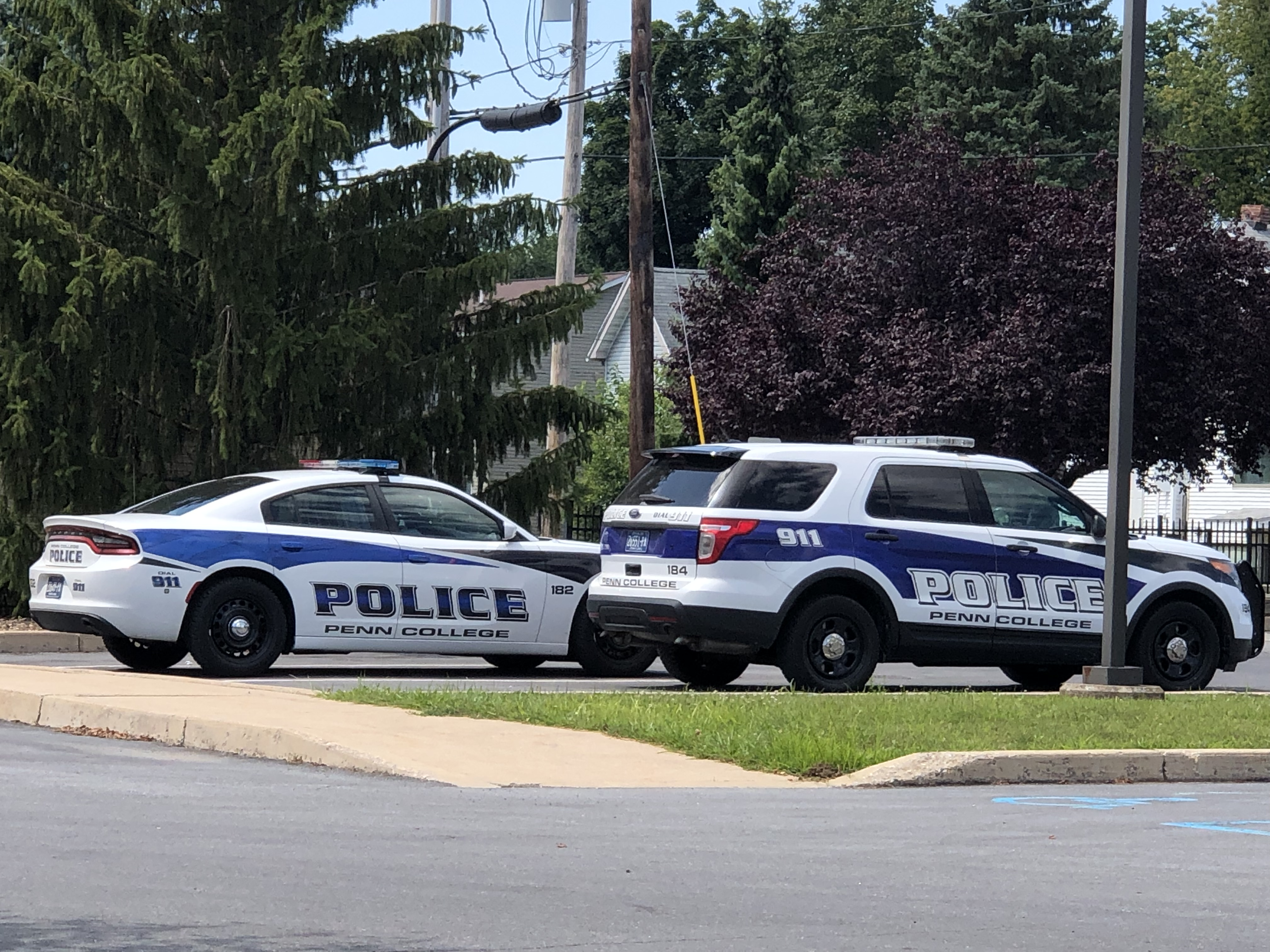
Penn College Police vehicles

Penn College Police is the second-largest police force in Lycoming County. In 1997, Penn College purchased an apartment complex for use by the police department. The college's annual safety report notes that most offences on campus are for liquor laws, theft, or vandalism.

=== Athletics ===
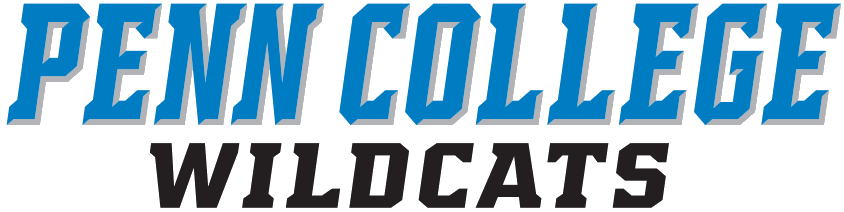
Athletics wordmark

Penn College athletic teams participate in the National Collegiate Athletic Association's Division III. The Wildcats sponsor men's and women's basketball, cross country, soccer, and tennis; men's baseball, golf, lacrosse, and wrestling; women's softball and volleyball; and co-ed archery. They are currently a member of the United East Conference, though men's wrestling competes in the Allegheny Mountain Collegiate Conference and archery competes in USA Archery.

Prior to joining the NCAA ranks for 2013–2014, Penn College was a member of the Penn State University Athletic Conference in the United States Collegiate Athletic Association.

== Notable people ==
=== Alumni ===
- Jake Corman, Pennsylvania State Senator
- Gary Haluska, Pennsylvania Representative
- Tom Marino, U.S. Representative
- Scott Wagner, Pennsylvania State Senator and gubernatorial nominee

=== Faculty ===
- Derek Slaughter, mathematician and Mayor of Williamsport
